= 1790s =

Decade

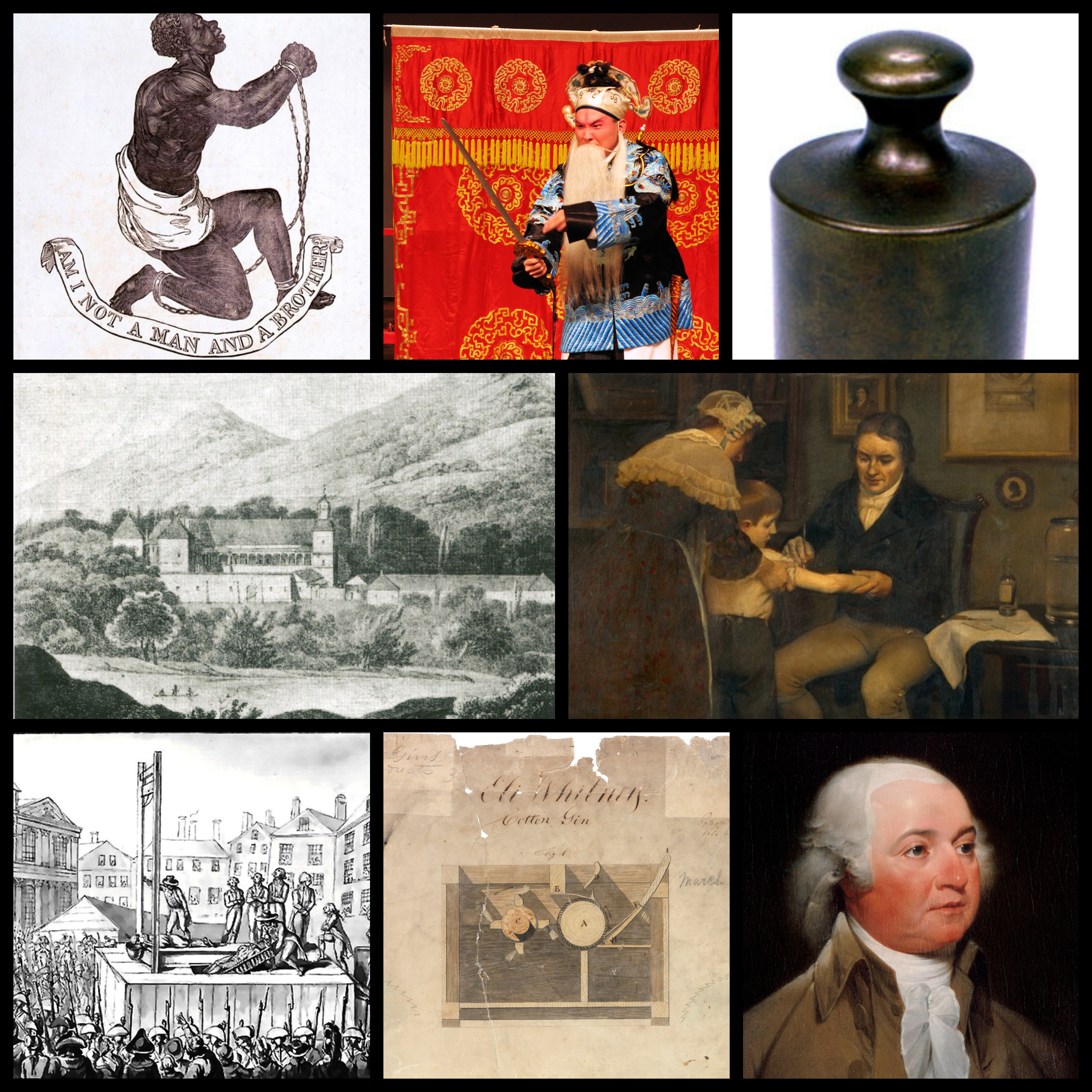
From top left, clockwise: Atlantic slave trade and abolitionism gain momentum over Europe and the Americas, as bans began to be enacted in countries such as Denmark-Norway (1803), the United Kingdom (1807), and Union States of the United States (1808) in the subsequent decade, following movements and upheavals of awareness at this period; Now-iconic Peking opera was conceived after the Four Great Anhui Troupes were brought into the dynasty capital to perform in Beijing, sometime in 1790; The metric system is formally adopted for the first time in France after receiving recommendation from its Commission of Weights and Measures. This set the metric system as a global default of measures and trail-blazed its universal acceptance as the standard of measures, outpacing the imperial system in the process; Smallpox vaccine was created in 1796 by British doctor Edward Jenner; a patent that would unknowingly lead to the eradication of smallpox, directly contributing to the world's first and only successful disease eradication campaign; The United States' very first contested presidential elections took place in 1796, who was eventually won over by John Adams; The cotton gin was first formally patented and came into industrial use in 1793, by American Eli Whitney. The modernized version of the engine paved way for much of the Industrial Revolution and enabled the textile industry to evolve and flourish more, due to its ability to separate cotton; French Revolutionary Wars broke out and culminated at this decade, where events such as the Reign of Terror (pictured) and the establishment of the French First Republic set off frenzied politics, birthing the idea of modern-day political spectrum in the process; Lithography was invented, revolutionising print methods, and increasing pragmatism over information processing. The decade also saw the beginning of the decline of Qing Dynasty.

The 1790s (pronounced "seventeen-nineties") was the decade that began on January 1, 1790, and ended on December 31, 1799. Considered as some of the Industrial Revolution's earlier days, the 1790s called for the start of an anti-imperialist world, as new democracies such as the French First Republic and the United States began flourishing at this era. Revolutions – both political and social – forever transformed global politics and art, as wars such as the French Revolutionary Wars and the American Revolutionary War moulded modern-day concepts of liberalism, partisanship, elections, and the political compass.

== Events ==
=== January–March ===
- January 8 – United States President George Washington gives the first State of the Union address, in New York City.
- January 11 – The 11 minor states of the Austrian Netherlands, which took part in the Brabant Revolution at the end of 1789, sign a Treaty of Union, creating the United States of Belgium.
- January 14 – U.S. Secretary of the Treasury Alexander Hamilton submits his proposed plan for payment of American debts, starting with $12,000,000 to pay the foreign debts of the confederation, followed by $40 million for domestic debts, and $21.5 million for the war debts of the states. The plan is narrowly approved 14-12 in the Senate, and 34-28 in the House.
- January 15 – Fletcher Christian & 8 mutineers aboard the Bounty land on Pitcairn.
- January 26 – Mozart's opera Così fan tutte premieres in Vienna.
- January 30
  - The first boat specialized as a rescue lifeboat is tested on the River Tyne in England.
  - Olowalu Massacre: American Captain Simon Metcalfe opens fire with cannon towards villagers in canoes, killing about one hundred Hawaiians, and wounding many others.
- February 1 – In New York City, the Supreme Court of the United States convenes for the first time.
- February 4 – King Louis XVI declares to the French National Assembly that he will maintain the constitutional laws.
- February 11 – Two Quaker delegates petition the United States Congress for the abolition of slavery.
- February 25 – North Carolina cedes its western territories (modern day Tennessee) to the federal government.
- March 1 – The first United States Census is authorized; it is held later in the year.
- March 4 – France is divided into 83 départements, which cut across the former provinces, in an attempt to dislodge regional loyalties based on noble ownership of land.
- March 6 – The New York legislature consents to the admission to the Union of a new state, Vermont, formed within the boundaries of New York, contingent upon the successful conclusion of negotiations concerning disputed real-estate claims, and the boundary between the two states.
- March 21 – Thomas Jefferson reports to President George Washington in New York, as the new United States Secretary of State.

=== April–June ===
- April 10 – The United States patent system is established.
- May 13 – Battle of Reval: Gustav III of Sweden sends the battlefleet to eliminate the Russian squadron wintering at Reval (Estonia), but is defeated; 8 Russians, 130 Swedes are killed, up to 520 captured, 1 ship is burnt, another captured.
- May 17–18 – Battle of Andros: An Ottoman–Algerian fleet destroys the fleet of the Greek privateer Lambros Katsonis.
- May 26 – Congress passes an act to govern the creation of states from the "Southwest Territory", from which Tennessee, Alabama, and Mississippi will be formed.
- May 29 – Rhode Island ratifies the United States Constitution, and becomes the last of the 13 original states to do so.
- June 9 – Royal assent is given to establishment of the port of Milford Haven in Wales.
- June 20 – Compromise of 1790: Thomas Jefferson, James Madison, and Alexander Hamilton come to an agreement: Madison agrees to not be "strenuous" in opposition for the assumption of state debts by the federal government; Hamilton agrees to support the capital site being above the Potomac.
- June 23 – The alleged London Monster is arrested in London; he later receives 40 years for 10 assaults.

=== July–September ===
- July – Louis XVI accepts a constitutional monarchy in France.
- July 9 – Russo-Swedish War – Second Battle of Svensksund: In a massive Baltic Sea battle of 300 ships, the Swedish Navy captures one third of the Russian galley fleet: 304 Swedes are killed, 3,500 Russians killed and 6,000 captured, 51 Russian galleys and other rowing craft are sunk and 22 are taken.
- July 10 — The U.S. House of Representatives votes 32–29 to approve creating the District of Columbia from portions of Maryland and Virginia for the eventual seat of government and national capital.
- July 12 – French Revolution: The Civil Constitution of the Clergy is passed. This completes the destruction of the monastic orders, legislating out of existence all regular and secular chapters for either sex, abbacies and priorships.
- July 14 – French Revolution: Citizens of Paris celebrate the unity of the French people and the national reconciliation, in the Fête de la Fédération.
- July 16 – U.S. President George Washington signs the Residence Act into law, establishing a site along the Potomac River as the District of Columbia and the future site of the capital of the United States. The move comes after the bill is narrowly approved on July 1 by the Senate, 14 to 12, and on July 9 by the House, 32 to 29. At the same time, plans are made to move the national capital from New York to Philadelphia until the Potomac River site can be completed.
- July 26 – Alexander Hamilton's Assumption Bill, giving effect to his First Report on the Public Credit, is passed in the United States Congress, allowing the federal government to assume the consolidated debts of the U.S. states.
- July 27 – The Convention of Reichenbach is signed between Prussia and Austria.
- July 31 – Inventor Samuel Hopkins becomes the first to be issued a U.S. patent (for an improved method of making potash).
- August 4 – A newly passed U.S. tariff act creates the system of cutters for revenue enforcement (later named the United States Revenue Cutter Service), the forerunner of the Coast Guard.
- August 14 – The Treaty of Värälä ends the Russo-Swedish War.
- September 25 – The Peking Opera is born, when the Four Great Anhui Troupes introduce Anhui opera to Beijing, in honor of the Qianlong Emperor's 80th birthday.
- September 30 – Leopold II, Holy Roman Emperor starts to rule.

=== October–December ===
- October 7–22 – The Harmar Campaign ends in a defeat of U.S. Army General Josiah Harmar and Colonel John Hardin by the Western Confederacy of Indians, led by Chief Little Turtle or Mihšihkinaahkwa of the Miami tribe and Blue Jacket or Weyapiersenwah of the Shawnee at Kekionga (now Fort Wayne, Indiana).
- October 7 – Commissioners appointed by the New York legislature announce the successful conclusion of negotiations between New York and Vermont, concerning disputed real-estate claims, and the consent of New York's legislature to the admission to the Union of the state of Vermont as the 14th State (which was formed within what New York claimed as its territory, under an Order in Council, that King George III issued on July 20, 1764).
- October 10 – At least 3,000 people die in Algeria when an earthquake and tsunami strikes the city of Oran. The city is destroyed and Spanish forces eventually flee in 1792.
- October–December – Vincent Ogé leads a rebellion of freed blacks in Saint-Domingue. The rebellion is suppressed and Ogé executed.
- November 27 – France's Constituent Assembly passes a law requiring all Roman Catholic priests to swear an oath of acceptance of the new French Constitution.
- November 27 – U.S. President George Washington and his wife, Martha Washington, arrive in the new temporary U.S. capital, Philadelphia, and take up residence at the President's House located at 524 Market Street.
- December 2 – Holy Roman Empire forces recapture Brussels, bringing an end to the short-lived United States of Belgium and restoring the Austrian Netherlands.
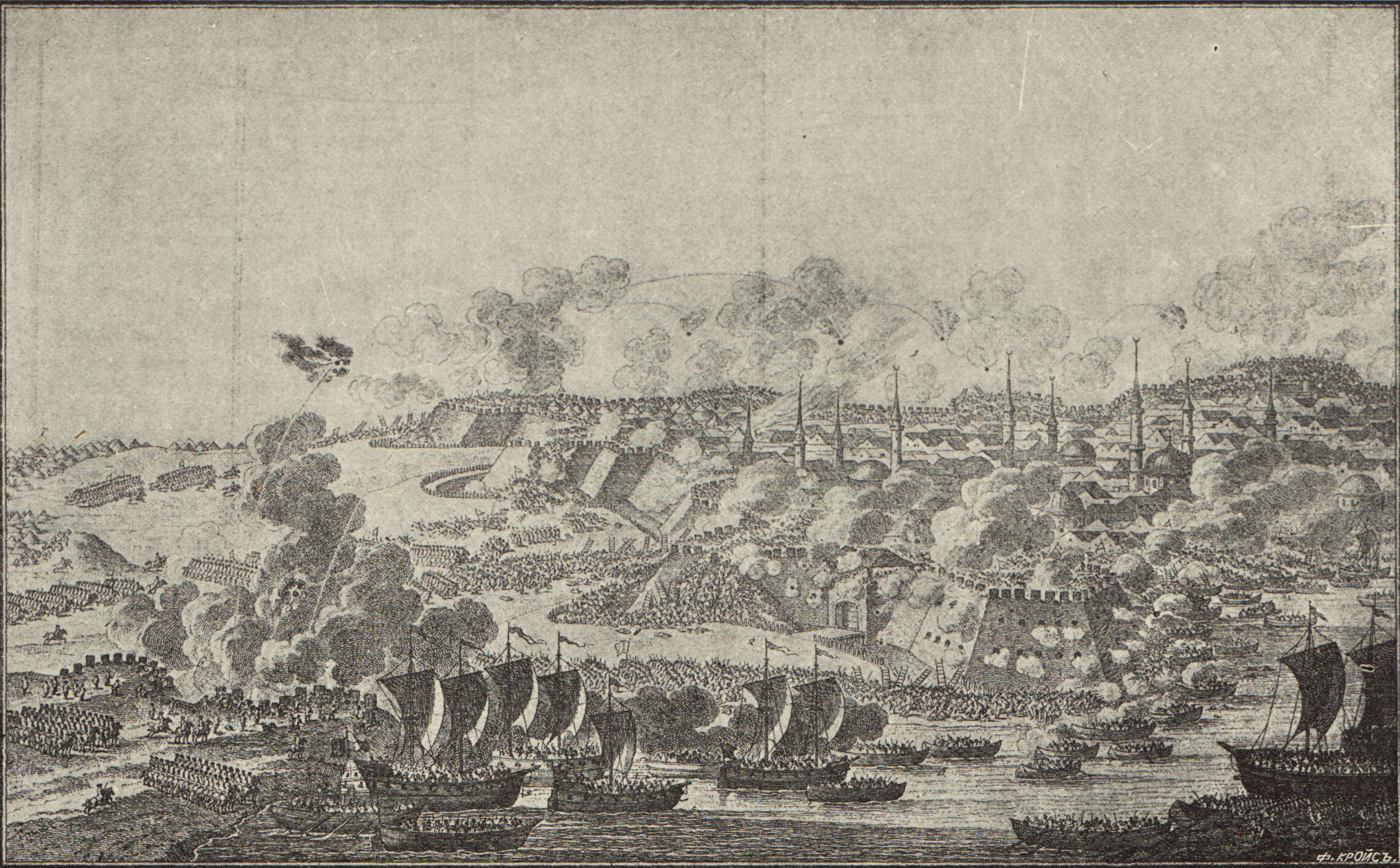
  December 22: Capture of Izmail
- December 6 – The United States Congress opens its first session in the new temporary U.S. capital in Philadelphia.
- December 10 – The Hawkesbury and Nepean Wars begin in New South Wales, Australia, as a result of deterioration in relations and increasing colonization.
- December 17 – The Aztec calendar stone is discovered at El Zócalo, Mexico City.
- December 22 – Russo-Turkish War (1787–92): The Turkish fortress of Izmail is stormed and captured by Alexander Suvorov and his Russian armies. During Suvorov's storm of Izmail, 26,000 Turkish soldiers lose their lives.
- December 26 – Louis XVI gives his public assent to Civil Constitution of the Clergy during the French Revolution.

=== January–March ===
- January 1 – Austrian composer Joseph Haydn arrives in England, to perform a series of concerts.
- January 2 – Northwest Indian War: Big Bottom Massacre – The war begins in the Ohio Country, with this massacre.
- January 12 – Holy Roman troops reenter Liège, heralding the end of the Liège Revolution, and the restoration of its Prince-Bishops.
- January 25 – The British Parliament passes the Constitutional Act 1791, splitting the old province of Quebec into Upper and Lower Canada.
- February 8 – The Bank of the United States, based in Philadelphia, is incorporated by the federal government with a 20-year charter and started with $10,000,000 capital.
- February 21 – The United States opens diplomatic relations with Portugal.
- March 2 – French Revolution:
  - The abolition of guilds is enacted.
  - A mechanical semaphore line for rapid long-distance communication is demonstrated by Claude Chappe in Paris.
- March 4 – Vermont is admitted as the 14th U.S. state.
- March 13 – Thomas Paine's chief work Rights of Man (first part) is published in London.
- March – French Revolution: In France, the National Constituent Assembly accepts the recommendation of its Commission of Weights and Measures that the nation should adopt the metric system.

=== April–June ===
- April 21 – The first of forty boundary markers of the original District of Columbia, delineating the borders of the new District in the United States is laid at Jones Point Light in Alexandria, Virginia.
- April 29–May 8 – The first American ships reach Japan, brigantine Lady Washington captained by John Kendrick of Boston, and the brig Grace.
- May 3 – The Sejm of the Polish–Lithuanian Commonwealth proclaims the Constitution of May 3, 1791, the first modern codified constitution in Europe.
- June 20 – French Revolution: Flight to Varennes – The French Royal Family is captured when they try to flee in disguise.
- June 21 – The Ordnance Survey is founded in Great Britain for the production of maps.

=== July–September ===
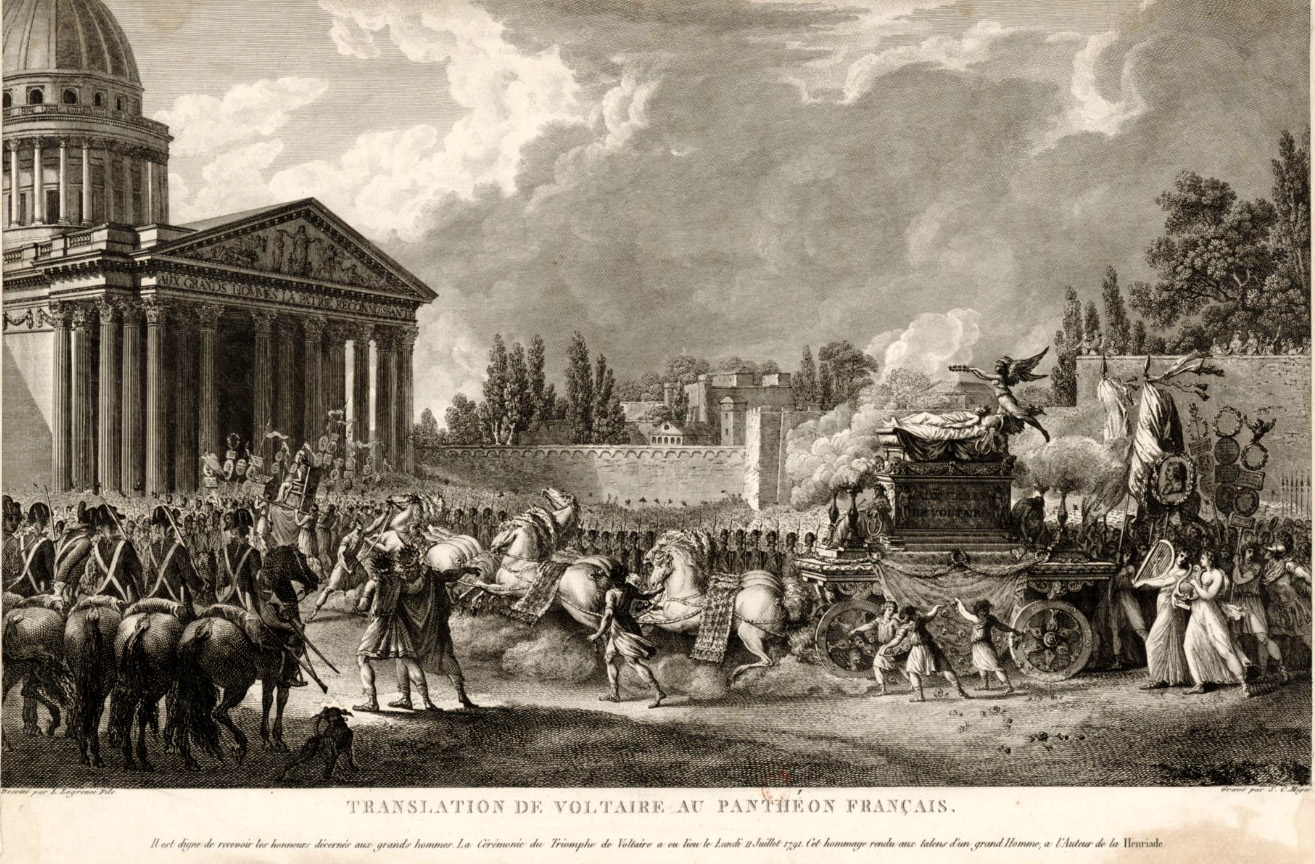
Translation of Voltaire

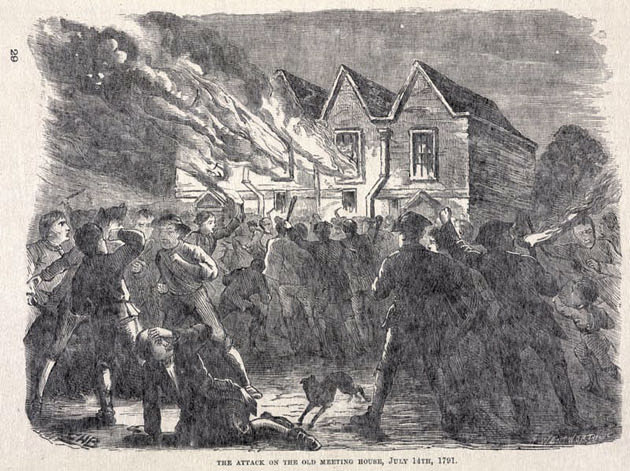
Priestley Riots

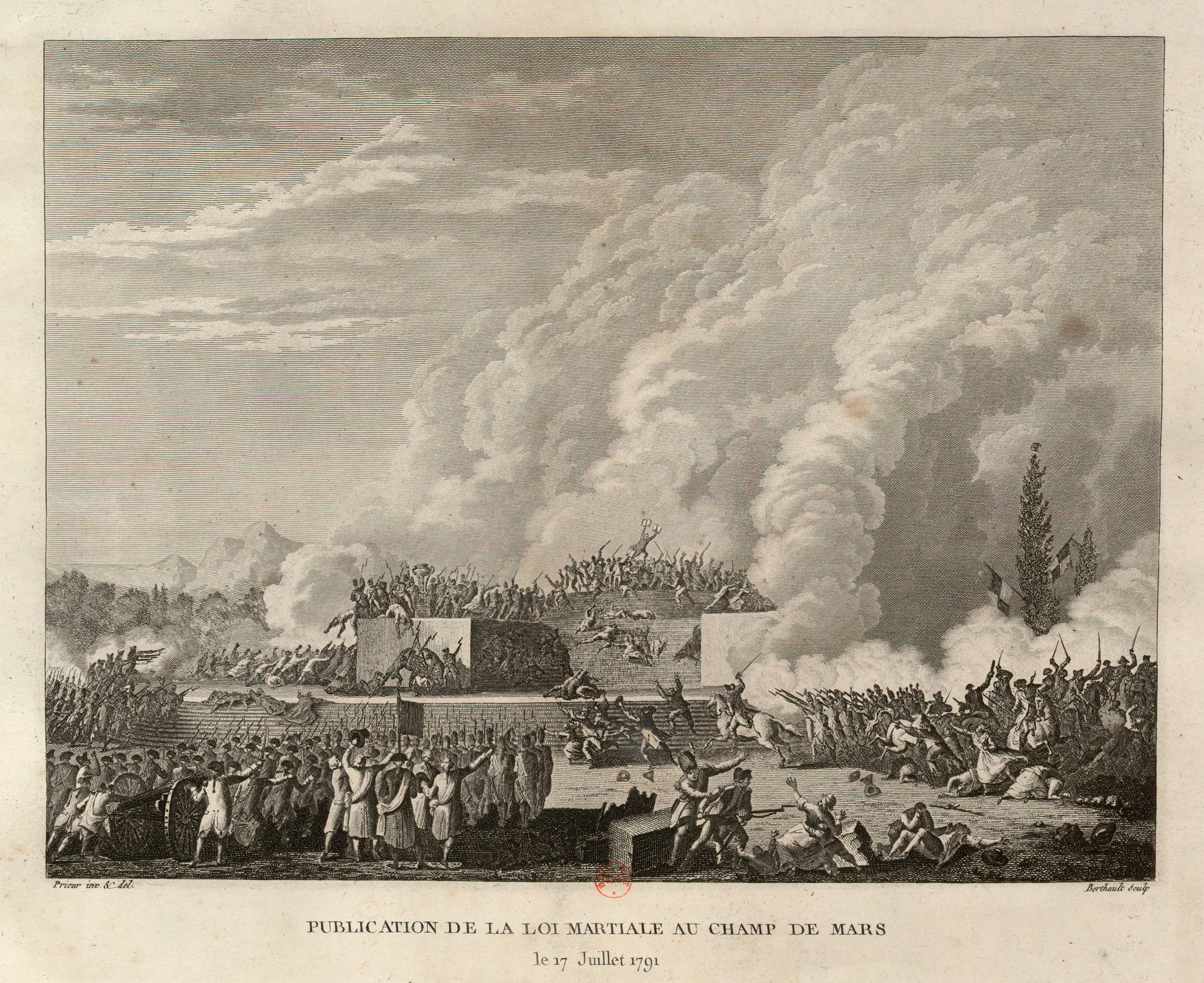
Champ de Mars massacre

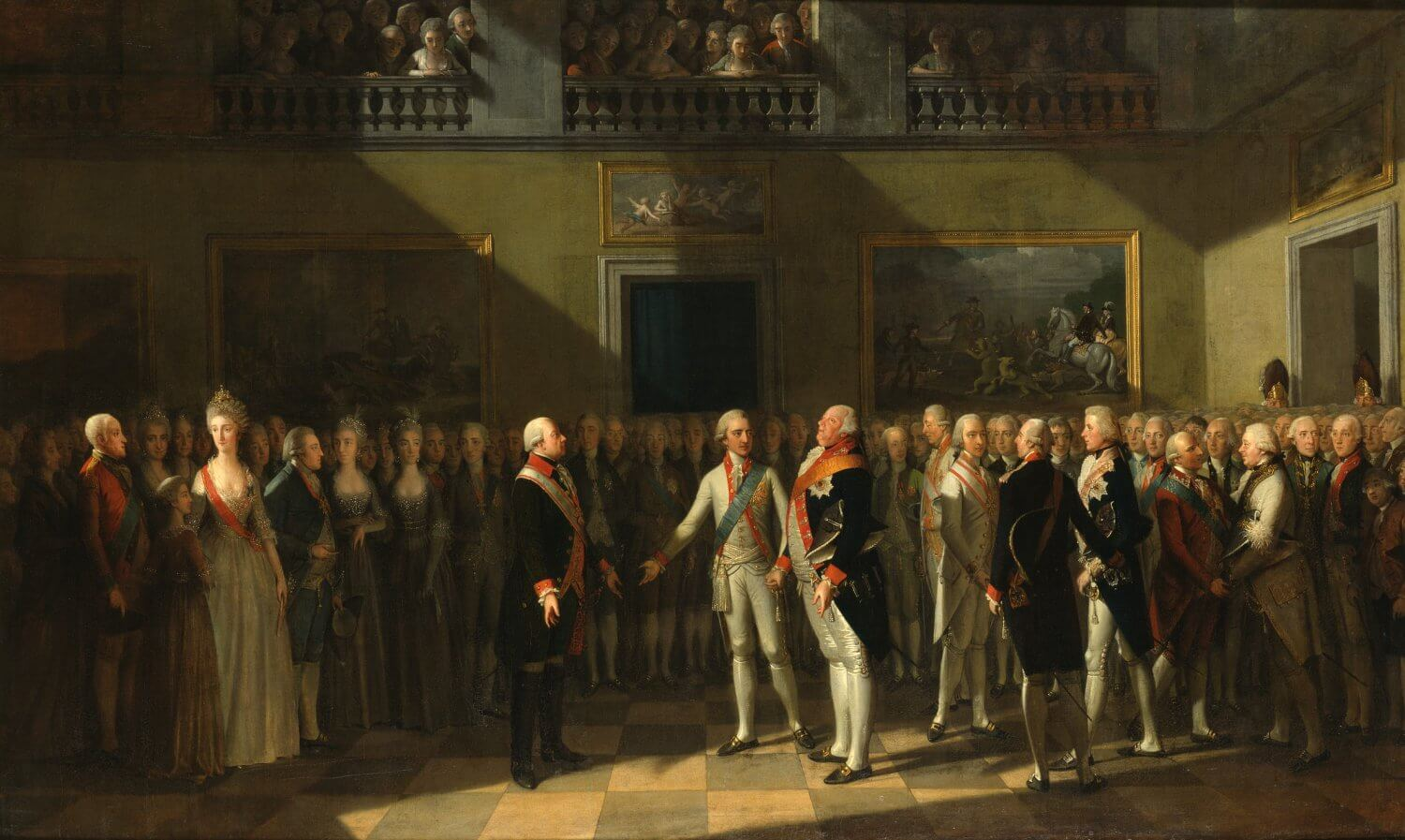
Declaration of Pillnitz
- July 8 – Austrian composer Joseph Haydn, on his visit to England, is awarded an honorary doctorate of music at the University of Oxford.
- July 11 – The ashes of Voltaire are transferred to the Panthéon in Paris.
- July 14–17 – Priestley Riots against Dissenters in Birmingham, England.
- July 17 – French Revolution: The Champ de Mars massacre occurs in Paris.
- August 4 – The Treaty of Sistova is signed, ending the Ottoman–Habsburg wars.
- August 6 – The Brandenburg Gate in Berlin (Prussia) is finished.
- August 7 – George Hammond is appointed as Great Britain's first minister to the United States.
- August 21 – Haitian Revolution: A slave rebellion breaks out in the French colony of Saint-Domingue.
- August 26 – John Fitch is granted a patent for the steamboat in the United States.
- August 27
  - Declaration of Pillnitz: A proclamation by Frederick William II of Prussia and the Habsburg Leopold II, Holy Roman Emperor, affirms their wish to "put the King of France in a state to strengthen the bases of monarchic government."
  - Third Anglo-Mysore War: Battle of Tellicherry – Off the south-west coast of India, a British Royal Navy patrol forces a French convoy bound for Mysore to surrender.
- September 5
  - An ordinance is written barring the game of baseball within 80 yards of the Meeting House in Pittsfield, Massachusetts, the first known reference to the game of baseball in North America.
  - Declaration of the Rights of Woman and of the Female Citizen is written by activist Olympe de Gouges in response to the Declaration of the Rights of Man and of the Citizen.
- September 6 – Wolfgang Amadeus Mozart's opera seria, La clemenza di Tito, premières at the Estates Theatre in Prague with Mozart conducting to mark the coronation of Leopold II as King of Bohemia.
- September 9 – The capital of the United States, Washington, D.C., is named after the incumbent 1st President George Washington.
- September 12 – The first serious secondary education school open to girls in Denmark, the Døtreskolen af 1791, is founded in Copenhagen.
- September 13 – French Revolution: King Louis XVI accepts the final version of the completed constitution.
- September 14 – French Revolution: The Papal States lose Avignon to Revolutionary France.
- September 25 – Mission Santa Cruz is founded by Basque Franciscan Father Fermín Lasuén, becoming the 12th mission in the California mission chain.
- September 28 – French Revolution: The law on Jewish emancipation is promulgated in France, the first such legislation in modern Europe.
- September 30 – Wolfgang Amadeus Mozart's singspiel opera The Magic Flute (Die Zauberflöte) premières at the Freihaus-Theater auf der Wieden in Vienna with Mozart conducting.

=== October–December ===
- October 1 – French Revolution: The Legislative Assembly (France) convenes.
- October 9 – Mission Nuestra Señora de la Soledad is founded by Father Fermín Lasuén, becoming the 13th mission in the California mission chain.
- October 19 – The Treaty of Drottningholm is signed between the Russian Empire and Sweden establishing an alliance between the two.
- October 28 – French Revolution: The Declaration of the Rights of Woman and of the Female Citizen is published in France.
- November 4 – St. Clair's Defeat, the worst loss suffered by the United States Army in fighting against American Indians, takes place in modern-day Mercer County, Ohio. Miami fighters led by Chief Mihsihkinaahkwa (Little Turtle) and by Shawnee warriors commanded by War Chief Weyapiersenwah (Blue Jacket) rout the forces of General Arthur St. Clair and kill 630 U.S. soldiers, along with hundreds of civilians.
- December 4 – The first issue of The Observer, the world's first Sunday newspaper, is published in London.
- December 5 – Austrian composer Wolfgang Amadeus Mozart dies early this morning aged 35 at his home in Vienna, having been bedridden since November 20 with a serious illness, perhaps acute rheumatic fever. On a mild and misty December 7, following a funeral service in St. Stephen's Cathedral, he is buried in a common unmarked grave (as customary at this time) in St. Marx Cemetery in the presence of Salieri, Süssmayr, van Swieten (his patron) and two other musicians.
- December 15 – Ratification by the states of the first ten amendments to the United States Constitution is completed, creating the United States Bill of Rights. Two additional amendments remain pending, and one of these is finally ratified in 1992, becoming the Twenty-seventh Amendment.
- December 23 – The Pale of Settlement is established by ukase of Catherine the Great, specifying those areas of the Russian Empire in which Jews are permitted permanent residency.

=== Date unknown ===
- The School for the Indigent Blind, the oldest continuously operating specialist school of its kind in the world, is founded in Liverpool, England, by blind ex-merchant seaman, writer and abolitionist Edward Rushton.
- Camembert cheese reputedly first made by Marie Harel, a farmer from Normandy.
- The Dar Hassan Pacha (palace) in the Casbah of Algiers is completed.
- The first printed manuscript of Dream of the Red Chamber by Cao Xueqin, one of the Classic Chinese Novels, begins publication posthumously.

=== January–March ===
- January 9 – The Treaty of Jassy ends the Russian Empire's war with the Ottoman Empire over Crimea.
- January 25 – The London Corresponding Society is founded.
- February 18 – Thomas Holcroft produces the comedy The Road to Ruin in London.
- February 20
  - The Postal Service Act, establishing the United States Post Office Department, is signed by President George Washington.
  - Parliament House, Dublin catches fire during a legislative session. "Although in imminent danger of the roof falling in," it is noted later, "the House did not adjourn until a proper motion had been put and carried in the affirmative."
- March 1 – Francis II, Holy Roman Emperor, the last emperor, takes office.
- March 7 – A settlement is formed in Sierra Leone in West Africa as a home for freed slaves.
- March 16 – Assassination of Gustav III: King Gustav III of Sweden is shot in the back by Jacob Johan Anckarström, at a midnight masquerade at the Royal Opera in Stockholm; he lives until March 29, and is then succeeded by his 14-year-old son, Gustav IV Adolf.
- March 20 – A new capital of North Carolina, and seat of the newly formed Wake County, is established after North Carolina State senator and surveyor William Christmas submits his design for the city. A few months later, the capital is officially named Raleigh, in honor of Sir Walter Raleigh.
- March 22 – Haitian Revolution: Battle of Croix-des-Bouquets – Black slave insurgents gain a victory in the first major battle of the revolution.
- March 25 – The National Legislative Assembly (France) agrees that the guillotine should be used for judicial executions.

=== April–June ===
- April 2 – The Coinage Act is passed, establishing the United States Mint.
- April 5 – United States President George Washington vetoes a bill designed to apportion representatives among U.S. states. This is the first time the presidential veto is used in the United States.
- April 20 – France declares war against Austria, beginning the French Revolutionary Wars and the War of the First Coalition.
- April 21 – Tiradentes, a leading figure in the Inconfidência Mineira conspiracy, is executed in Rio de Janeiro, Brazil.
- April 25
  - Highwayman Nicolas Pelletier becomes the first person executed by guillotine in France.
  - La Marseillaise, the French national anthem, is composed by Claude Joseph Rouget de Lisle.
- May 11 – Robert Gray's Columbia River expedition: Captain Robert Gray, on the Columbia Rediviva, becomes the first white man to discover the mouth of the Columbia River.
- May 17 – The Buttonwood Agreement is signed, beginning the New York Stock Exchange.
- May 18 – War in Defence of the Constitution: Russia invades Poland.
- May 21 – 1792 Unzen earthquake and tsunami: An old lava dome collapses in Kyūshū, Japan, due to activity of Mount Unzen volcano; the resulting avalanche and tsunami kill about 14,300 people.
- May 29 – The Great Sejm of the Polish–Lithuanian Commonwealth is disbanded following the Russian invasion of Poland.
- June 1 – Kentucky becomes the 15th state of the United States of America.
- June 4 – Captain George Vancouver claims Puget Sound for Great Britain.
- June 13
  - Vancouver becomes the first European to enter Burrard Inlet.
  - Prussia declares war against France.

=== July–September ===
- July 18 – Polish–Russian War: Battle of Dubienka – Soldiers of the Polish–Lithuanian Commonwealth, led by Tadeusz Kościuszko, resist an attack from Imperial Russian Army forces five times their size.
- July 25 – Charles William Ferdinand, Duke of Brunswick, commander of the Allied army issues the Brunswick Manifesto threatening the Parisians with military execution and complete destruction should the French royal family be harmed in any way.
- August 10 – French Revolution: Insurrection of 10 August 1792 – The Tuileries Palace is stormed and Louis XVI is arrested and taken into custody.
- August 29–September 2 – War of the First Coalition: Battle of Verdun – Prussian forces defeat French troops led by Nicolas-Joseph Beaurepaire.
- August 21 – Royalist Louis Collenot d'Angremont becomes the first person executed by guillotine for political reasons, in Paris.
- September – Macartney Embassy: George Macartney, 1st Earl Macartney, sails from Portsmouth in HMS Lion as the first official envoy from Great Britain to China.
- September 2–7 – French Revolution: September Massacres – Rampaging mobs slaughter three Roman Catholic bishops and more than 200 priests, together with at least 1,000 other criminals.
- September 11 – Six men steal some of the former French Crown Jewels from a warehouse where the revolutionary government has stored them.
- September 12 – The town of Fort Borbon is founded by Governor Joaquín Alós y Bru. Nowadays it is called Fuerte Olimpo.
- September 14 – Radical antimonarchist Thomas Paine flees from England to France after being indicted for treason. He is tried in absentia during December and outlawed.

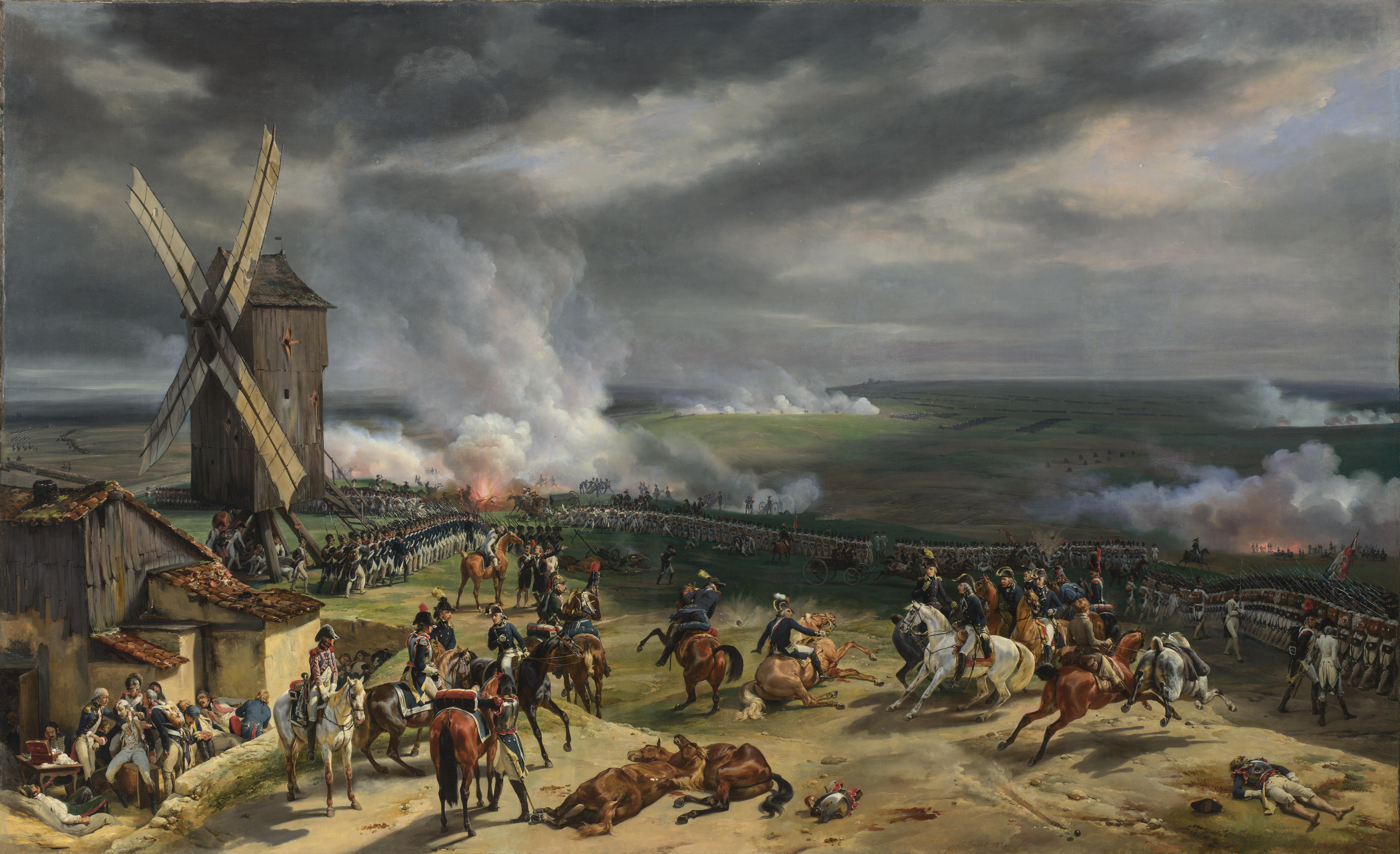
September 20: Battle of Valmy.

- September 20 – French Revolutionary Wars: Battle of Valmy – The French revolutionary army defeats the Prussians under the Duke of Brunswick after a 7-hour artillery duel.
- September 21 – French Revolution: A Proclamation of the abolition of the monarchy by the French Convention goes into effect, and the French First Republic is established, effective the following day.
- September 22 – French Revolution: The Era of the historical French Republican Calendar begins.
- September 30 – Chickamauga Cherokee launch an attack on Middle Tennessee to exterminate the White settlers; they are stopped at the opening battle at Buchanan's Station outside Nashboro.

=== October–December ===
- October 2 – The Baptist Missionary Society is founded in Kettering, England.
- October 3 – A militia departs from the Spanish stronghold of Valdivia to quell a Huilliche uprising in southern Chile.
- October 12 – The first Columbus Day celebration in the United States is held in New York City, 300 years after his arrival in the New World.
- October 13 – Foundation of Washington, D.C.: The cornerstone of the United States Executive Mansion (known as the White House after 1818) is laid.

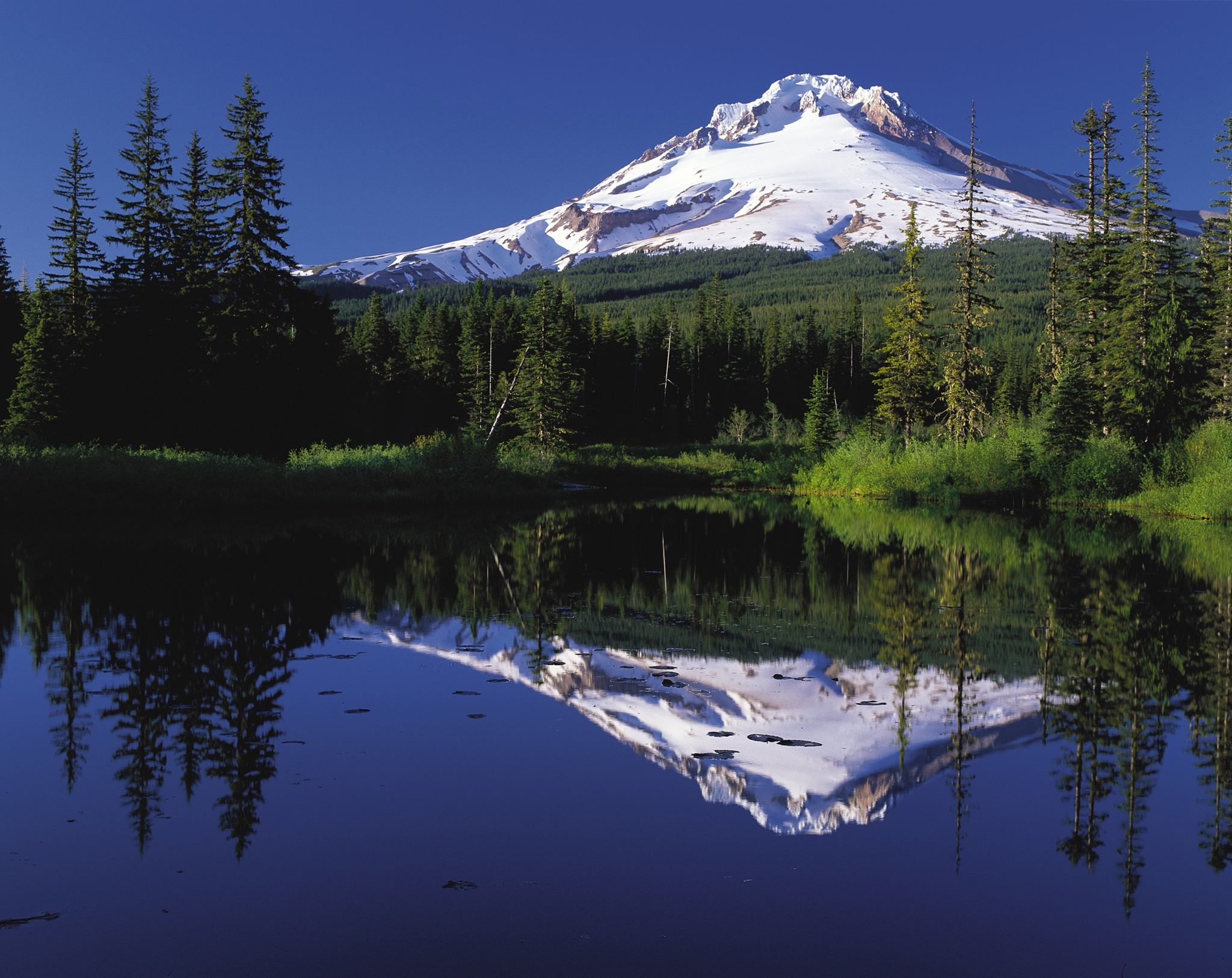
October 29: Mount Hood is named.

- October 29 – Mount Hood (Oregon) is named after British Admiral Lord Hood by Lt. William Broughton of the Vancouver Expedition, who spots the mountain near the mouth of the Willamette River.
- November 6
  - War of the First Coalition: Battle of Jemappes – Austrian armies under the command of Duke Albert of Saxe-Teschen are defeated in Belgium (at this time part of the Austrian Netherlands) by the French Army led by General Charles François Dumouriez.
  - The second United States presidential election is held. Incumbent President George Washington receives all 132 electoral votes for president, and incumbent Vice President John Adams is re-elected with 77 of 132 votes, with George Clinton receiving 50.
- November 19 – France's National Convention passes a resolution pledging French support for the overthrow of the governments of other nations.
- November 29 – War of the First Coalition: The Siege of Antwerp ends with the surrender of the Austrian garrison
- December 3 – George Washington is re-elected president of the United States.
- December 26 – The trial of Louis XVI of France begins.

=== Date unknown ===
- Tipu Sultan invades Kerala, India, but is repulsed.
- Hungarian astronomer Franz Xaver von Zach publishes The Tables of the Sun, an essential early work for navigation.
- Claude Chappe successfully demonstrates the first semaphore line, between Paris and Lille.
- Scottish engineer William Murdoch begins experimenting with gas lighting.
- George Anschutz constructs the first blast furnace in Pittsburgh, Pennsylvania.
- Mary Wollstonecraft's A Vindication of the Rights of Woman, one of the earliest works of feminist literature, is published in London.
- Barthélemy Catherine Joubert, future French general, becomes sub-lieutenant.
- Johann Georg Albrechtsberger becomes Kapellmeister in Vienna.
- The State Street Corporation is founded, in Boston, Massachusetts.
- The Insurance Company of North America (later Chubb) is founded in Philadelphia, Pennsylvania.
- Shiloh Meeting House, predecessor of Shiloh United Methodist Church in Lynchburg, Virginia, is founded.
- The first written examinations in Europe are held at the University of Cambridge in England.
- The composer Ludwig van Beethoven moves to Vienna from Bonn to study with Haydn. He would live in Vienna for the rest of his life.
- James Johnstone establishes that Vancouver Island is an island.

=== January–June ===
- January 2 – Premiere of Mozart's Requiem (completed after the composer's death in 1791 by Franz Xaver Süssmayr) in a performace for the benefit of Mozart's widow, Constanze.
- January 7 – The Ebel riot occurs in Sweden.
- January 9 – Jean-Pierre Blanchard becomes the first to fly in a gas balloon in the United States.
- January 13 – Nicolas Jean Hugon de Bassville, a representative of Revolutionary France, is lynched by a mob in Rome.
- January 21 – French Revolution: After being found guilty of treason by the French National Convention, Citizen Capet, formerly King Louis XVI, is guillotined in Paris.
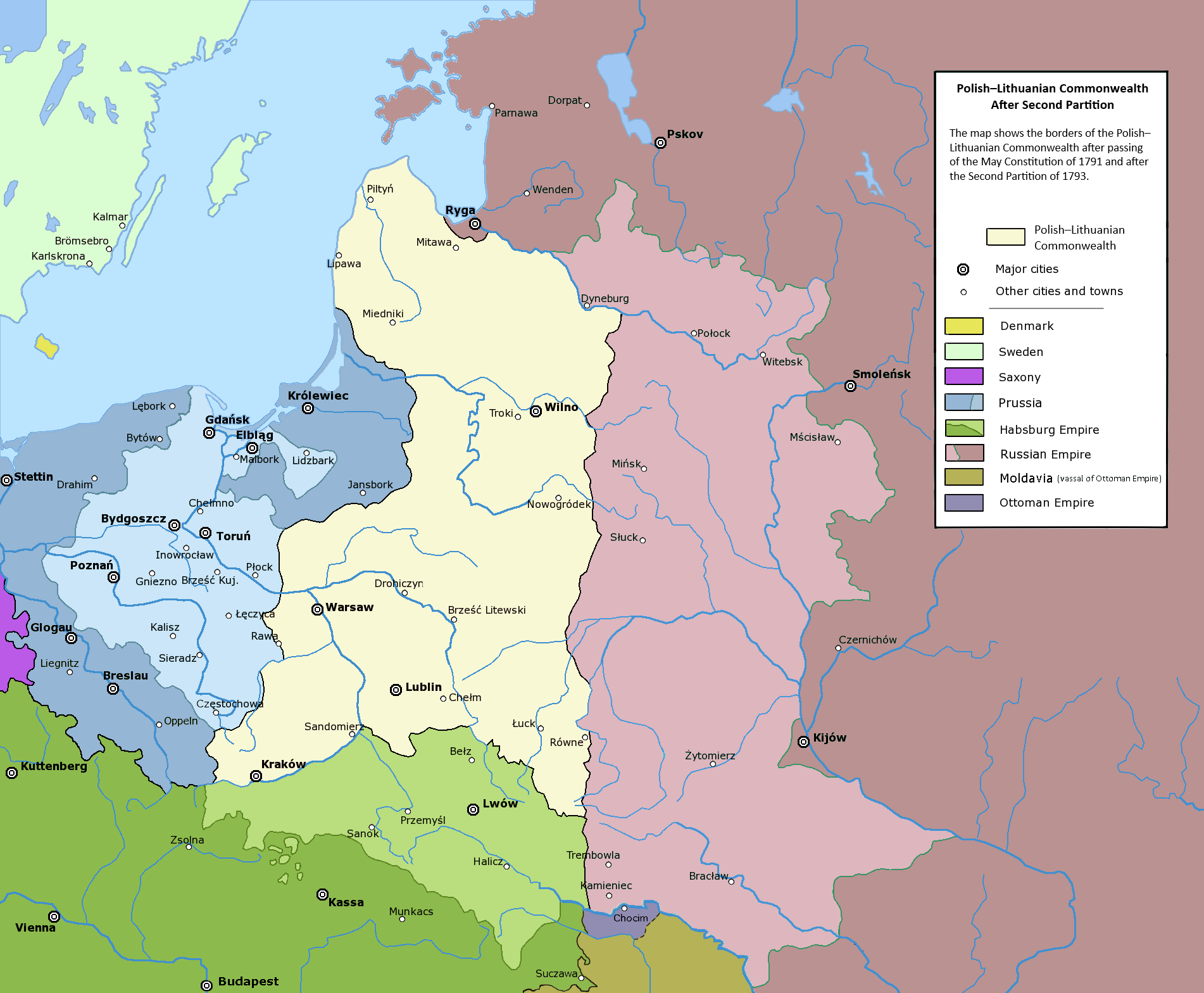
  Second Partition of Poland in 1793
- January 23 – Second Partition of Poland: The Russian Empire and the Kingdom of Prussia partition the Polish–Lithuanian Commonwealth.
- February – In Manchester, Vermont, the wife of a captain falls ill, probably with tuberculosis. Some locals believe that the cause of her illness is that a demon vampire is sucking her blood. As a cure, Timothy Mead burns the heart of a deceased person in front of a crowd of a few hundred people.
- February 1 – French Revolutionary Wars: The French First Republic declares war on Great Britain, the Dutch Republic and (on March 7) Spain. During the year, the War of the First Coalition is joined by Portugal, the Holy Roman Empire, Naples and Tuscany in opposition to France.
- February 11 – French expedition to Sardinia (Expédition de Sardaigne): A French fleet under admiral Laurent Truguet debarks troops near Cagliari in Sardinia.
- February 22 – French expedition to Sardinia: A small French and Corsican force briefly occupies the small Sardinian island of La Maddalena, then withdraws to Corsica. 23-year-old lieutenant Napoleon Buonaparte is second-in-command.
- February 25 – George Washington holds the first Cabinet meeting as President of the United States.
- February 27 – The Giles Resolutions are introduced to the United States House of Representatives, asking the House to condemn Alexander Hamilton's handling of loans.
- March 1–3 – John Langdon serves as President pro tempore of the United States Senate.
- March 4 – George Washington is sworn in as the president of the United States in Philadelphia, for his second term.
- March 5 – French troops are defeated by Austrian forces, and Liège is recaptured.
- March 18
  - Second Battle of Neerwinden: A coalition army of Habsburg monarchy and Dutch Republic troops repulses attacks from French Republican forces, near Neerwinden, Flemish Brabant.
  - The first republican state in Germany, the Republic of Mainz, is declared by Andreas Joseph Hofmann.
- April 6 – French Revolutionary Wars: The Committee of Public Safety is established in France, with Georges Danton as its head.
- April 9 – Edmond-Charles Genêt, France's new Minister to the United States, arrives at Charleston, South Carolina.
- April 22 – George Washington signs the Neutrality Proclamation.
- April 25 – The pioneer parishes of New Orleans and Louisiana are erected, as well as incorporated into the Roman Catholic Diocese of Louisiana and the Two Floridas.
- May 25 – French expedition to Sardinia: The last French troops occupying the small Sardinian island of San Pietro surrender to a Spanish fleet.
- May 31 – French Revolution: Regular troops under François Hanriot demand that the Girondins be expelled from the National Convention.
- June – The Macartney Embassy, a British diplomatic mission to China led by George Macartney, 1st Earl Macartney, reaches Canton, but will be rebuffed by the Qianlong Emperor.
- June 2 – French Revolution: The Girondins are overthrown in France.
- June 10 – French Revolution: The Jardin des Plantes and the Muséum national d'histoire naturelle are created by the National Convention. The museum opens in Paris the following year, and the garden houses one of the first public zoos.
- June 20–22 – Haitian Revolution: Battle of Cap-Français – French Republican troops and black slave insurgents defeat Royalist and slave owner settlers.
- June 21 – The town of Hamilton, Massachusetts, is incorporated.

=== July–December ===
- July 9 – The Act Against Slavery is passed in Upper Canada.
- July 13 – French Revolution: Charlotte Corday kills Jean-Paul Marat in his bath.
- July 17 – French Revolution: Charlotte Corday is executed.
- July 20 – Scottish explorer Alexander Mackenzie's 1792–1793 Peace River expedition to the Pacific Ocean reaches its goal at Bella Coola, British Columbia, making him the first known person to complete a transcontinental crossing of northern North America.
- July 29 – John Graves Simcoe decides to build a fort and settlement at Toronto, having sailed into the bay there.
- July 31 – Oulu Castle in Finland is destroyed in an explosion following the burning of a powder cellar.
- August – France decrees all the slaves on Saint-Domingue to be free.
- August 1–November 9 – The yellow fever epidemic of 1793 hits Philadelphia, Pennsylvania; 5,000 die.
- August 10 – French Revolution – Feast of Unity
  - Crowds in Paris burn monarchist emblems.
  - The Louvre in Paris opens to the public as an art museum.
- August 23 – French Revolution: The following universal conscription decree is enacted in France: "The young men shall go to battle and the married men shall forge arms. The women shall make tents and clothes and shall serve in the hospitals; children shall tear rags into lint. The old men will be guided to the public places of the cities to kindle the courage of the young warriors and to preach the unity of the Republic and the hatred of kings."
- September 5 – French Revolution: The National Convention begins the 10-month Reign of Terror.
- September 8 – The first Círio de Nazaré is celebrated in Belém.
- September 17 – The Army of the Eastern Pyrenees, one of the French Revolutionary armies, defeats a Spanish force at the Battle of Peyrestortes.
- September 18 – The cornerstone to the future United States Capitol is dedicated by U.S. President Washington at the site of the new Federal City on the Potomac River.
- September 20 – British troops from Jamaica land on the island of Saint-Domingue to join the Haitian Revolution in opposition to the French Republic and its newly-freed slaves; on 22 September the main French naval base on the island surrenders peacefully to the Royal Navy.
- October 5 – War of the First Coalition: Raid on Genoa – The British Royal Navy boards and captures French warships, sheltering in the neutral port of Genoa.
- October 15–16 – War of the First Coalition: Battle of Wattignies – A French Republican force commanded by Jean-Baptiste Jourdan compels a Habsburg Austrian Coalition army to retire.
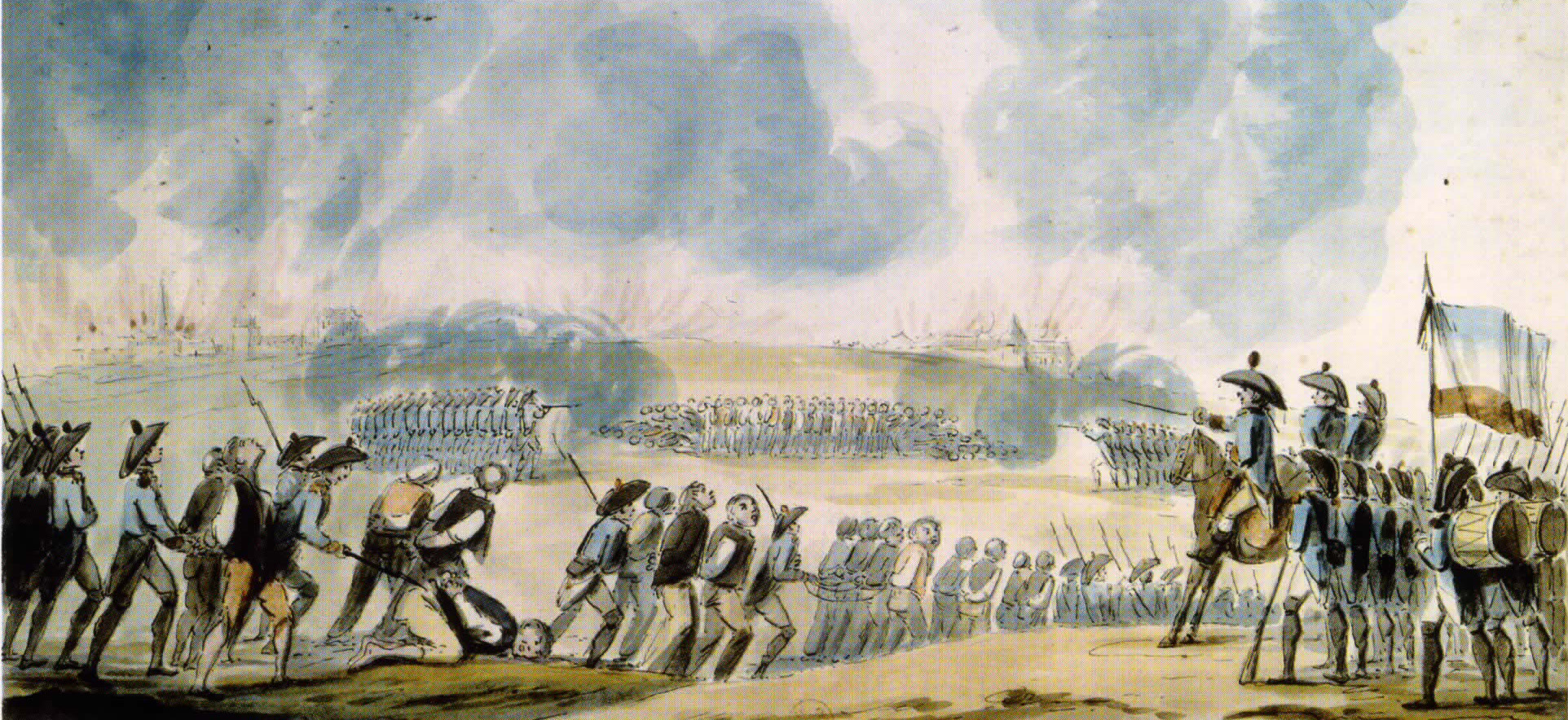
  Mass killings in the Vendée during the Reign of Terror in France
- October 16 – French Revolution: Marie Antoinette, the widowed queen consort of Louis XVI, is guillotined in the Place de la Révolution in Paris at the conclusion of a 2-day trial before the Revolutionary Tribunal.
- October 24 – French Revolution:The French Republican Calendar is adopted by the National Convention.
- November 10 – The dechristianization of France during the French Revolution reaches a climax with the celebration of the Goddess of Reason in the cathedral of Notre Dame de Paris.
- November 12 – French Revolution: Jean Sylvain Bailly, the first Mayor of Paris, is guillotined.
- December 8 – French Revolution: Madame du Barry is guillotined.
- December 9 – New York City's first daily newspaper, the American Minerva, is established by Noah Webster.
- December 18 – French forces under Dugommier capture Toulon from royalists and British forces under Vice Admiral Lord Hood. The British fire the dockyards and take 16 ships, one of which, the Lutine, becomes a famous treasure ship.
- December 23 – French Revolution: War in the Vendée: Battle of Savenay – A Republican force decisively defeats the counterrevolutionary Catholic and Royal Army, ending the Virée de Galerne.

=== Undated ===
- Eli Whitney invents a cotton gin. This causes a resurgence of slavery in the South.
- Lawrence Academy (Groton, Massachusetts) is chartered.
- Dominique Jean Larrey, chief surgeon of the French Revolutionary Army, creates the first battlefield "flying ambulance" service.
- The Al Bu Falah move to Abu Dhabi.
- The first year of regular production begins for the United States Mint, and the half cent is minted for the first time.
- Niccolò Paganini debuts as a violin virtuoso at age 11 in his birthplace of Genoa.

=== January–March ===
- January 1 – The Stibo Group is founded by Niels Lund as a printing company in Aarhus (Denmark).
- January 13 – The U.S. Congress enacts a law providing for, effective May 1, 1795, a United States flag of 15 stars and 15 stripes, in recognition of the recent admission of Vermont and Kentucky as the 14th and 15th states. A subsequent act restores the number of stripes to 13, but provides for additional stars upon the admission of each additional state.
- January 21 – King George III of Great Britain delivers the speech opening Parliament and recommends a continuation of Britain's war with France.
- February 4 – French Revolution: The National Convention of the French First Republic abolishes slavery.
- February 8 – Wreck of the Ten Sail on Grand Cayman.
- February 11 – The first session of the United States Senate is open to the public.
- March 4 – The Eleventh Amendment to the United States Constitution is passed by Congress for submission to the states for ratification.
- March 11 – Canonsburg Academy (modern-day Washington & Jefferson College) is chartered by the Pennsylvania General Assembly.
- March 12 – General Antoni Madaliński, a commander of the National Cavalry in the Polish–Lithuanian Commonwealth, disobeys an order from the ruling Russian Empire and Kingdom of Prussia imposing demobilization, advancing his troops from Ostrołęka to Kraków.
- March 14 – Eli Whitney is granted a United States patent for the cotton gin.
- March 22 – Congress prohibits American ships from supplying slaves to any nation other than the United States, setting a penalty of forfeiture of the ship and a $2,000 fine.
- March 23 – British troops capture Martinique from the French.
- March 24 – Tadeusz Kościuszko makes his proclamation starting the Kościuszko Uprising against the Russian Empire and Kingdom of Prussia in the Polish–Lithuanian Commonwealth and Prussian Partition.
- March 26 – The U.S. lays a 60-day embargo on all shipping to and from Great Britain.
- March 27
  - The United States Government authorizes the building of the first six United States Navy vessels; in 1797 the first three frigates, United States, Constellation and Constitution will go into service (not to be confused with October 13, 1775, which is observed as the Navy's Birthday).
  - The U.S. Senate passes a rule ending its policy of closing all of its sessions to the public.

=== April–June ===
- April 4 – Battle of Racławice: Polish supporters of the Kościuszko Uprising defeat forces of the Russian Empire.
- April 5 – Reign of Terror: Georges Danton and Camille Desmoulins are executed.
- April 17–19 – Kościuszko Uprising – Warsaw Uprising: The Polish people overthrow the Russian garrison in Warsaw.
- April 19 – Britain, Prussia and the Netherlands sign a treaty of alliance against France.
- April 28 – Sardinian Vespers: The people of Cagliari in Sardinia oust the viceroy and his Piedmontese functionaries.
- April 29–May 1 – Battle of Boulou: The French defeat the Spanish and Portuguese forces.
- May 7 – Maximilien Robespierre establishes the Cult of the Supreme Being as the new state religion of the French First Republic.
- May 8 – Reign of Terror: chemist Antoine Lavoisier is tried, convicted and executed in Paris with 27 co-defendants also associated with the former ferme générale.
- May 18 – Battle of Tourcoing: French troops defeat British forces.
- May 21 – the French Revolutionary Government decides that the Terror would be centralised, with almost all the tribunals in the provinces closed and all the trials held in Paris.
- May 28–June 1 – The Glorious First of June (Battle of Ushant): The British win a crushing tactical victory over the French fleet, but the merchant convoy escorted by the French fleet arrives safely in France.
- May 30–June 4 – Battle of Port-Républicain: British troops capture Port-au-Prince in Haiti from the French.
- June 17
  - The Anglo-Corsican Kingdom is established.
  - Battle of Mykonos: The British Royal Navy captures French frigate Sibylle.
- June 24 – Bowdoin College is founded in Brunswick, Maine.
- June 26 – Battle of Fleurus: French forces defeat the Austrians and their allies, leading to permanent loss of the Austrian Netherlands and destruction of the Dutch Republic. French use of an observation balloon marks the first participation of an aircraft in battle.
- June–July – Mount Vesuvius erupts in Italy; the town of Torre del Greco is destroyed.

=== July–September ===
- July 12 – Horatio Nelson loses the sight in his right eye in the British Siege of Calvi in Corsica.
- July 13 – Battle of Trippstadt between French forces and those of Prussia and Austria (First Coalition).
- July 13–September 6 – Kościuszko Uprising: Siege of Warsaw – The Polish people resist a siege by armies of the Russian Empire and Kingdom of Prussia.
- July 17 – The sixteen Carmelite Martyrs of Compiègne are guillotined in Paris in the last stage of the French Revolution's Reign of Terror.
- July 27 (9 Thermidor) – French Revolution – Thermidorian Reaction: Maximilien, Augustin Robespierre and Saint-Just are arrested on the orders of the French National Convention; they are executed the next day, ending the French Revolution's Reign of Terror.
- August – Colombian Antonio Nariño is denounced as a traitor after he translates and publishes the French Declaration of the Rights of Man and of the Citizen.
- August 1 – Aristocrats in Sweden gather to mourn the demise of coffee after the beverage is forbidden by royal decree.
- August 9 – Napoleon is arrested and put under house arrest at Nice for his association with the Robespierres during their fall in the Thermidorian Reaction. He is later taken to Antibes and detained in a military fort.
- August 20 – Battle of Fallen Timbers in Northwestern Ohio: American troops under the command of General Anthony Wayne (nicknamed "Mad Anthony") defeat Native American tribes of the Western Confederacy.
- August 21 – British troops capture Corsica following the bombardment by Nelson.
- August 29 – Stonyhurst College is finally established as a Roman Catholic school in Lancashire, England, having had several European locations.
- September 10 – The University of Tennessee is established at Knoxville.
- September 23 – France occupies Aachen.
- September 28 – Austria, Britain and Russia ally against France.

=== October–December ===
- October 2 – Battle of Aldenhoven between French forces and those of Austria.
- October 4 – In the first and only instance of an incumbent United States president leading men into battle, George Washington arrives at Carlisle, Pennsylvania to guide the U.S. Army's suppression of the Whiskey Rebellion. The rebels soon disperse and the insurrection collapses by the end of the month.
- October 10 – Battle of Maciejowice: Forces of the Russian Empire defeat Polish supporters of the Kościuszko Uprising; Tadeusz Kościuszko is wounded and captured.
- October 22 – Fort Wayne founded in what is now the U.S. state of Indiana.
- November 4 – Battle of Praga: Russian General Alexander Suvorov storms Warsaw in the war against the Polish Kościuszko Uprising and captures Praga, one of its suburbs, unwittingly killing many civilians.
- November 14 – The first recorded meeting of the Franklin Literary Society is held at Canonsburg Academy (modern-day Washington & Jefferson College).
- November 16 – The Kościuszko Uprising ends in the defeat of Tadeusz Kościuszko and his forces.
- November 19 – The United States and Great Britain sign the Jay Treaty (coming into effect in 1796), which attempts to clear up some issues left over from the American Revolutionary War and secures a decade of peaceful trade between the two nations. Britain agrees to evacuate border forts in the Northwest Territory (roughly the area north of the Ohio River and east of the Mississippi) and thereby end British support for the Indians.
- November 20 – Battle of St-Laurent-de-la-Muga fought between French and Spanish forces.
- December 8 – The Great New Orleans Fire (1794) burns over 200 buildings in the French Quarter.
- December 23 – St. Louis Cathedral, New Orleans is dedicated.

=== Date unknown ===
- The Ayrshire (Earl of Carrick's Own) Yeomanry, a British Yeomanry Cavalry Regiment, is formed by the Earl of Cassillis at Culzean Castle, Ayrshire.
- The Oban distillery is built in Scotland.

=== 1795 ===
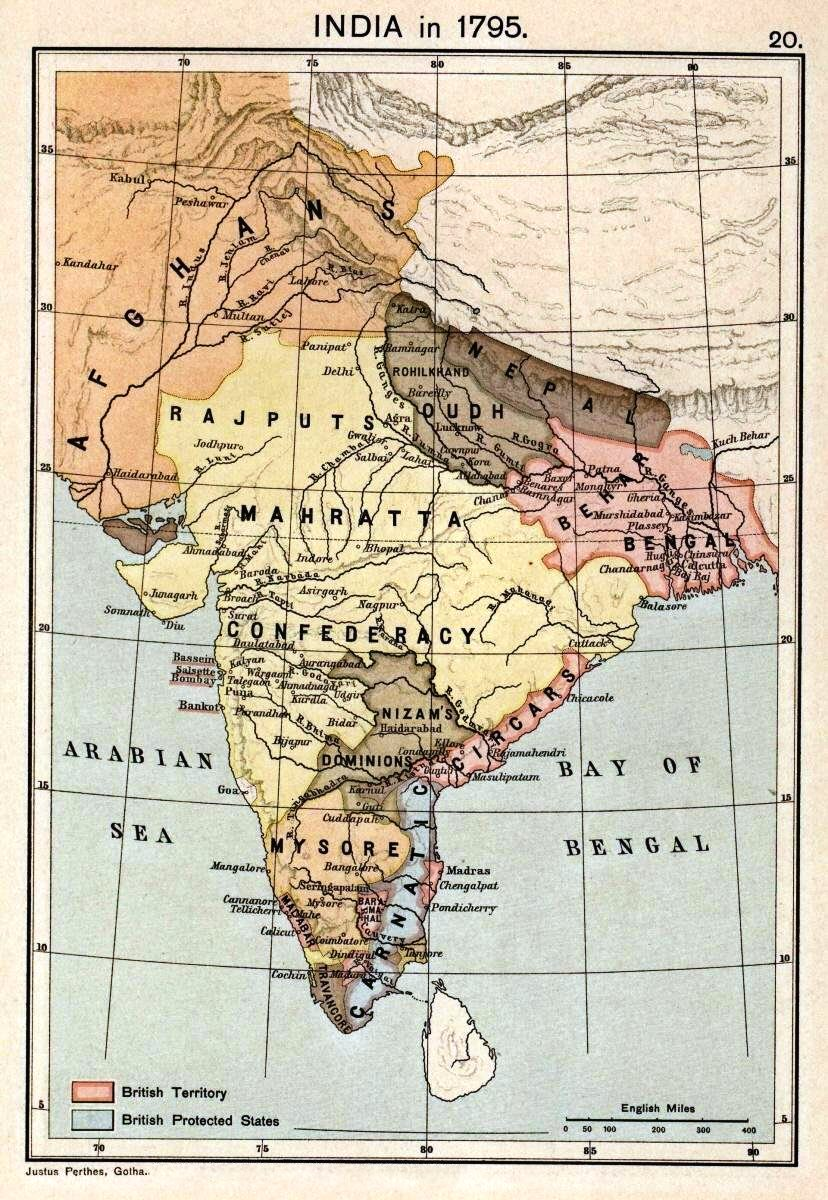
Map of India in 1795, map indicates the political end of the Mogul dynasty in India.

=== January–June ===
- January – Central England records its coldest ever month, in the CET records dating back to 1659.
- January 14 – The University of North Carolina opens to students at Chapel Hill, becoming the first state university in the United States.
- January 16 – War of the First Coalition: Flanders campaign: The French occupy Utrecht, Netherlands.
- January 18 – Batavian Revolution in Amsterdam: William V, Prince of Orange, Stadtholder of the Dutch Republic (Republic of the Seven United Netherlands), flees the country.
- January 19 – The Batavian Republic is proclaimed in Amsterdam, ending the Dutch Republic (Republic of the Seven United Netherlands).
- January 20 – French troops enter Amsterdam.
- January 23 – Flanders campaign: Capture of the Dutch fleet at Den Helder: The Dutch fleet, frozen in Zuiderzee, is captured by the French 8th Hussars.
- February 7 – The Eleventh Amendment to the United States Constitution is passed.
- March – English Benedictine monks expelled from Douai are permitted to proceed to England.
- March 13–14 – War of the First Coalition Battle of Genoa: The British and Neapolitan fleets are victorious over the French.
- March 29 – Ludwig van Beethoven makes his public debut in Vienna performing his Second Piano Concerto under the baton of his teacher Antonio Salieri.
- April 5 – The Peace of Basel is signed, between France and Prussia.
- April 7 – The metric system is adopted in France.
- April 8 – George, Prince of Wales, marries Caroline of Brunswick.
- April 23
  - Former Governor-General of India Warren Hastings is acquitted by the British House of Lords of misconduct.
  - Sweden becomes the first monarchy to recognize the French Republic - Swedish ambassador introduced into the French Convention.
- May 1 – Unification of Hawai‘i: Battle of Nuʻuanu: Kamehameha I of the Island of Hawaii defeats the Oahuans, solidifying his control of the major islands of the archipelago and officially founding the Kingdom of Hawaii.
- May 31 – French Revolution: Revolutionary Tribunal suppressed.
- May–June – The Battle of Richmond Hill is fought in the colony of New South Wales, between the Darug people and British colonial forces.
- June 3 – The Dialectic and Philanthropic Societies are founded at the University of North Carolina at Chapel Hill.
- June 5–7 – The Copenhagen Fire of 1795, starting in a naval warehouse, destroys 941 houses.
- June 8 – Louis XVII, Prince Royal and titular King of France, dies in captivity in the Temple (Paris) and will be buried in an unmarked grave. The heir to the French throne, his uncle Louis XVIII, succeeds him as titular king (he will become the actual king on April 6, 1814). On June 28, the French republican government announces the death, due to mycobacterial cervical lymphadenitis (many doubt the statement).
- June 16–17 – War of the First Coalition: Cornwallis's Retreat – A British Royal Navy battle squadron commanded by William Cornwallis fends off a numerically superior French Navy fleet, off the coast of Brittany.
- June 24 – The United States Senate ratifies the Jay Treaty with Great Britain.
- June 27 – War of the First Coalition:
  - British forces land off Quiberon to aid the revolt in Brittany.
  - French troops recapture St. Lucia.

=== July–December ===
- July 22 – The Second Treaty of Basel is signed between the French First Republic and Spain, ending the War of the Pyrenees. Spain cedes its half of the Caribbean island of Hispaniola to France.
- July 25 – Construction of the Pontcysyllte Aqueduct in Wales begins.
- August 3 – The signing of the Treaty of Greenville puts an end to the Northwest Indian War.
- August 14 – President Washington signs the Jay Treaty with Britain on behalf of the United States.
- August 17 – A large slave rebellion occurs in Curaçao, suppressed the following month.
- August 22 – French Revolution: The Constitution of the Year III is ratified by the National Convention.
- August 25 – British forces capture Trincomalee, Ceylon.
- August 28 – The Third Treaty of Basel is signed, between the French First Republic and the Landgraviate of Hesse-Kassel.
- September 5 – The United States signs a treaty with the Dey of Algiers, ruled by Baba Hassan, pledging the payment of $23,000 a year tribute to prevent piracy against American ships.
- September 11 – Battle of Krtsanisi: The Persian emperor Agha Mohammad Khan Qajar defeats the forces of Heraclius II of Georgia.
- September 15 – French Revolutionary Wars – Invasion of the Cape Colony: British forces capture Cape Town in the Dutch Cape Colony, to use its strategic facilities against the French Navy.
- September 21 – Battle of the Diamond: Protestant forces defeat Catholic troops in Loughgall, Ireland, leading to the foundation of the Orange Order.
- September 28 – The Alliance of St Petersburg is formed between Britain, Russia and Austria against France.
- October 1 – The Austrian Netherlands is annexed to the French Republic, as the Belgian departments.
- October 2 – British forces capture the Île d'Yeu off the coast of Brittany.
- October 5 – 13 Vendémiaire: Royalist riots in Paris are crushed by troops under Paul Barras and newly-reinstalled artillery officer Napoleon Bonaparte.
- October 20 – The United States signs a treaty with Spain, opening commerce along the Mississippi River to the Gulf of Mexico, and establishing boundaries between U.S. territory and Spanish Florida.
- October 24 – The Third Partition of Poland is made, dividing the territory of the Commonwealth of Poland between the Habsburg monarchy, Prussia and the Russian Empire. On November 25, Stanisław August Poniatowski formally abdicates as last King of Poland.
- October 27 – The United States and Spain sign the Treaty of Madrid, which establishes the boundaries between Spanish colonies and the U.S.
- November 2 – French Revolution: The French Directory takes power; the influence of the Sans-culottes declines.
- December 13 – Wold Cottage meteorite: A meteorite falls at Wold Newton, a hamlet in Yorkshire in England. This meteorite fall is subsequently used as a literary premise by science fiction writer Philip José Farmer, as the basis for the Wold Newton family.
- December 28 – Construction of Yonge Street, formerly recognized as the longest street in the world, begins in York, Upper Canada (modern-day Toronto).

=== Undated ===
- The Hudson's Bay Company trading post Fort Edmonton is constructed; the city of Edmonton, Alberta, eventually grows from it.
- The British Royal Navy makes the use of lemon juice mandatory, to prevent scurvy.
- The harvest fails in Munich.
- Daniel McGinnis discovers the supposed Money Pit on Oak Island, Nova Scotia. (according to one story)
- Jim Beam is founded as Old Jake Beam Sour Mash.

=== January–March ===
- January 16 – The first Dutch (and general) elections are held for the National Assembly of the Batavian Republic. (The next Dutch general elections are held in 1888).
- February 1 – The capital of Upper Canada is moved from Newark to York.
- February 9 – The Qianlong Emperor of China abdicates at age 84 to make way for his son, the Jiaqing Emperor.
- February 15 – French Revolutionary Wars: The Invasion of Ceylon (1795) ends when Johan van Angelbeek, the Batavian governor of Ceylon, surrenders Colombo peacefully to British forces.
- February 16 – The Kingdom of Great Britain is granted control of Ceylon by the Dutch.
- February 29 – Ratifications of the Jay Treaty between Great Britain and the United States are officially exchanged, bringing it into effect.
- March 9 – Widow Joséphine de Beauharnais marries General Napoleon Bonaparte.
- March 20 – The U.S. House of Representatives demands that the U.S. State Department supply it with documents relating to the negotiation of the Jay Treaty; President Washington declines the request, citing that only the U.S. Senate has jurisdiction over treaties.
- March 26 – Napoleon Bonaparte arrives at Nice to take command of the Army of Italy (37,000 men and 60 guns), which is scattered in detachments as far as Genoa.
- March 30 – Carl Gauss obtains conditions for the constructibility by ruler and compass of regular polygons, and can announce that the regular 17-gon is constructible by ruler and compasses.

=== April–June ===
- April 2 – The only night of the supposed Shakespearean play Vortigern and Rowena (actually written by William Henry Ireland) ends in the audience's laughter.
- April 12 – War of the First Coalition – Battle of Montenotte: Napoleon Bonaparte gains his first victory as an army commander.
- April 14–15 – War of the First Coalition – Battle of Dego: French troops under Napoleon Bonaparte defeat the Austro-Sardinian forces near Dego. The hamlet changes hands for two days in hard fighting. The battle confirms the vulnerability of dispersed coalition forces. The Austrians lose 670 men killed or wounded, plus 1,087 men captured. The French lose 621 men killed or wounded, and 317 men captured.
- April 16 – War of the First Coalition – Battle of Ceva: French troops (some 8,000 men) under General Pierre Augereau assault the Sardinian defensive positions at Ceva. After fierce fighting, the defensive system gives way under French pressure. The Sardinians are forced to withdraw. The French lose some 600 men killed or wounded.
- April 21 – War of the First Coalition – Battle of Mondovi: Napoleon Bonaparte decisively defeats the army of Piedmont-Sardinia, leaving its capital of Turin defenseless. This convinces Piedmont to sign an armistice and withdraw from the war, turning the war in Italy decisively in France's favor.
- April 26 – The French proclaim the Republic of Alba on the occupied territories. Two days later, King Victor Amadeus III of Sardinia signs the Armistice of Cherasco, in the headquarters of Napoleon. The fortresses of Coni, Tortoni and Alessandria, with all their guns, are given up.
- April 27 – Case of the Lyons Mail: During the night, five highwaymen attack the mail between Paris and Lyon, kill the postmen and steal the funds sent to the armies in Italy.
- April 28 – In an impassioned speech, U.S. Representative Fisher Ames of Massachusetts persuades his fellow members of the House to support the Jay Treaty.
- May 6 – Napoleon Bonaparte forms an advanced guard (3,500 infantry and 1,500 cavalry) under General Claude Dallemagne. He sends this force along the south bank of the Po River, to cross it with boats at Piacenza.
- May 10
  - War of the First Coalition – Battle of Lodi: General Napoleon Bonaparte defeats the Austrian rearguard, in forcing a crossing of the bridge over the Adda River in Italy. The Austrians lose some 2,000 men, 14 guns, and 30 ammunition wagons.
  - Persian Expedition of 1796: Russian troops storm Derbent.
- May 14 – Edward Jenner administers the first smallpox vaccination, in England.
- May 15 – Napoleon's troops take Milan.
- May 20 – The last mock Garrat Elections are held in Surrey, England.
- May 30 - War of the First Coalition - Battle of Borghetto: French troops (28,000 men) under Napoleon Bonaparte force a crossing of the Mincio River and push the Austrian army back towards the Tyrol. The Austrians lose 572 men killed or wounded, while the French lose some 500 men.
- June 1
  - The French-Republican army divisions of the Army of Italy invade the territories of Venice.
  - Tennessee is admitted as the 16th U.S. state.
- June 4 - The Siege of Mantua (1796-1797) begins when Napoleon Bonaparte lays siege to the city of Mantua, Austria's final stronghold in Northern Italy. The siege and Austria's attempts to relieve it will take the majority of the Italian campaign.
- June 6–7 – Ragunda lake in Sweden bursts and drains completely, leaving the Döda fallet dry.
- June 21 – Scottish explorer Mungo Park becomes the first European to reach the Niger River.
- June 23 – Napoleon Bonaparte seizes the Papal States, which become part of the revolutionary Cisalpine Republic. Pope Pius VI signs the Armistice of Bologna, and is forced to contribute (34 million francs).

=== July–September ===
- July 10 – Carl Friedrich Gauss discovers that every positive integer is representable as a sum of at most 3 triangular numbers.
- July 11 – The United States takes possession of Detroit from Great Britain, under the terms of the Jay Treaty.
- July 21 – Mungo Park reaches Ségou, the capital of the Bamana Empire.
- July 22 – Surveyors of the Connecticut Land Company name an area in Ohio Cleveland, after Gen. Moses Cleaveland, the superintendent of the surveying party.
- July 29 – The Habsburg army under Marshal Wurmser advances from the Alps, and captures Rivoli and Verona. The French abandon the east bank of the Mincio River, the outnumbered division (15,000 men) of Masséna retreats towards Lake Garda.
- August 4 – French Revolutionary Wars: Battle of Lonato – The French Army of Italy under Napoleon crushes an Austrian brigade.
- August 5 – French Revolutionary Wars: Battle of Castiglione – The French Army of Italy under Napoleon defeats the Habsburg army (25,000 men) under Marshal Wurmser, who thus fails to break the Siege of Mantua (1796–97), and is forced to retreat north up the Adige Valley.
- August 9 – The Wearmouth Bridge in England, designed by Rowland Burdon in cast iron, opens to traffic. Its span of 72 m (236 ft) makes it the world's longest single-span vehicular bridge extant at this date.
- August 10 – A mob of peasants overtakes the Convent of St. Peter (Bludenz, Austria) and murders Ignaz Anton von Indermauer.
- August 19 – Second Treaty of San Ildefonso: Spain and France form an alliance against Great Britain.
- September 2 – Jewish emancipation in the Batavian Republic (Netherlands).
- September 8 – French Revolutionary Wars: Battle of Bassano – French forces (20,000 men) under Napoleon Bonaparte and André Masséna defeat the Austrians in Veneto. Wurmser retreats towards Vicenza with just 3,500 men of his original 11,000 left to him.
- September 9 – French Revolutionary Wars: Action of 9 September 1796 – A naval engagement between French and British squadrons off Sumatra ends inconclusively.
- September 9 – Grenelle camp affair, a failed uprising by supporters of Gracchus Babeuf against the French Directory
- September 15 – Siege of Mantua: Napoleon Bonaparte fights a pitched battle at La Favorita on the east side of the Mincio River. The Austrians withdraw into the fortress of Mantua, which is crowded with nearly 30,000 men. Within six weeks, 4,000 die from wounds or sickness.
- September 17 – U.S. President George Washington issues his Farewell Address, which warns against partisan politics and foreign entanglements. In addition, he sets a precedent by declining to run for a third term.
- September 28 – Empress Catherine the Great signs an agreement with Great Britain, formally joining Russia to the coalition.

=== October–December ===
- October 19 – French Revolutionary Wars: Battle of Emmendingen – Austrian forces force the French to retreat, but commanding generals on both sides are killed.
- October – Jane Austen begins writing her first draft of Pride and Prejudice, under the title First Impressions (the book will not be published until 1813).
- November 3 – John Adams defeats Thomas Jefferson, in the 1796 U.S. presidential election.
- November 4 – The Treaty of Tripoli (between the United States and Tripoli) is signed at Tripoli (see also 1797).
- November 6
  - Catherine the Great dies, and is succeeded by her son Paul I of Russia. His wife Sophie Marie Dorothea of Württemberg becomes Empress consort.
  - French forces (9,500 men) under Masséna attack the Austrian army at Fontaniva. After a desperate assault he is outnumbered, and forced to retreat to Verona.
- November 12
  - Battle of Caldiero: French forces are defeated by the Austrians at Caldiero, and pushed back to Verona. This marks Napoleon's first defeat, losing nearly 2,000 men and 2 guns.
  - Groton, New Hampshire is incorporated as a town.
- November 17 – Battle of Arcole: French forces under General Napoleon defeat the Austrians at Arcole. After a bold maneuver, he outflanks the Austrian army (24,000 men) under Freiherr József Alvinczi, and cuts off its line of retreat. Alvinczi is forced to take up a defensive position behind the Brenta River.
- December – The British government begins work on a 40-acre (162,000 m²) site at Norman Cross, for the world's first purpose-built prisoner-of-war camp.
- December 7 – The U.S. Electoral College meets to elect John Adams president of the United States.
- December 18 – British Royal Navy ship HMS Courageux is wrecked on the Barbary Coast with the loss of 464 of the 593 onboard.

=== Date unknown ===
- The Spanish government lifts the restrictions against neutrals trading with the colonies, thus acknowledging Spain's inability to supply the colonies with needed goods and markets.
- Robert Burns's version of the Scots poem Auld Lang Syne is first published, in this year's volume of The Scots Musical Museum.
- Annual British iron production reaches 125,000 tons.
- Rizla rolling papers established.

=== January–March ===
- January 3 – The Treaty of Tripoli, a peace treaty between the United States and Ottoman Tripolitania, is signed at Algiers (see also 1796).
- January 7 – The parliament of the Cisalpine Republic adopts the Italian green-white-red tricolour as their official flag (this is considered the birth of the flag of Italy).
- January 13 – Action of 13 January 1797, part of the War of the First Coalition: Two British Royal Navy frigates, HMS Indefatigable and HMS Amazon, drive the French 74-gun ship of the line Droits de l'Homme aground on the coast of Brittany, resulting in over 900 deaths.
- January 14 – War of the First Coalition – Battle of Rivoli: French forces under General Napoleon Bonaparte defeat an Austrian army of 28,000 men, under Feldzeugmeister József Alvinczi, near Rivoli (modern-day Italy), ending Austria's fourth and final attempt to relieve the fortress city of Mantua.
- January 15–16 – War of the First Coalition – Battle of La Favorita: French forces (28,000 men) under Napoleon Bonaparte stop the Austrian push to relieve Mantua. The garrison under Field Marshal Dagobert von Wurmser is deprived of food and reinforcements. The next day, Napoleon orders the city to be surrounded and sends French troops under General Pierre Augereau to blockade the approaches from Legnago.
- January 26 – The Treaty of the Third Partition of Poland is signed in St. Petersburg by the Russian Empire, Austria and the Kingdom of Prussia.
- February 2 – Siege of Mantua: Field marshal Dagobert von Wurmser surrenders the fortress city to the French; only 16,000 men of the garrison are capable of marching out as prisoners of war.
- February 3 – Battle of Faenza: A French corps (9,000 men) under General Claude-Victor Perrin defeats the forces from the Papal States, at Castel Bolognese near Faenza, Italy.
- February 4 – The Riobamba earthquake in Ecuador, estimated magnitude 8.3, causes up to 40,000 casualties.
- February 12 – "Gott erhalte Franz den Kaiser" is first performed, with the music composed in January by Joseph Haydn, and it also becomes the tune of the Deutschlandlied, the German national anthem (Deutschland, Deutschland über alles, later Einigkeit und Recht und Freiheit).
- February 14 – French Revolutionary Wars – Battle of Cape St. Vincent: The British Royal Navy under Admiral Sir John Jervis defeats a larger Spanish fleet off Cape St. Vincent, Portugal.
- February 18 – Invasion of Trinidad: Spanish Governor José María Chacón peacefully surrenders the colony of Trinidad to a British naval force, commanded by Sir Ralph Abercromby.
- February 19 – Treaty of Tolentino: Pope Pius VI signs a peace treaty with Revolutionary France. He is forced to deliver works of art, treasures, territory, the Comtat Venaissin, and 30 million francs.
- February 22 – The last invasion of Britain begins: French forces, under the command of American Colonel William Tate, land near Fishguard, Wales.
- February 25 – William Tate surrenders to the British at Fishguard.
- February 26 – Bank Restriction Act removes the requirement for the Bank of England (the national bank of Great Britain) to convert banknotes into gold – Restriction period lasts until 1821. The Bank of England issues the first one-pound and two-pound notes (pound notes discontinued March 11, 1988).
- March 5 – Protestant missionaries from the London Missionary Society land in Tahiti, from the Duff (celebrated as Missionary Day in French Polynesia).
- March 13 – Médée, an opera by Luigi Cherubini, is premiered in Paris.
- March 16 – Battle of Valvasone: The Austrian army, led by Archduke Charles, fights a rearguard action at the crossing of the Tagliamento River, but is defeated by Napoleon Bonaparte at Valvasone.
- March 21 – Battle of Parramatta: Resistance leader Pemulwuy leads a group of aboriginal warriors, estimated to be at least 100, in an attack on a government farm at Toongabbie in Sydney, Australia.

=== April–June ===
- April 16 – The Spithead and Nore mutinies break out in the British Royal Navy.
- April 17
  - Battle of San Juan: Sir Ralph Abercromby unsuccessfully invades San Juan, Puerto Rico in what will be one of the largest British attacks on Spanish territories in the western hemisphere, and one of the worst defeats of the British Royal Navy for years to come.
  - Veronese Easter: Citizens of Verona, Italy, began an unsuccessful eight-day rebellion against the French occupying forces.
- April 18 – Armistice of Leoben: On behalf of the French Republic, a delegation under Napoleon Bonaparte signs a peace treaty with the Holy Roman Empire at Leoben.
- May 10 – The first ship of the United States Navy, the frigate USS United States, is commissioned.
- May 12 – War of the First Coalition: Napoleon Bonaparte conquers Venice, ending the city and Republic of Venice's 1,100 years of independence. The last doge of Venice, Ludovico Manin, steps down. The Venetian Ghetto is thrown open.
- May 30 – English abolitionist William Wilberforce marries Barbara Ann Spooner about six weeks after their first meeting.
- June 28 – French troops disembark in Corfu, beginning the First period of French rule in the Ionian Islands.
- June 29 – Napoleon Bonaparte decrees the birth of the Cisalpine Republic; he appoints ministers and establishes the first constitution.

=== July–September ===
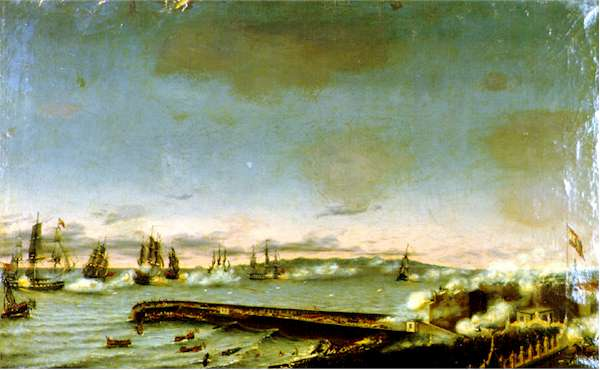
July 24: Battle of Santa Cruz

- July 9 – U.S. Senator William Blount becomes the first federal legislator to be expelled from office, as his fellow Senators vote 25 to 1 to block him from his seat during an investigation against him on charges of criminal conspiracy.
- July 13 – Gual and España conspiracy against Spanish rule in Colonial Venezuela is exposed.
- July 24 – Horatio Nelson is wounded at the Battle of Santa Cruz, losing an arm.
- August 29 – Massacre of Tranent: British troops attack protestors against enforced recruitment into the militia at Tranent, Scotland, killing 11 and injuring 8.
- September 4 – The Coup of 18 Fructidor is carried out in France as three of the five members of The Directory, France's executive council, arrested royalist members of the Council of Five Hundred, the national legislature, and discard the results of the spring elections.
- September 5 – France's new government decrees that citizens who left the country without authorization are subject to the death penalty if they return.
- September 30 – Dominique-Vincent Ramel-Nogaret, French finance minister, repudiates two thirds of France's debt.

=== October–December ===
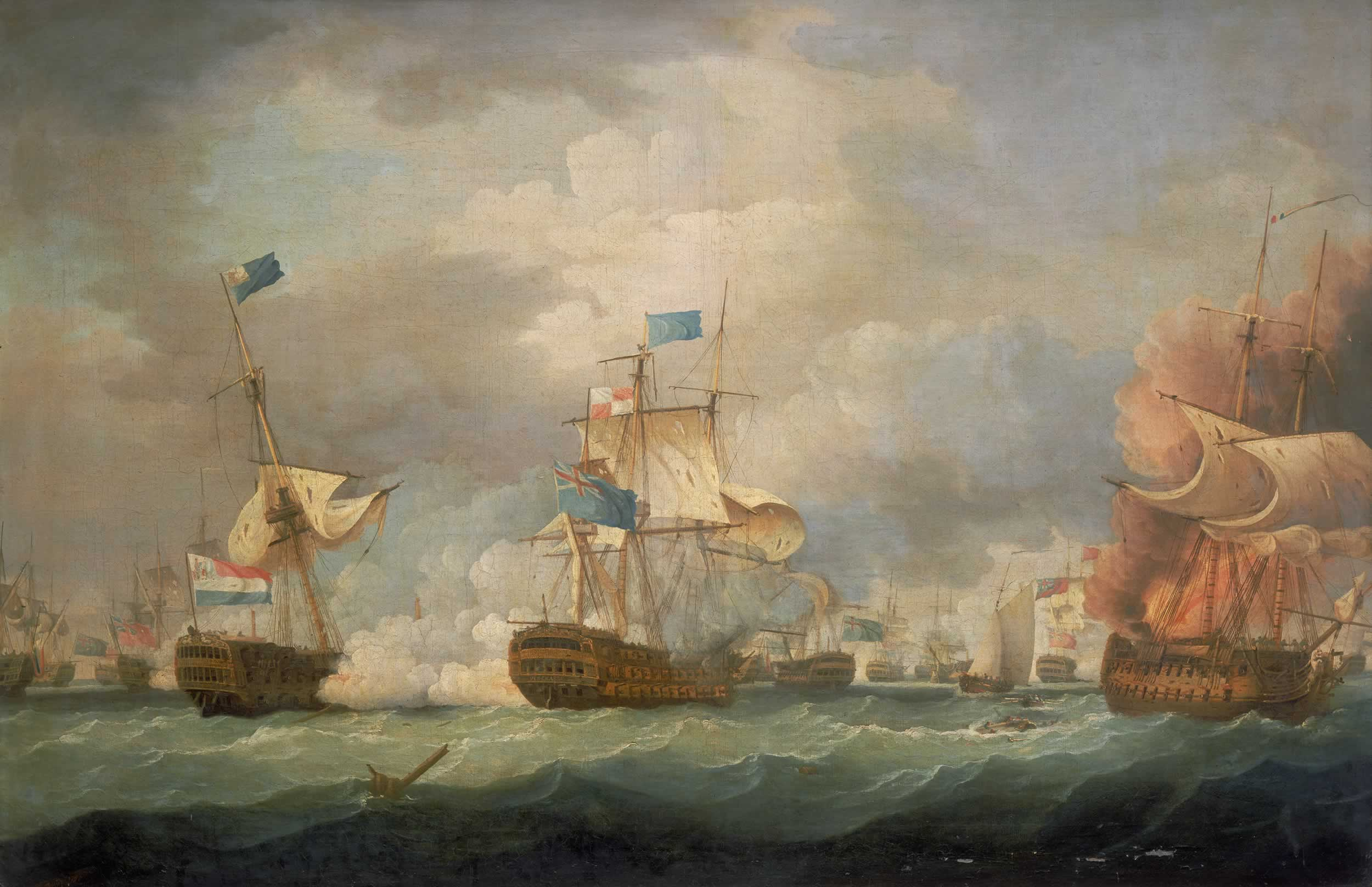
October 11: Battle of Camperdown

- October 11 – Battle of Camperdown: the British Royal Navy defeats the fleet of the Batavian Republic off the coast of Holland.
- October 17 – The Treaty of Campo Formio ends the War of the First Coalition.
- October 18 – The XYZ Affair inflames tensions between France and the United States when American negotiators Charles Cotesworth Pinckney, John Marshall, and Elbridge Gerry meet with French government representatives Jean-Conrad Hottinguer, Pierre Bellamy and Lucien Hauteval and are told that a treaty between France and the U.S. will require payment of a bribe to France's Foreign Minister Charles Talleyrand and a large loan of American cash to France. Pinckney tells people later that his response was "No, no, not a sixpence!"; Hottinguer, Bellamy and Hauteval are referred to, respectively, as "X", "Y" and "Z" in U.S. government reports on the failed negotiations.
- October 21 – In Boston Harbor, the 44-gun United States Navy frigate USS Constitution is launched to fight Barbary pirates off the coast of Tripoli; the ship will remain in commission in the 21st century.
- October 22 – André-Jacques Garnerin makes the first parachute descent, at Parc Monceau, Paris; he uses a silk parachute to descend approximately 3,000 feet (910 m) from a hot air balloon.
- November – 1797 Rugby School rebellion: The students at Rugby School in England rebel against the headmaster, Henry Ingles, after he decrees that the damage to a tradesman's windows should be paid for by the students.
- November 16
  - The Prussian heir apparent, Frederick William, becomes King of Prussia as Fredrick William III.
  - (or November 23?) – British Royal Navy frigate HMS Tribune (1796) is wrecked on the approaches to Halifax, Nova Scotia; of the 240 on board, all but 12 are lost.

=== Undated ===
- The secret Lautaro Lodge as the Logia de los Caballeros Racionales ("Lodge of Rational Knights") is founded, perhaps in Cádiz; membership will include many leaders of the Spanish American wars of independence such as Francisco de Miranda, Bernardo O'Higgins and José de San Martín.
- Shinyukan Cram School (進修館) founded by Masataka Okudaira (奥平昌孝) in Nakatsu, Buzen Province (now Oita Prefecture), Kyushu Island, as predecessor of Keio-Gijyuku University in Japan.
- Joseph-Louis Lagrange publishes his treatise on differential calculus, entitled Théorie des fonctions analytiques.

=== January–June ===
- January – Eli Whitney contracts with the U.S. federal government for 10,000 muskets, which he produces with interchangeable parts.
- January 4 – Constantine Hangerli enters Bucharest, as Prince of Wallachia.
- January 22 – A coup d'état is staged in the Netherlands (Batavian Republic). Unitarian Democrat Pieter Vreede ends the power of the parliament (with a conservative-moderate majority).
- February 10 – The Pope is taken captive, and the Papacy is removed from power, by French General Louis-Alexandre Berthier.
- February 15 – U.S. Representative Roger Griswold (Fed-CT) beats Congressman Matthew Lyon (Dem-Rep-VT) with a cane, after the House declines to censure Lyon for earlier spitting in Griswold's face; the House declines to discipline either man.
- March – the Irish Rebellion of 1798 begins when the Irish Militia arrest the leadership of the Society of United Irishmen, a group unique amongst Irish republican and nationalist movements in that it unifies Catholics and Protestants (Anglican, Presbyterian, Methodist, Baptist and others) around republican ideals. This month, Lord Castlereagh is appointed Acting Chief Secretary for Ireland and on March 30 martial law is proclaimed here. The first battles in the rebellion are fought on May 24, and it continues through September, but the rebels receive much less than the expected support from France, which sends only 1,100 men.
- March 5 – French troops enter Bern.
- March 7 – French forces invade the Papal States and establish the Roman Republic.
- April 7 – The Mississippi Territory is organized by the United States, from territory ceded by Georgia and South Carolina; later it is twice expanded, to include disputed territory claimed by both the U.S. and Spain (which acquired territory in trade with Great Britain).
- April 12 – The Helvetic Republic, a French client republic, is proclaimed following the collapse of the Old Swiss Confederacy after the French invasion; Aarau becomes the republic's temporary capital.
- April 26 – France annexes Geneva.
- April 30 – The United States Department of the Navy is established as a cabinet-level department. Benjamin Stoddert, a civilian businessman, is appointed as the first Navy Secretary by President Adams.
- May 7 – French Revolutionary Wars: A French force attempting to dislodge a small British garrison on the Îles Saint-Marcouf is repulsed with heavy losses.
- May 9 – Napoleon sets off for Toulon, sailing aboard Vice-Admiral Brueys's flagship L'Orient; his squadron is part of a larger fleet of over 300 vessels, carrying almost 37,000 troops.
- May 27 – Pitt–Tierney duel takes place on Putney Heath. British Prime Minister William Pitt the Younger fights a duel against opposition politician George Tierney
- June 12
  - French invasion of Malta: French forces under Napoleon Bonaparte capture the island fortress of Malta on the way to Egypt.
  - A moderate coup d'état in the Netherlands (Batavian Republic) deposes Pieter Vreede.
- June 13 – Mission San Luis Rey de Francia is founded in California.
- June 18 – The first of the four Alien and Sedition Acts, the Naturalization Act of 1798, is signed into law by U.S. President Adams, requiring immigrants to wait 14 years rather than five years to become naturalized citizens of the United States. On June 25, another law is signed authorizing the imprisonment and deportation of any non-citizens deemed to be dangerous.

=== July–December ===
- July 1 – Egyptian Campaign: Napoleon Bonaparte disembarks his French army in Marabout Bay near Alexandria.
- July 7
  - Quasi-War: The United States Congress rescinds treaties with France, sparking the war.
  - In the action of USS Delaware vs La Croyable, the newly-formed United States Navy makes its first capture.
- July 11 – The United States Marine Corps is re-established under its present name.
- July 12 – Battle of Shubra Khit: French troops defeat the Mamelukes, during Napoleon's march from Alexandria to take Cairo.
- July 14 – The fourth of the Alien and Sedition Acts, the Sedition Act of 1798 is signed into law, making it a federal crime to write, publish, or utter false or malicious statements about the United States government.
- July 16 – The Relief of Sick and Disabled Seamen Act is signed into law, creating the Marine Hospital Service, the forerunner to the current United States Public Health Service Commissioned Corps.
- July 21 – Battle of the Pyramids: Napoleon Bonaparte defeats the Ottoman forces near the Pyramids. French forces claim control over Egypt's political center.
- July 24 – Napoleon Bonaparte enters Cairo. The occupation turns the campaign into an experiment in rule, science, and military control.
- July 31 – A second round of elections are held in the Netherlands (Batavian Republic); no general elections this time.
- August 1 – Battle of the Nile (near Abu Qir): Lord Nelson defeats the French navy under Admiral Brueys. 11 of the 13 French battleships are captured or destroyed, including the flagship Orient whose magazine explodes; Nelson himself is wounded in the head.
- August 22 – French troops land at Kilcummin in County Mayo to assist the Irish Rebellion.
- September – Charles Brockden Brown publishes the first significant American novel, the Gothic fiction Wieland: or, The Transformation; an American Tale.
- September 5 – Conscription is made mandatory in France by the Jourdan Law.
- September 10
  - The Piedmontese Republic is declared in the territory of Piedmont.
  - Battle of St. George's Caye: Off the coast of British Honduras (modern-day Belize), a group of European settlers and Africans defeats a Spanish force sent from Mexico to drive them out.
- September 18 – Lyrical Ballads is published anonymously by Samuel Taylor Coleridge and William Wordsworth, inaugurating the English Romantic movement in literature.
- September 23 – Battle of Killala: in the last land battle of the Irish Rebellion of 1798, British troops defeat the remaining rebel Irish and French forces at Killala.
- October 2 – The Cherokee nation signs a treaty with the United States allowing free passage through Cherokee lands in Tennessee through the Cumberland Gap through the Appalachian Mountains from Virginia into Kentucky.
- October 7 – U.S. Representative Matthew Lyon of Vermont becomes the first member of Congress to be put on trial for violating the new Sedition Act of 1798.
- October 12
  - Battle of Tory Island: A British Royal Navy squadron, under Sir John Borlase Warren, prevents French Republican ships, commanded by Jean-Baptiste-François Bompart, from landing reinforcements for the Society of United Irishmen on the County Donegal coast; Irish leader Wolfe Tone is captured and later dies of his wounds. This ends the Irish Rebellion of 1798.
  - Peasants War against the French occupiers of the Southern Netherlands begins in Overmere.
- October 21–22 – Revolt of Cairo: Napoleon Bonaparte suppresses a revolt in Cairo. French occupation survives but becomes more dependent on force and administration.
- October 22 – Capitulation of the French garrison at Hyderabad to East India Company troops under James Kirkpatrick, British Resident.
- October 23 – The Ottoman–Albanian forces of Ali Pasha of Janina defeat the French and capture the town of Preveza in the Battle of Nicopolis.
- October 25 – The Ottoman–Albanian forces of Ali Pasha of Janina capture Butrint from the French after a week-long siege.
- November 4 – The Russo-Ottoman siege of Corfu, held by the French, begins.
- November 8 – British whaler John Fearn becomes the first European to land on Nauru.
- November 28 – Trade between the United States and modern-day Uruguay begins when John Leamy's frigate John arrives in Montevideo.
- December 5 – Peasants War in the Southern Netherlands: The revolt is crushed in Hasselt; during the uprising it is estimated that 5,000 to 10,000 people have been killed.
- December 6 – General Joubert of the Piedmontese Republic occupies the Sardinian capital of Turin.

=== Date unknown ===
- Edward Jenner publishes An Inquiry into the Causes and Effects of the Variolæ Vaccinæ, describing the smallpox vaccine, in London.
- Thomas Malthus publishes An Essay on the Principle of Population (anonymously) in London.
- Nathan Mayer Rothschild moves from Frankfurt in the Holy Roman Empire to England, settling up in business as a textile trader and financier in Manchester.
- Alois Senefelder invents lithography.
- The first census in Brazil counts 2 million blacks in a total population of 3.25 million.
- The Ayrshire (Earl of Carrick's Own) Yeomanry, a British Army Yeomanry Cavalry Regiment, formed by The Earl of Cassillis at Culzean Castle, Ayrshire in 1794, is adopted onto the British Army List.
- The platypus is first discovered by Europeans.

=== January–March ===
- January 9 – British Prime Minister William Pitt the Younger introduces an income tax of two shillings to the pound, to raise funds for Great Britain's effort in the French Revolutionary Wars.
- January 17 – Maltese patriot Dun Mikiel Xerri, along with a number of other patriots, is executed.
- January 21 – The Parthenopean Republic is established in Naples by French General Jean Étienne Championnet; King Ferdinand I of the Two Sicilies flees.
- January 27 – French Revolutionary Wars: Macau Incident – French and Spanish warships encounter a British Royal Navy escort squadron in the Wanshan Archipelago of China inconclusively.
- February 7 – The Jiaqing Emperor of China comes into his full powers on the death of his father, the Qianlong Emperor. He prosecutes corrupt court official Heshen and issues a decree prohibiting the import of opium to China.
- February 9 – Quasi-War: In the single-ship action of USS Constellation vs L'Insurgente in the Caribbean, the American ship is the victor.
- February 28 – French Revolutionary Wars: Action of 28 February 1799 – British Royal Navy frigate HMS Sybille defeats the French frigate Forte off the mouth of the Hooghly River in the Bay of Bengal, but both captains are killed.
- March 1 – Federalist James Ross becomes President pro tempore of the United States Senate.
- March 4 – The Russo-Ottoman Siege of Corfu (1798–1799) ends with the surrender of the French garrison, bringing an end to the first period of French rule in the Ionian Islands (1797–1799).
- March 7 – War of the Second Coalition: Siege of Jaffa – Napoleon captures Jaffa in Palestine from the Ottomans and his troops proceed to kill more than 2,000 Albanian captives.
- March 14 – The public premiere of Haydn’s oratorio The Creation takes place at the Burgtheater in Vienna.
- March 21 – War of the Second Coalition: Victory of Archduke Charles and the Austrian army over the French army of Jean-Baptiste Jourdan at the Battle of Ostrach.
- March 23 – War of the Second Coalition: Victory of Franjo Jelačić and the Austrian army over the French army of André Masséna at the Battle of Feldkirch.
- March 25 – War of the Second Coalition: Victory of Archduke Charles and the Austrian army over the French army of Jean-Baptiste Jourdan at the Battle of Stockach (1799), a key crossroads at the western end of Lake Constance.
- March 29 – New York passes a law aimed at gradually abolishing slavery in the state.

=== April–June ===
- April 16 – French Revolutionary Wars: At the Battle of Mount Tabor severely outnumbered French forces repulse an Ottoman attack.
- April 27 – French Revolutionary Wars: The Battle of Cassano takes place outside of Milan, as Russian and Austrian troops commanded by General Alexander Suvorov rout the French Army under the command of General Jean Moreau.
- April 28 – Two French diplomats to the Second Congress of Rastatt are killed and another badly injured by Austrian cavalry, as they tried to leave the town. An inquiry was held, which blamed French emigres.
- May 4 – Battle of Seringapatam: Tipu Sultan is defeated and killed by the British, ending the captivity of Mangalorean Catholics at Seringapatam ends and concluding the Fourth Anglo-Mysore War.
- May 21 – The Siege of Acre ends after two months; Napoleon's attempt to widen his Middle Eastern campaign into Syria is frustrated by Ottoman forces, and he withdraws to Egypt.
- May 27 – War of the Second Coalition: Battle of Winterthur – Habsburg forces secure control of north-east Switzerland from the French Army of the Danube.
- June 7 – War of the Second Coalition: First Battle of Zurich – Four days of fighting ends in victory for Archduke Charles and the Austrian army over the French army under André Masséna.
- June 13 – Ferdinand I of the Two Sicilies is restored to his kingdom following the collapse of the Parthenopean Republic.
- June 17 – War of the Second Coalition: Battle of the Trebbia – The beginning of the battle that marked the debacle of Étienne Macdonald's French army. Suvorov scores a comprehensive victory.
- June 18 – French Revolutionary Wars: Action of 18 June 1799 – A French frigate squadron, under Rear-admiral Perrée, is captured by the British fleet under Lord Keith, off Toulon.

=== July–September ===
- July 7 – Ranjit Singh's men take their positions outside Lahore.
- July 12 – Ranjit Singh captures Lahore from the Bhangi Misl, a key step in establishing the Sikh Empire, and becoming Maharaja of the Punjab.
- July 15 – In the Egyptian port city of Rosetta, French Captain Pierre Bouchard finds the Rosetta Stone.
- July 25 – Battle of Abukir: French forces under Napoleon Bonaparte defeat 20,000 Ottoman Mamluk troops under Mustafa Pasha at Abukir. The French suffer only 220 dead and 600 wounded while the Ottoman losses are enormous: 2,000 dead on the battlefield, 11,000 men drowned, 5,000 prisoners of war. Napoleon captures 100 Ottoman banners, 32 guns, 400 horses and three Pashas' Bunchuks (ceremonial flags issued to Pasha).
- August 15 – War of the Second Coalition: Battle of Novi – the defeat of Barthélemy Joubert's army by Suvorov's Austrian–Russian troops.
- August 23 – Napoleon Bonaparte leaves the command of the French army (some 10,000 men) to General Jean-Baptiste Kléber. He secretly embarks on the frigate Muiron in a small French flotilla – with Alexandre Berthier, Joachim Murat and Jean Lannes – and several of his servants to France. Kléber reads a proclamation to the troops: "My soldiers, extraordinary circumstances have persuaded me to return, for the benefit of France."
- August 27 – War of the Second Coalition: Anglo-Russian invasion of Holland – Britain and Russia send an expedition to the Batavian Republic.
- August 29 – Pope Pius VI, at this time the longest-reigning Pontiff of the Roman Catholic Church, dies as a prisoner of war in the citadel of the French city of Valence, after 24½ years of rule.
- August 30 – Anglo-Russian invasion of Holland: Vlieter Incident – A squadron of the Batavian Republic's navy, commanded by Rear-Admiral Samuel Story, surrenders to the British Royal Navy, under Sir Ralph Abercromby and Admiral Sir Charles Mitchell, near Wieringen, without joining action.
- September 10 – Anglo-Russian invasion of Holland: Battle of Krabbendam – The Russo-British expedition force defends its initial gains from attacks by Franco-Dutch forces.
- September 18 – War of the Second Coalition: Battle of Mannheim – Victory of Archduke Charles and the Austrian army over a French force under Jacques Léonard Muller
- September 19 – Anglo-Russian invasion of Holland: Battle of Bergen – Franco-Dutch forces hold their ground against the Russo-British expedition force.
- September 23 – Frederick North, 5th Earl of Guilford, the Governor of British Ceylon (modern-day Sri Lanka), issues a proclamation declaring that the laws of the Netherlands for the conquered Dutch Ceylon shall be enforced until superseded by new laws.
- September 29 – The Second Roman Republic, a puppet state formed by the French Army after they dissolve the Papal States and the occupation of Rome, is dissolved 19 months after its creation on February 15, 1798.
- September 30 – Suvorov's Swiss campaign: Battle of Muottental – the rout of Masséna's French troops by Suvorov's army.

=== October–December ===
- October 2 – Anglo-Russian invasion of Holland: Battle of Alkmaar – The Russo-British expedition force wins a small tactical victory over the Franco-Dutch forces.
- October 6 – Anglo-Russian invasion of Holland: Battle of Castricum – Franco-Dutch forces defeat the Russo-British expedition force.
- October 9 – HMS Lutine (a famous treasure wreck) is sunk in the West Frisian Islands.
- October 12 – Jeanne Geneviève Labrosse becomes the first woman to jump from a balloon with a parachute, from an altitude of 900 metres (3,000 ft) over France.
- October 16 – War of the Second Coalition: Action of 16 October 1799 – A Spanish treasure convoy worth more than £54,000,000 is captured by the British Royal Navy off Vigo.
- October 18 – Anglo-Russian invasion of Holland: Anglo-Russian expedition forces surrender in North Holland.
- November 5 – HMS Sceptre is driven ashore and wrecked in a storm in Table Bay, South Africa, with the loss of 349 and 41 survivors.
- November 9 – Coup of 18 Brumaire: Napoleon overthrows the French Directory in a coup d'état, which ends the French Revolution.
- November 10 (19 Brumaire) – A remnant of the Council of Ancients in France abolishes the Constitution of the Year III, and ordains the French Consulate with Napoleon as First Consul, with the Constitution of the Year VIII.
- November 30 – 1799–1800 Papal conclave opens in Venice at San Giorgio Monastery.
- December 3 – War of the Second Coalition: Battle of Wiesloch: Austrian Lieutenant Field Marshal Anton Sztáray defeats the French at Wiesloch.
- December 10 – France adopts the metre as its official unit of length.
- December 14 – George Washington, first President of the United States, dies at Mount Vernon, Virginia, aged 67.
- December 31 – The Dutch East India Company's charter is allowed to expire by the Batavian Republic.

=== Date unknown ===
- The Place Royale in Paris is renamed Place des Vosges, when the Department of Vosges becomes the first to pay new Revolutionary taxes.
- Eli Whitney, holding a 1798 United States government contract for the manufacture of muskets, is introduced by Oliver Wolcott Jr. to the concept of interchangeable parts, an origin of the American system of manufacturing.
- Conrad John Reed, 12, finds what he describes as a "heavy yellow rock" along Little Meadow Creek in Cabarrus County, North Carolina, and makes it a doorstop in his home. Conrad's father John Reed learns that the rock is actually gold in 1802, initiating the first gold rush in the United States.
- The assassination of the 14th Tu'i Kanokupolu, Tukuʻaho, Tonga begins half a century of civil war in Tonga.
- The Nawab (provincial governor) of Oudh in northern India sends to George III of Great Britain the Padshah Nama, an official history of the reign of Shah Jahan.
- William Cockerill begins building cotton-spinning machinery in Belgium.
- The small town of Tignish, Prince Edward Island, Canada is founded.

1790s also saw the beginning of the decline of Qing Dynasty.

== Significant people ==
- President George Washington (United States)
- President John Adams (United States)
- Catherine the Great (Russia)
- Paul I of Russia
- Frederick William II of Prussia
- Frederick William III (Prussia)
- Louis XVI (France)
- Maximilien Robespierre (France)
- Napoleon (France)
- George III (United Kingdom)
- Prime Minister William Pitt the Younger (United Kingdom)
- Charles IV of Spain
- Leopold II, Holy Roman Emperor
- Francis II, Holy Roman Emperor
- Qianlong Emperor
- Jiaqing Emperor
- Pope Pius VI

== Births ==
1790

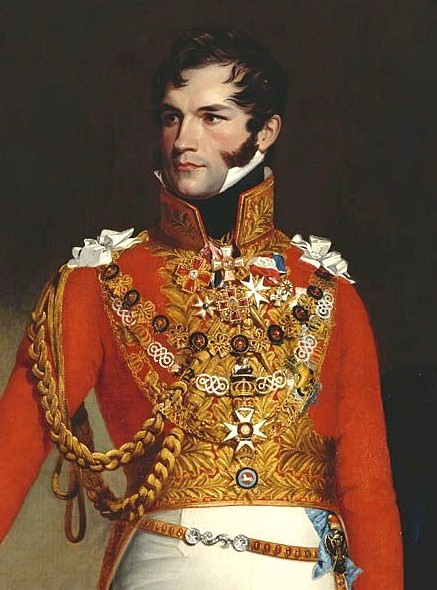
Leopold I of Belgium

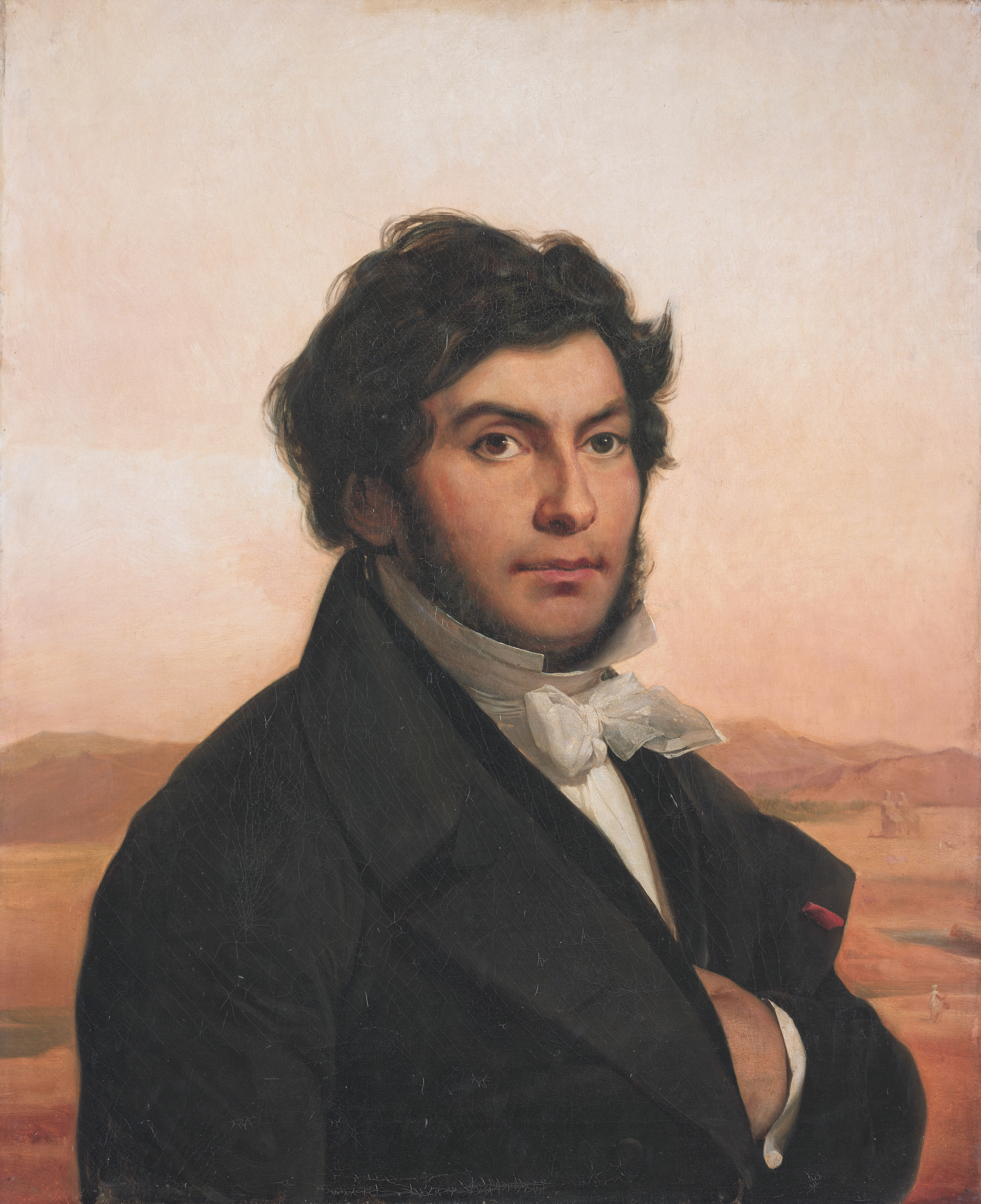
Jean-François Champollion

- January 5 – Melchor Múzquiz, 5th President of Mexico (d. 1844)
- January 18 – Qi Shan, Manchu Qing official (d. 1854)
- January 27 – Juan Álvarez, interim president of Mexico, 1855 (d. 1867)
- February 4 – John Bachman, American minister, social activist and naturalist (d. 1874)
- March 3 – John Austin, English jurist (d. 1859)
- March 29 – John Tyler, tenth President of the United States (d. 1862)
- April 21 – Manuel Blanco Encalada, Spanish-Chilean admiral and politician, 1st President of Chile (d. 1876)
- May 20 – Micajah Thomas Hawkins, American politician (d. 1858)
- May 23 – Jules Dumont d'Urville, French explorer (d. 1842)
- June 1 – Ferdinand Raimund, Austrian playwright (d. 1836)
- June 13 – José Antonio Páez, 19th President of Venezuela (d. 1873)
- June 24 – Helena Ekblom, Swedish preacher (d. 1859)
- July 13 – Anna Sofia Sevelin, Swedish opera singer (d. 1871)
- September 6 – John Green Crosse, English surgeon (d. 1850)
- October 14 – Thursday October Christian I, Pitcairn Islander and son of Fletcher Christian (d. 1831)
- October 21 – Alphonse de Lamartine, French poet and politician
- November 17 – August Ferdinand Möbius, German mathematician, astronomer (d. 1868)
- November 21 – Edmund Lyons, 1st Baron Lyons, British admiral (d. 1858)
- December 8
  - Richard Carlile, English social reformer, press advocate (d. 1843)
  - Friederike Lienig, Latvian entomologist (d. 1855)
  - August Meineke, German Classical scholar (d. 1870)
- December 16 – Leopold I of Belgium (d. 1865)
- December 19 – William Edward Parry, English Arctic explorer (d. 1855)
- December 23 – Jean-François Champollion, French Egyptologist (d. 1832)
- December 31 – Antonie Adamberger, Austrian stage actress (d. 1867)
- date unknown
  - Lone Horn, Miniconjou chief (d. 1875)
  - James Moore Wayne, American politician, Associate Justice of the Supreme Court of the United States (d. 1867)
  - Mohammad Ibrahim Zauq, Urdu poet (d. 1854)

1791

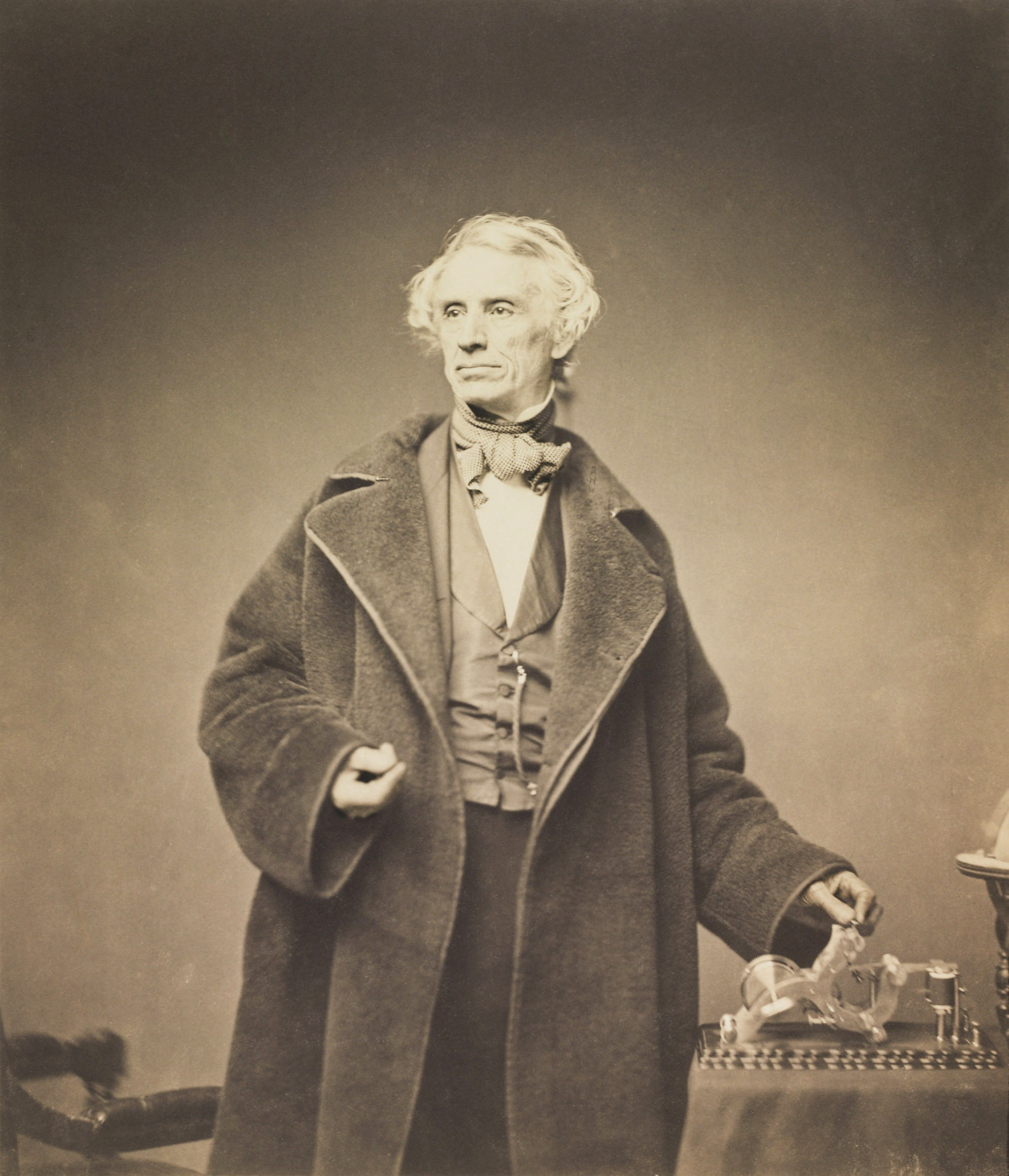
Samuel Morse

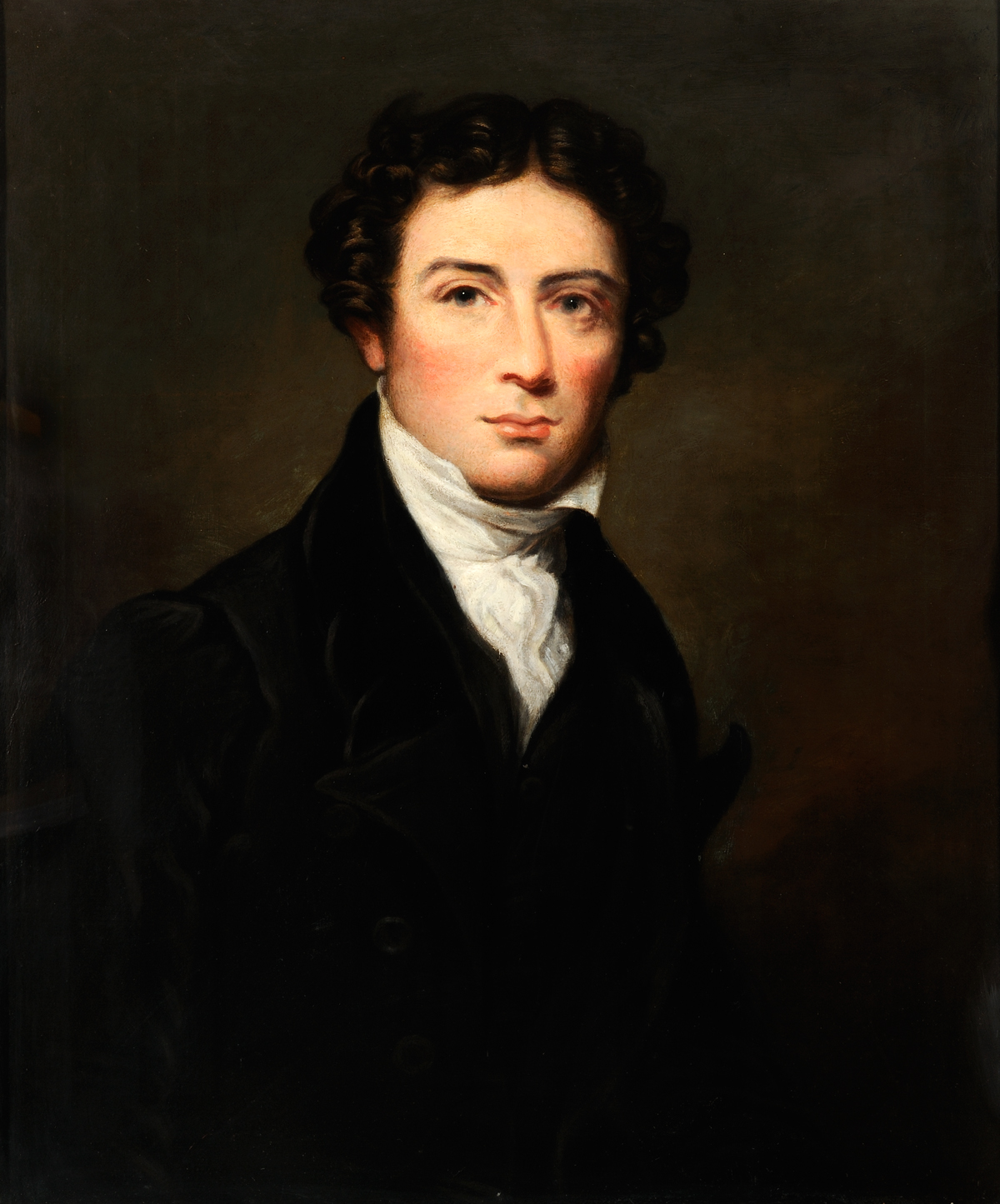
Michael Faraday

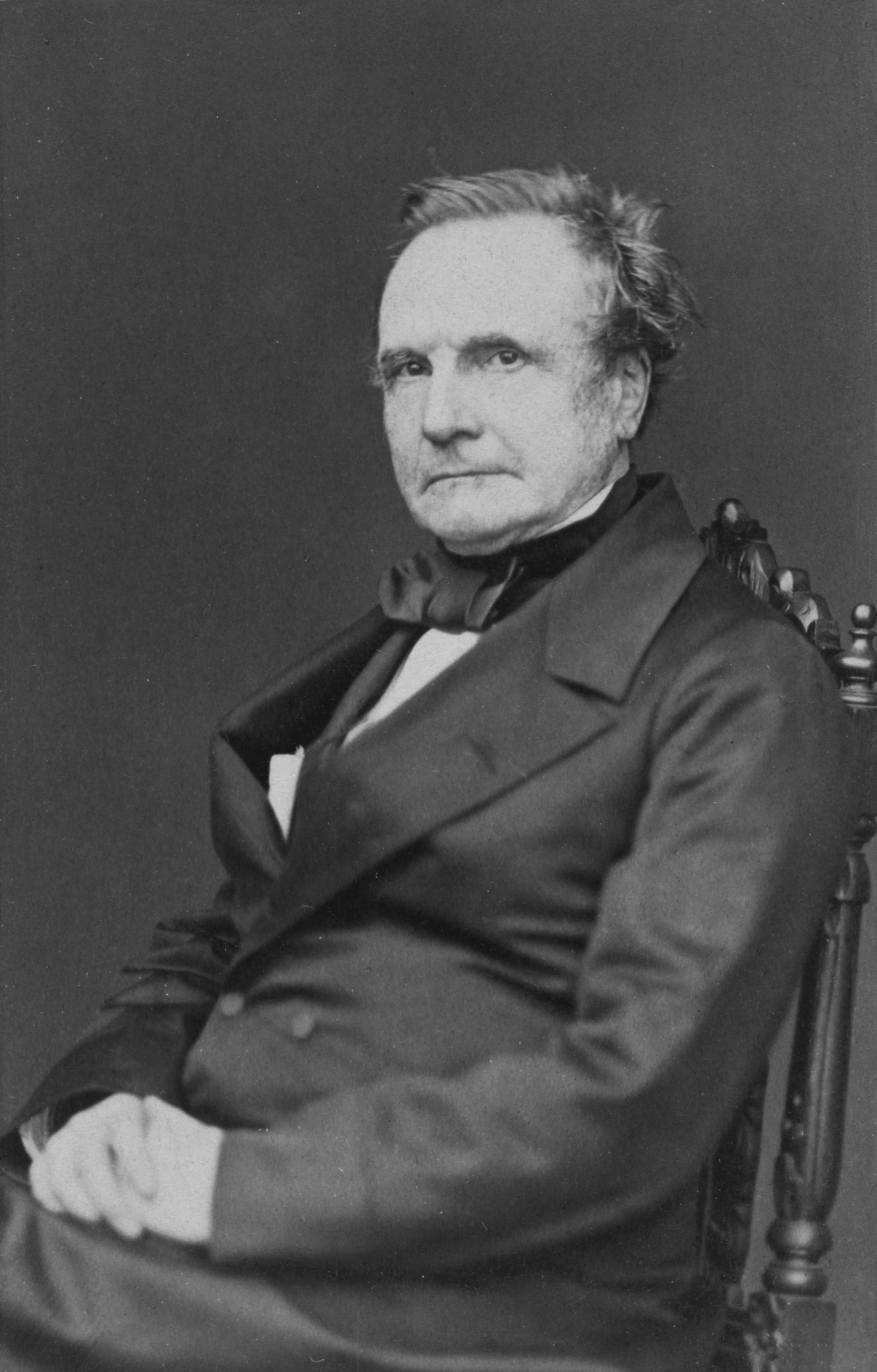
Charles Babbage

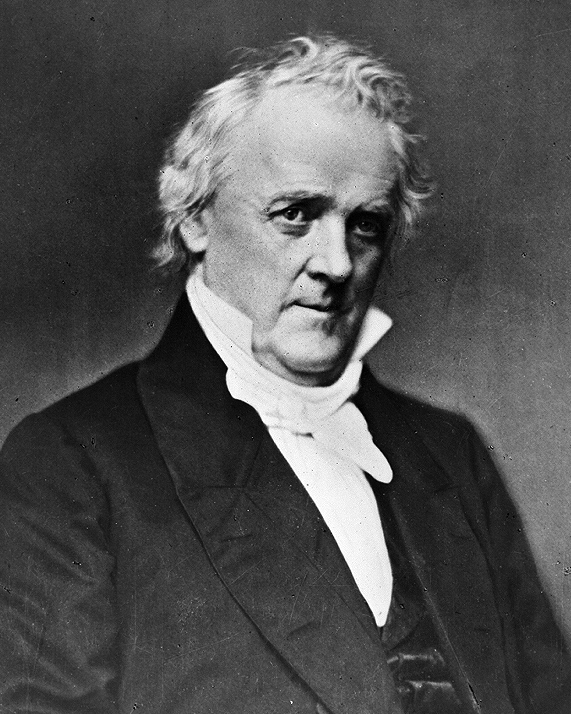
James Buchanan

- January 15 – Franz Grillparzer, Austrian writer (d. 1872)
- January 28 – Ferdinand Hérold, French composer (d. 1833)
- February 12 – Peter Cooper, American industrialist, inventor and philanthropist (d. 1883)
- February 15 – Friedrich Ludwig Weidig, German Protestant theologian, pastor and radical (suicide 1837)
- February 21
  - Carl Czerny, Austrian composer (d. 1857)
  - John Mercer, English chemist, industrialist (d. 1866)
- March 20 – Marie Ellenrieder, German painter (d. 1863)
- March 31 – Franciszek Mirecki, Polish composer, conductor and teacher (d. 1862)
- April 3 – Anne Lister, English landowner, diarist, mountaineer and traveller, "the first modern lesbian" (d. 1840)
- April 23 – James Buchanan, American lawyer, politician, and 15th President of the United States. (d. 1868)
- April 27 – Samuel Morse, American inventor (d. 1872)
- June 1 – John Nelson, American lawyer (d. 1860)
- June 30 – Félix Savart, French physicist (d. 1841)
- July 26 – Franz Xaver Wolfgang Mozart, Austrian composer, pianist (d. 1844)
- September 5 – Giacomo Meyerbeer, German composer (d. 1864)
- September 21 – István Széchenyi, Hungarian politician, writer (d. 1860)
- September 22 – Michael Faraday, English scientist (d. 1867)
- September 23
  - Johann Franz Encke, German astronomer (d. 1865)
  - Theodor Körner, German author, soldier (d. 1813)
- September 26 – Théodore Géricault, French painter (d. 1824)
- October 29 – John Elliotson, British physician (d. 1868)
- November 11 – Josef Munzinger, member of the Swiss Federal Council (d. 1855)
- December 7 – Ferenc Novák, Hungarian Slovene song collector and priest (d. 1836)
- December 26 – Charles Babbage, British mathematician, inventor (d. 1871)
- approximate date – Enriqueta Favez, Swiss-born physician, surgeon (d. 1856)

1792

=== January–June ===
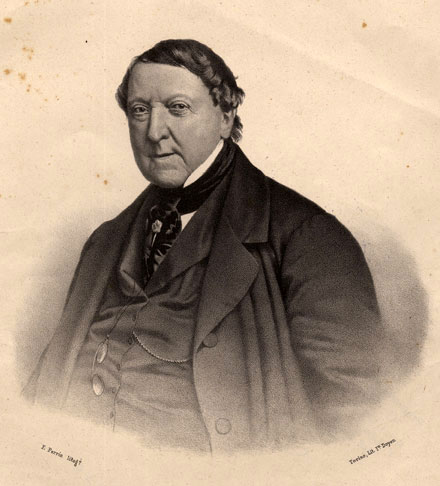
Gioachino Rossini

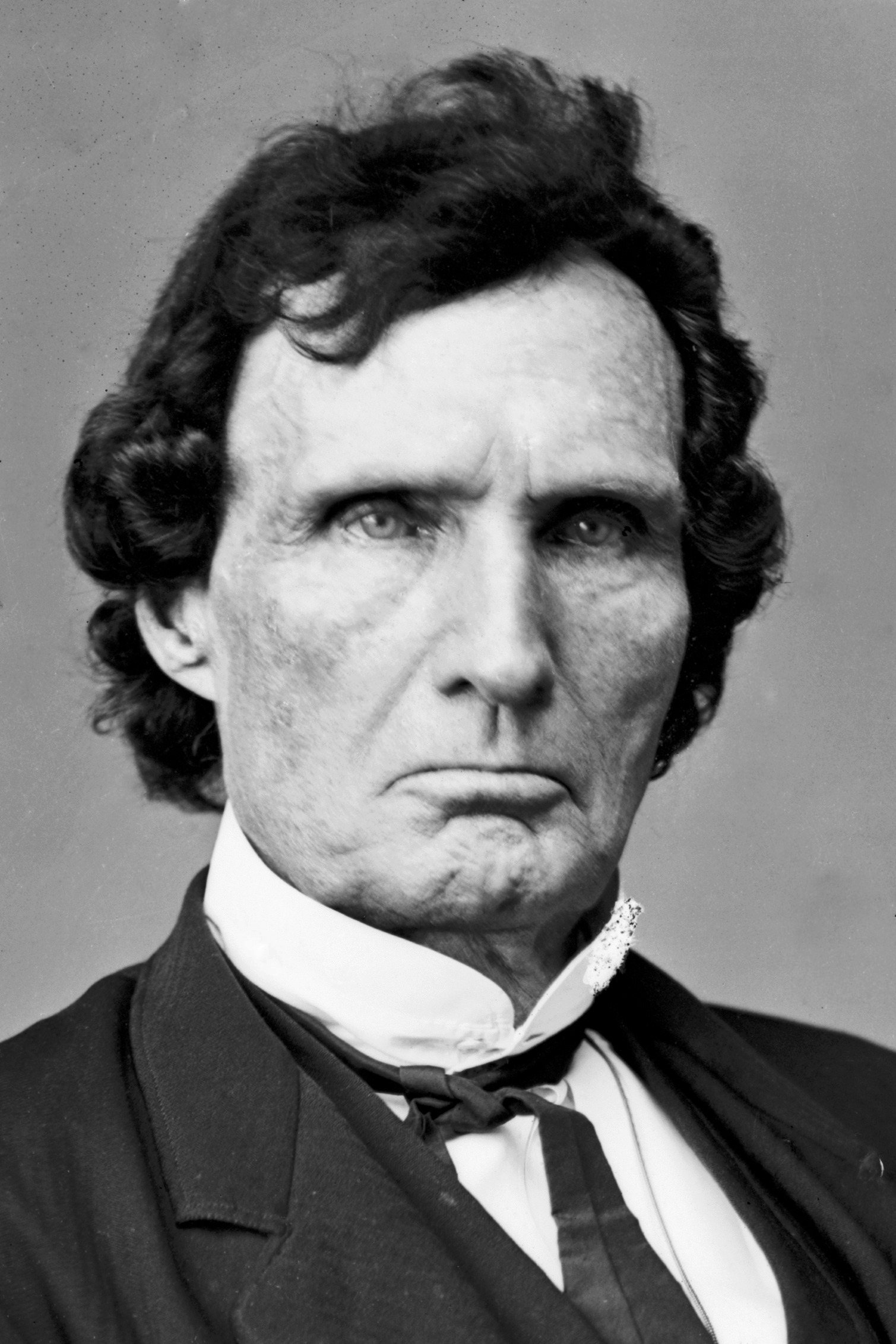
Thaddeus Stevens

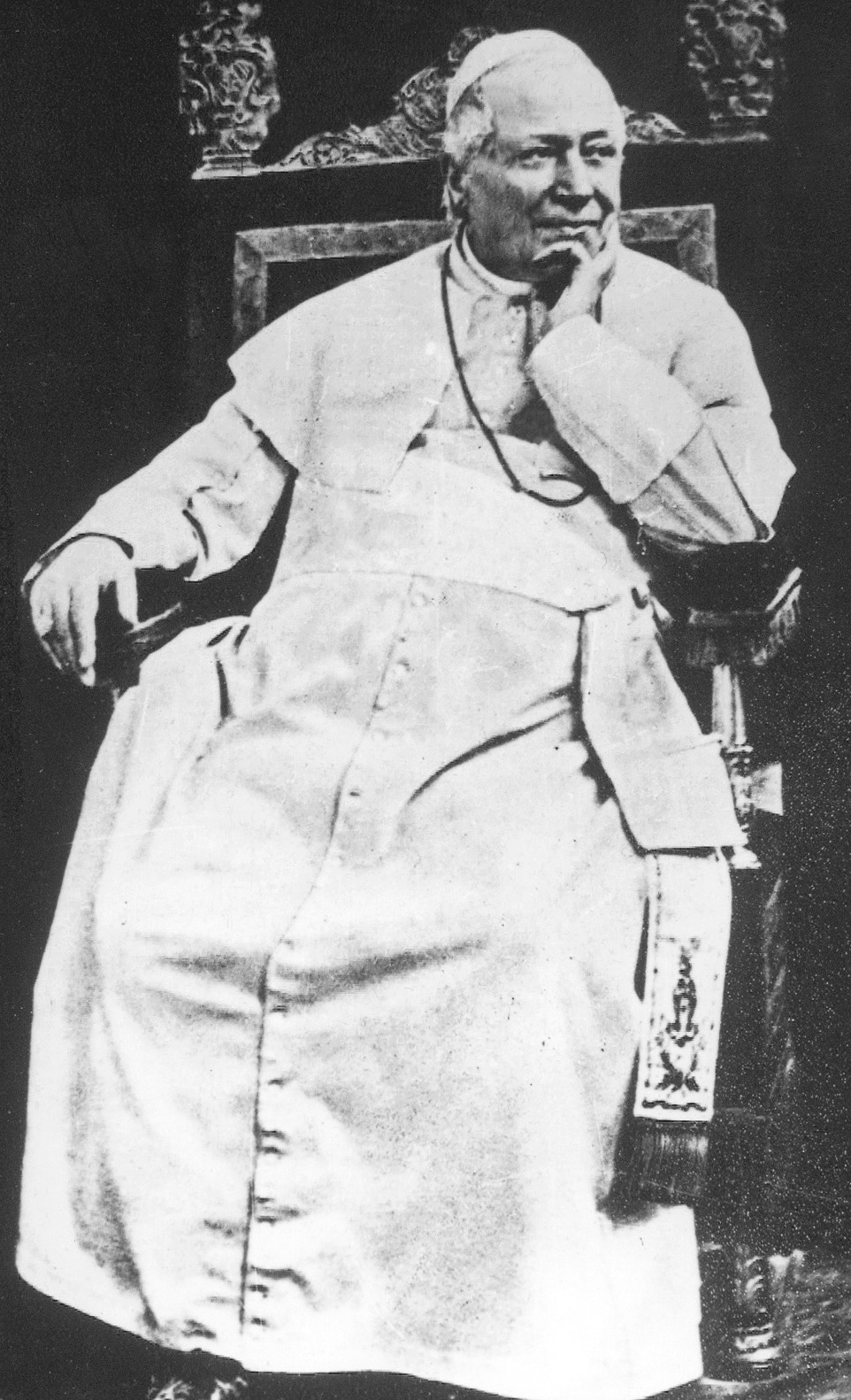
Pope Pius IX

- January 12 – Johann Arfvedson, Swedish chemist (d. 1841)
- February 17 – Karl Ernst von Baer, German naturalist (d. 1876)
- February 29 – Gioachino Rossini, Italian composer (d. 1868)
- March 3 – Johann Karl Ludwig Gieseler, German church historian (d. 1854)
- March 4
  - Isaac Lea, American conchologist, geologist and publisher (d. 1886)
  - Samuel Slocum, American inventor (d. 1861)
- March 7 – John Herschel, English mathematician and astronomer (d. 1871)
- April 1 – Karl Gottlob Zumpt, German classical scholar (d. 1849)
- April 2 – Francisco de Paula Santander, President of Colombia (d. 1840)
- April 4 – Thaddeus Stevens, American politician (d. 1868)
- April 23 – Thomas Romney Robinson, Irish astronomer and physicist (d. 1882)
- April 25 – John Keble, English churchman and poet (d. 1866)
- May 10 – Willie Person Mangum, American politician (d. 1861)
- May 13 – Pope Pius IX (b. Giovanni Mastai-Ferretti), Italian churchman (d. 1878)
- May 15 – James Mayer de Rothschild, German-born banker (d. 1868)
- May 17 – Anne Isabella Milbanke, English wife of Lord Byron (d. 1860)
- May 18 – Margaret Ann Neve, Guernesiaise supercentenarian (d. 1903)
- May 21 – Gaspard-Gustave Coriolis, French engineer and scientist (d. 1843)
- June 13 – William Austin Burt, American inventor, "father of the typewriter" (d. 1858)
- June 16 – John Linnell, English painter (d. 1882)
- June 21 – Ferdinand Christian Baur, German theologian (d. 1860)

=== July–December ===
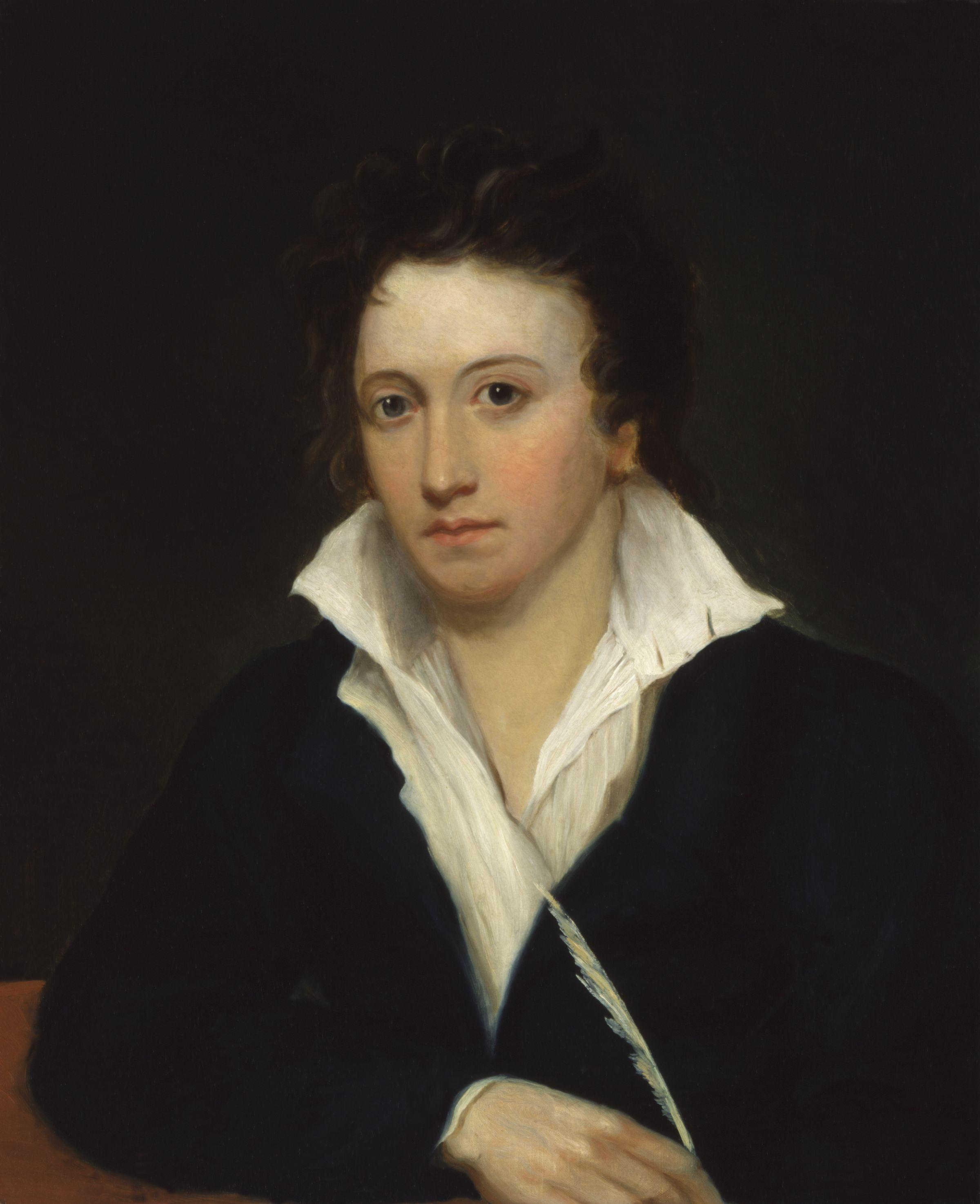
Percy Bysshe Shelley

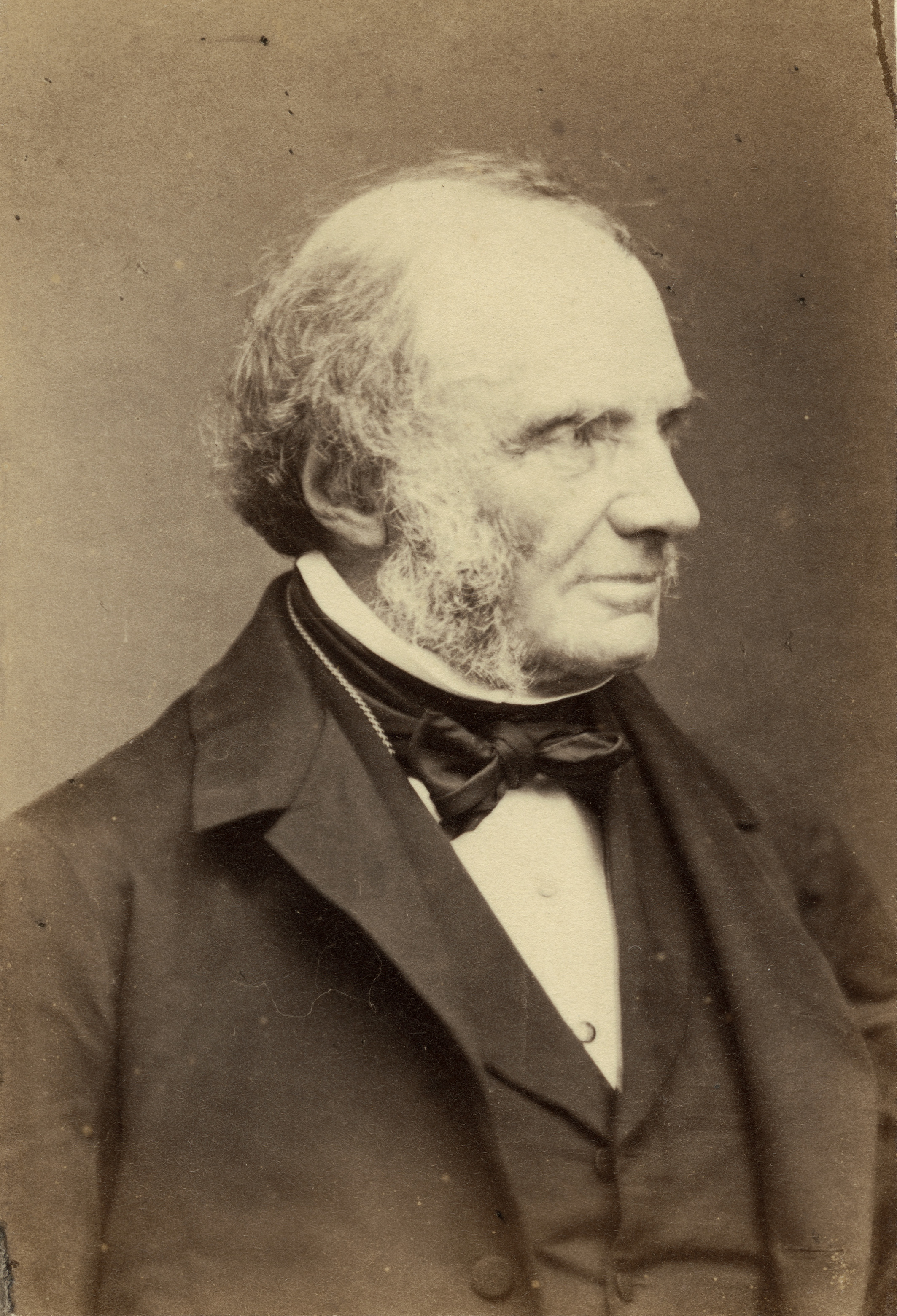
John Russell, 1st Earl Russell

- July 7 – William Henry Smith, English newsvendor and bookseller (d. 1865)
- July 10 – Frederick Marryat, British naval captain and novelist (d. 1848)
- July 27 – Maria Quitéria, Brazilian national heroine (d. 1853)
- August 4 – Percy Bysshe Shelley, English poet (d. 1822)
- August 13 – Adelaide of Saxe-Meiningen, queen of William IV of the United Kingdom (d. 1849)
- August 18 – John Russell, 1st Earl Russell, Prime Minister of the United Kingdom (d. 1878)
- August 22 – John Church Hamilton, American historian (d. 1882)
- August 26 – Manuel Oribe, 2nd President of Uruguay (d. 1857)
- September 2 – Vicente Ramón Roca, 3rd President of Ecuador (d. 1858)
- September 19 – William Backhouse Astor, Sr., American business tycoon (d. 1875)
- September 26 – William Hobson, first Governor of New Zealand (d. 1842)
- October 29 – Thomas Livingstone Mitchell, explorer, Surveyor-General of New South Wales, Australia (d. 1855)
- November 4 – Carlos Antonio López, president of Paraguay (d. 1862)
- November 10 – Samuel Nelson, Associate Justice of the Supreme Court of the United States (d. 1873)
- November 11 – Mary Anne Evans, wife of Benjamin Disraeli (d. 1872)
- November 28 – Victor Cousin, French philosopher (d. 1867)
- December 1 – Nikolai Lobachevsky, Russian mathematician (d. 1856)
- December 5 – Andrés de Santa Cruz, Peruvian military officer, seventh President of Peru and President of Bolivia (d. 1865)
- December 6 – William II of the Netherlands (d. 1849)
- date unknown – Nodira, Uzbek poet and stateswoman (d. 1842)

1793

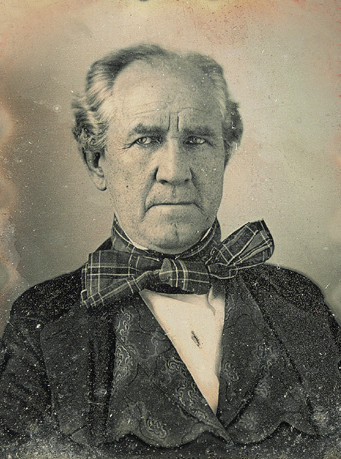
Sam Houston

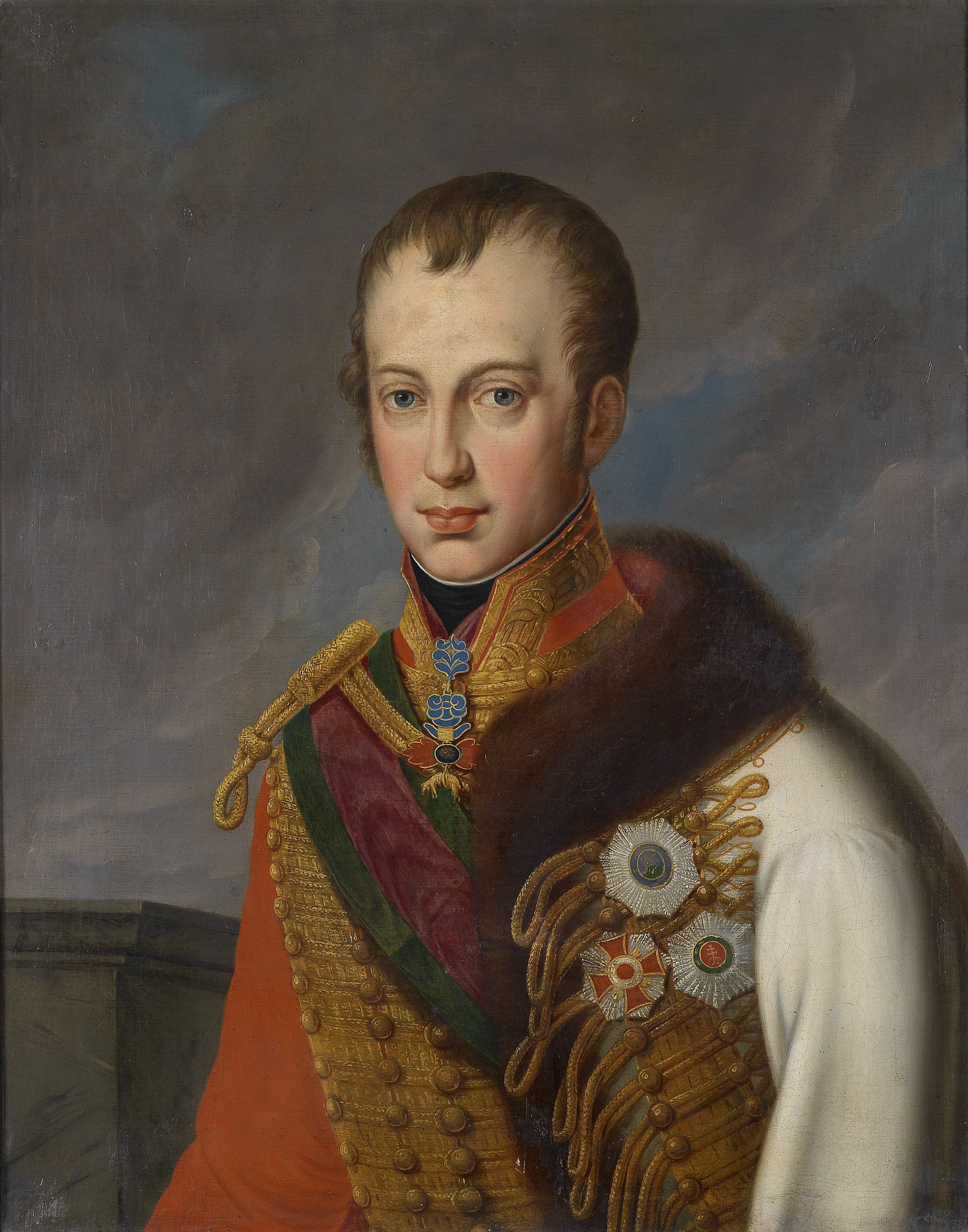
Ferdinand I of Austria

- January 3 – Lucretia Mott, American women's rights activist and abolitionist (d. 1880)
- January 11 – Johanna Stegen, German heroine (d. 1842)
- January 14 – Wojciech Chrzanowski, Polish general (d. 1861)
- March 2 – Sam Houston, American President of the Republic of Texas (d. 1863)
- March 3 – William Macready, English actor (d. 1873)
- March 4 – Karl Lachmann, German philologist (d. 1851)
- March 6 – William Dick, Scottish veterinarian, founder of Edinburgh Veterinary College (d. 1866)
- April 8 – Karl Ludwig Hencke, German astronomer (d. 1866)
- April 19 – Emperor Ferdinand I of Austria (d. 1875)
- June 6 – Edward C. Delavan, American temperance movement leader (d. 1871)
- June 29 – Josef Ressel, German-Bohemian inventor (d. 1857)
- July 13 – John Clare, English "peasant poet" (d. 1864)
- July 15 – Almira Hart Lincoln Phelps, American educator, scientist and writer (d. 1884)
- July 18 – Maria Caroline Gibert de Lametz, French stage actress, later Princess Consort and regent de facto of Monaco (d. 1879)
- July 20 – John Ireland Howe, American inventor (d. 1876)
- August 19 – Barthélemy Thimonnier, French inventor (d. 1857)
- August 25 – John Neal, American writer, critic, and women's rights activist (d. 1876)
- September 5 – John L. Burns, American veteran of the War of 1812, civilian combatant for the Union Army during the American Civil War. (d. 1872)
- September 25 – Felicia Hemans, British poet (d. 1835)
- November 3 – Stephen F. Austin, American pioneer (d. 1836)
- November 17 – Charles Lock Eastlake, English painter (d. 1865)
- Approximate date – Sarah Booth, English actress (d. 1867)

1794

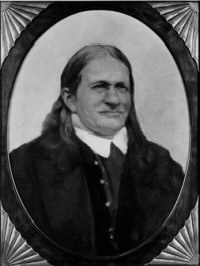
Friedlieb Ferdinand Runge

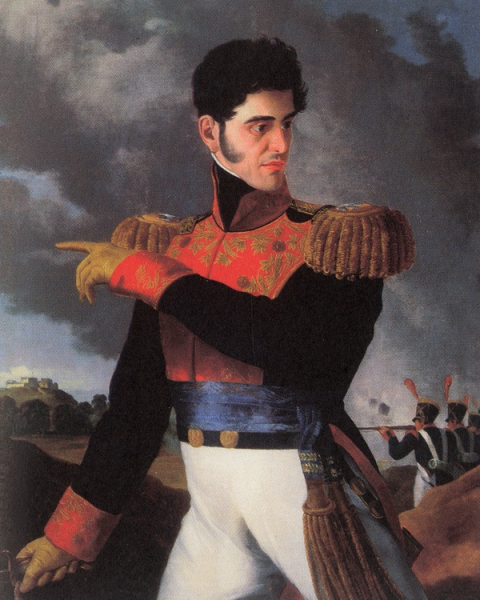
Antonio López de Santa Anna

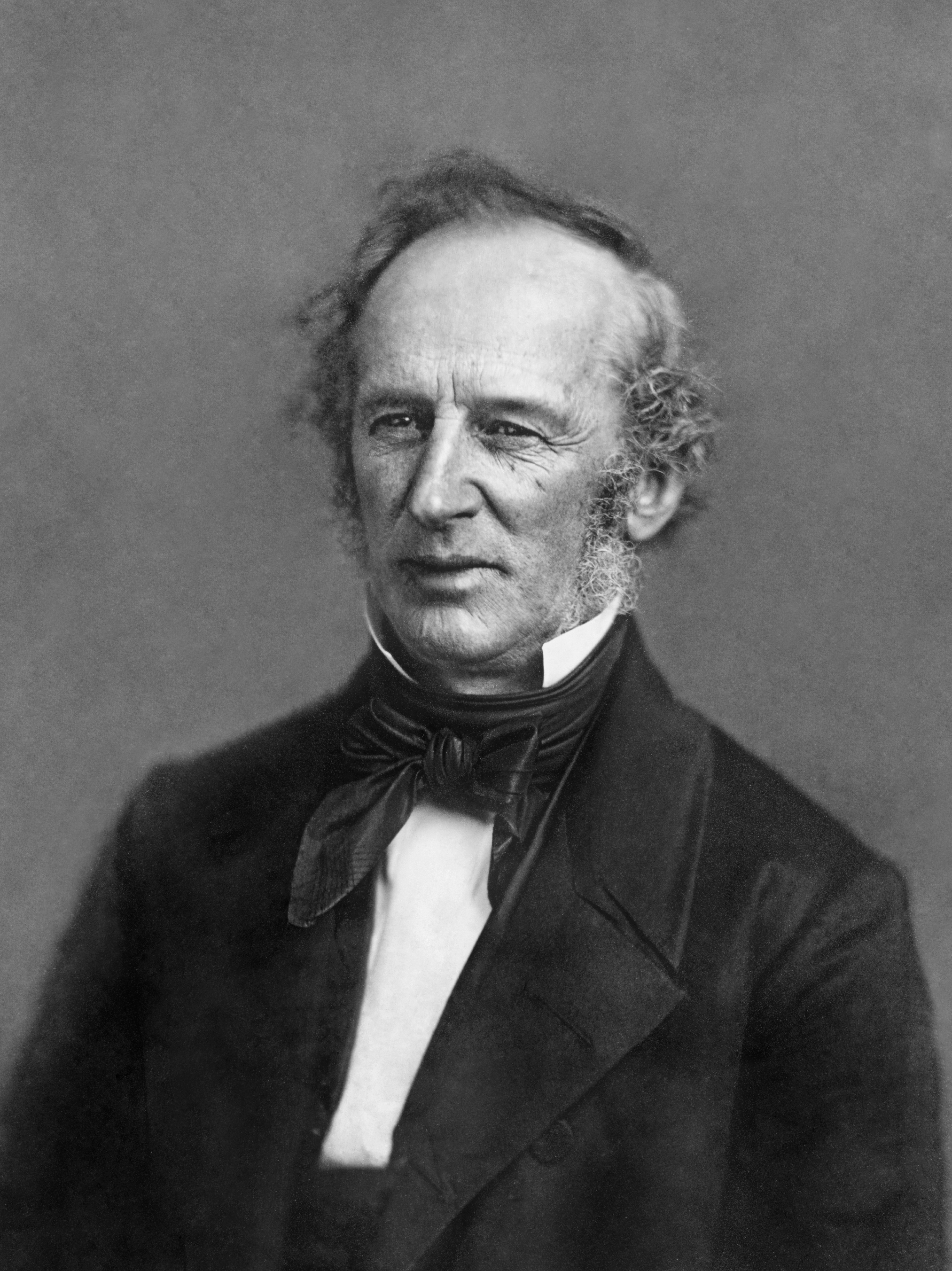
Cornelius Vanderbilt

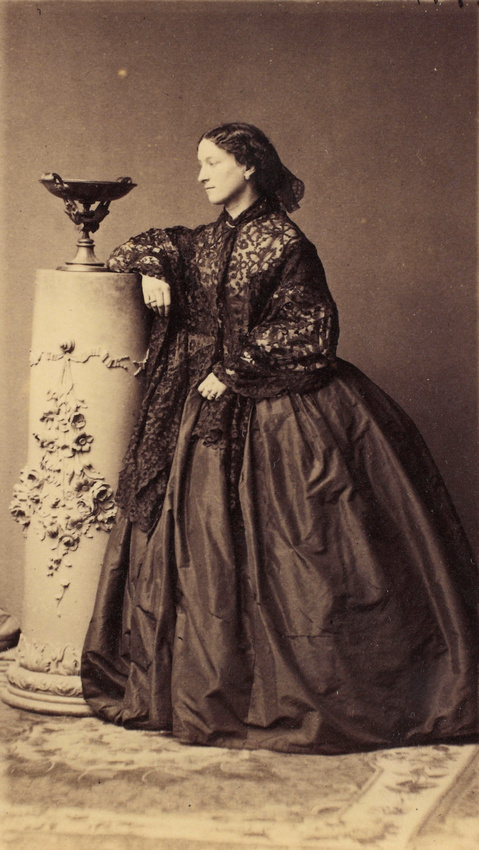
Jeanne Villepreux-Power

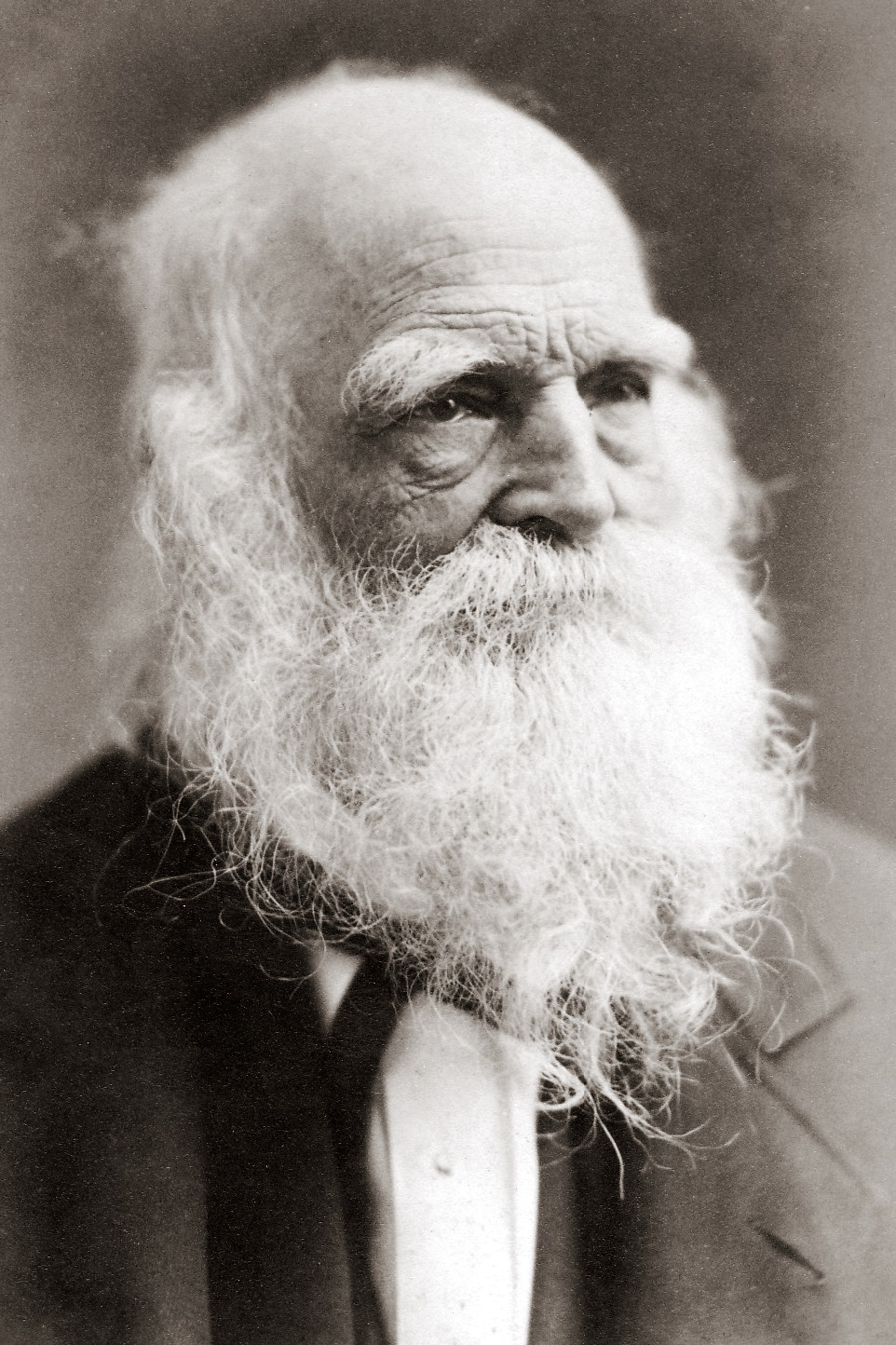
William Cullen Bryant

- January 7 – Eilhard Mitscherlich, German chemist (d. 1863)
- February 8 – Friedlieb Ferdinand Runge, German chemist (d. 1867)
- February 11 – Charlotta Eriksson, Swedish actor (d. 1862)
- February 20 – William Carleton, Irish novelist (d. 1869)
- February 21 – Antonio López de Santa Anna, Mexican general and President of Mexico (d. 1876)
- March 5
  - Robert Cooper Grier, Associate Justice of the Supreme Court of the United States (d. 1870)
  - Joseph Livesey, English temperance movement campaigner (d. 1884)
- April 10 – Matthew Calbraith Perry, American commodore (d. 1858)
- April 11 – Edward Everett, American politician (d. 1865)
- May 17 – Anna Brownell Jameson, British writer (d. 1860)
- May 24 – William Whewell, English scientist, philosopher and historian of science (d. 1866)
- May 27 – Cornelius Vanderbilt, American entrepreneur (d. 1877)
- June 16 – María Trinidad Sánchez, heroine of the Dominican War of Independence (d. 1846)
- July 5 – Sylvester Graham, American nutritionist, inventor (d. 1851)
- July 7 – Frances Stackhouse Acton, British botanist, archaeologist, writer and artist (d. 1881)
- July 18 – Feargus O'Connor, Irish political radical, Chartist leader (d. 1855)
- July 28 – Charles Longley, Archbishop of Canterbury (d. 1868)
- August 8 – Francesco Puccinotti, Italian pathologist (d. 1872)
- September 24 – Jeanne Villepreux-Power, French marine biologist (d. 1871)
- November 3 – William Cullen Bryant, American poet (d. 1878)
- November 10 – Robert Towns, merchant, founder of Townsville, Queensland, Australia (d. 1873)

=== Date unknown ===
- Caroline Howard Gilman, American author (d. 1888)
- Gustafva Lindskog, Swedish athlete (d. 1851)

1795

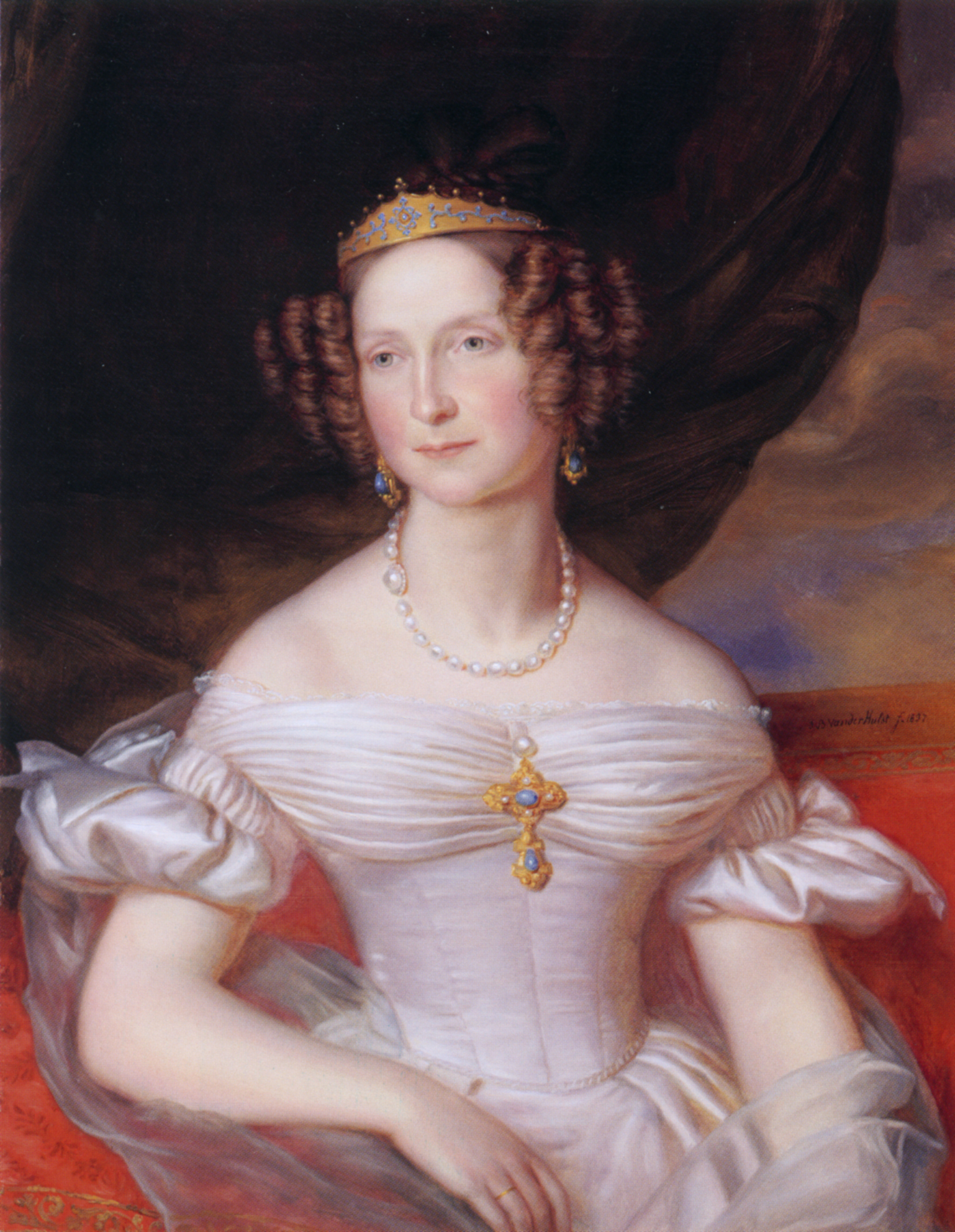
Anna Pavlovna of Russia

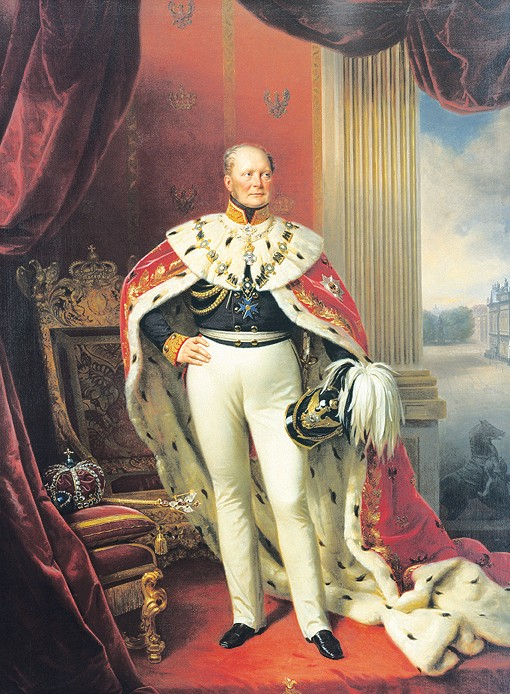
Frederick William IV of Prussia

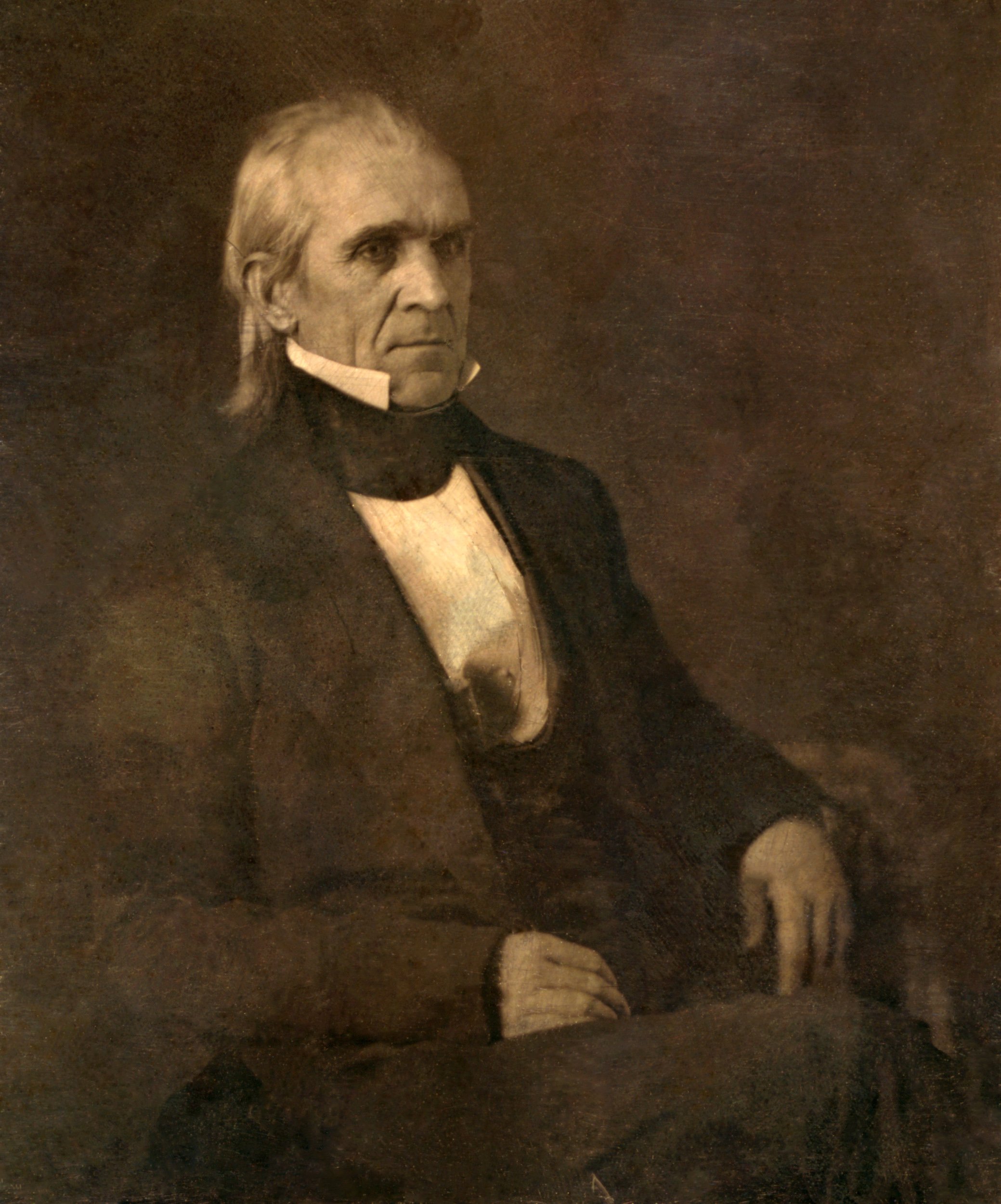
James K. Polk

- January 6 – Anselme Payen, French chemist (d. 1878)
- January 18 – Anna Pavlovna of Russia, queen consort of the Netherlands (d. 1865)
- January 26 – Policarpa Salavarrieta, Colombian spy, revolutionary heroine working for the independence of Colombia (d. 1817)
- February 3 – Antonio José de Sucre, Venezuelan revolutionary leader, general and statesman (d. 1830)
- February 4 – Jakob von Hartmann, Bavarian general (d. 1873)
- February 18 – George Peabody, American businessman and "father of modern philanthropy" (d. 1869)
- February 16 – Sarah Ann Gill, Barbadian national heroine (d. 1866)
- March 12 – William Lyon Mackenzie, Scottish-born Canadian journalist, 1st Mayor of Toronto (d. 1861)
- March 14 – Robert Lucas Pearsall, English-born composer, sets "In dulce jubilo" (d. 1856)
- May 4 – Annestine Beyer, Danish reform pedagogue (d. 1884)
- May 19 – Johns Hopkins, American businessman and philanthropist (d. 1873)
- May 23 – Charles Barry, English architect (d. 1860)
- June 11 – Sara Torsslow, Swedish actor (d. 1859)
- June 13 – Thomas Arnold, English school reformer (d. 1842)
- June 19 – James Braid, Scottish surgeon, hypnotism pioneer (d. 1860)
- June 21 – José María Pinedo, Argentinian naval commander (d. 1885)
- June 24 – Ernst Heinrich Weber, German physician, psychologist (d. 1878)
- July 5 – Georg Ernst Ludwig Hampe, German pharmacist, botanist and bryologist (d. 1880)
- July 7 – Prince Karl Theodor of Bavaria, Bavarian field marshal (d. 1875)
- August 25 – Luis José de Orbegoso, Peruvian general and politician, 11th and 12th President of Peru (d. 1847)
- August 27 – Giorgio Mitrovich, Maltese politician (d. 1885)
- September 1 – James Gordon Bennett, American newspaper publisher (d. 1872)
- September 6 – Achille Baraguey d'Hilliers, Marshal of France (d. 1878)
- September 7 – John William Polidori, English writer and physician (d. 1821)
- September 16 – Saverio Mercadante, Italian composer (d. 1870)
- September 18 – Kondraty Ryleyev, Russian poet, Decembrist (d. 1826)
- October 13 – James McDowell, American politician (d. 1851)
- October 15 – King Frederick William IV of Prussia (d. 1861)
- October 16 – William Buell Sprague, American clergyman, author (d. 1876)
- October 26 – Nikolaos Mantzaros, Greek composer (d. 1872)
- October 31 – John Keats, English poet (d. 1821)
- November 2 – James K. Polk, 11th President of the United States (d. 1849)
- November 12 – Thaddeus William Harris, American naturalist (d. 1856)
- December 2 – Guillermo (William) Miller, English-born military leader in Peru (d. 1861)
- December 3 – Rowland Hill, English teacher, inventor and social reformer (d. 1879)
- December 4 – Thomas Carlyle, Scottish-born writer, historian (d. 1881)
- December 10 – Matthias W. Baldwin, American locomotive manufacturer (d. 1866)
- December 21 – Leopold von Ranke, German historian (d. 1886)
- date unknown – Chief Oshkosh, Menominee chief (d. 1858)

1796

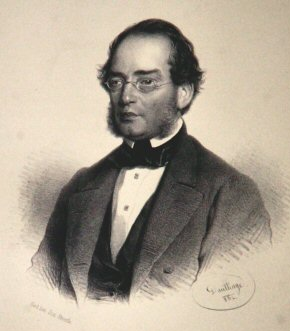
Johann Baptist Streicher born 3 January

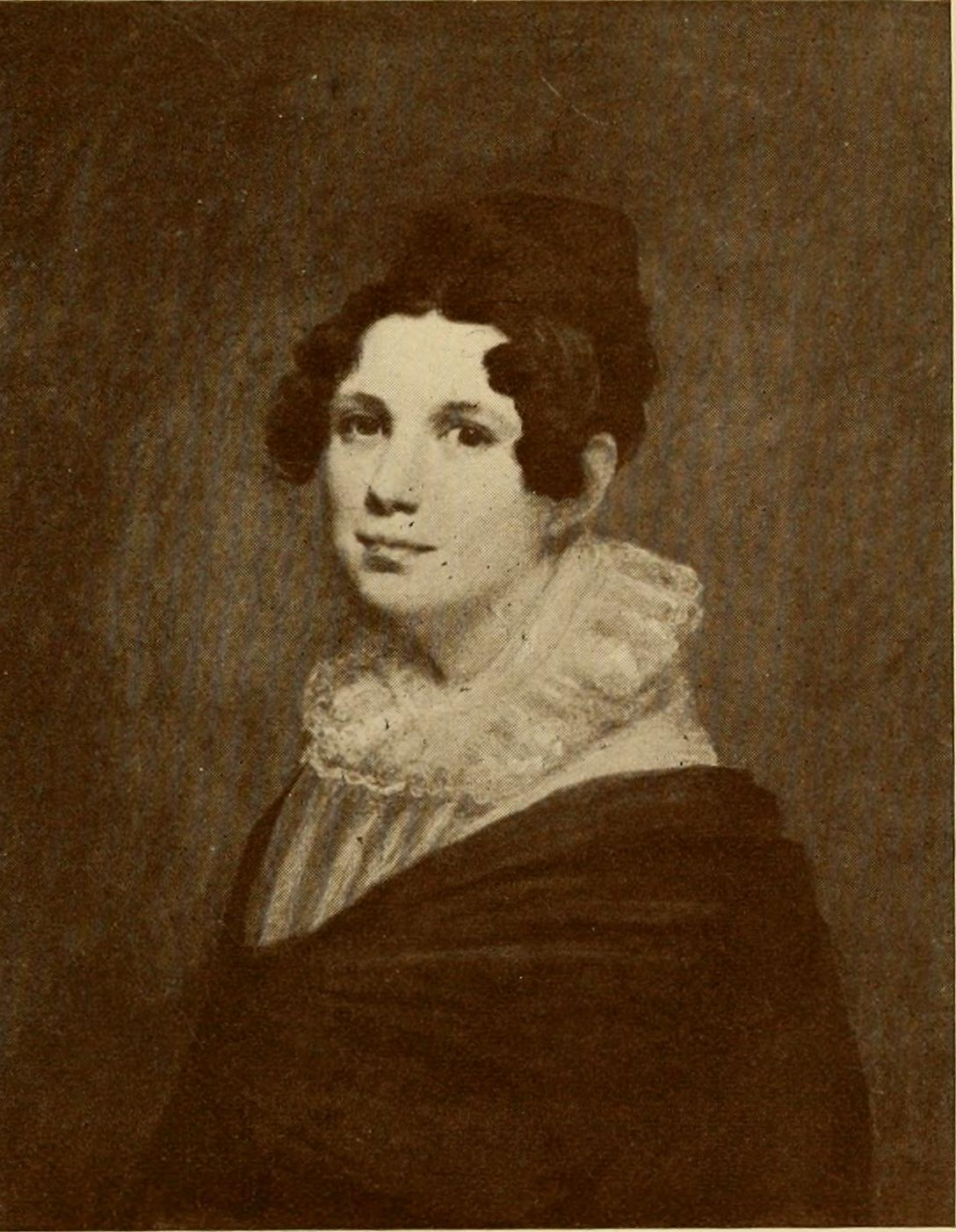
Julia Rush Cutler Ward born 5 January

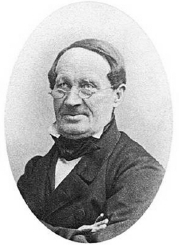
Karl Ernst Claus born 23 January

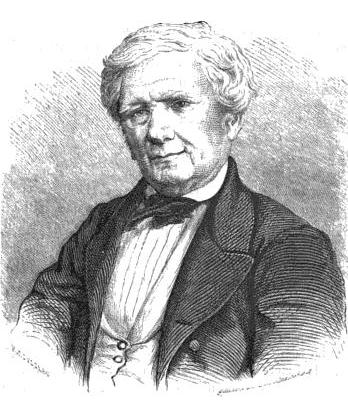
Jean Reboul born 23 January

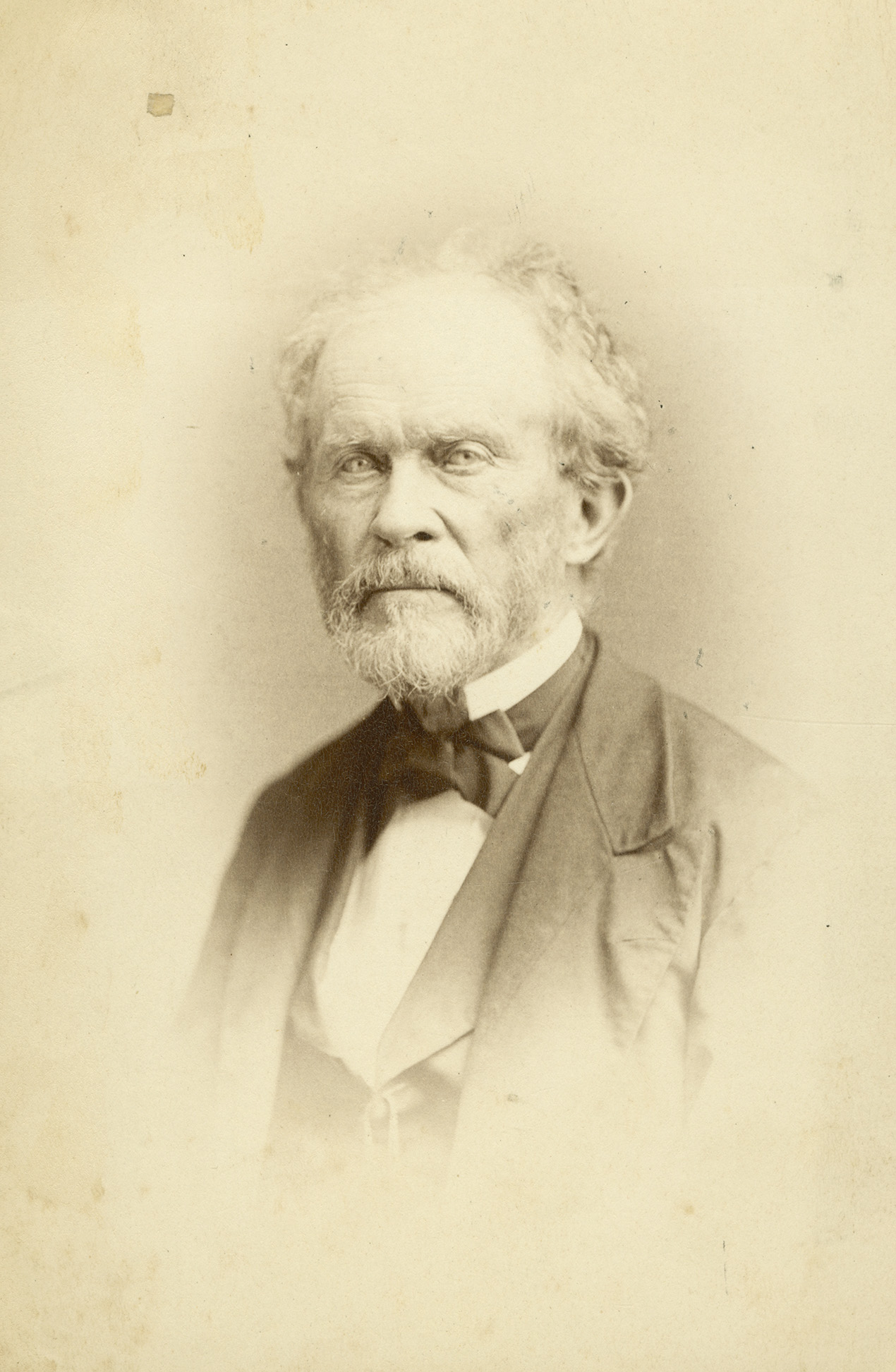
Nathaniel Jocelyn born 31 January

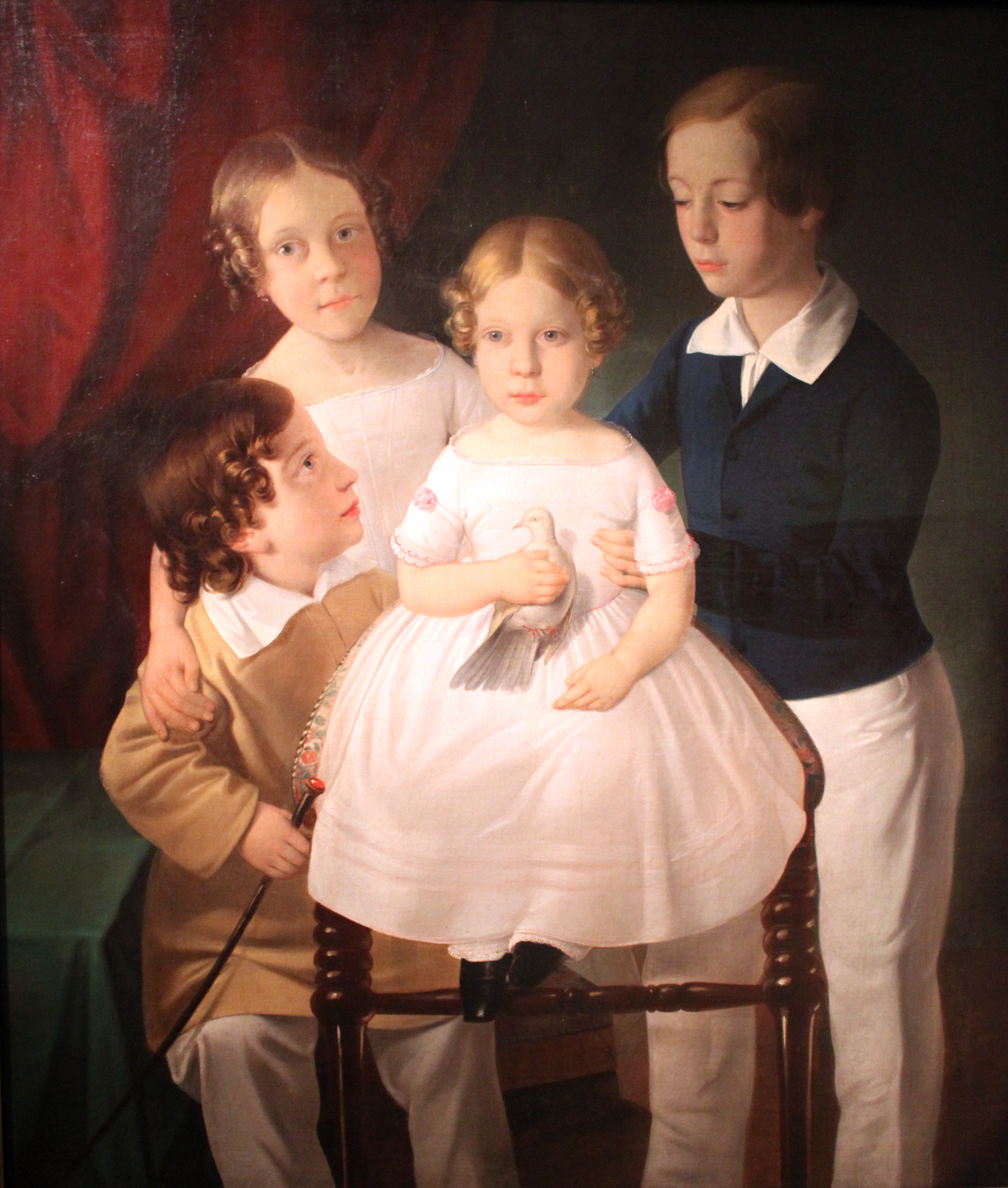
Erasmus Engert born 4 February

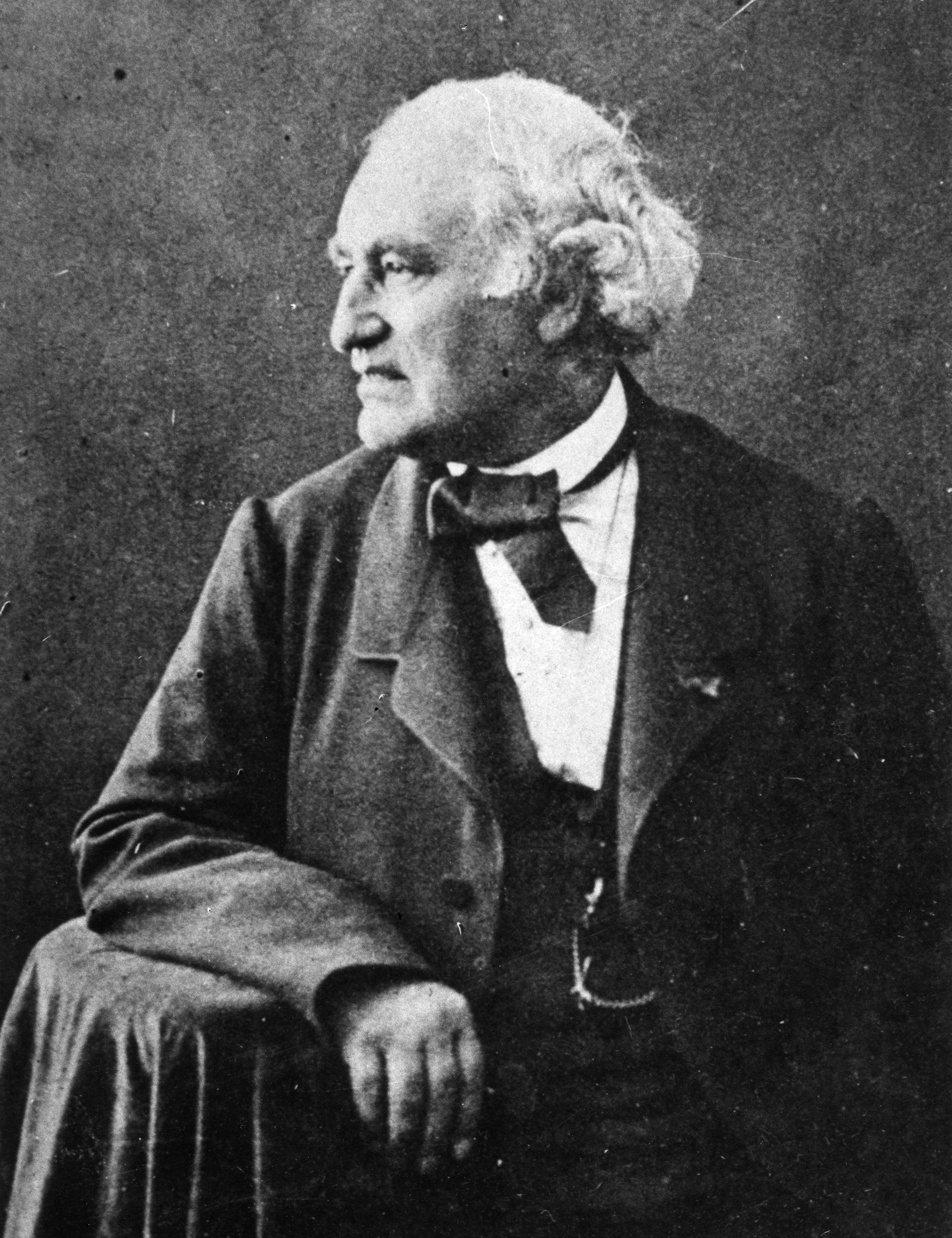
Léon Talabot born 5 February

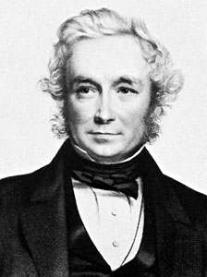
John Stevens Henslow born 6 February

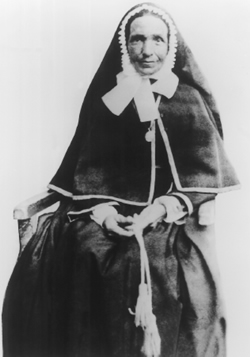
Marie-Françoise Perroton born 7 February

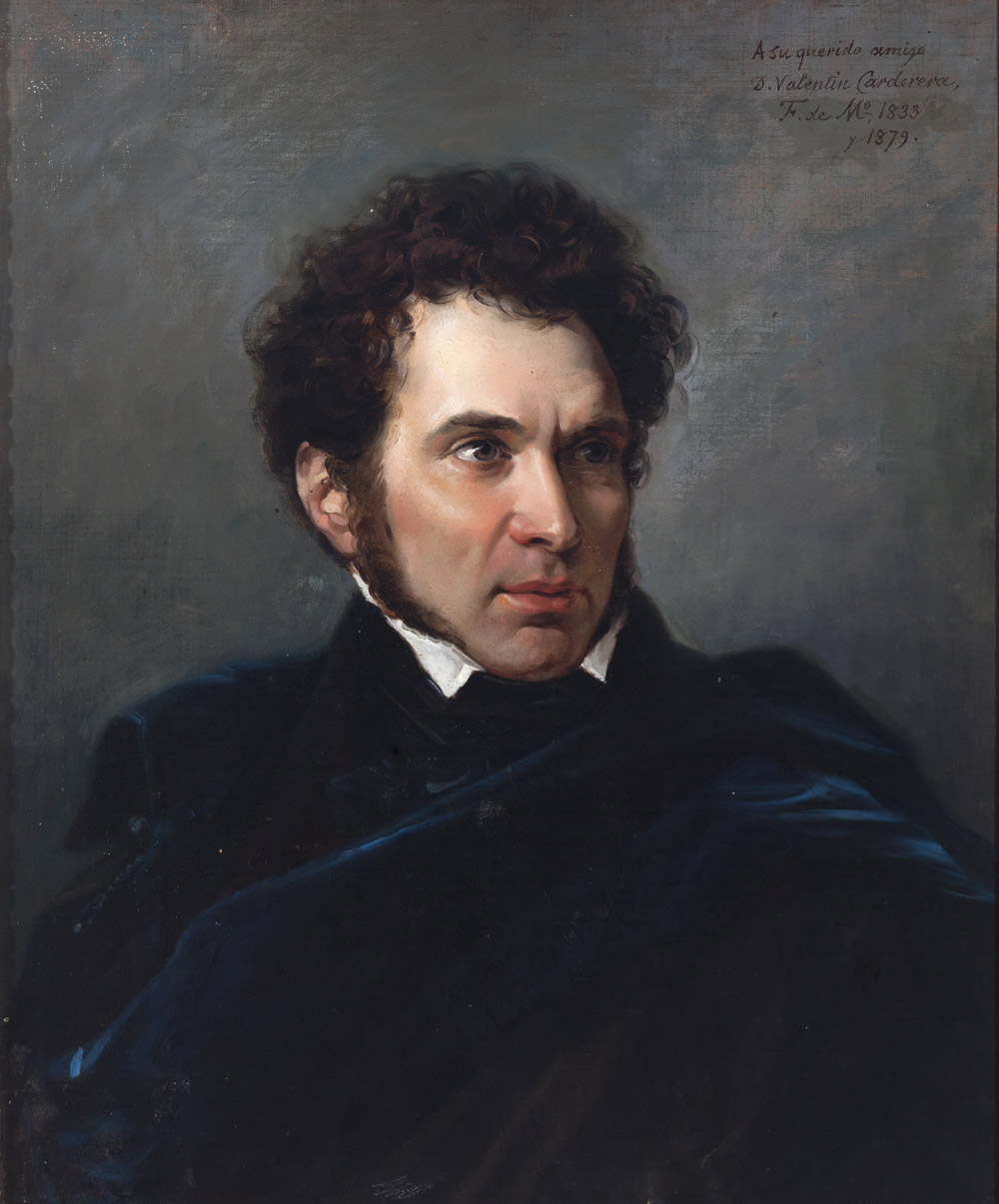
Valentín Carderera born 14 February

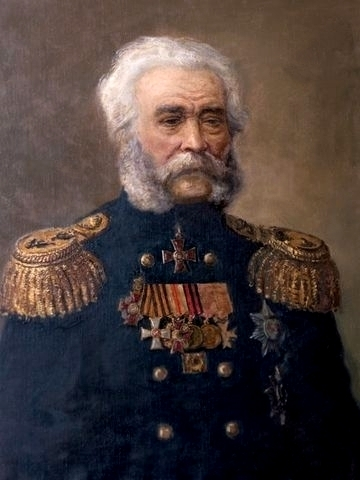
Pyotr Anjou born 15 February

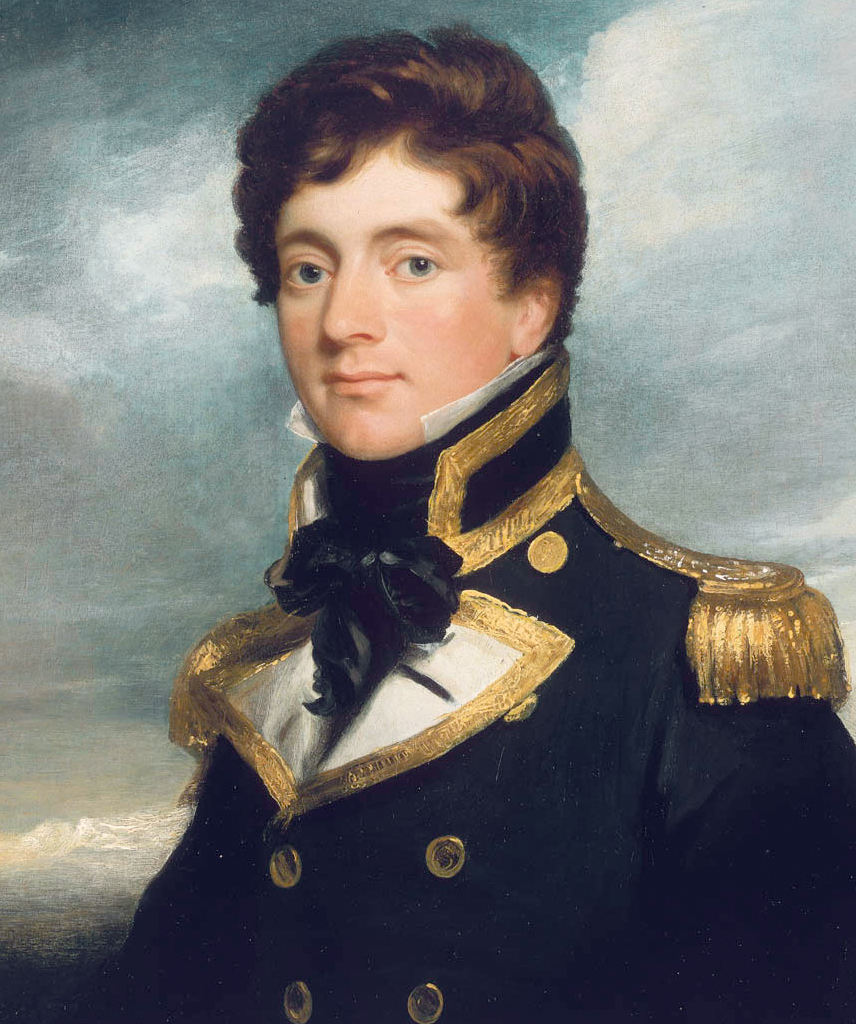
Frederick William Beechey born 17 February

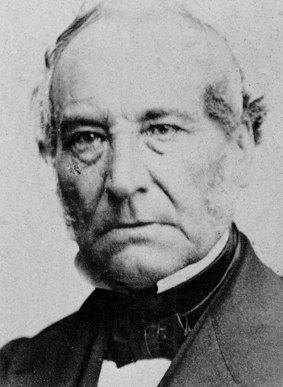
Gabriel Delafosse born 24 February

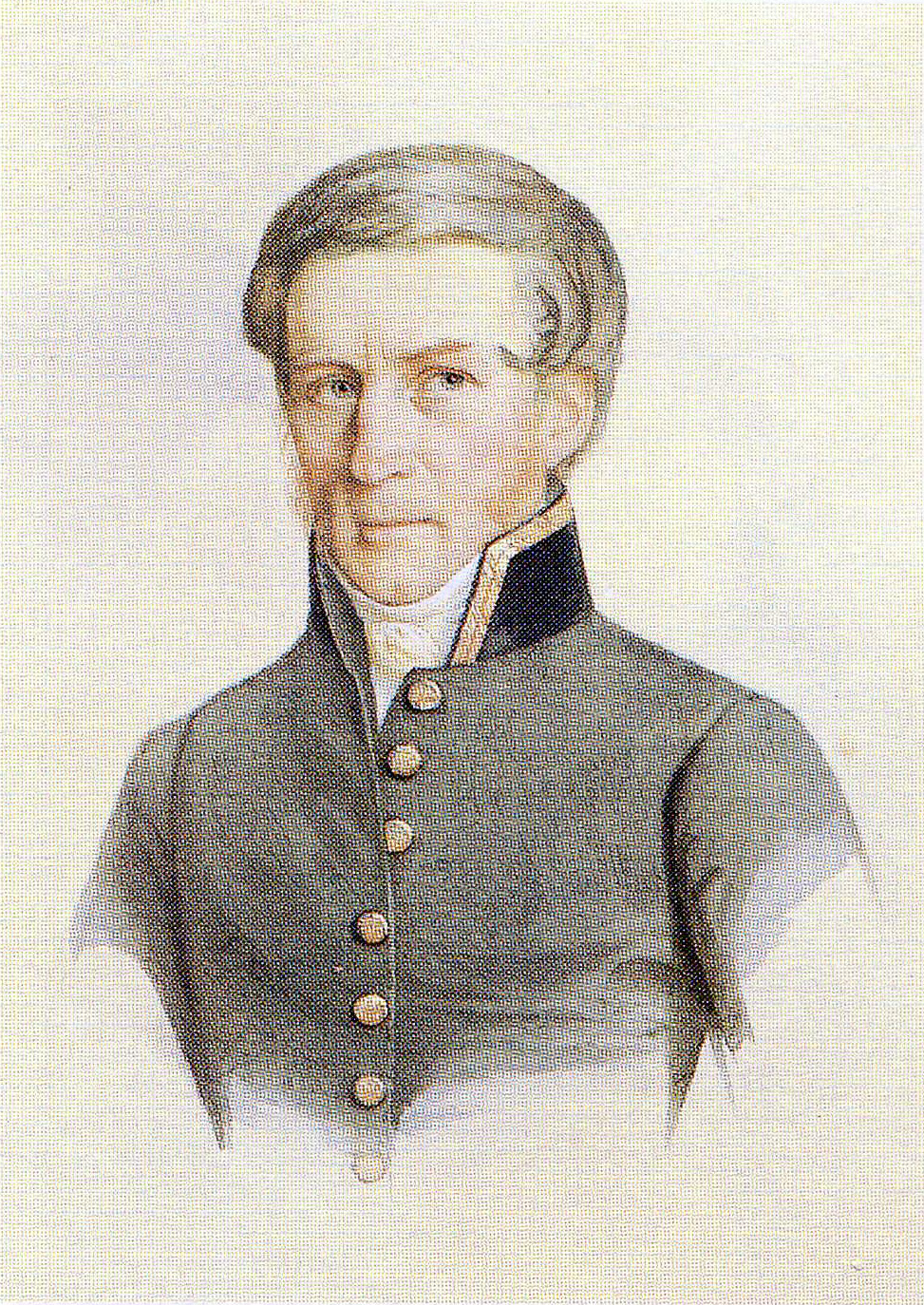
Carl Axel Gottlund born 24 February

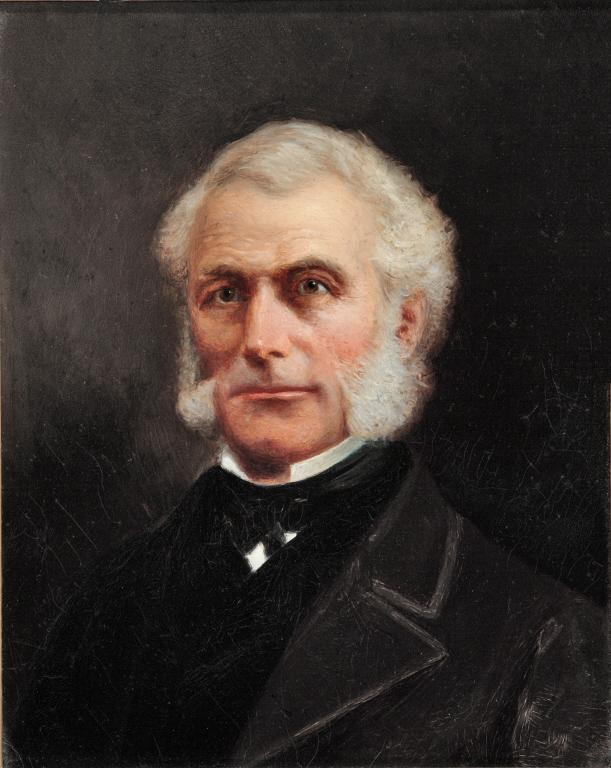
Louis-Tancrède Bouthillier born 1 March

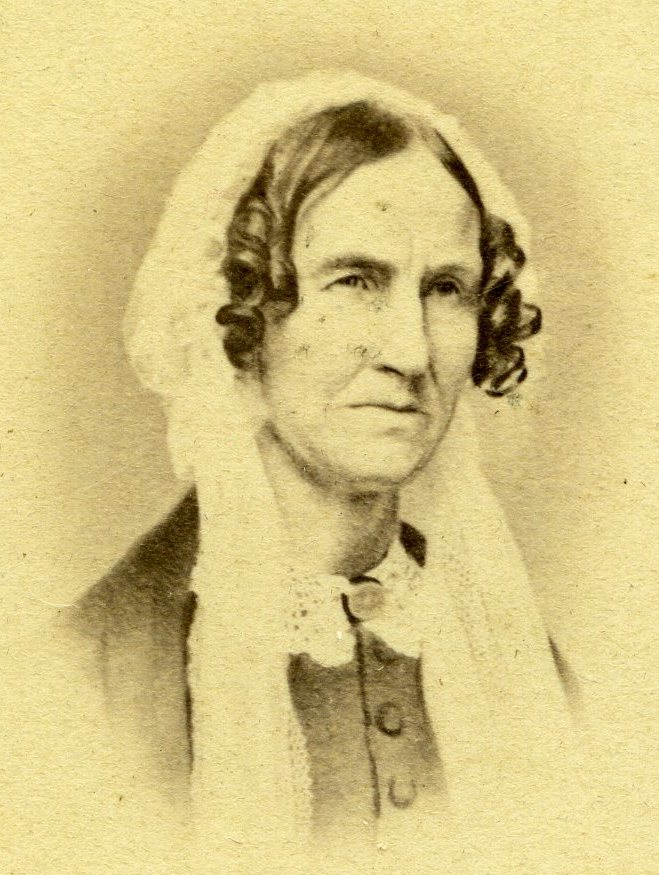
Orra White Hitchcock born 8 March

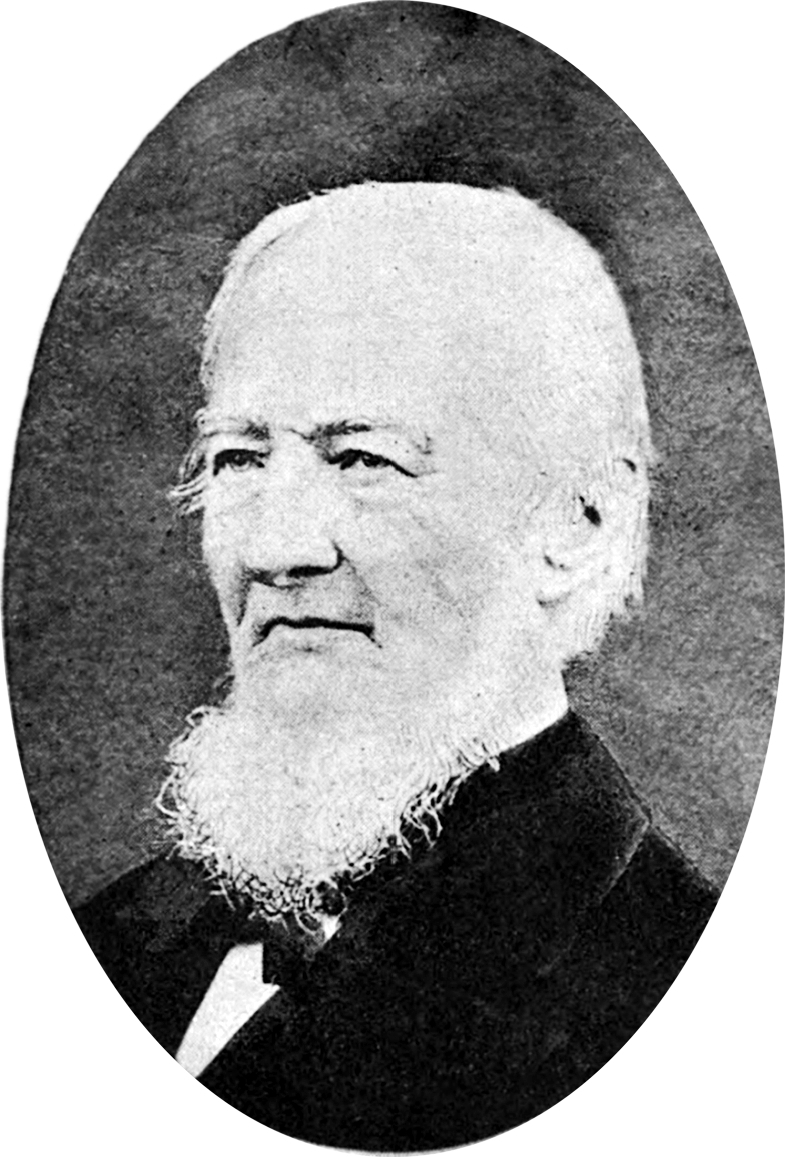
Peter Johnson Gulick born 12 March

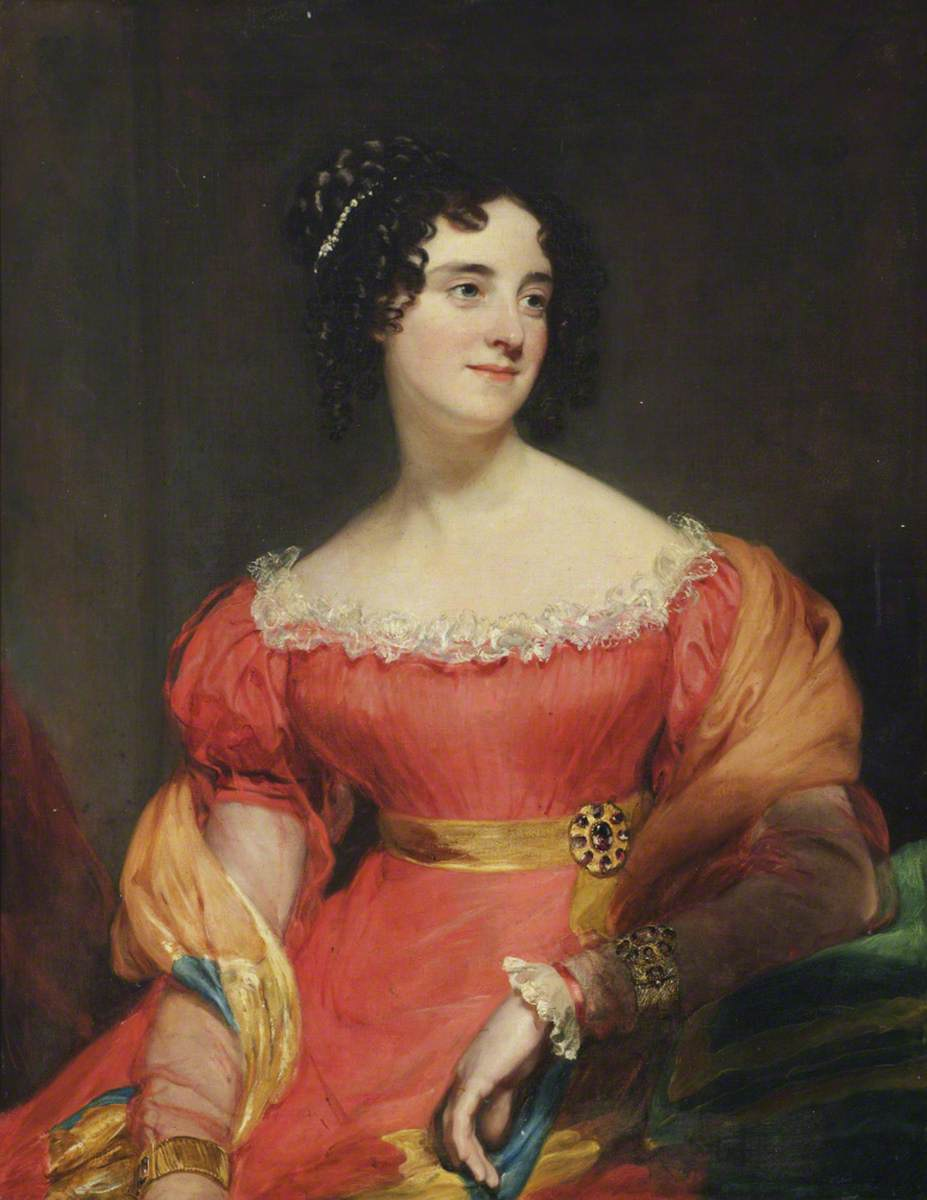
Georgiana Astley born 16 March

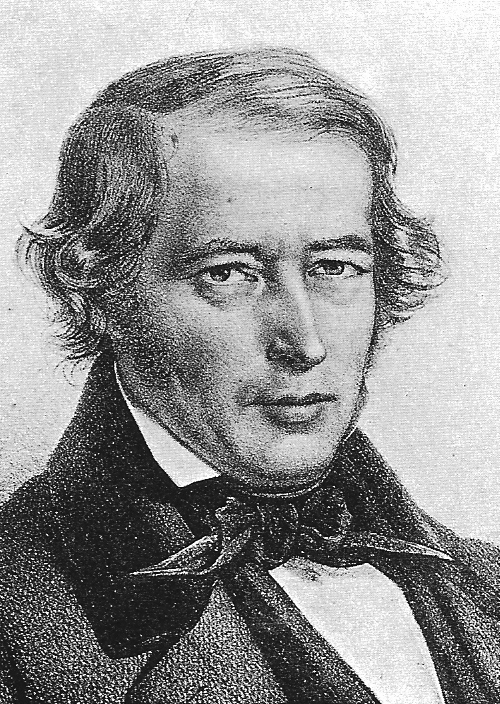
Jakob Steiner born 18 March

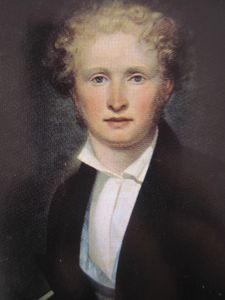
Raymond Bonheur born 20 March

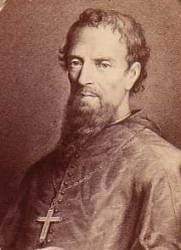
Laurent-Joseph-Marius Imbert born 23 March

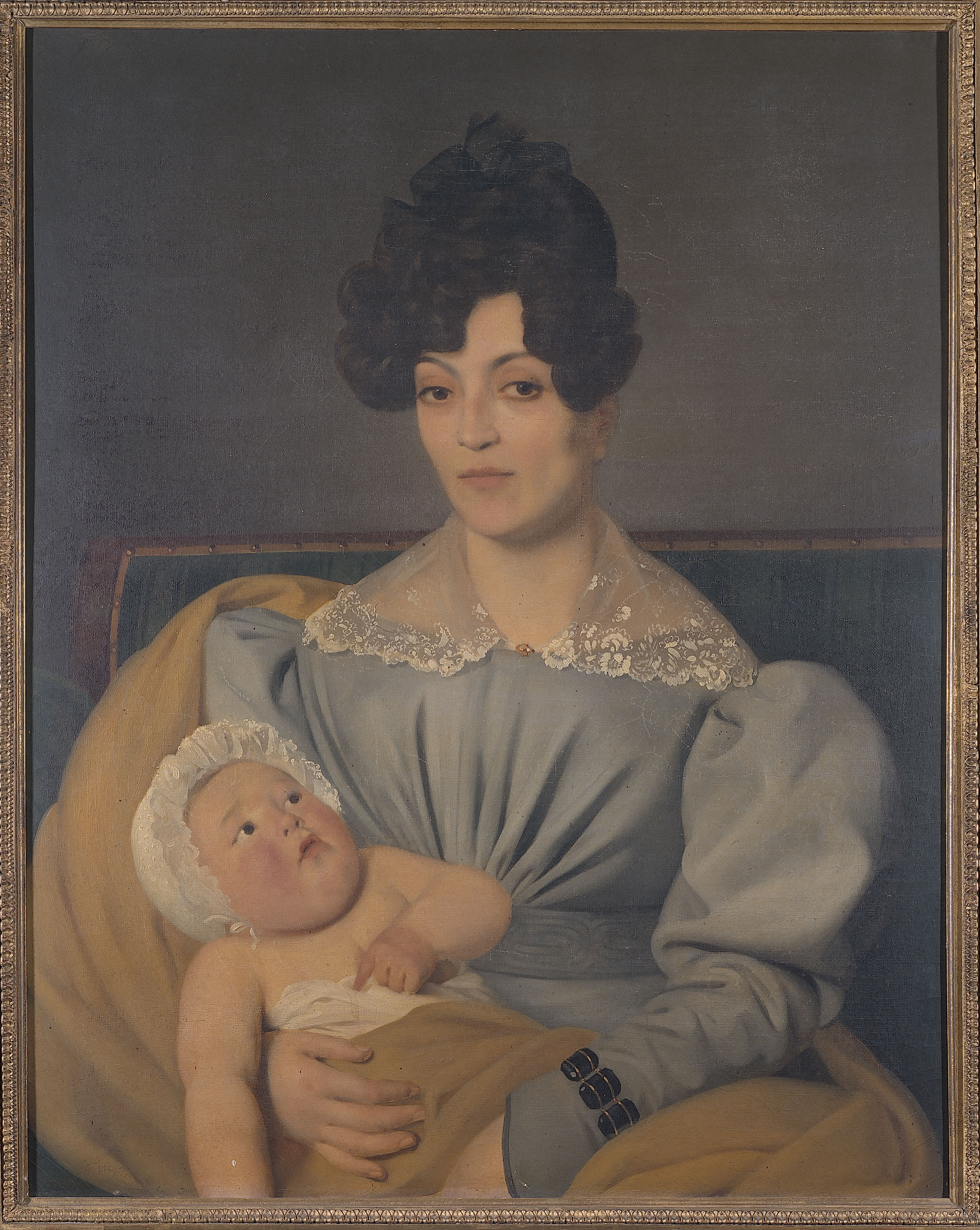
Zulma Carraud born 24 March

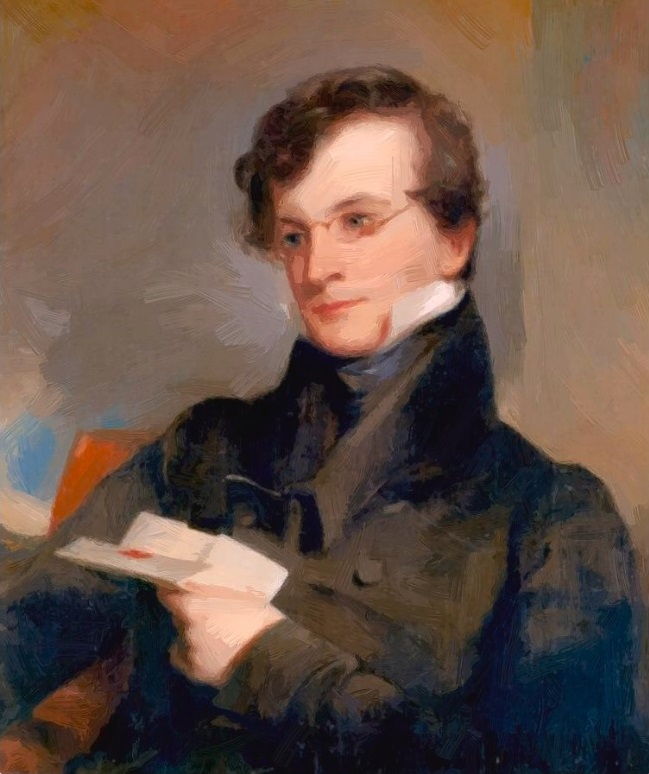
Richard Biddle born 25 March

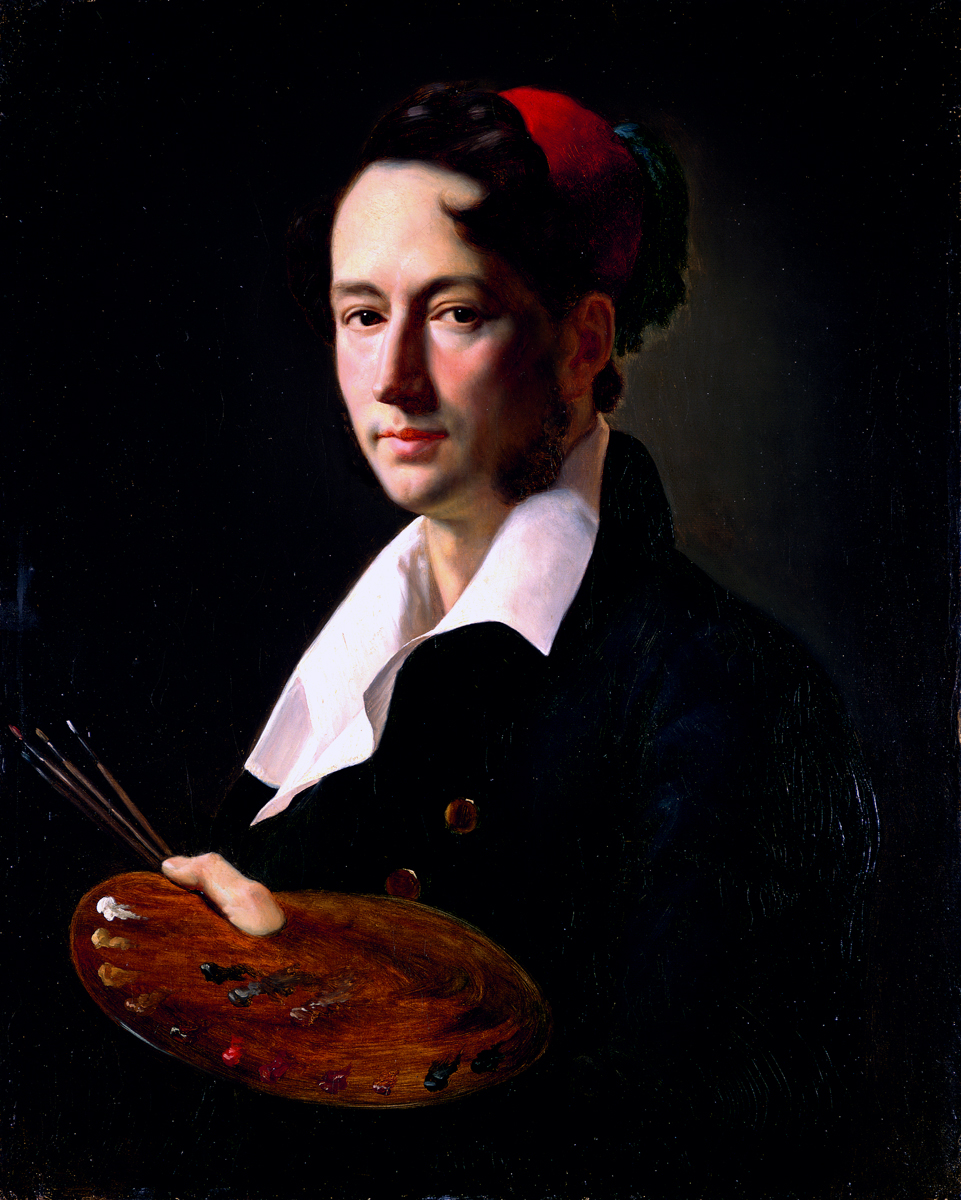
Jean-Claude Bonnefond born 27 March

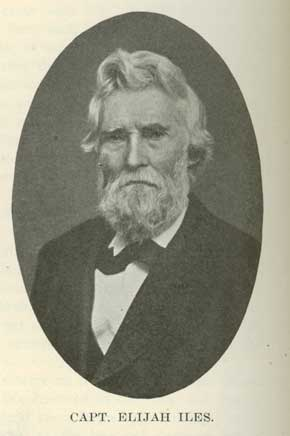
Elijah Iles born 28 March

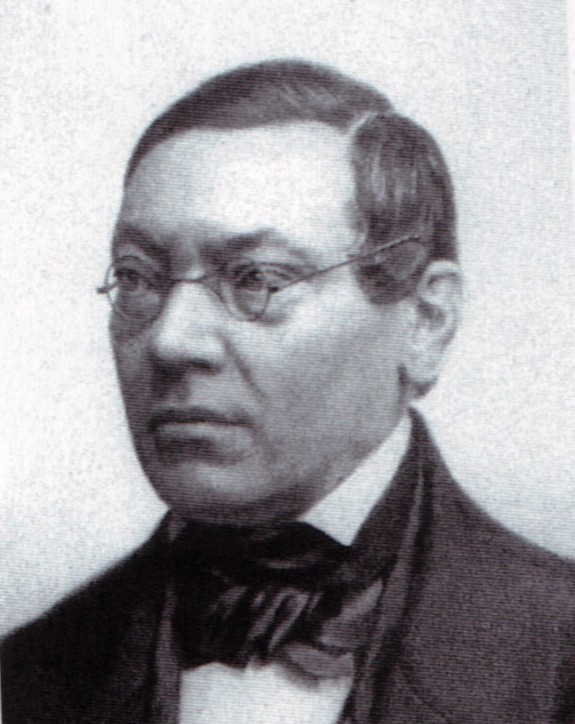
Theodor Brüggemann born 31 March

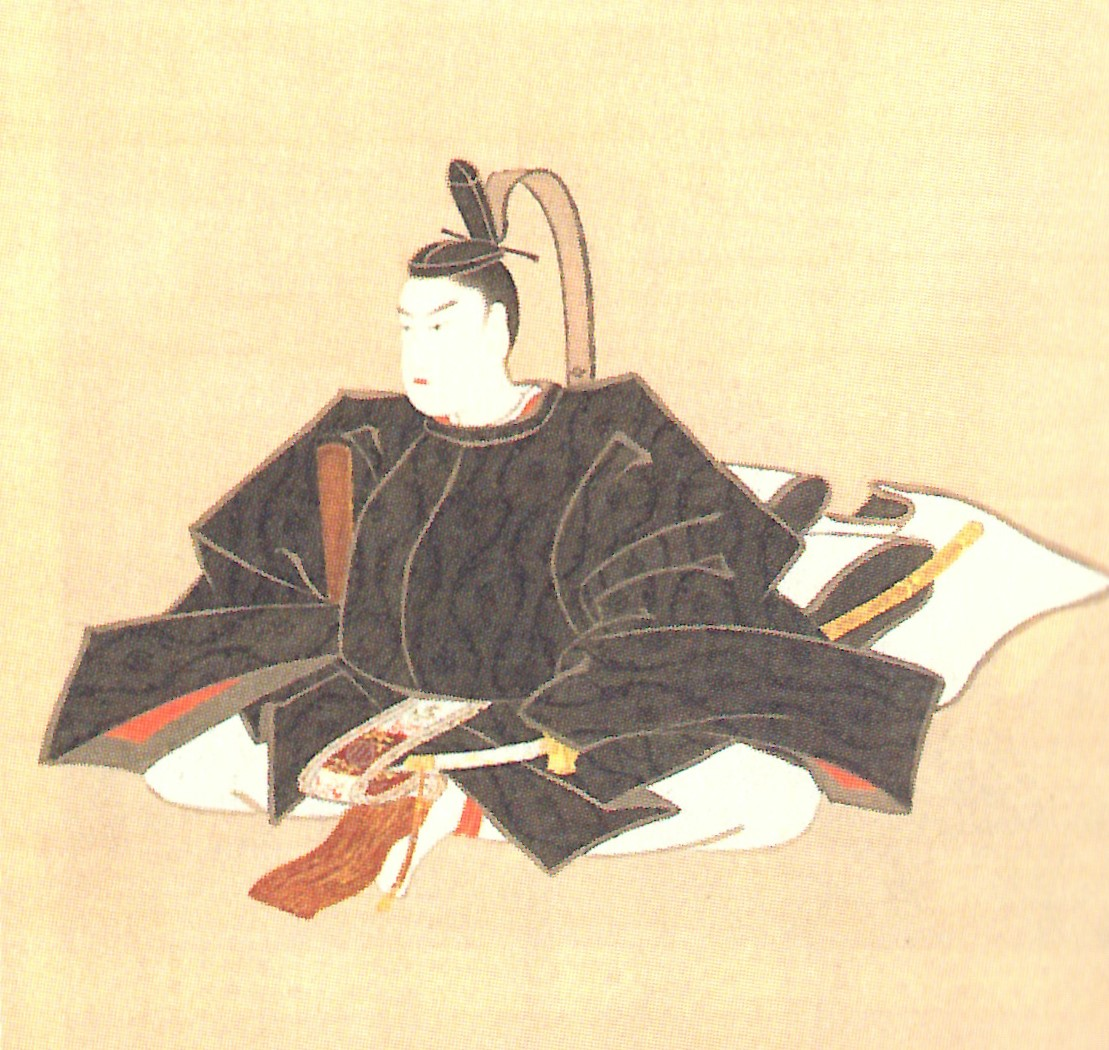
Date Chikamune born 9 April

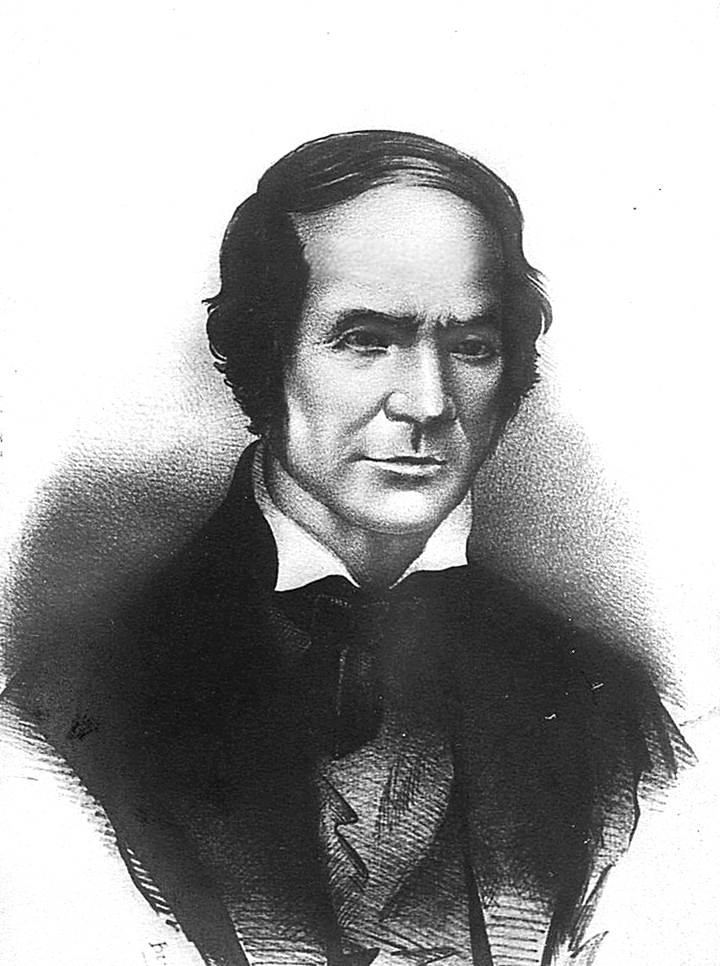
Stanisław Jachowicz born 17 April

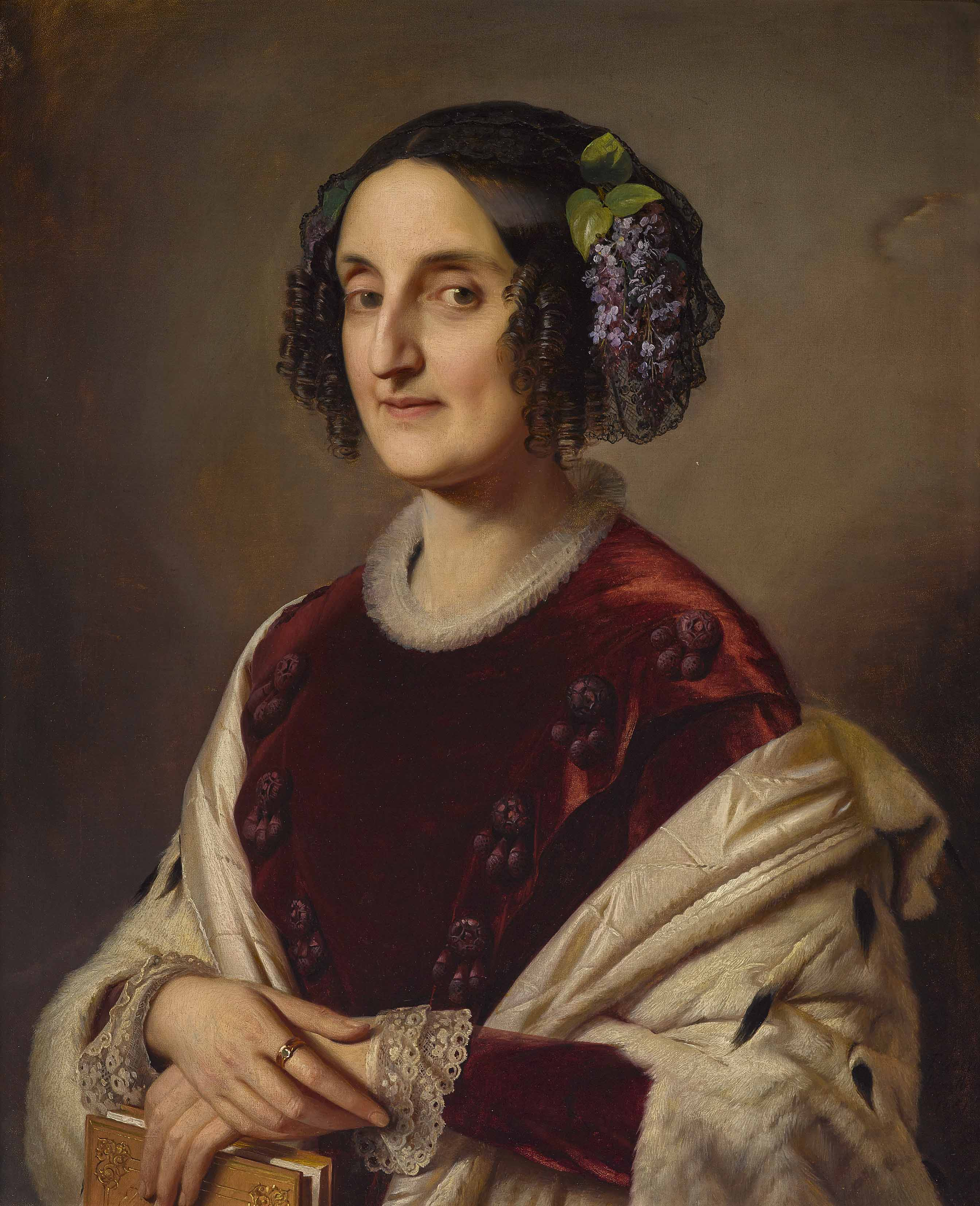
Princess Maria Ferdinanda of Saxony born 27 April

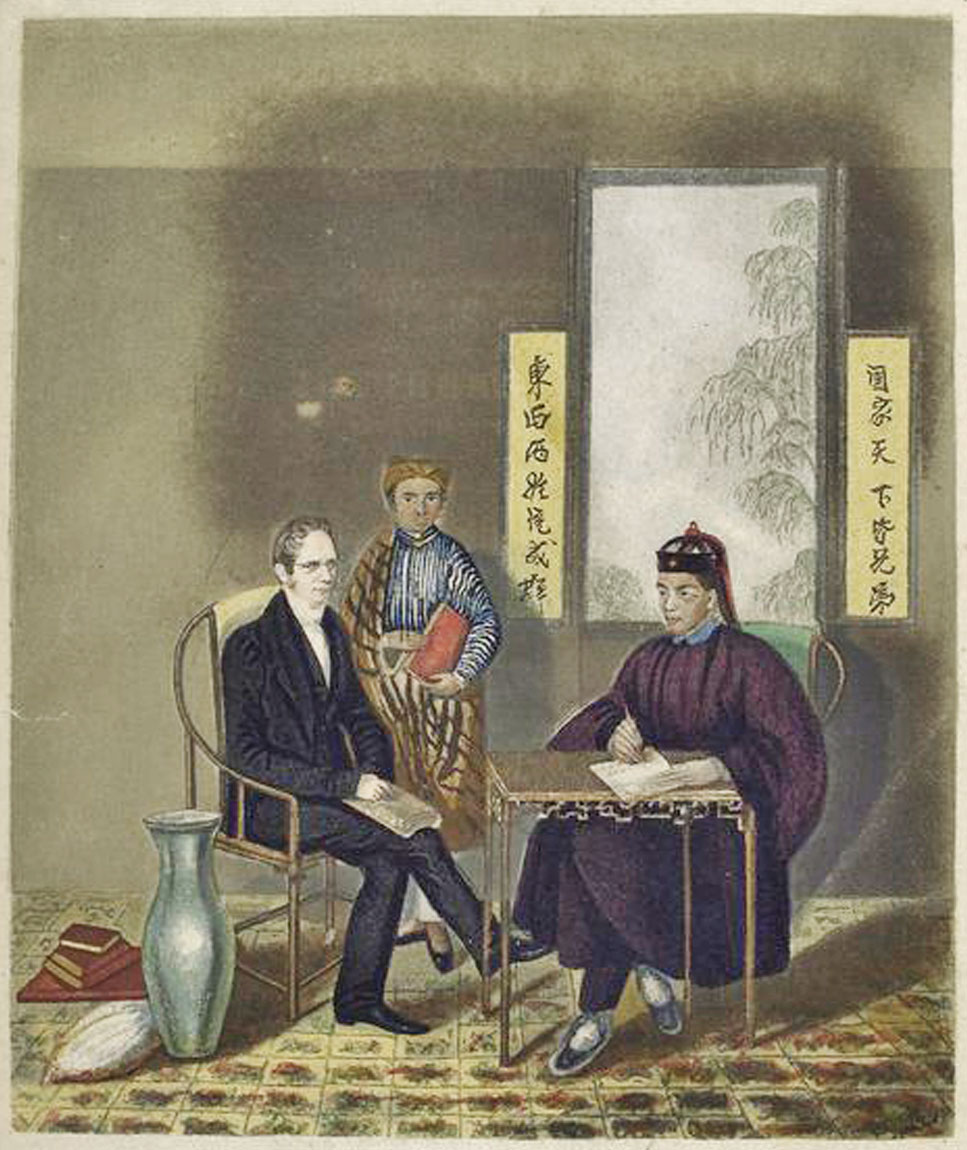
Walter Henry Medhurst born 29 April

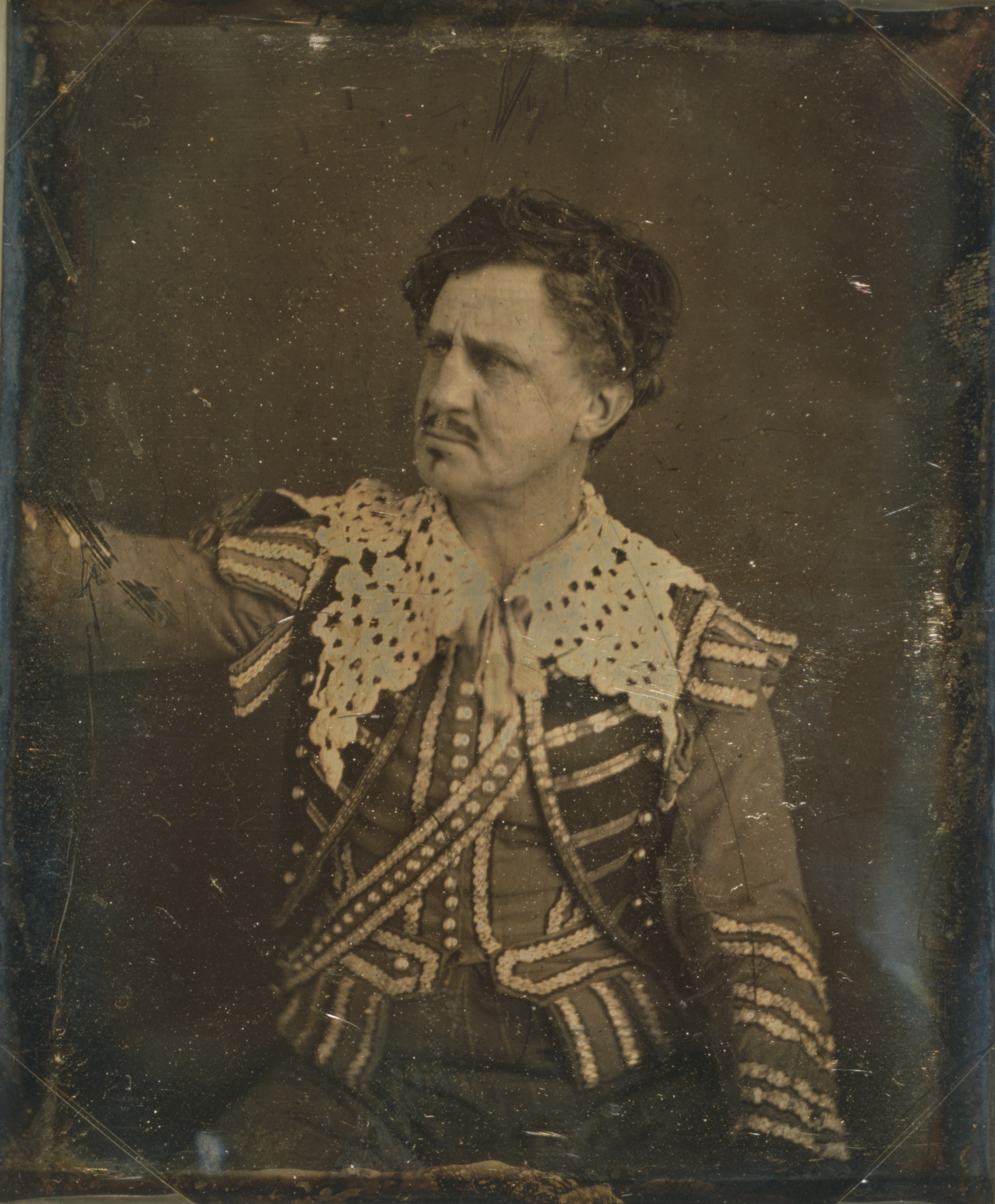
Junius Brutus Booth born 1 May

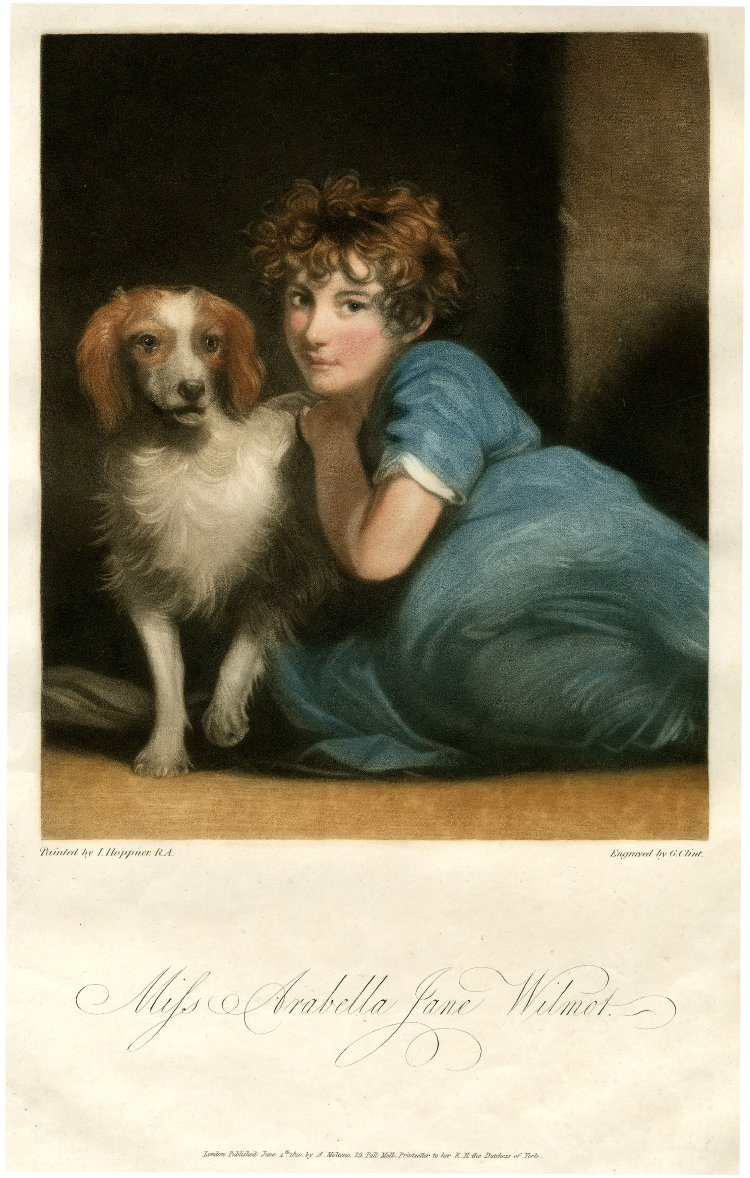
Arabella Sullivan born 1 May

Colm de Bhailís born 2 May

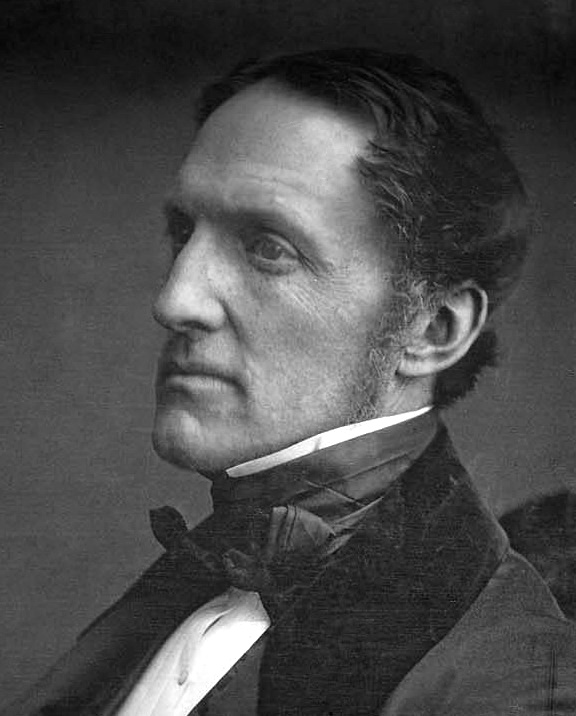
William H. Prescott born 4 May

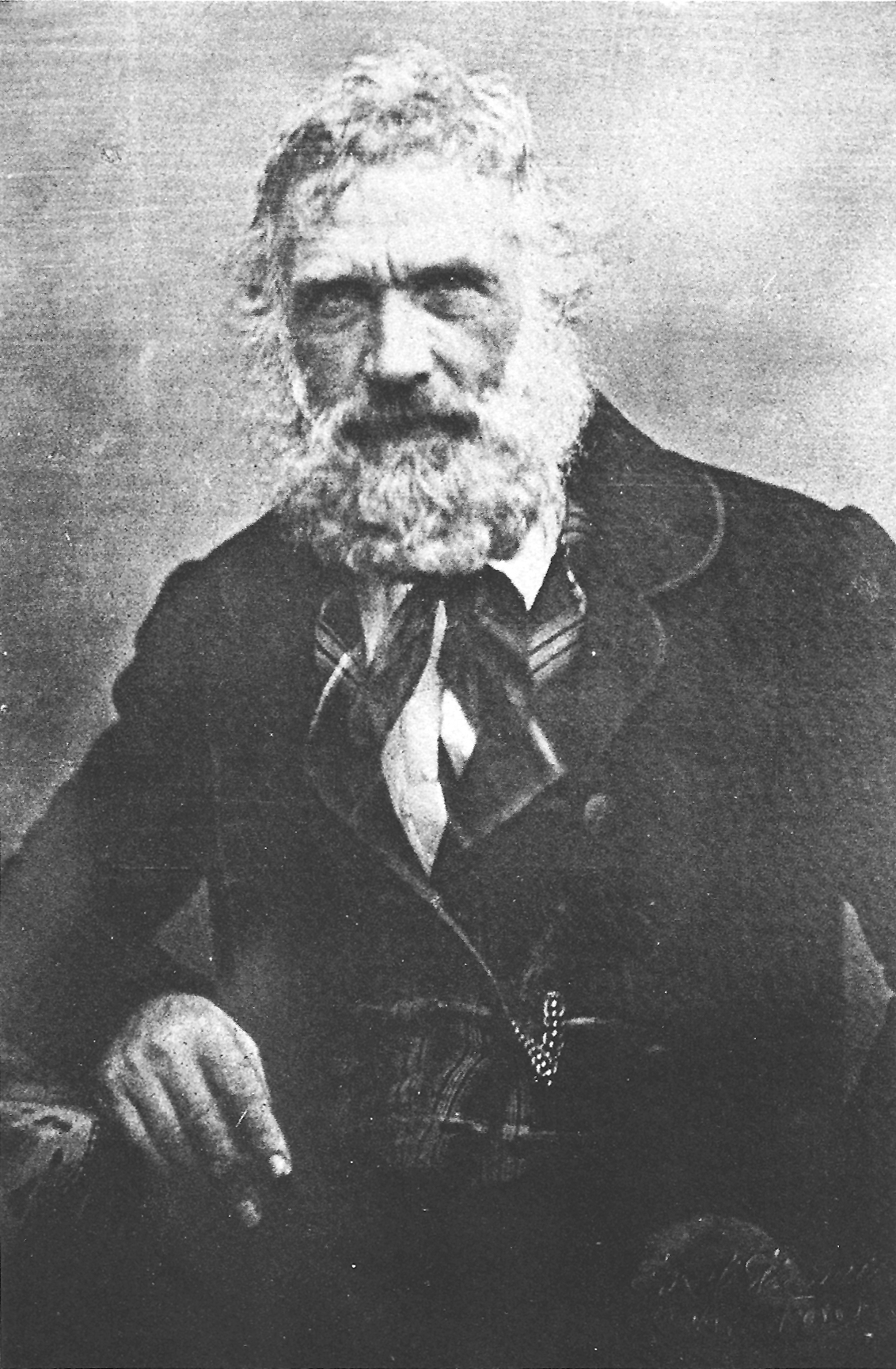
Johann Baptist Isenring born 12 May

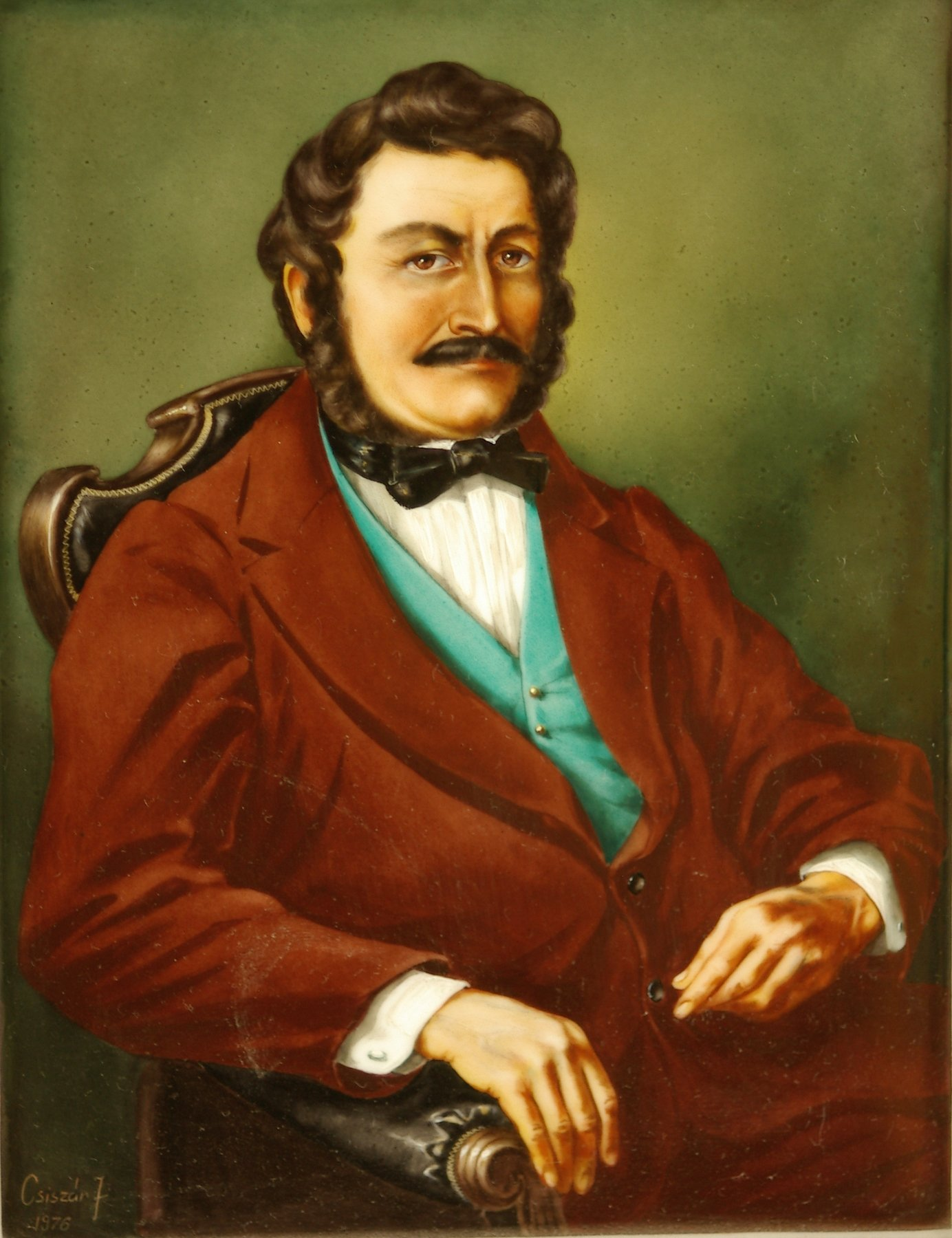
Vince Stingl born 23 May

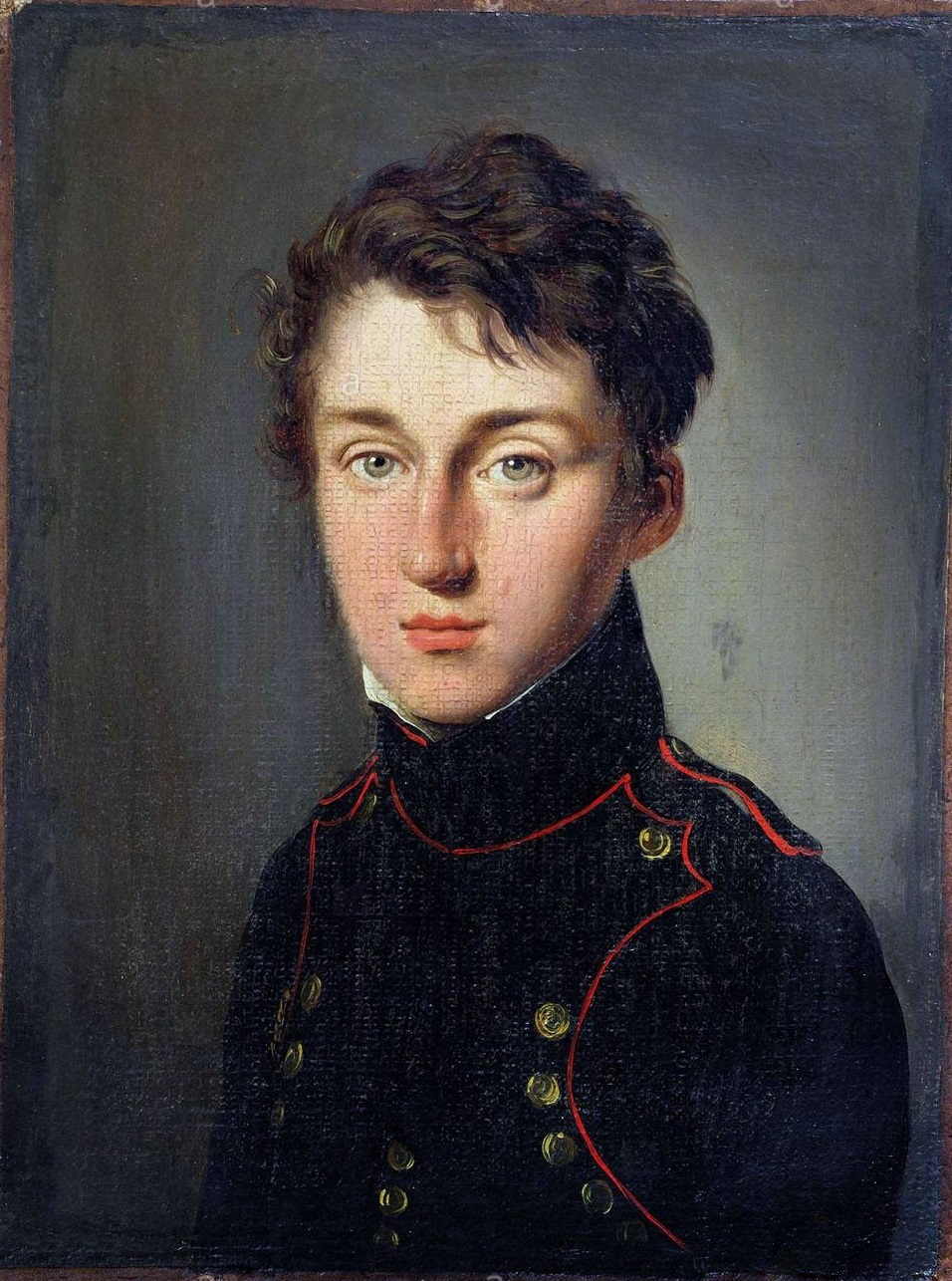
Nicolas Léonard Sadi Carnot born 1 June

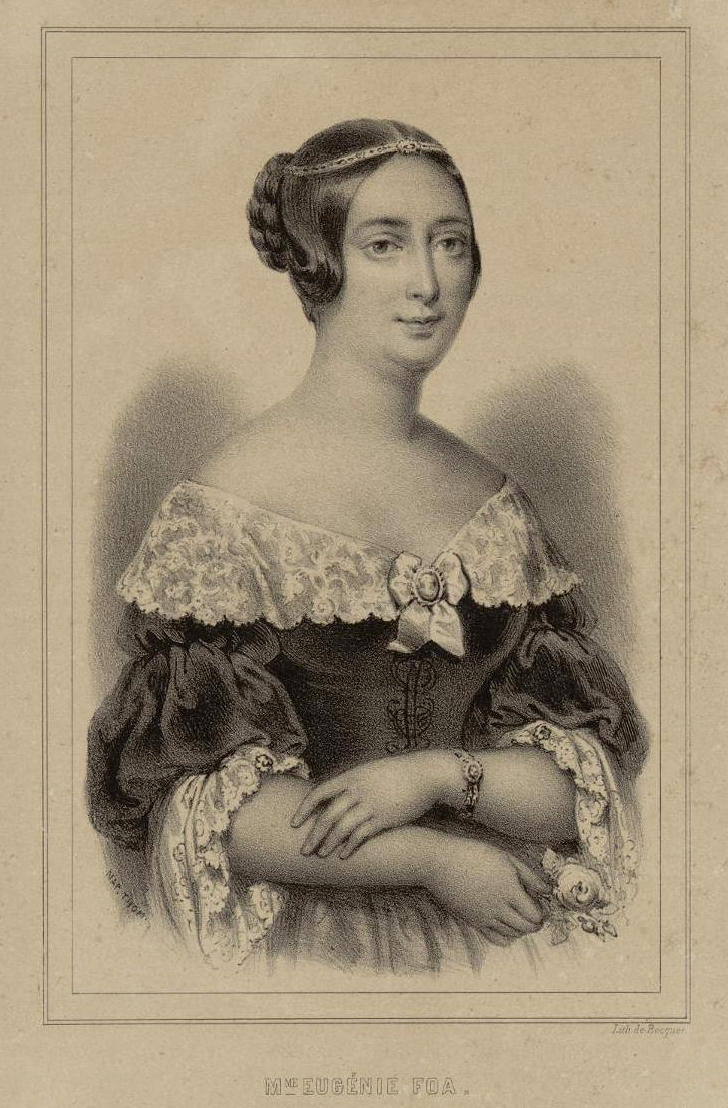
Eugénie Foa born 10 June

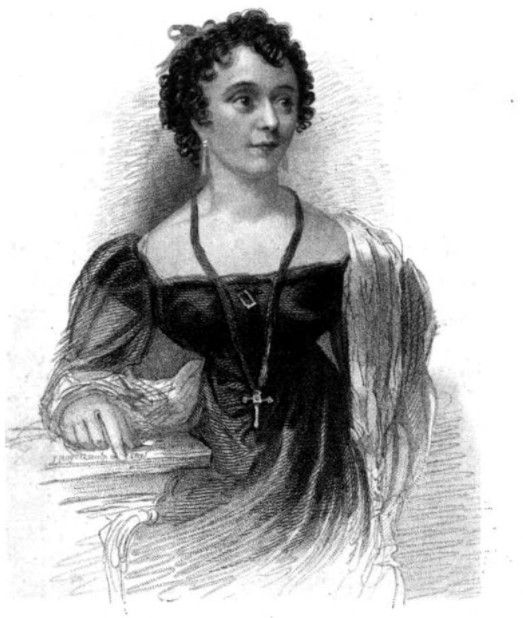
Mary Grimstone born 12 June

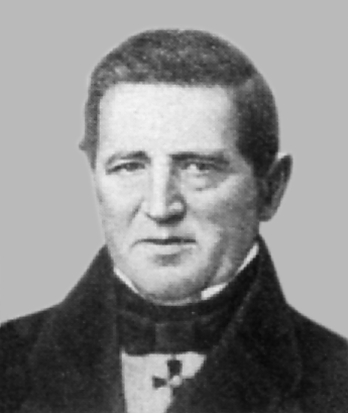
Nikolai Brashman born 14 June

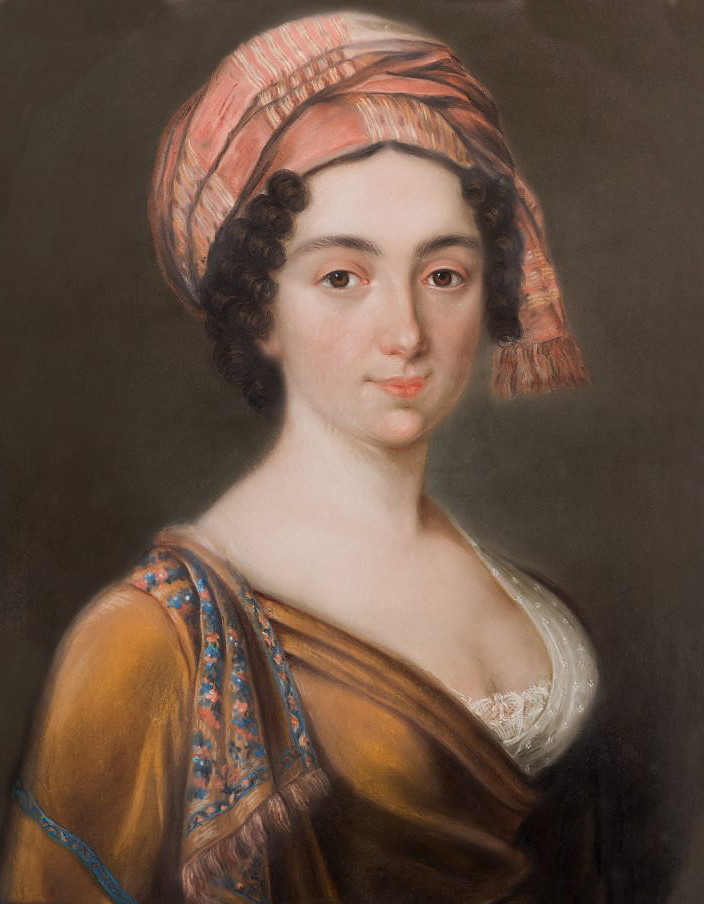
Mathilda d'Orozco born 14 June

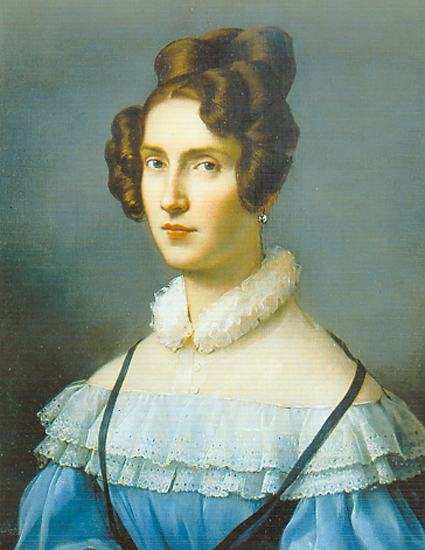
Carlotta Marchionni born 14 June

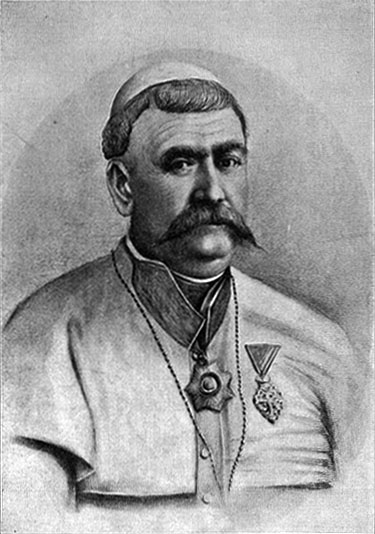
Rafael Barišić born 24 June

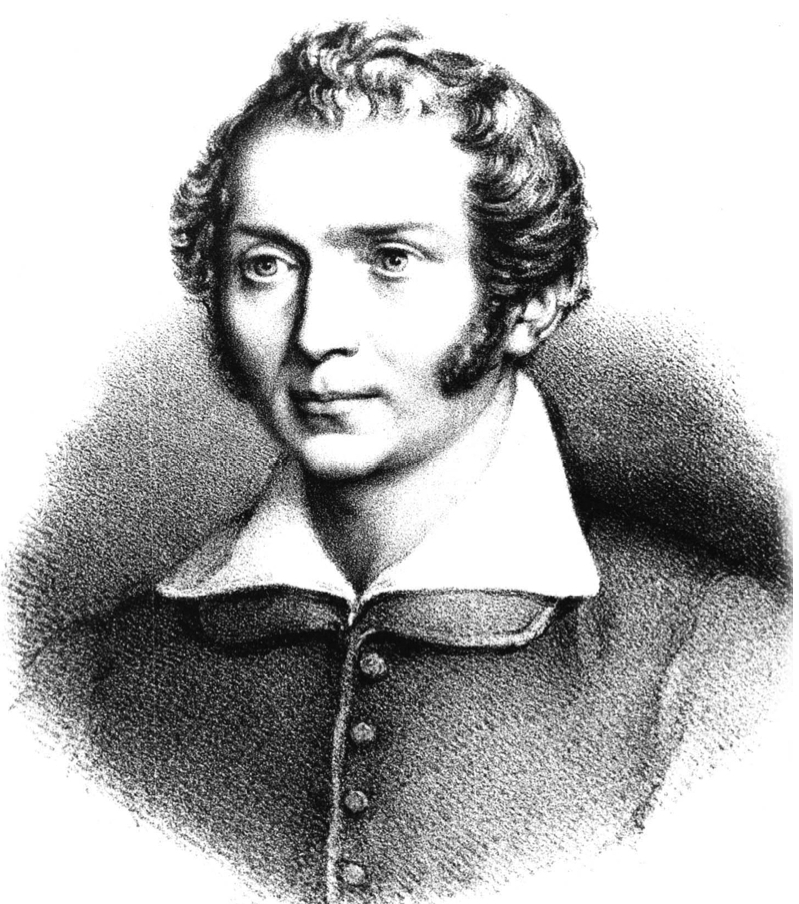
Ernst Mayer born 24 June

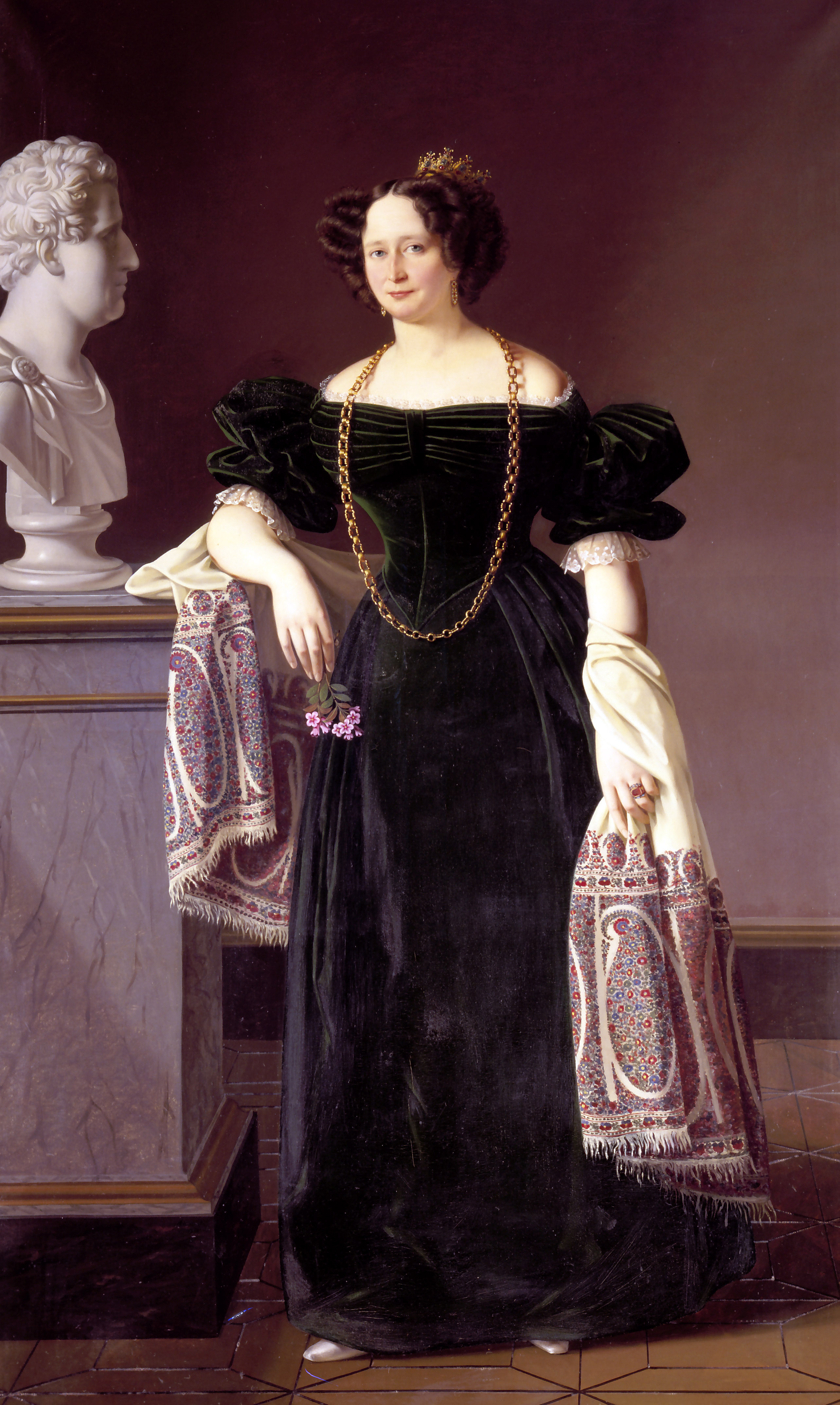
Caroline Amalie of Augustenburg born 28 June

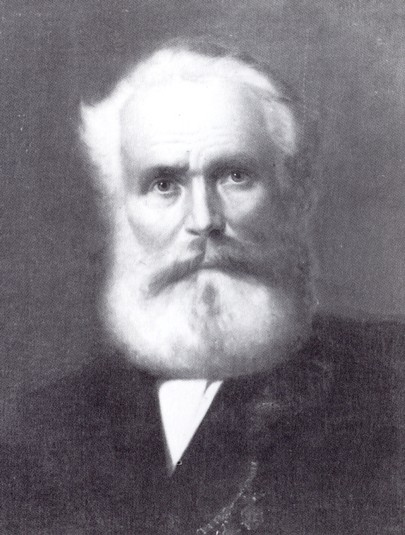
Michael Thonet born 2 July

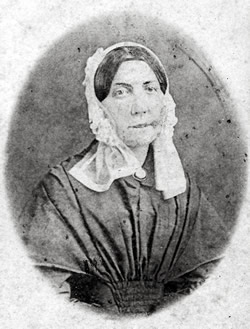
Maria Martin born 6 July

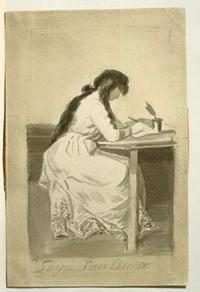
María Josefa García Granados born 10 July

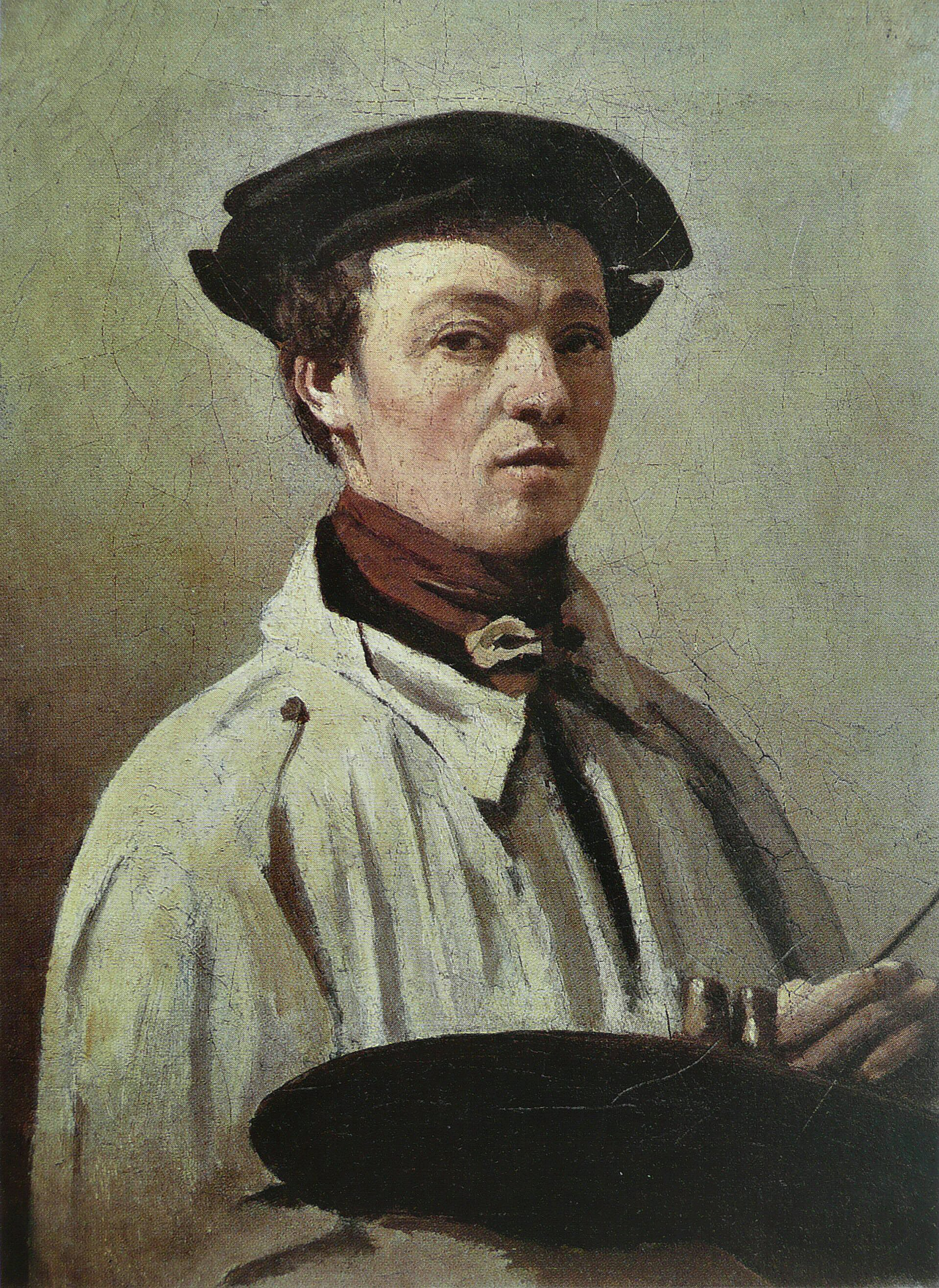
Jean-Baptiste-Camille Corot born 16 July

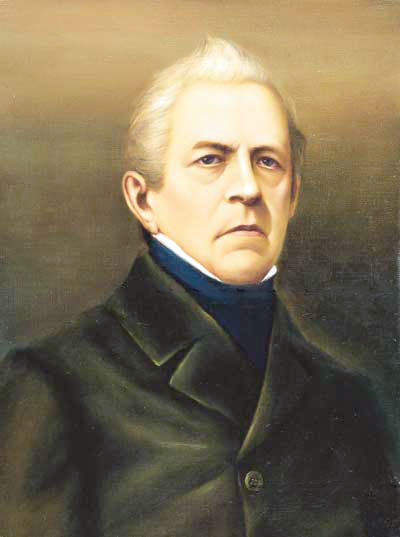
Franz Berwald born 23 July

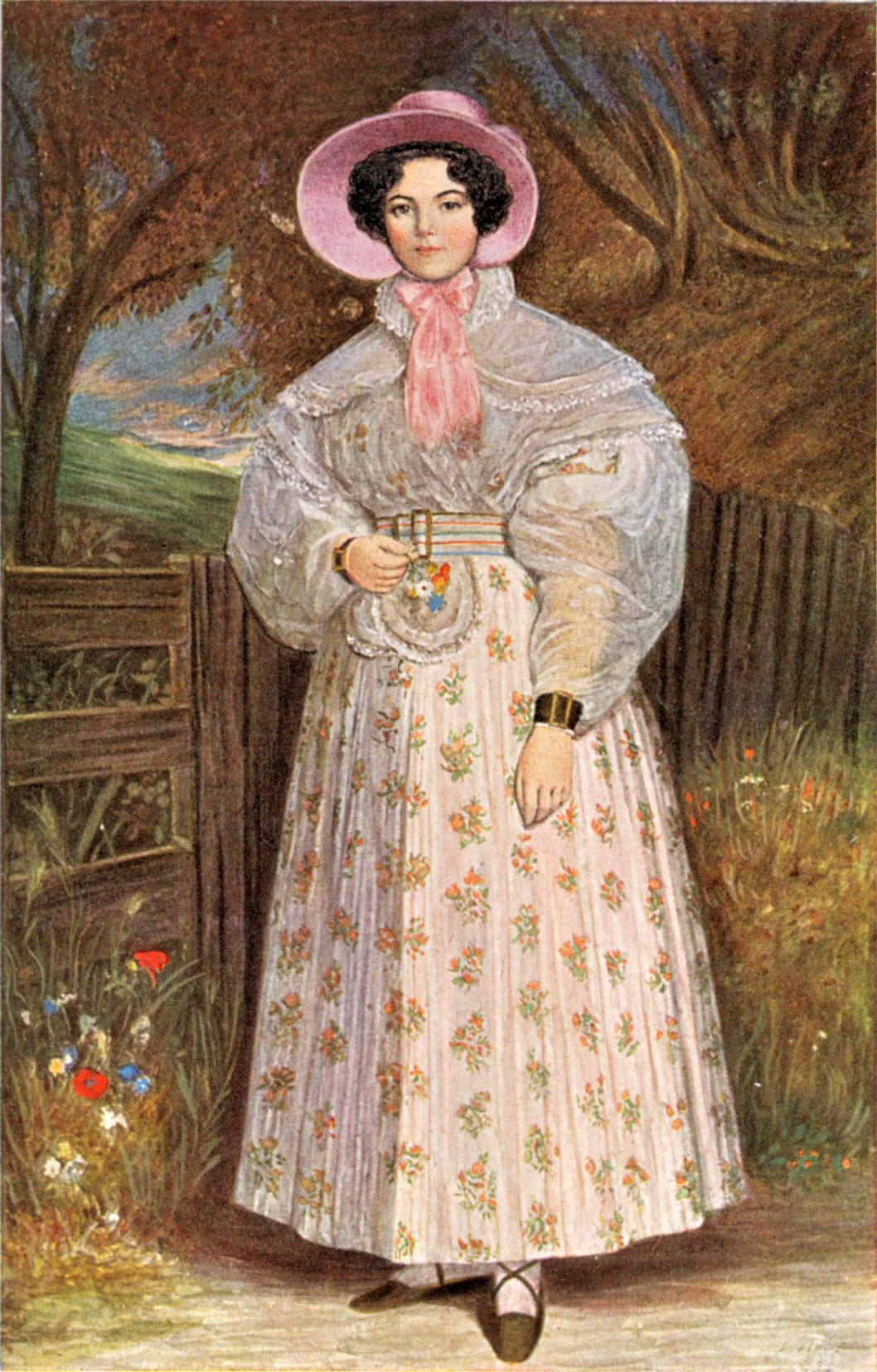
Lizinska de Mirbel born 26 July

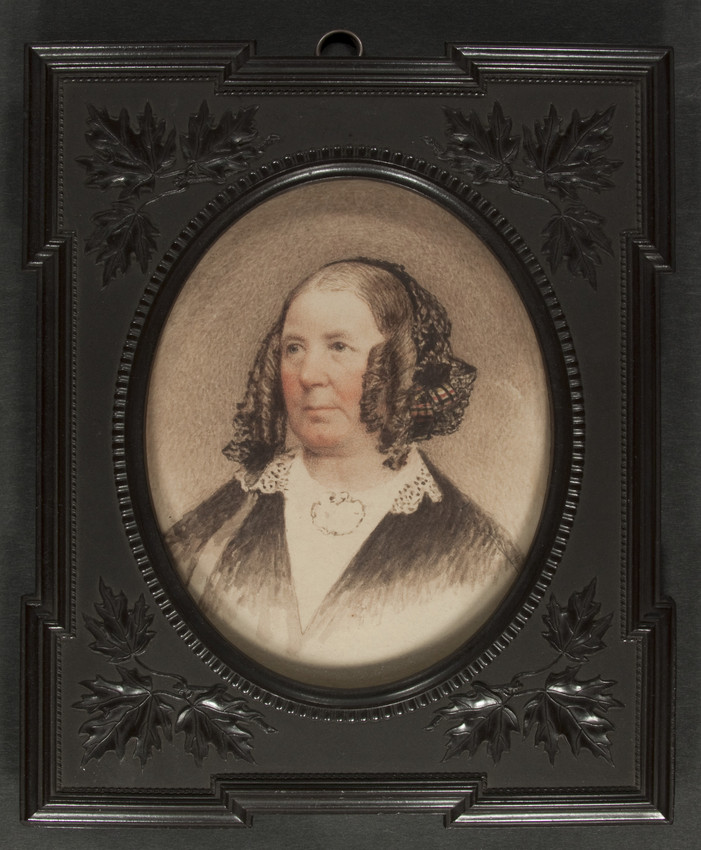
Eliza Henderson Boardman Otis born 27 July

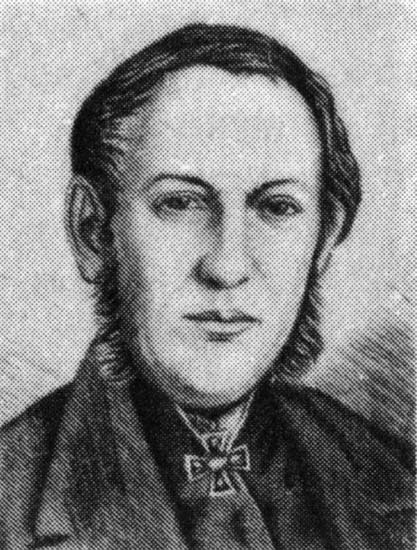
Pavel Stroyev born 27 July

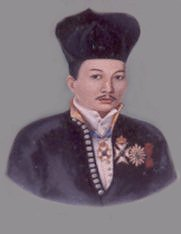
Pakubuwono VII born 28 July

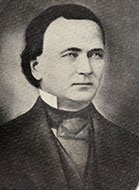
Walter Hunt born 29 July

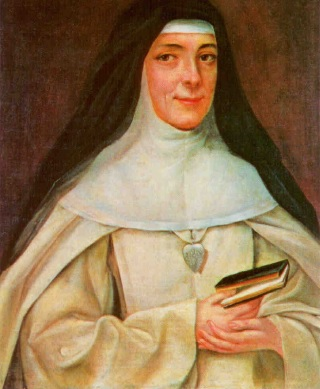
Mary Euphrasia Pelletier born 31 July

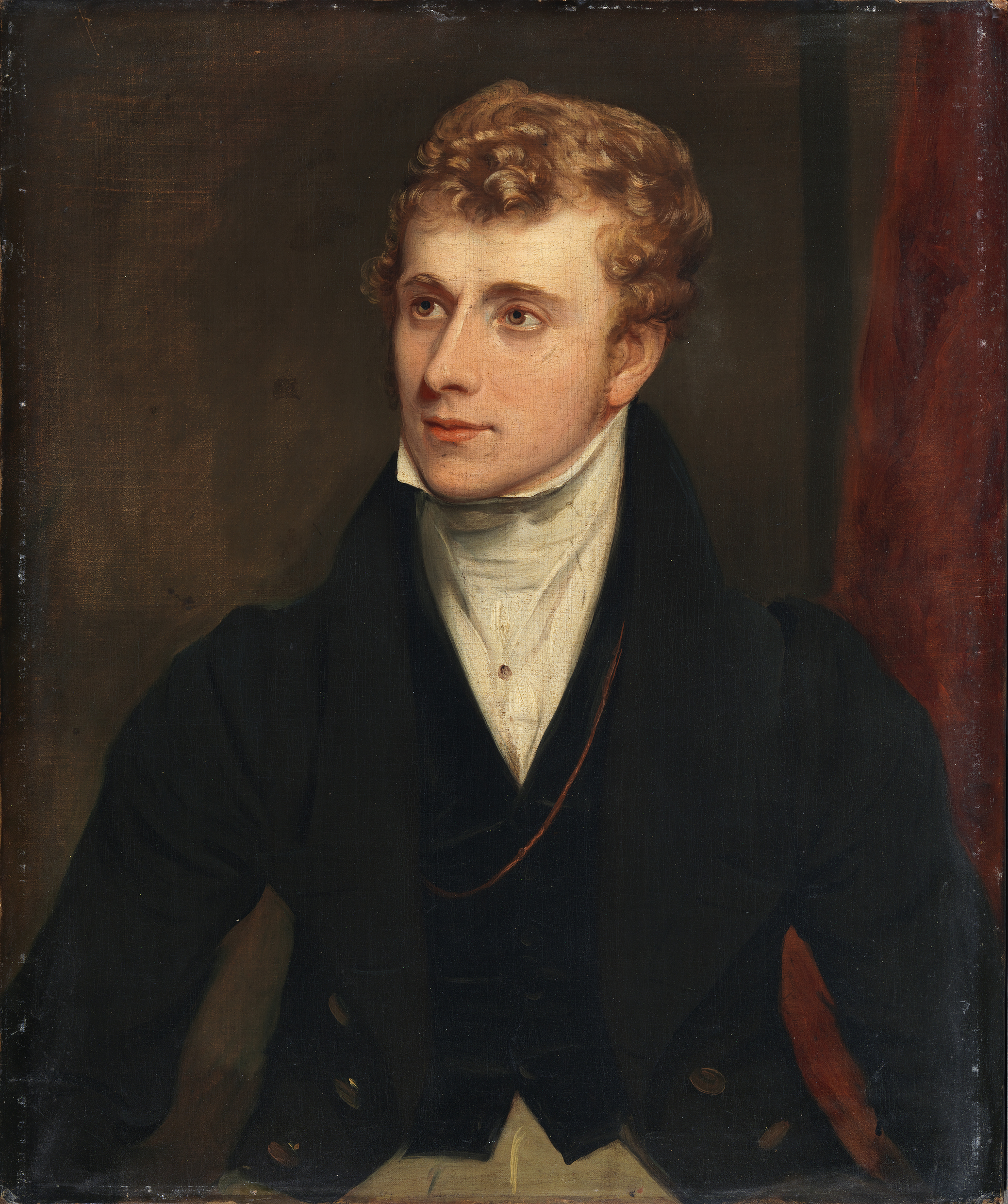
Michael Banim born 5 August

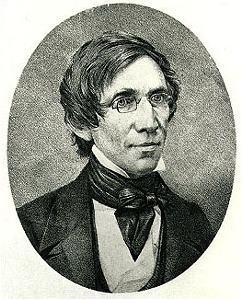
John Torrey born 15 August

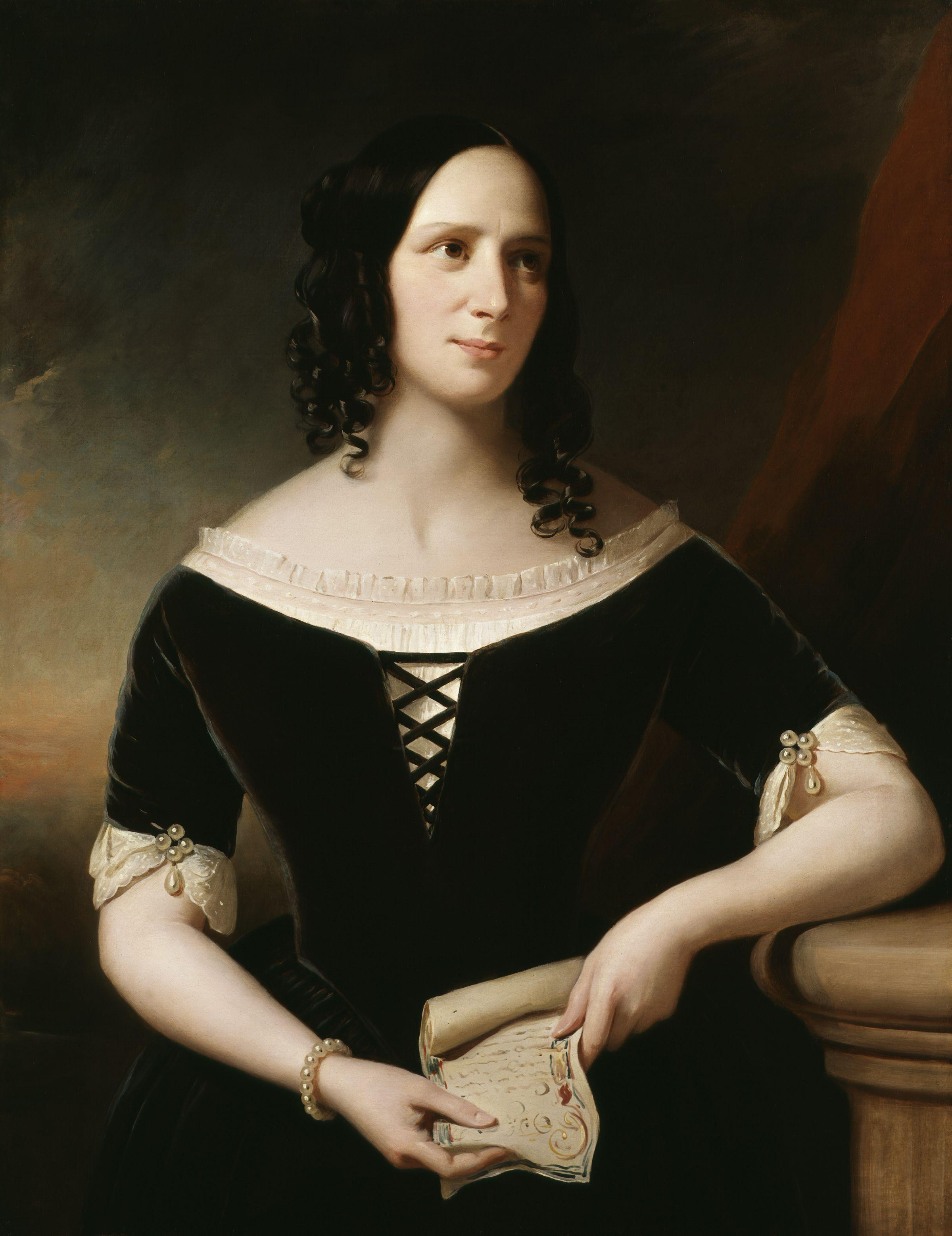
Agnes Strickland born 19 August

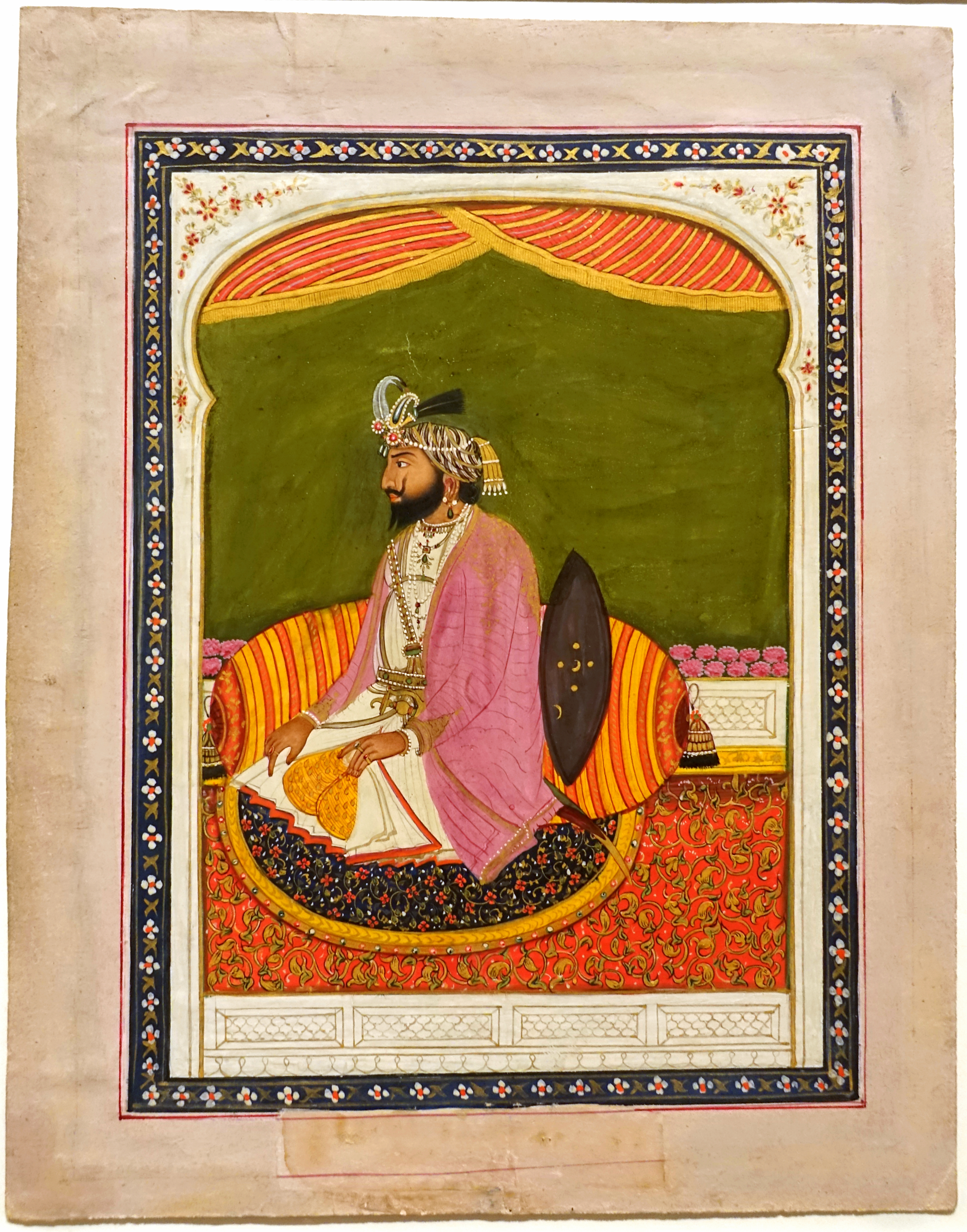
Dhian Singh born 22 August

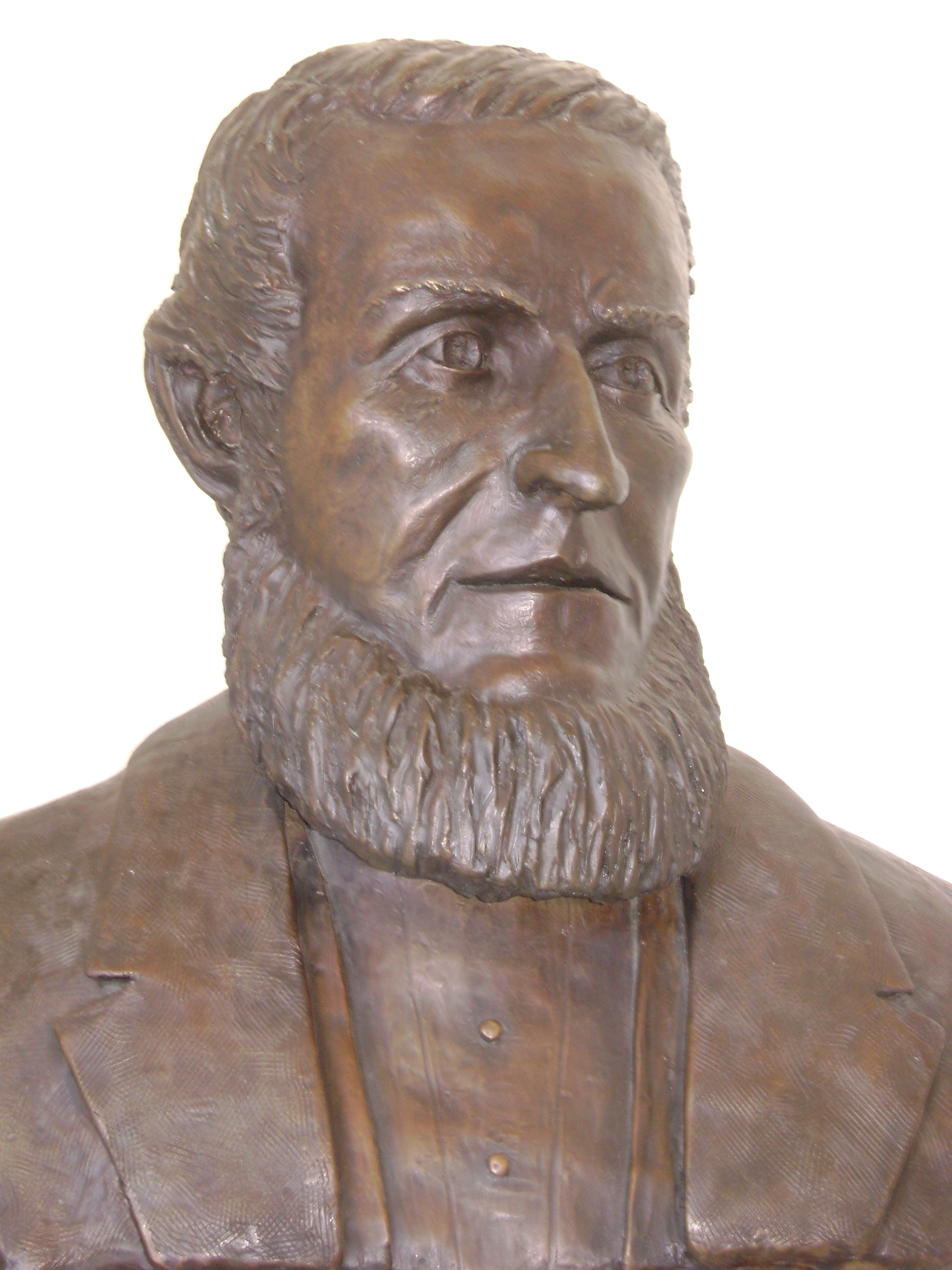
James Lick born 25 August

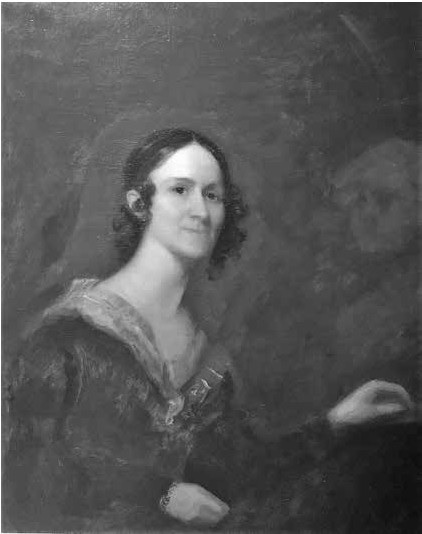
Joanna Quiner born 27 August

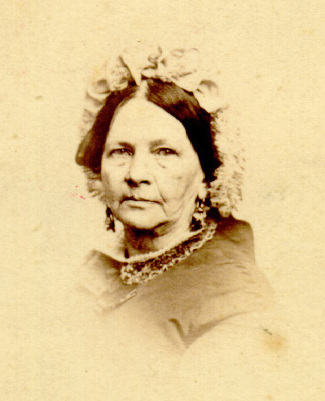
Sophia Smith (Smith College) born 27 August

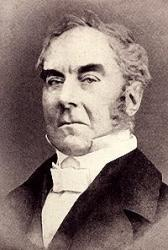
William Hiley Bathurst born 28 August

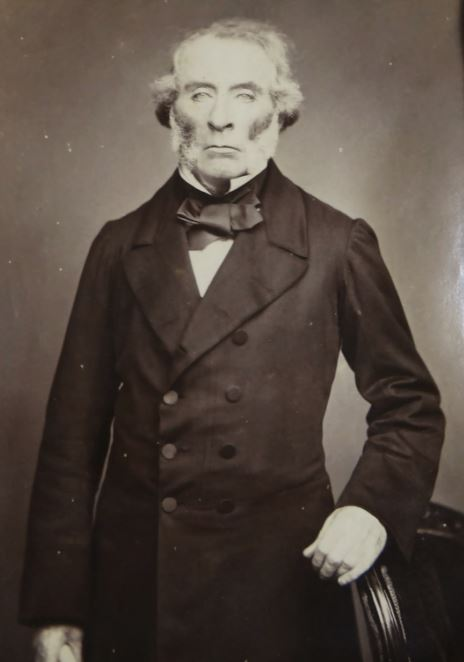
James Apjohn born 1 September

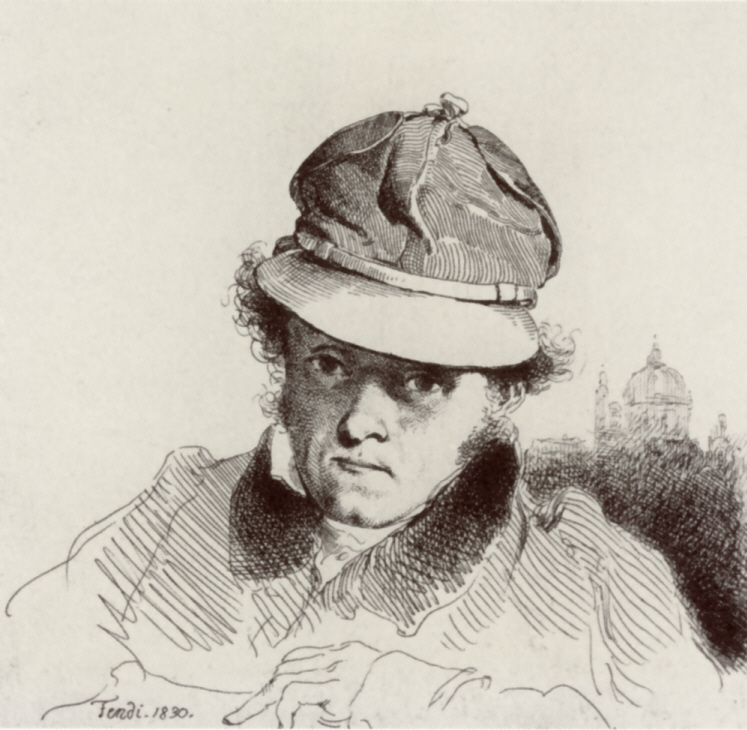
Peter Fendi born 4 September

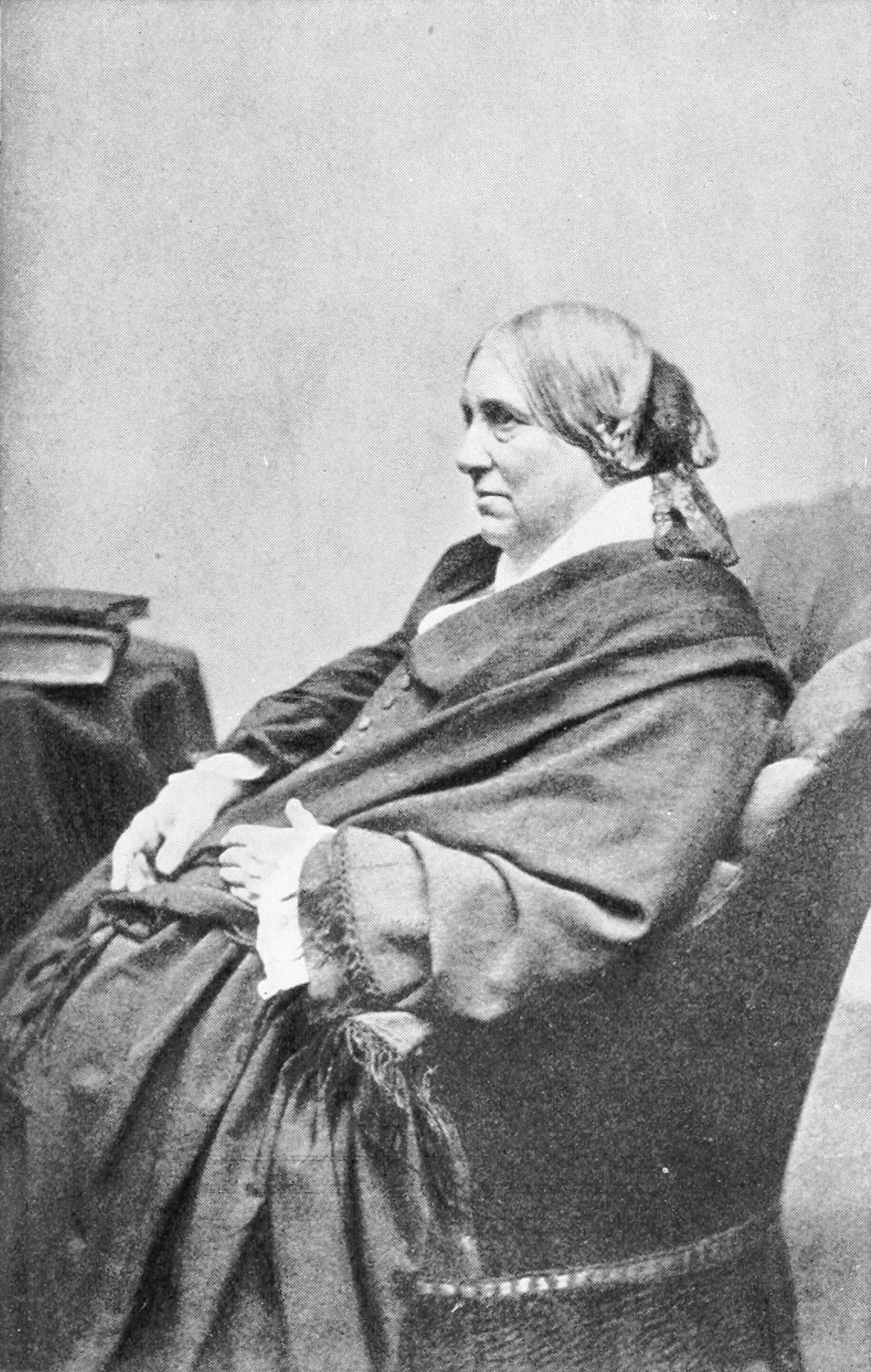
Sarah Preston Hale born 5 September

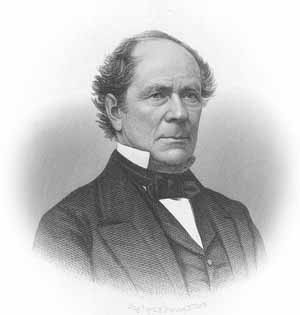
Uriel Crocker born 12 September

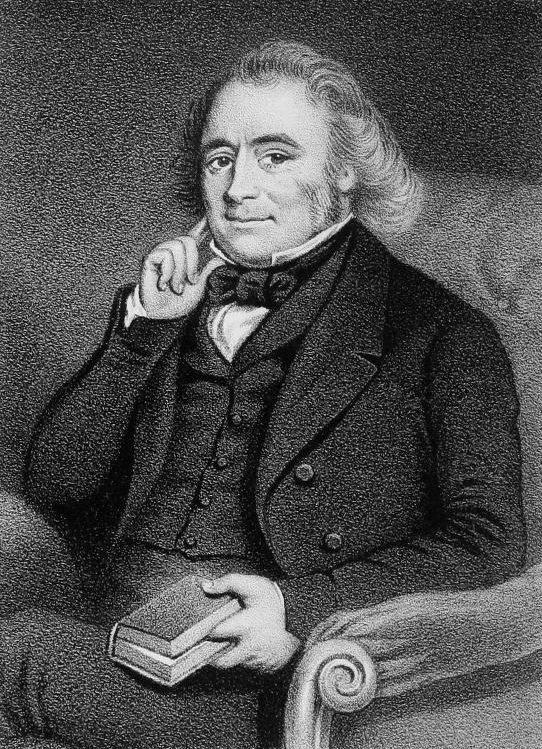
Hartley Coleridge born 19 September

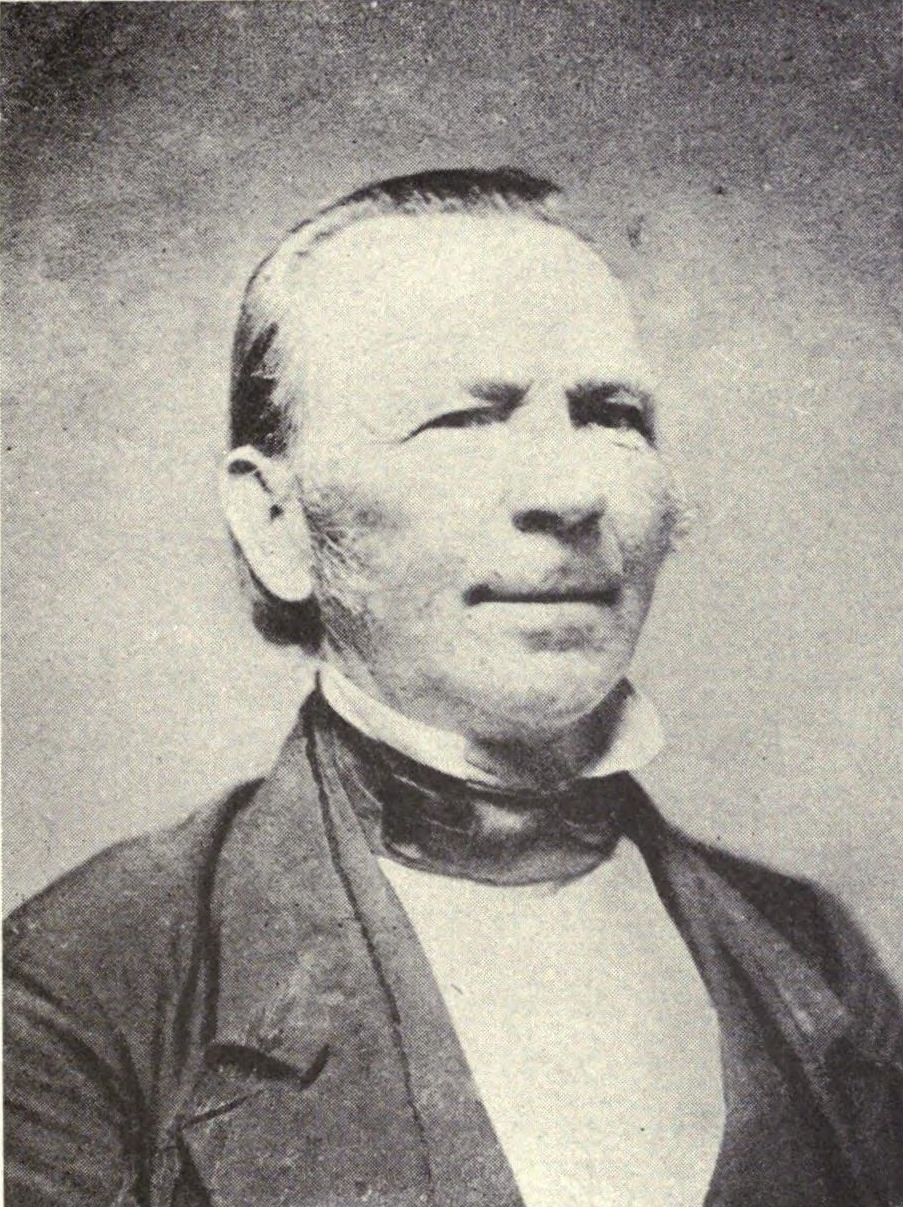
Jonathan Smith Green born 29 September

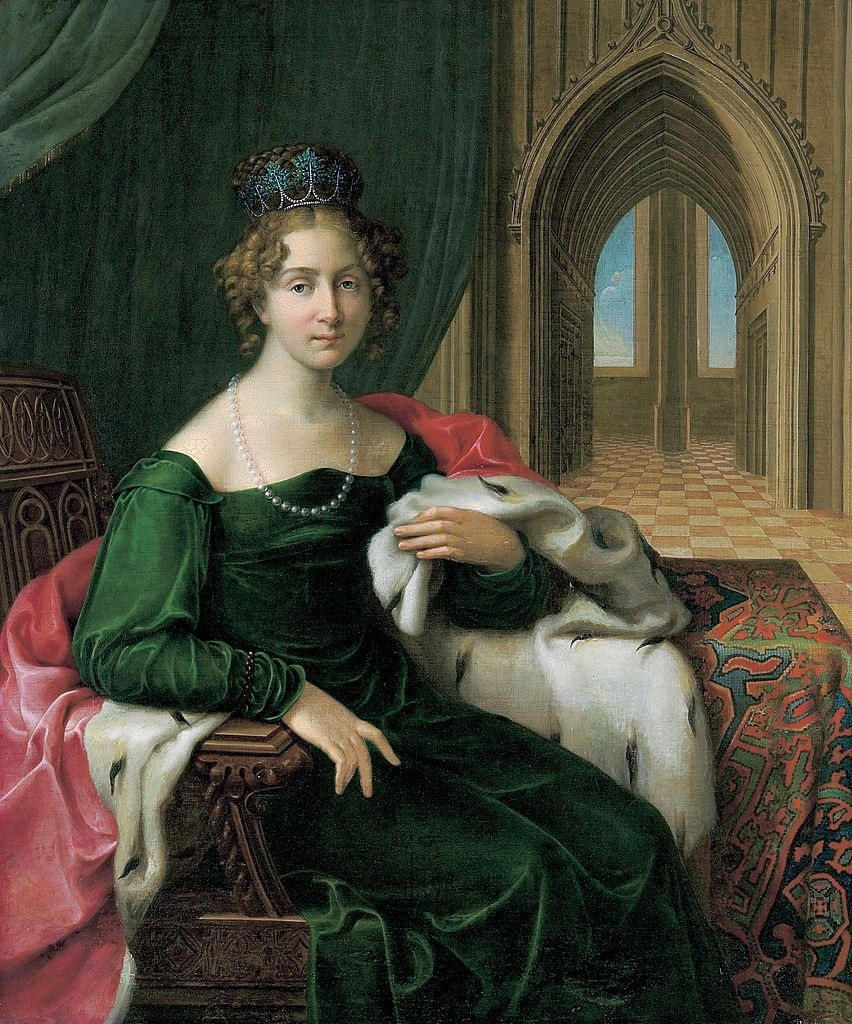
Princess Frederica of Prussia, Duchess of Anhalt-Dessau born 30 September

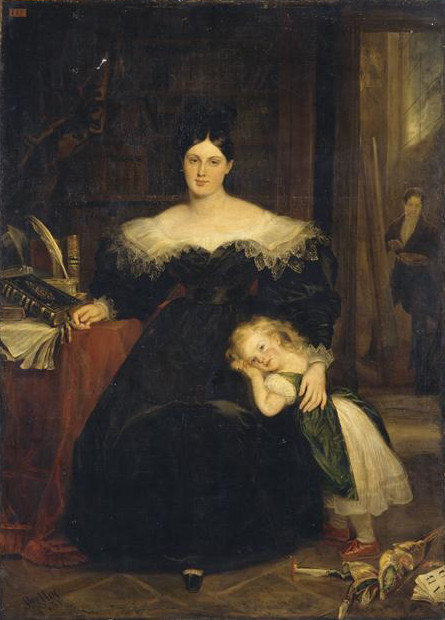
Louise Swanton Belloc born 1 October

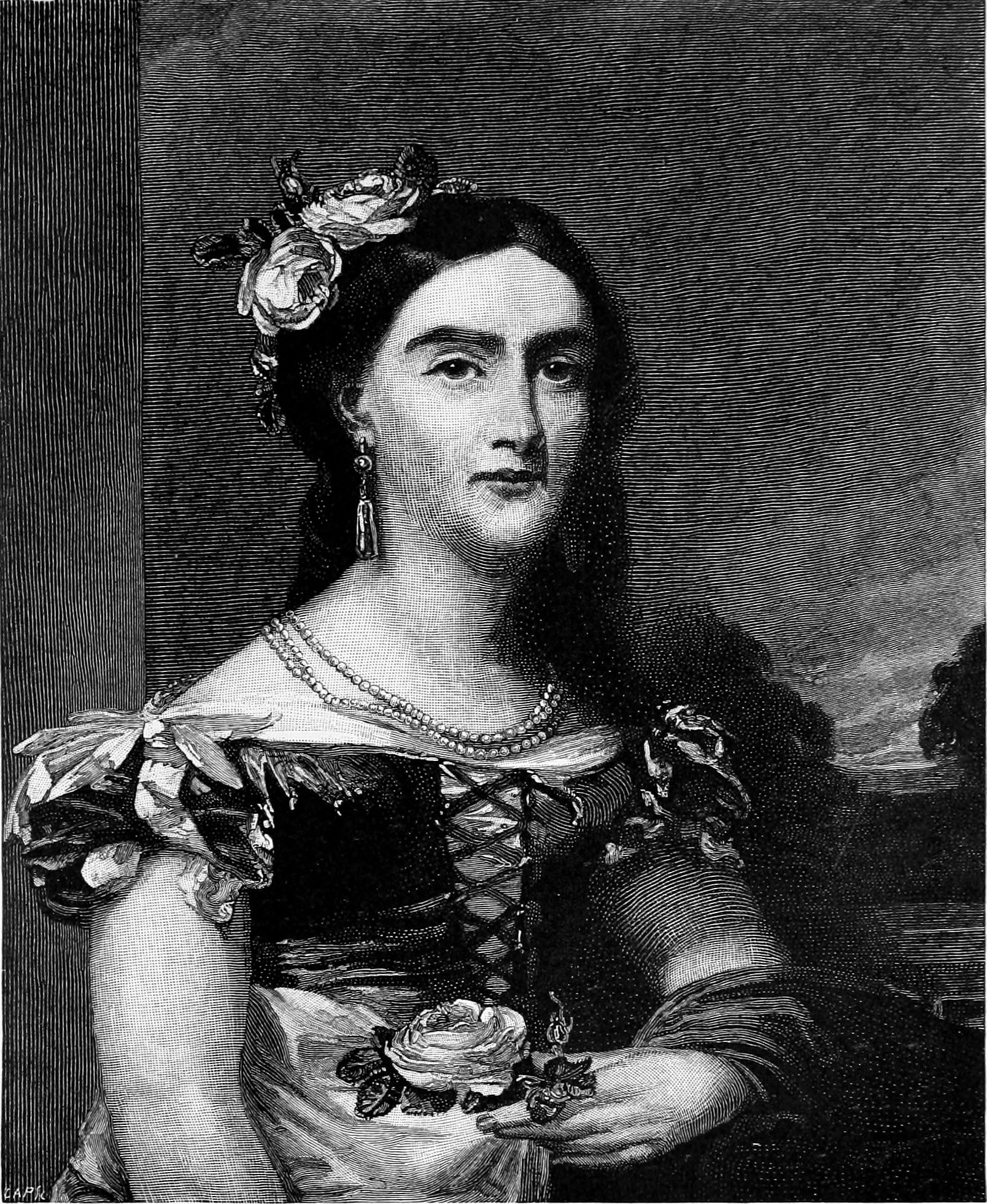
Cornelia Frances Jefferson born 1 October

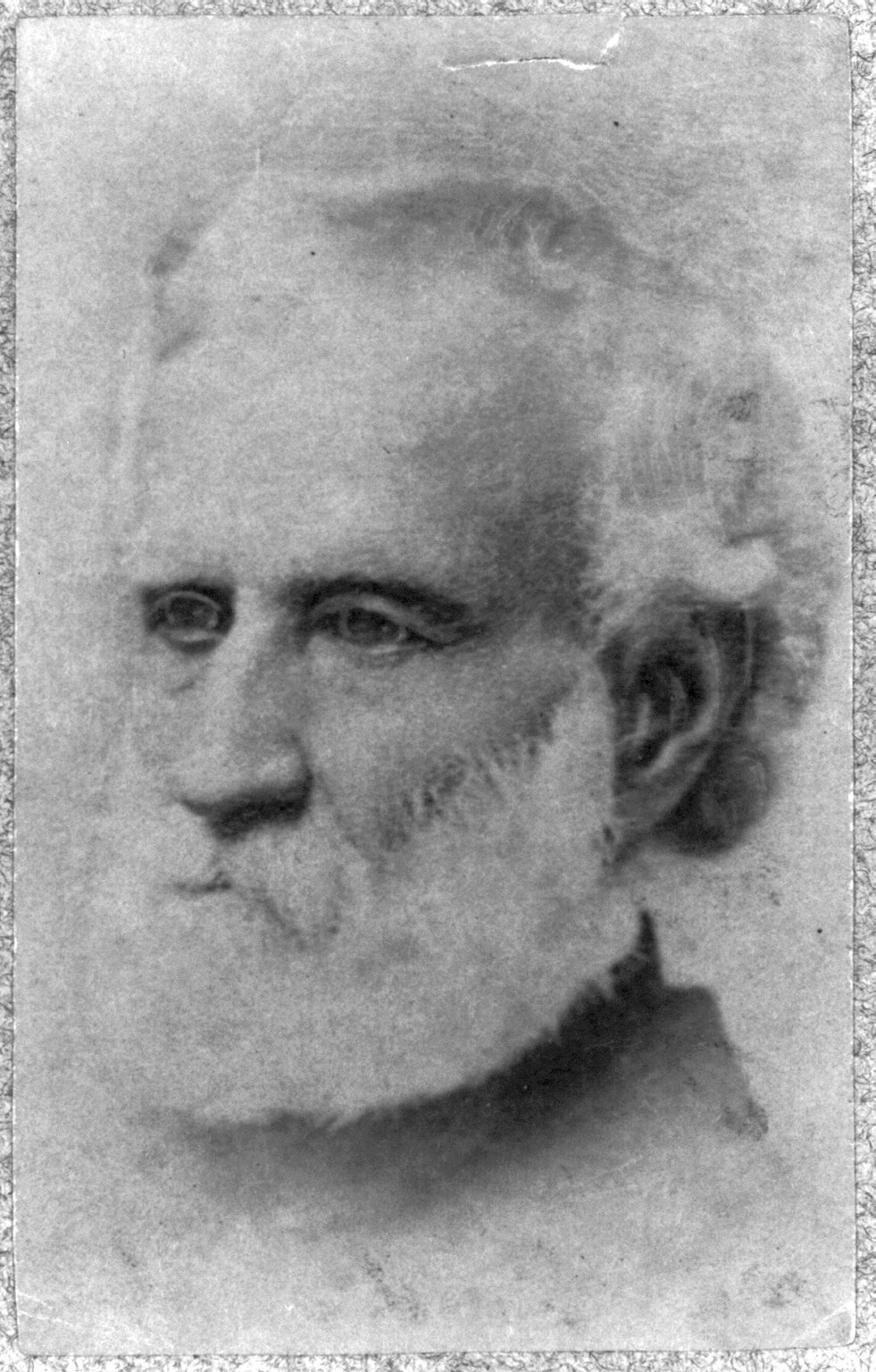
Thomas T. Fauntleroy (soldier) born 6 October

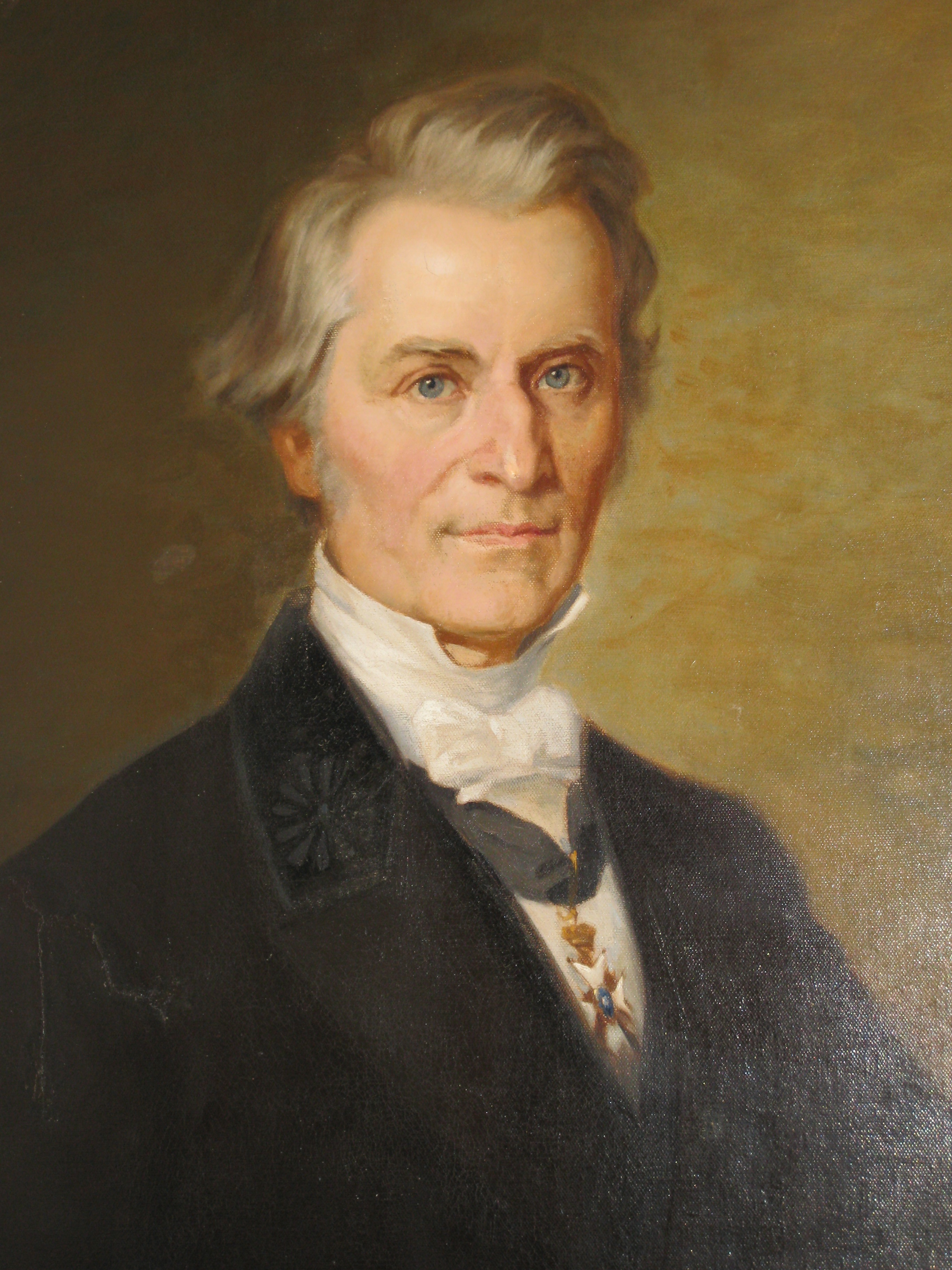
Anders Retzius born 13 October

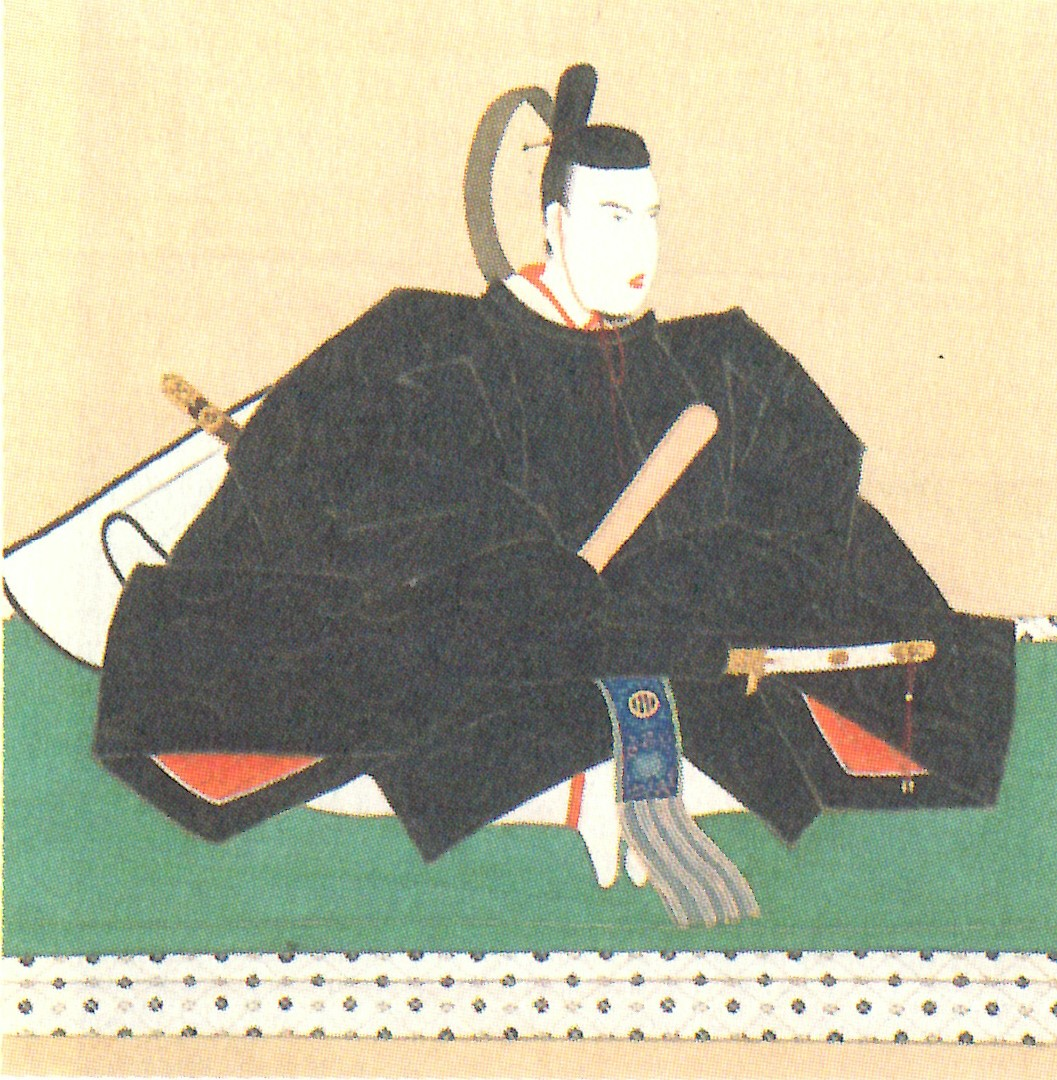
Date Narimune born 15 October

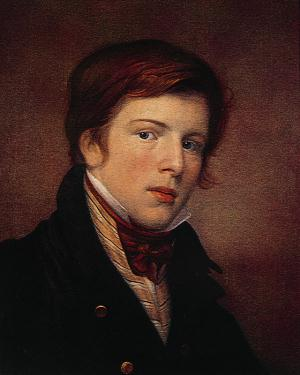
Leopold Kupelwieser born 17 October

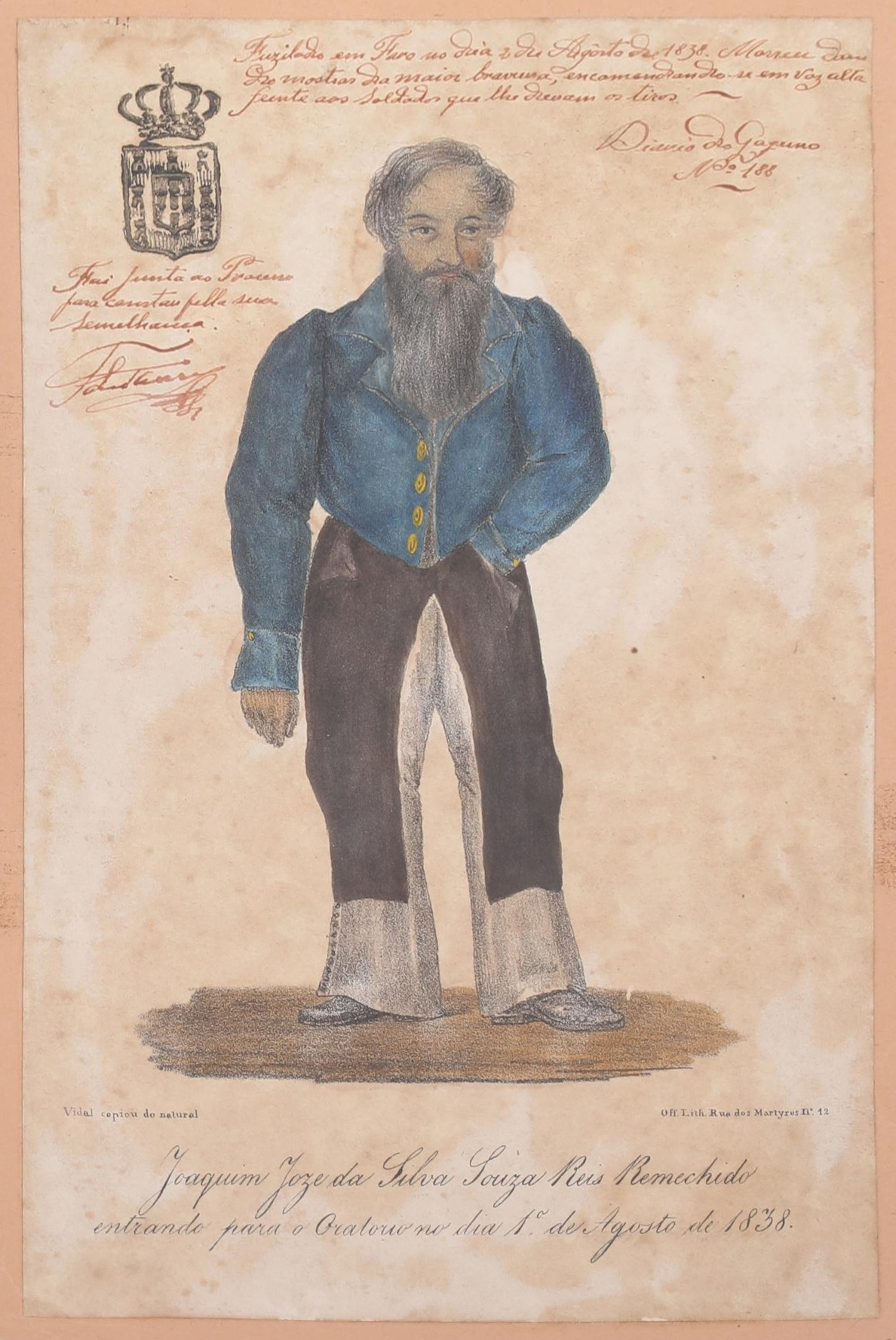
Remexido born 19 October

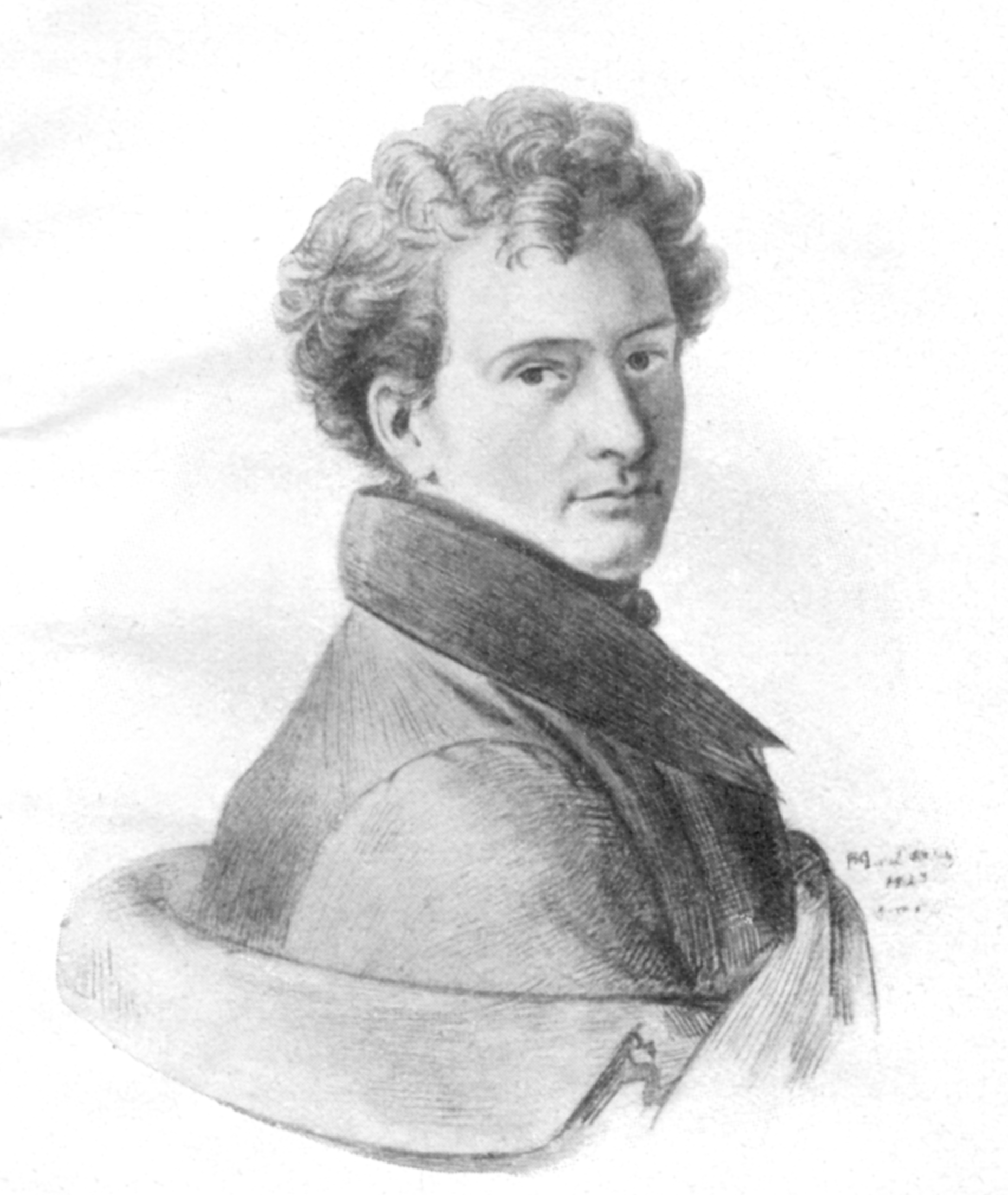
Gottfried Osann born 26 October

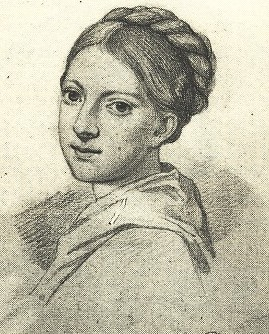
Ottilie von Goethe born 31 October

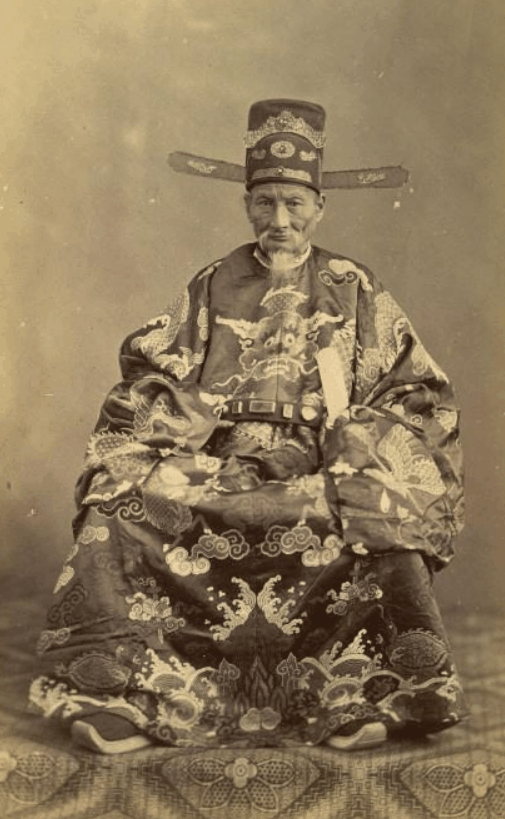
Phan Thanh Giản born 11 November

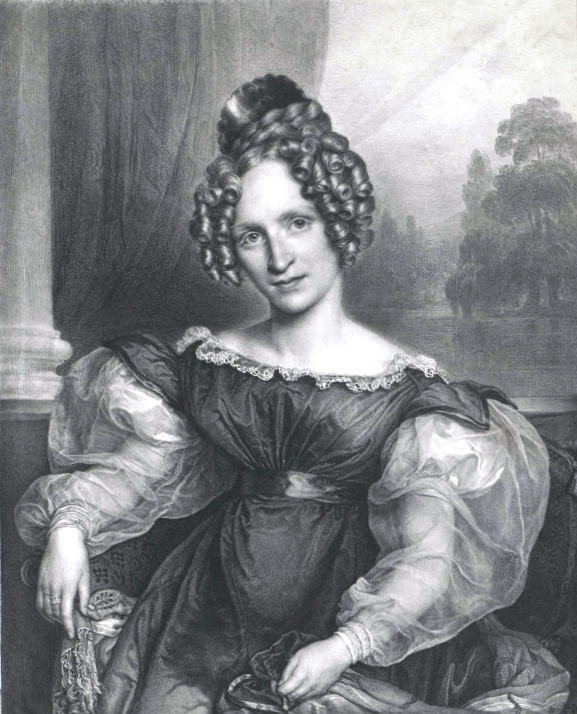
Friederike Funk born 14 November

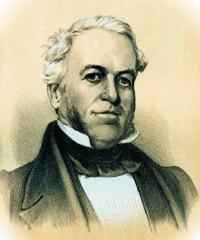
Henry Dangar born 18 November

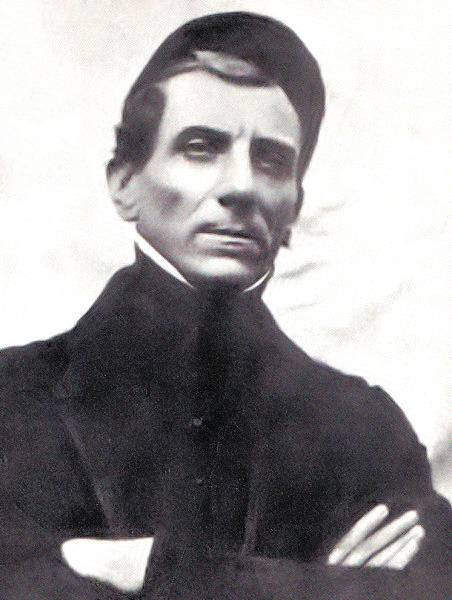
Stephan Ludwig Roth born 24 November

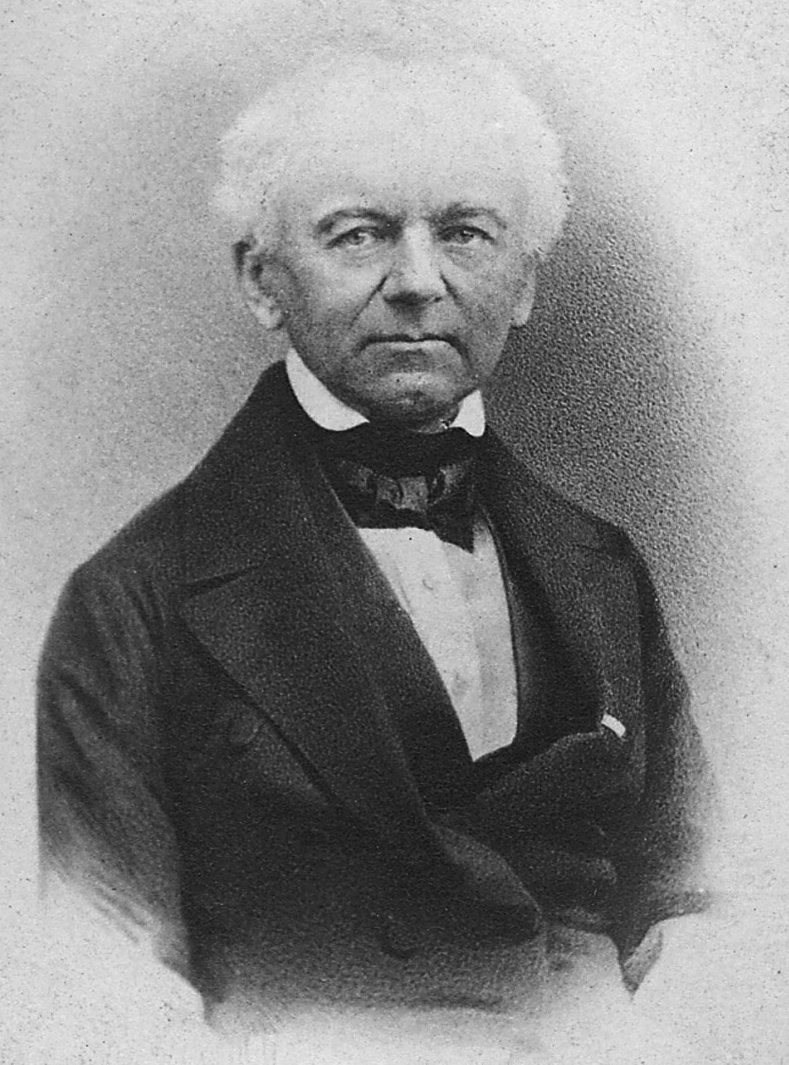
Andreas von Ettingshausen born 25 November

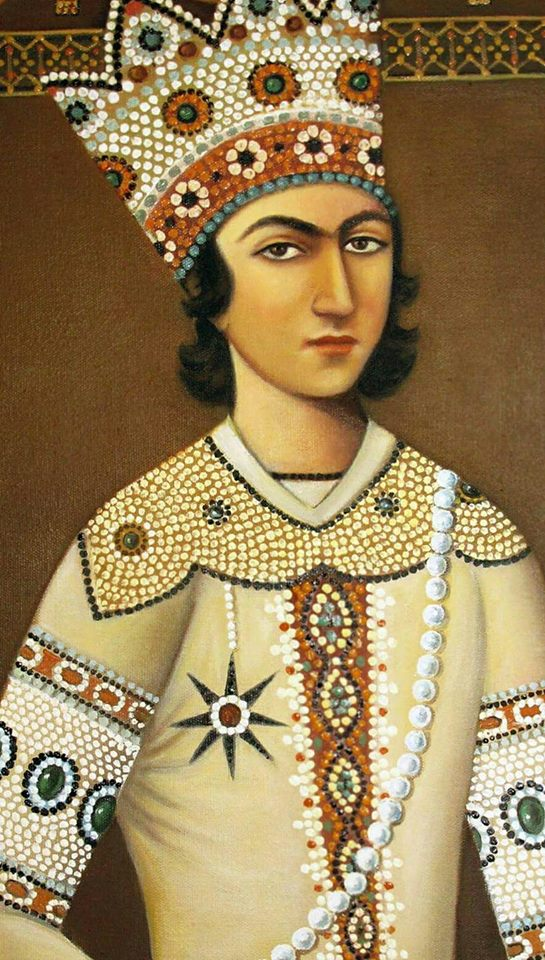
Abdollah Mirza Dara born 25 November

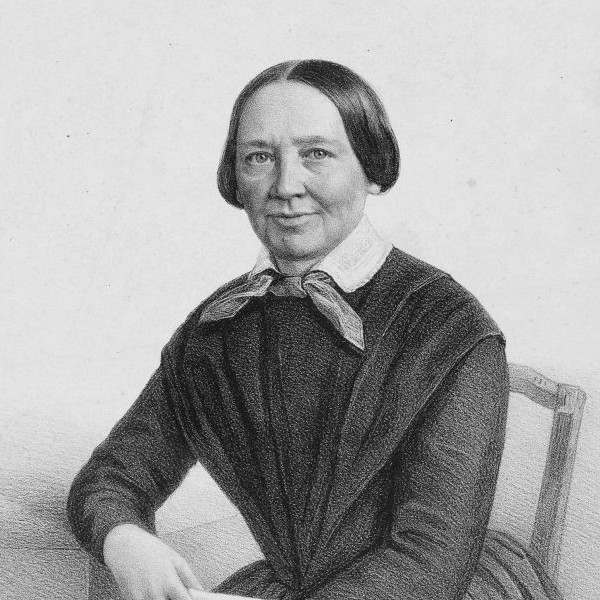
Emilie Zumsteeg born 9 December

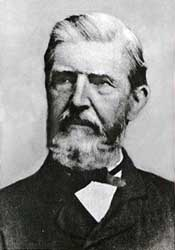
George Storrs born 13 December

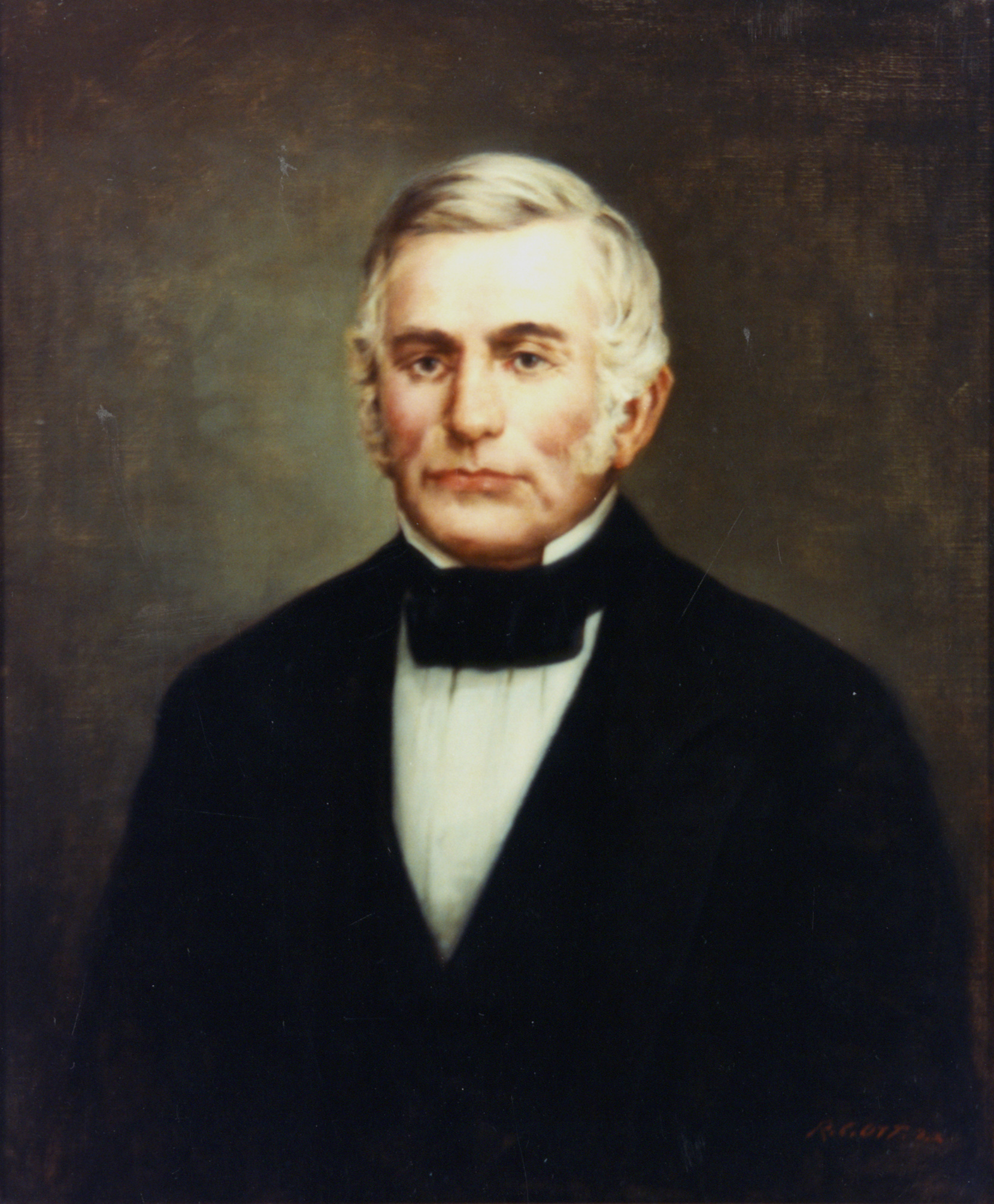
Lilburn Boggs born 14 December

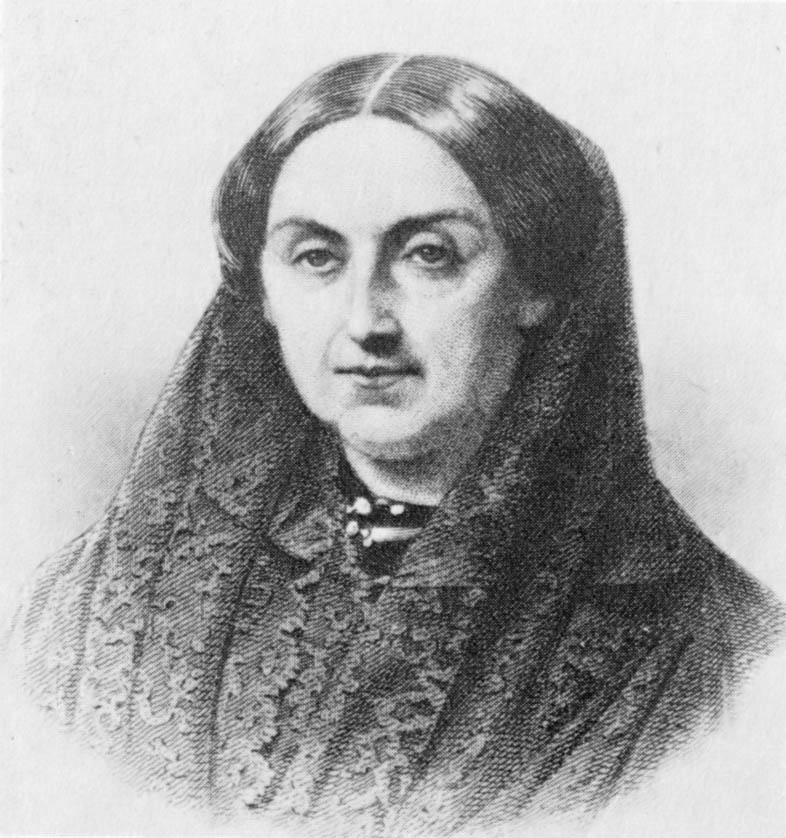
Fernán Caballero born 25 December

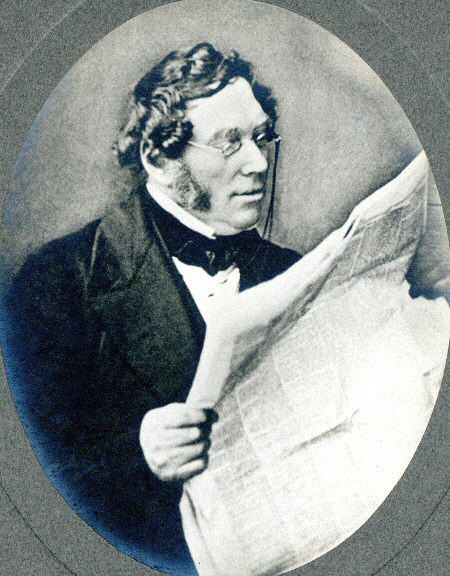
Hugh Lee Pattinson born 25 December

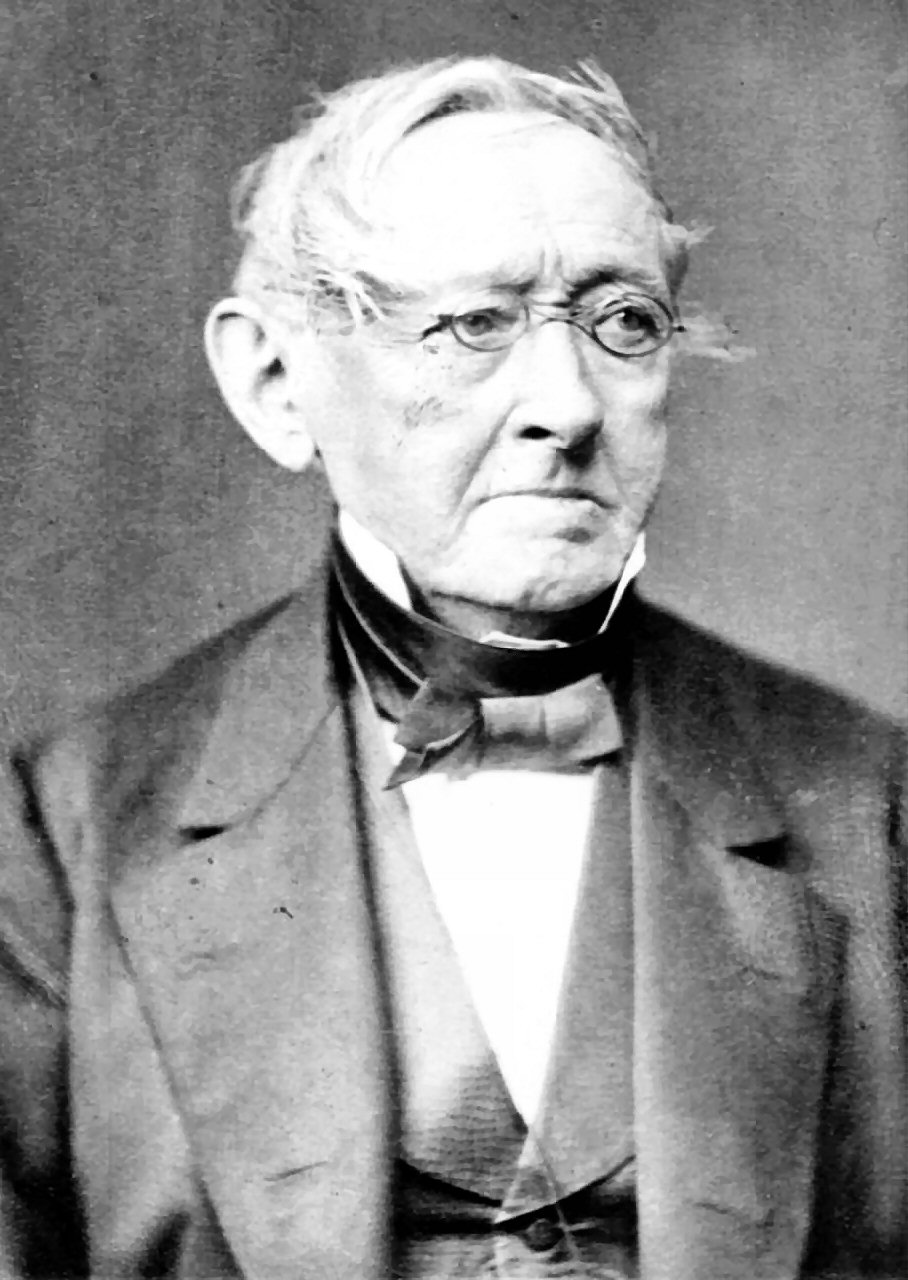
Johann Christian Poggendorff born 29 December

=== January ===
- January 1
  - Emily Baldwin, First Lady of Connecticut (d. 1863)
  - William Gross, criminal (d. 1823)
  - Felix Horetzky, Polish composer and guitarist (d. 1870)
  - Moritz Hermann Eduard Meier, German philologist (d. 1855)
- January 3
  - Milton Alexander, American general (d. 1856)
  - Henry Perceval, 5th Earl of Egmont, peer (d. 1841)
  - Johann Baptist Streicher, Austrian piano maker (d. 1871)
- January 4 – Henry George Bohn, British publisher (d. 1884)
- January 5
  - James Scarth Combe, British surgeon (d. 1883)
  - Jacques-Joseph Haus, lawyer (d. 1881)
  - Joseph Salvador, French scholar (d. 1873)
  - Julia Rush Cutler Ward, American poet (d. 1824)
- January 7
  - Peter Nead, German Baptist Brethren theologian (d. 1877)
  - Princess Charlotte of Wales, daughter and only child of future King George IV (d. 1817)
- January 8
  - Eliza Constantia Campbell, Welsh author (d. 1864)
  - Carl Friedrich Alexander Hartmann, German metallurgist (d. 1863)
- January 9 – Campbell Riddell, Australian public servant (d. 1858)
- January 10 – Leonard Dupont, French naturalist (d. 1828)
- January 12 – Paul Briquet, French physician (d. 1881)
- January 13 – Charles Shore, 2nd Baron Teignmouth, member of the United Kingdom Parliament (d. 1885)
- January 15
  - Pavel Liprandi, Russian military officer (d. 1864)
  - William Wagner, American philanthropist (d. 1885)
- January 16 – Robert Carrington, 2nd Baron Carrington, English army officer and politician (d. 1847)
- January 17
  - John Baker, namesake of the towns of Baker Lake and Baker Brook, New Brunswick, Canada (d. 1868)
  - Thaddeus Fairbanks, American inventor (d. 1886)
  - William Washington Gordon, American politician (d. 1842)
  - Alexander McLeod, Canadian sheriff (d. 1871)
- January 18
  - Charles de Brouckère, Belgian politician (d. 1860)
  - John Storer, merchant and philanthropist from Sanford (d. 1867)
  - John B. Terry, American businessman, soldier, and territorial legislator (d. 1874)
- January 19 – Gaspare Grasselini, Catholic cardinal (d. 1875)
- January 20 – Jacques-Marie-Adrien-Césaire Mathieu, French cardinal and author (d. 1875)
- January 21
  - Francisco Ferreira Drummond, Historian, paleographer, musician, politician (d. 1858)
  - Princess Marie of Hesse-Kassel, German princess and painter (d. 1880)
  - Jean-François Legendre-Héral, French sculptor (d. 1851)
- January 22 – Joseph Parkes, British politician (d. 1865)
- January 23
  - Karl Ernst Claus, Baltic-German chemist, naturalist (d. 1864)
  - George Francis Lyon, English naval officer and explorer (d. 1832)
  - Jean Reboul, French poet (d. 1864)
- January 24 – Nicolas Mori, British musician and publisher (d. 1839)
- January 25
  - William MacGillivray, British naturalist and ornithologist (d. 1852)
  - Samuel Stokely, American politician (d. 1861)
- January 28 – Nathaniel W. Watkins, Confederate Army general (d. 1876)
- January 29
  - Peter Joseph Elvenich, German theologian and philosopher (d. 1886)
  - Théobald de Lacrosse, French soldier and politician (d. 1865)
- January 30
  - James M. Elam, American politician (d. 1856)
  - Albert Gallup, American politician (d. 1851)
  - Jakob Sotriffer, Austrian sculptor (d. 1856)
  - John Ternouth, British artist (d. 1848)
- January 31
  - Anna Elisabeth Hartwick, Swedish lace industrialist (d. 1882)
  - Nathaniel Jocelyn, American artist (d. 1881)
  - Ebenezer Jackson Jr., American politician (d. 1874)
  - Wilhelm Gotthelf Lohrmann, German astronomer (d. 1840)
  - Christian Frederick Martin, American luthier (d. 1873)
  - Alfred Inigo Suckling, British antiquarian (d. 1856)

=== February ===
- February 1 – Abraham Emanuel Fröhlich, Swiss poet (d. 1865)
- February 2
  - François Vincent Latil, French painter (d. 1890)
  - William Richardson, British astronomer (d. 1872)
  - Henry Wyllys Taylor, American judge (d. 1888)
- February 3
  - Peter Ihrie Jr., American politician (d. 1871)
  - Jean-Baptiste Madou, lithographer, painter (d. 1877)
- February 4
  - Erasmus Engert, Austrian painter and restorer (d. 1871)
  - William Nanson Lettsom, British man of letters (d. 1815)
- February 5
  - Pieter Godfried Bertichen, Dutch painter (d. 1856)
  - Nicholas H. Cobbs, American bishop (d. 1861)
  - Johannes von Geissel, Catholic cardinal (d. 1864)
  - Morris Ketchum, American railway entrepreneur (d. 1880)
  - Léon Talabot, French engineer and politician (d. 1863)
- February 6
  - John Stevens Henslow, British botanist, priest and geologist (d. 1861)
  - Alfred Lyall, English philosopher, editor, clergyman and traveller (d. 1865)
- February 7
  - José da Costa Carvalho, Marquis of Monte Alegre, Brazilian politician (d. 1860)
  - Thomas Gregson, 2nd Premier of Tasmania, Australia (d. 1874)
  - Marie-Françoise Perroton, French nun (d. 1873)
- February 8
  - Barthélemy-Prosper Enfantin, one of the founders of Saint-Simonianism (d. 1864)
  - George Washington Toland, American politician (d. 1869)
- February 9
  - Samuel M. Moore, American politician (d. 1875)
  - Thomas Tucker, English first-class cricketer (d. 1832)
- February 10
  - Henry De la Beche, English geologist and palaeontologist (d. 1855)
  - Henry Venn, English mission society administrator (d. 1873)
- February 11
  - John MacDonnell, Irish surgeon and pioneer of surgical anaesthesia in Ireland (d. 1892)
  - John Pontifex, English cricketer (d. 1875)
- February 12
  - Hiram Capron, Founder of the town of Paris, Ontario (d. 1872)
  - Thomas Close, English antiquarian (d. 1881)
  - Damián Domingo, Filipino painter (d. 1834)
  - Henry Dutton, American politician (d. 1869)
  - Benoît-Philibert Perroud, French entomologist (d. 1878)
- February 13
  - Hiram F. Mather, American politician (d. 1868)
  - Adam Norrie, Scottish-American merchant (d. 1882)
  - Henry Sargant Storer, British artist (d. 1837)
- February 14
  - Valentín Carderera, Spanish painter (d. 1880)
  - William Michell, English physician and politician (d. 1872)
  - Poul Pagh, Danish merchant and ship owner (d. 1870)
  - Robert Young, Hawaiian chief (d. 1813)
- February 15
  - Pyotr Anjou, arctic explorer and admiral of Russian Navy (d. 1869)
  - Ali Mirza Zel as-Soltan, pretender to the throne of Qajar Iran (d. 1854)
- February 16
  - Felix Tollemache, British politician (d. 1843)
  - Samuel Charles Whitbread, British politician (d. 1879)
- February 17
  - Louis Eugène Marie Bautain, French philosopher and theologian (d. 1867)
  - Frederick William Beechey, English naval officer and hydrographer (d. 1856)
  - Roswell Bottum, American politician (d. 1877)
  - Robert Milham Hartley, co-founder of the temperance movement in New York (d. 1881)
  - Giovanni Pacini, Italian composer (d. 1867)
  - Philipp Franz von Siebold, German physician, botanist and explorer (d. 1866)
- February 18
  - John Bell, American lawyer and politician (d. 1869)
  - Andreas Christian Møller, Norwegian teacher of the Deaf (d. 1874)
  - Vincenzo Santucci, Italian Catholic cardinal (d. 1861)
  - Abraham P. Stephens, American politician (d. 1859)
- February 20 – Lázár Mészáros, Hungarian military figure (d. 1858)
- February 21
  - Prince George Bernhard of Anhalt-Dessau, German prince (d. 1865)
  - James Sherman, British minister (d. 1862)
- February 22
  - Alexis Bachelot, Roman Catholic priest (d. 1837)
  - Adolphe Quetelet, Belgian mathematician (d. 1874)
  - John N. Steele, American politician (d. 1853)
  - George Sweeny, American politician (d. 1877)
- February 23 – William W. Wick, American politician (d. 1868)
- February 24
  - Gabriel Delafosse, French mineralogist (d. 1878)
  - Carl Axel Gottlund, Linguist, folklorist and historian (d. 1875)
- February 26
  - Prosper Guerrier de Dumast, French historian, writer and archaeologist (d. 1883)
  - Thomas Galloway, Scottish mathematician (d. 1851)
- February 27 – James Planché, British dramatist, costume designer, and antiquarian (d. 1880)
- February 28
  - Edward Banks, Syndicus of the Free City of Hamburg (d. 1851)
  - Heinrich Carl Breidenstein, German musicologist (d. 1876)
- February 29 – Germanicus Mirault, surgeon (d. 1879)

=== March ===
- March 1
  - Louis-Tancrède Bouthillier, Canadian merchant and sheriff (d. 1881)
  - James Heald, English philanthropist and politician (d. 1873)
  - John Jones, Talysarn, Welsh Calvinistic Methodist minister (d. 1857)
- March 2 – Elliott Cresson, American philanthropist (d. 1854)
- March 3
  - Constant Allart, French politician (d. 1861)
  - William Heald Ludlow Bruges, English politician (d. 1848)
  - Theodore Dwight, American author (d. 1866)
- March 4
  - Charles Jacquinot, French Naval officer (d. 1879)
  - John McIntosh, Canadian politician (d. 1853)
- March 6 – Charles C. Stratton, American politician (d. 1859)
- March 7
  - Zadok Casey, American politician (d. 1862)
  - Francis Wayland, American educator; President of Brown University 1827–1855 (d. 1865)
- March 8
  - Orra White Hitchcock, American botanical artist (d. 1863)
  - Nicolaus von Weis, German bishop (d. 1869)
- March 10
  - Julia Catherine Beckwith, Canadian writer (d. 1867)
  - Karl Friedrich Heinrich Marx, German physician (d. 1877)
- March 11 – Johann Ludwig Casper, German forensic pathologist (d. 1864)
- March 12
  - Paul Constant Billot, French botanist (d. 1863)
  - Peter Johnson Gulick, American missionary to the Kingdom of Hawaii and Japan (d. 1877)
  - Jacob A. Preston, American politician (d. 1868)
  - John Prince, Lawyer, gentleman farmer and political figure in Upper Canada and Canada West (d. 1870)
  - Thomas Reynolds, Governor of Missouri (d. 1844)
  - Francis Seger, American politician (d. 1872)
- March 13
  - Francis Adams, Medical doctor, translator (d. 1861)
  - Peter van Bohlen, German orientalist and indologist (d. 1840)
- March 14
  - Anton Haizinger, Austrian singer and opera singer (d. 1869)
  - Henry F. West, Mayor of Indianapolis (d. 1856)
- March 15 – Karl Ullmann, German Calvinist theologian (d. 1865)
- March 16
  - Georgiana Astley, daughter of Sir Henry Dashwood, 3rd Baronet (d. 1835)
  - Cincinnato Baruzzi, Italian artist (d. 1878)
  - Thomas Childs, American military governor (d. 1853)
- March 17
  - Jean-François Bayard, French playwright (d. 1853)
  - Jørgen B Lysholm, Norwegian businessman (d. 1843)
- March 18
  - Christian Joseph Berres, Austrian anatomist and photographer (d. 1844)
  - Jakob Steiner, Swiss mathematician (d. 1863)
- March 19
  - Christopher Andreas Holmboe, Norwegian philologist (d. 1882)
  - José Noriega, Spanish-born Californio politician (d. 1869)
- March 20
  - Raymond Bonheur, French painter (d. 1849)
  - Edward Gibbon Wakefield, New Zealand politician (d. 1862)
- March 21 – Sir George Forster, 2nd Baronet, British politician (d. 1876)
- March 22 – Heinrich Karl Beyrich, German botanist (d. 1834)
- March 23
  - Julius Friedrich Heinrich Abegg, German criminologist (d. 1868)
  - Samuel Congalton, British mariner (d. 1850)
  - Olof Fåhræus, Swedish politician and entomologist (d. 1884)
  - John Jeffries II, American ophthalmic surgeon (d. 1876)
  - Laurent-Joseph-Marius Imbert, French Catholic missionary and saint (d. 1839)
  - Isaac R. Moores, American politician (d. 1861)
  - Peregrin Sandford, American mayor (d. 1884)
- March 24
  - Zulma Carraud, French writer (d. 1889)
  - John Corry Wilson Daly, Canadian politician (d. 1878)
  - Friedrich Adolph Haage, German botanist and gardener (d. 1866)
  - Franz Haller, Hungarian politician (d. 1875)
  - Nunziante Ippolito, Italian physician (d. 1851)
- March 25
  - Richard Biddle, American author and politician (d. 1847)
  - Basil Feilding, 7th Earl of Denbigh, English Earl (d. 1865)
- March 26
  - Armand Louis Joseph de Fitte de Soucy, French divisional general and governor of Martinique (d. 1862)
  - Bellamy Storer, Cincinnati politician (d. 1875)
- March 27
  - Jean-Claude Bonnefond, painter (d. 1860)
  - Robert James Graves, Irish surgeon (d. 1853)
  - Gregorio José Ramírez, Costa Rican politician and sailor (d. 1823)
- March 28
  - Jean Benner-Fries, French painter (d. 1849)
  - William B. Ide, Californian politician (d. 1852)
  - Elijah Iles, American politician (d. 1883)
- March 30 – Edward Seymour, English cricketer (d. 1866)
- March 31
  - Theodor Brüggemann, German politician, jurist and educationist (d. 1866)
  - Philippe Buchez, French historian, sociologist, and politician (d. 1865)
  - Hermann Hupfeld, German theologian (d. 1866)
  - Zephaniah Platt, American lawyer and judge (d. 1871)

=== April ===
- April 2
  - Ana María Campos, Venezuelan resistance fighter (d. 1828)
  - Sébastien René Lenormand, French phycologist (d. 1871)
  - William Pickering, English publisher (d. 1854)
- April 3
  - William Nairn Forbes, British Army officer and civil engineer (d. 1855)
  - Edward Livingston, American politician (d. 1840)
  - Herbert Mayo, British physiologist, anatomist and medical writer (d. 1852)
  - Jean Ulveling, Luxembourgian politician (d. 1878)
- April 6
  - Isaac E. Holmes, American politician (d. 1867)
  - Alexander Nisbet, British surgeon (d. 1874)
- April 8
  - James Boggs, Virginia militia Confederate States Army Brigadier General (d. 1862)
  - Alfred Bunn, British businessman, librettist (d. 1860)
  - Hygin-Auguste Cavé, attorney, journalist, government official, amateur playwright (d. 1852)
  - Frederik von Scholten, Danish naval officer, customs inspector and amateur artist (d. 1853)
- April 9
  - Date Chikamune, daimyo (d. 1812)
  - Elisha Huntington, American physician and politician (d. 1865)
  - Thomas Thynne, Viscount Weymouth, British Member of Parliament (d. 1837)
- April 10
  - James Bowie, American pioneer, soldier, smuggler, slave trader, and land speculator (d. 1836)
  - Thomas Burns, New Zealand minister (d. 1871)
  - Thomas Fitzgerald, American politician (d. 1855)
- April 12
  - George N. Briggs, Massachusetts Governor and Congressman (d. 1861)
  - William J. McCluney, United States Navy officer (d. 1864)
  - Baron du Potet, French mesmerist (d. 1881)
- April 13
  - Rosa Campuzano, activist in the struggle for the independence of Peru (d. 1851)
  - Andreas Gottlieb Hoffmann, German academic (d. 1864)
- April 14
  - Benjamin Bonneville, Union Army General (d. 1878)
  - Ramond de la Croisette, French playwright (d. 1849)
  - Frederik Due, Norwegian Prime minister (d. 1873)
  - Robert Lynam, English cleric, schoolteacher, writer and editor (d. 1845)
- April 15
  - John Sill Rogers, politician (d. 1860)
  - Marie-Alfred de Suin, French admiral (d. 1861)
- April 17
  - Richard Fish Cadle, American Episcopalian priest (d. 1857)
  - Dominique-Augustin Dufêtre, French bishop (d. 1860)
  - Stanisław Jachowicz, Polish poet (d. 1857)
- April 18 – Gloud Wilson McLelan, Canadian politician (d. 1858)
- April 19
  - Bernhard von Beskow, Swedish dramatist and historian (d. 1868)
  - Johann Baptist Friedreich, German forensic pathologist and psychiatrist (d. 1862)
  - Franz Anton von Gerstner, Czech surveyor (d. 1840)
- April 20
  - Francis Baring, 1st Baron Northbrook, British politician (d. 1866)
  - Charles Marc-René de Voyer de Paulmy d'Argenson, French archaeologist (d. 1862)
  - George Gleig, Scottish soldier, military writer, and priest (d. 1888)
- April 21
  - Thomas Earle, American journalist (d. 1849)
  - Frederik Faber, Danish zoologist (d. 1828)
  - Richard Ford, English writer (d. 1858)
  - Frederick A. Kaye, American politician (d. 1866)
  - Horatio Needham, American politician (d. 1863)
- April 23 – William Baird, Scottish politician (d. 1864)
- April 24
  - Karl Immermann, German writer (d. 1840)
  - Giorgio Pallavicino Trivulzio, Italian politician (d. 1878)
- April 25
  - Peter Greenall, brewer (d. 1845)
  - Giuseppe Giacinto Moris, Italian botanist (d. 1869)
- April 26 – Edouard Mary, Belgian politician and lawyer (d. 1853)
- April 27
  - Johann F. C. Hessel, German scientist (d. 1872)
  - Princess Maria Ferdinanda of Saxony, German princess (d. 1865)
- April 29
  - Solomon Yeomans Chesley, Canadian politician (d. 1880)
  - Walter Henry Medhurst, missionary in China (d. 1857)
- April 30 – Adolphe Crémieux, French-Jewish politician, abolitionist (d. 1880)

=== May ===
- May 1
  - Junius Brutus Booth, English stage actor, father of Edwin Booth and John Wilkes Booth (d. 1852)
  - Elial T. Foote, American physician, politician, jurist and historian (d. 1877)
  - Alexandru II Ghica, Ruler of Wallachia (d. 1862)
  - George Hussey Packe, MP, army officer, chairman of the Great Northern Railway (d. 1874)
  - Arabella Sullivan, British author (d. 1839)
  - Charles Cushing Wright, American engraver and medalist (d. 1857)
- May 2
  - Giuseppe Balducci, Italian composer (d. 1845)
  - Colm de Bhailís, Irish poet and songwriter (d. 1906)
  - Joseph Brown, English Roman Catholic bishop (d. 1880)
  - Mace Moulton, American politician (d. 1867)
  - John G. Palfrey, American clergyman, historian and politician (d. 1881)
- May 3 – Lewis Miller, American artist (d. 1882)
- May 4
  - Horace Mann, American educator, abolitionist (d. 1859)
  - William Pennington, American politician (d. 1862)
  - William H. Prescott, American historian and Hispanist (d. 1859)
  - Joseph Pannell Taylor, Union United States Army general (d. 1864)
- May 5
  - William Cormack, Scottish-Canadian explorer (d. 1868)
  - Robert Foulis, Canadian engineer (d. 1866)
  - Charles W. Sandford, American militia and artillery officer, lawyer and businessman (d. 1878)
- May 6
  - Karl Heinrich Frotscher, German classical philologist (d. 1876)
  - Johann Adam Möhler, German theologian (d. 1838)
- May 7
  - Frances Catherine Barnard, English writer, poet, playwright (d. 1869)
  - Karl Heinrich Mertens, German botanist and naturalist (d. 1830)
  - George Upfold, American Episcopal bishop (d. 1872)
- May 8
  - Robert Fane, British judge (d. 1864)
  - John Pitt Kennedy, British army officer (d. 1879)
  - Jean-Baptiste Meilleur, Canadian doctor, educator and political figure (d. 1878)
  - François Mignet, French historian and journalist (d. 1884)
- May 9
  - George W. Bradford, American politician, New York (d. 1883)
  - Joseph Meyer, German publisher (d. 1856)
  - August Pauly, German classical scholar (d. 1845)
  - Lyman Wight, Apostle in the Latter Day Saint movement (d. 1858)
- May 10 – Ludwig Greiner, Austrian businessman (d. 1882)
- May 12
  - Frédéric-Auguste Demetz, French penal reformer (d. 1873)
  - Johann Baptist Isenring, photographer (d. 1860)
  - Hancock Lee Jackson, American politician (d. 1876)
  - James Ranald Martin, Scottish surgeon in India (d. 1874)
  - Franz Mone, German historian (d. 1871)
- May 14 – Samuel Jaudon, American railroad executive (d. 1874)
- May 15
  - John Bingle, sailor, merchant and landholder (d. 1882)
  - Esprit Blanche, French psychiatrist (d. 1852)
  - Charlotte Caroline Richardson, British poet and writer (d. 1854)
  - Johann Heinrich Richartz, German merchant (d. 1861)
- May 16 – Ambrose Poynter, British architect (d. 1886)
- May 17
  - William Hooker, English cricketer (d. 1867)
  - Franz von Schober, Austrian poet and librettist (d. 1882)
- May 20
  - Clément Bonnand, Roman Catholic bishop (d. 1861)
  - Abel Ingpen, British entomologist (d. 1854)
- May 21
  - Reverdy Johnson, American politician (d. 1876)
  - Benjamin Ogle Tayloe, American diplomat (d. 1868)
- May 23
  - Hiram P. Hunt, American politician (d. 1865)
  - Vince Stingl, Hungarian-German porcelain manufacturer (d. 1850)
  - Zadock Thompson, American naturalist (d. 1857)
- May 24
  - George Wilmot Bonner, British wood-engraver (d. 1836)
  - Étienne-Jules Ramey, sculptor from France (d. 1852)
- May 25
  - Hippolyte Auger, French writer (d. 1881)
  - Mendes Cohen, was a Jewish American politician, traveler and businessman (d. 1879)
  - James Langston, British landowner and politician; (d. 1863)
- May 26
  - Armand Joseph Bruat, French admiral (d. 1855)
  - Aloys II, Prince of Liechtenstein (d. 1858)
- May 27
  - Henry Bidleman Bascom, American bishop (d. 1850)
  - William Ramsay, Scottish Royal Navy rear-admiral (d. 1871)
- May 28
  - Fernando Baquedano, Chilean politician and general (d. 1862)
  - Joseph-Henri Léveillé, French botanist (d. 1870)
  - William Miller, Scottish engraver and watercolorist (d. 1882)
- May 29 – Jacob G. Davies, American politician (d. 1857)
- May 30
  - Frederick Charles Husenbeth, English Catholic priest and writer (d. 1872)
  - Olivier Voutier, French naval officer (d. 1877)

=== June ===
- June 1
  - Thomas Brown Anderson, Canadian merchant, philanthropist, President of the Bank of Montreal (d. 1873)
  - Josiah Brewer, American minister and author (d. 1872)
  - Nicolas Léonard Sadi Carnot, French military engineer and physicist, "father of thermodynamics" (d. 1832)
  - John Rae, Canadian economist (d. 1872)
- June 2 – Jean-Baptiste-Pierre Lafitte, French librettist (d. 1879)
- June 3 – Dyer Ball, American missionary (d. 1866)
- June 5 – Alexander W. Brewster, American merchant (d. 1851)
- June 6
  - Francis M. Dimond, American politician (d. 1859)
  - Julius Timoleon Ducatel, geologist (d. 1849)
- June 9 – Avery Skinner, American politician in New York (d. 1876)
- June 10
  - Charles Augustus FitzRoy, British military officer (d. 1858)
  - Eugénie Foa, French writer (d. 1852)
  - Antun Mihanović, Croatian poet (d. 1861)
- June 11 – François-Louis Cailler, Swiss chocolatier (d. 1852)
- June 12
  - George Bush, American biblical scholar and pastor (d. 1859)
  - Louis Alix de Nompère de Champagny, French diplomat and politician (d. 1870)
  - Ang Duong, Cambodian politician (d. 1860)
  - Mary Grimstone, British writer and social reformer (d. 1869)
  - Joab Lawler, American politician (d. 1838)
- June 13 – Charles Eloi Demarquet, French military officer (d. 1870)
- June 14
  - Nikolai Brashman, Russian mathematician of Czech origin (d. 1866)
  - Lyman Coleman, American scholar and author (d. 1882)
  - Mathilda d'Orozco, Swedish noble (d. 1863)
  - John M. Jones, American politician from Pennsylvania (d. 1872)
  - Carlotta Marchionni, Italian actress (d. 1861)
- June 15 – Joseph-Pierre Braemt, Belgian engraver and medalist (d. 1864)
- June 16 – François Baucher, French squire (d. 1873)
- June 18
  - Friedrich Diercks, first German emigrant in Texas (d. 1848)
  - Humphrey H. Leavitt, United States federal judge (d. 1873)
  - Patrick Shaw, Scottish lawyer and legal writer (d. 1872)
- June 19
  - John Bell, American politician (d. 1869)
  - Gervais Nolan, Canadian fur trader (d. 1857)
- June 20
  - Charles Brickett Haddock, American politician (d. 1861)
  - Luigi Amat di San Filippo e Sorso, Catholic cardinal (d. 1878)
- June 21
  - William Gunning, Archdeacon of Bath (d. 1860)
  - Henry Thomas Windsor, American postal pioneer (d. 1848)
- June 22 – Nikolai Polevoy, Russian historian and writer (d. 1846)
- June 23
  - Ferdinando Giorgetti, Italian composer, violinist, publicist, musical teacher and conductor (d. 1867)
  - Henry Oakes, English cricketer (d. 1875)
  - Philo White, American newspaperman, politician and diplomat (d. 1883)
- June 24
  - Rafael Barišić, Roman Catholic bishop (d. 1863)
  - Charles Cousin-Montauban, Comte de Palikao, French general and statesman (d. 1878)
  - Jan Czeczot, Polish and Belarusian romantic poet and ethnographer (d. 1847)
  - Wilhelm Hemprich, German naturalist and explorer (d. 1825)
  - Ernst Mayer, German sculptor (d. 1844)
- June 25 – Emperor Nicholas I of Russia, Emperor of Russia (d. 1855)
- June 26
  - Jan Paweł Lelewel, painter (d. 1847)
  - Jerauld Newland Ezra Mann, sheriff of Norfolk County, Massachusetts (d. 1857)
  - Robert Parker, Canadian lawyer, judge and political figure in New Brunswick (d. 1865)
  - Joseph-Vincent Quiblier, Canadian priest (d. 1852)
- June 27
  - François-Xavier Joseph de Casabianca, French politician (d. 1881)
  - John Rivett-Carnac, British sea explorer (d. 1869)
- June 28
  - Caroline Amalie of Augustenburg, Queen consort of Denmark (d. 1881)
  - Paul Camille von Denis, German businessman (d. 1872)
- June 29
  - Pavel Petrovich Anosov, Russian mining engineer (d. 1851)
  - John Williams, English missionary (d. 1839)
- June 30
  - Antonin Moine, French sculptor (d. 1849)
  - William Davis Snodgrass, Presbyterian clergyman, New York City (d. 1886)
  - Francis Frankland Whinyates, British army officer in the East India company (d. 1887)

=== July ===
- July 1
  - Charles Tennant, English politician (d. 1873)
  - William Henry Watson, British politician and judge (d. 1860)
  - Frederick Wells, British cricketer (d. 1849)
  - James Williams, American diplomat (d. 1869)
- July 2
  - François Fulgis Chevallier, French botanist (d. 1840)
  - Michael Thonet, German-Austrian cabinet maker (d. 1871)
- July 3 – Heinrich Moritz Chalybäus, German philosopher (d. 1862)
- July 4 – John Motley Morehead, American politician (d. 1866)
- July 5 – Isaac Hays, American journalist (d. 1879)
- July 6
  - Théodore Simon Jouffroy, French philosopher (d. 1842)
  - Maria Martin, American artist and scientific illustrator (d. 1863)
  - Robert Wight, Scottish surgeon, botanist and botanical collector (d. 1872)
- July 10
  - Carl Henrik Boheman, Swedish entomologist (d. 1868)
  - Domenico Foroni, Italian composer and conductor (d. 1853)
  - María Josefa García Granados, Guatemalan writer (d. 1848)
  - John Johns, American bishop (d. 1876)
  - W. Lafontaine, French playwright (d. 1861)
  - Charles Molyneux, 3rd Earl of Sefton, British politician (d. 1855)
- July 11 – Carl Fredrik Liljevalch Sr., Swedish businessman, entrepreneur and diplomat (d. 1870)
- July 12
  - Albert Knoll, Austrian theologian (d. 1863)
  - Johann Joseph Schmeller, German painter (d. 1841)
- July 13
  - William Harvey, English engraver and designer (d. 1866)
  - Gustav Seyffarth, German-American Egyptologist (d. 1885)
- July 14
  - James Mellor Brown, English cleric (d. 1867)
  - William A. Whittlesey, American politician, Ohio (d. 1866)
- July 15
  - Thomas Bulfinch, American writer and mythologist (d. 1867)
  - Karl Friedrich Vollrath Hoffmann, German author (d. 1842)
  - Thomas Shanks, American politician (d. 1849)
  - Joseph Smith, President of Franklin College (d. 1868)
  - Joseph Augustine Wade, Irish composer (d. 1845)
- July 16
  - Jean-Baptiste-Camille Corot, French landscape and portrait painter and printmaker in etching (d. 1875)
  - Henry Grider, American politician (d. 1866)
- July 18
  - Immanuel Hermann Fichte, German philosopher (d. 1879)
  - William Lunn, Canadian educator, businessman, and politician (d. 1886)
- July 19 – Armand Malitourne, French literary critic (d. 1866)
- July 20
  - Maziere Brady, Irish judge (d. 1871)
  - Edward Hodges, Anglo-American composer and organist (d. 1867)
- July 22 – Carlo Pepoli, Italian politician, journalist, and poet (d. 1881)
- July 23 – Franz Berwald, Swedish composer (d. 1868)
- July 24
  - John M. Clayton, American lawyer and politician (d. 1856)
  - Georg, Duke of Saxe-Altenburg (d. 1853)
  - Karol Ignacy Lorinser, Austrian Physician (d. 1853)
- July 25 – Gideon Lane Soule, American educator, principal of Phillips Exeter Academy (d. 1879)
- July 26
  - George Catlin, American painter (d. 1872)
  - Lizinska de Mirbel, French miniaturist (d. 1849)
- July 27
  - Eliza Henderson Boardman Otis, American philanthropist, novelist, and social leader (d. 1873)
  - Jacques Reclus, French protestant church clergyman (d. 1882)
  - Pavel Stroyev, Russian historian (d. 1876)
- July 28
  - John Dudlow, English cricketer (d. 1879)
  - Charles Edward Long, British antiquarian (d. 1861)
  - Pakubuwono VII, Susuhunan of Surakarta (d. 1858)
- July 29
  - Walter Hunt, American mechanic and inventor (d. 1859)
  - Joannes Josephus van Mulken, Dutch politician (d. 1879)
  - Christian Winther, Danish lyric poet (d. 1876)
- July 30 – Jules Vinçard, French humorist (d. 1879)
- July 31
  - Jean-Gaspard Deburau, Bohemian-French mime (d. 1846)
  - Mary Euphrasia Pelletier, French Roman Catholic nun and saint (d. 1868)
  - Meade Purdy, American politician (d. 1870)

=== August ===
- August 1
  - George Pritchard, British Christian missionary and diplomat (d. 1883)
  - François Désiré Roulin, French explorer and scientist (d. 1874)
- August 3
  - Ferdinand Helias, American priest (d. 1874)
  - Anna Lühring, Prussian soldier (d. 1866)
- August 4 – Samuel Cahen, French Hebraist and journalist (d. 1862)
- August 5
  - Michael Banim, Irish writer (d. 1874)
  - Francisco Gómez, President of El Salvador (d. 1838)
- August 6 – Ludwig von Zanth, German architect and painter (d. 1857)
- August 7
  - John Boyd, American settler in Texas and state senator (d. 1873)
  - François Zola, French engineer (d. 1847)
- August 9 – Ezra Durgin, politician (d. 1863)
- August 13
  - Pierre Beaubien, Canadian politician (d. 1881)
  - Carl August Buchholz, organ builder (d. 1884)
  - Robert Halley, British minister (d. 1876)
- August 14
  - James Gerry, American politician (d. 1873)
  - Juan Temple, American landowner (d. 1866)
- August 15
  - Samuel C. Sample, American politician (d. 1855)
  - John Torrey, United States botanist (d. 1873)
- August 16
  - Nathaniel Boyden, American politician (d. 1873)
  - Frédéric de Courcy, French man of letters (d. 1862)
  - Francis Crozier, Irish naval officer and polar explorer (d. 1848)
- August 17 – Rufus Anderson, American minister (d. 1880)
- August 19 – Agnes Strickland, English writer and editor (d. 1874)
- August 21
  - Hugh Archer, American politician (d. 1858)
  - William Cavendish-Scott-Bentinck, Marquess of Titchfield, British politician (d. 1824)
  - Asher Brown Durand, American painter and engraver (d. 1886)
  - Hermann Olshausen, German theologian (d. 1839)
- August 22
  - David Canabarro, Brazilian Gaúcho revolutionary (d. 1867)
  - Baden Powell, mathematician (d. 1860)
  - Dhian Singh, longest serving wazir of the Sikh Empire (d. 1843)
- August 24 – George Huntington, American farmer and politician from New York (d. 1866)
- August 25
  - Edwin Beard Budding, inventor of the lawnmower and adjustable spanner (d. 1846)
  - James Lick, American businessman, piano builder (d. 1876)
  - Friedrich Ludwig Meissner, German obstetrician (d. 1860)
- August 26
  - Nicol Hugh Baird, British surveyor (d. 1849)
  - William Marshall, English politician (d. 1872)
  - Peter von Meyendorff, Russian diplomat (d. 1863)
- August 27
  - Joanna Quiner, American seamstress and sculptor (d. 1868)
  - Sophia Smith, founder of Smith College (d. 1870)
- August 28
  - William Hiley Bathurst, British hymnwriter (d. 1877)
  - Irénée-Jules Bienaymé, French mathematician (d. 1878)
  - Andreas Hallager, Danish composer (d. 1853)
- August 29 – Gaspard Théodore Mollien, French diplomat and explorer (d. 1872)
- August 30
  - Julien-Léopold Boilly, painter (d. 1874)
  - Émile Debraux, French chansonnier and poet (d. 1831)

=== September ===
- September 1
  - James Apjohn, professor of chemistry and mineralogy, Trinity College, Dublin (d. 1886)
  - Nathaniel S. Berry, American politician (d. 1894)
- September 2
  - Ferdinand-Alphonse Hamelin, French admiral (d. 1864)
  - Jean-Baptiste Minne-Barth, Belgian politician and lawyer (d. 1851)
- September 3 – Alphonse de Gisors, French architect (d. 1866)
- September 4
  - Robert Lambert Baynes, British Royal Navy admiral (d. 1869)
  - Karl Eberhard Herwarth von Bittenfeld, Prussian field marshal (d. 1884)
  - James Estabrook, American politician and sheriff (d. 1874)
  - Peter Fendi, Austrian artist (d. 1842)
  - Henry Yeomans Mott, Canadian politician (d. 1866)
- September 5
  - Jacobus Cornelis Gaal, Dutch painter and etcher (d. 1866)
  - Sarah Preston Hale, American newspaper publisher (d. 1866)
  - Pierre-Théodore Verhaegen, Belgian politician, founder of the Université libre de Bruxelles (d. 1862)
- September 6 – Charles Follen, German poet and patriot (d. 1840)
- September 7 – Abraham Edwards, American politician (d. 1870)
- September 8
  - Henry Bentinck, British courtier (d. 1878)
  - Francesco Boffo, Sardinian-born Neoclassical architect (d. 1867)
  - Jean-Jacques Champin, watercolorist and lithographer (d. 1860)
  - William Montague Ferry, American missionary (d. 1867)
  - Antonio Gutiérrez de la Fuente, president of Peru (d. 1878)
- September 9
  - Harriet Vaughan Cheney, American-Canadian novelist, writer (d. 1889)
  - Johan Nordenfalk, Swedish politician (d. 1846)
- September 10 – Eugénie Niboyet, French author, feminist (d. 1883)
- September 11
  - Alexandre Basset, French writer and playwright (d. 1870)
  - Édouard-Joseph-Ennemond Mazères, French writer and librettist (d. 1866)
- September 12
  - Uriel Crocker, American businessman (d. 1887)
  - Vasyl Popovych, Ruthenian Greek Catholic hierarch (d. 1864)
- September 13
  - John Hales Calcraft, British Member of Parliament (d. 1880)
  - James Finlay Weir Johnston, Scottish agricultural chemist (d. 1855)
  - Charles Handy Russell, American merchant and banker (d. 1884)
- September 14
  - Charles Waln Morgan, Quaker whaling executive, New Bedford, Massachusetts (d. 1861)
  - Woodbine Parish, British scientist and diplomat (d. 1882)
- September 16
  - Jean-Baptiste Bouillaud, French physician (d. 1881)
  - Johann Daniel Elster, composer and choir director (d. 1857)
  - William Augustus Muhlenberg, United States Anglican Episcopal clergyman (d. 1877)
- September 19
  - Hartley Coleridge, British poet, biographer, essayist, and teacher (d. 1849)
  - Richard Harlan, American zoologist (d. 1843)
- September 20
  - Franz Wilhelm Ferling, German oboist, composer, and clarinettist (d. 1874)
  - Robert Strange, Former US Senator from North Carolina, unsuccessful Vice Presidential nominee (d. 1854)
- September 21 – John Samuel Enys, British engineer (d. 1872)
- September 22
  - Countess Louise Sophie Danneskiold-Samsøe, member of a Danish noble family (d. 1867)
  - Albert Woldemar Hollander, German educationist (d. 1868)
  - Cornelius Stribling, United States Navy Rear Admiral (d. 1880)
- September 24 – Joseph Beaume, French painter (d. 1885)
- September 25
  - Antoine-Louis Barye, French sculptor (d. 1875)
  - Donald Cameron, 23rd Lochiel (d. 1858)
  - Samuel Jones-Loyd, 1st Baron Overstone, British politician; (d. 1883)
- September 26
  - Richard H. Bayard, American judge (d. 1868)
  - Louis Félix Étienne, marquis de Turgot, French politician (d. 1866)
  - Princess Ida of Waldeck and Pyrmont, German princess (d. 1869)
  - Daniel Turner, American politician (d. 1860)
- September 27
  - António Manuel da Fonseca, Portuguese painter (d. 1890)
  - Thomas Fortier, Canadian politician (d. 1876)
- September 28
  - Robert Budd Gilchrist, United States federal judge (d. 1856)
  - Karl Wilhelm Krüger, German classical philologist (d. 1874)
- September 29
  - Bólu-Hjálmar, Icelandic poet (d. 1875)
  - Jonathan Smith Green, American missionary to Hawaii, educator (d. 1878)
  - Samuel Irton, politician (d. 1866)
- September 30
  - John Kimball, American politician from New Hampshire and Vermont (d. 1884)
  - John Mytton, British politician (d. 1834)
  - Reuben M. Norton, American businessman, 1st Mayor of Racine, Wisconsin (d. 1884)
  - Princess Frederica of Prussia, Duchess of Anhalt-Dessau (d. 1850)

=== October ===
- October 1
  - Charles James Barnett, British politician (d. 1882)
  - Louise Swanton Belloc, French writer and translator (d. 1881)
  - Cornelia Frances Jefferson, American singer and actress (d. 1848)
  - Mikhail Muravyov-Vilensky, Russian imperial statesmen (d. 1866)
- October 2
  - Sir Henry Chamberlain, 2nd Baronet, Brazilian painter (d. 1844)
  - Sir Edward Denny, 4th Baronet, British politician (d. 1889)
  - William Boyd Kinnear, Canadian politician (d. 1868)
- October 3 – William Jameson, Scottish-Ecuadorian botanist (d. 1873)
- October 4
  - August Wilhelm Bach, German composer (d. 1869)
  - Thomas Baillie, Canadian politician (d. 1863)
  - Robert King, 4th Earl of Kingston, Irish Earl (d. 1867)
  - John Richardson, British Army officer and Canadian novelist (d. 1852)
- October 5
  - John Hoge Ewing, American politician (d. 1887)
  - Yisrael Friedman of Ruzhin, Hasidic rabbi and rebe, founder of the Ruzhyn dynasty (d. 1850)
- October 6
  - August Abendroth, Lawyer, businessman and philanthropist (d. 1867)
  - Thomas T. Fauntleroy, American military figure and politician (d. 1883)
  - Charles Backus Goddard, American lawyer and politician (d. 1864)
  - Yevgeny Obolensky, Russian military officer (d. 1865)
  - George R. Redfield, American politician from Michigan (d. 1887)
  - Leonora Cannon Taylor, member of the Relief Society (d. 1868)
- October 8 – Joseph S. Cabot, Massachusetts banker and politician (d. 1874)
- October 9
  - Fitzroy Kelly, British politician (d. 1880)
  - John Murdoch, Roman Catholic bishop in Scotland (d. 1865)
  - Rémi-Joseph Tellier, French Jesuit priest (d. 1866)
  - Joseph Bonomi the Younger, English archaeologist and writer (d. 1878)
- October 10
  - Franz Gerhard Eschweiler, German botanist (d. 1831)
  - Thomas Konow, Norwegian politician and admiral (d. 1881)
- October 11
  - August Ahlborn, German painter (d. 1857)
  - John W. Brown, American politician from New York (d. 1875)
  - Charles-Prosper Ollivier d'Angers, French neurologist (d. 1845)
- October 12
  - William Arrindell, British judge (d. 1862)
  - Jacob Eichenbaum, Galician-Jewish maskil, educator, poet and mathematician (d. 1861)
- October 13
  - Ellen Randolph Coolidge, granddaughter of Thomas Jefferson (d. 1876)
  - Stephen Creyke, English Anglican priest (d. 1883)
  - Coralie van den Cruyce, Belgian writer, feminist, poet (d. 1858)
  - Anders Retzius, Swedish scientist (d. 1860)
- October 14
  - John Easton Mills, former mayor of Montreal, Quebec (d. 1847)
  - Ludvig Nicolaus von Scheele, Danish statesman (d. 1874)
- October 15
  - John Stephen Bazin, French-born bishop in Indiana, United States (d. 1848)
  - Date Narimune, daimyo (d. 1819)
  - Toma Polyanskyi, politician (d. 1869)
- October 16
  - Jean-Joseph Ader, French playwright (d. 1859)
  - Samuel G. Andrews, American politician (d. 1863)
  - James Martin Bell, American politician (d. 1849)
  - Karl Spindler, German writer (d. 1855)
- October 17
  - Richard DeCharms, American minister (d. 1864)
  - William Deedes, English cricketer and politician (d. 1862)
  - Leopold Kupelwieser, Austrian artist (d. 1862)
  - James Matheson, British politician and merchant (d. 1878)
  - Ross Winans, inventor, locomotive builder (d. 1877)
- October 18
  - Francis Bisset Hawkins, English physician (d. 1894)
  - Hosea Ballou II, American Universalist minister (d. 1861)
  - John Wilford Blackstone Sr., American lawyer and politician (d. 1868)
- October 19
  - Remexido, Portuguese guerrilla leader (d. 1838)
  - Carl Wagner, German painter known for romantic landscape painting (d. 1867)
- October 20
  - Walter Bearblock, English cricketer (d. 1857)
  - Pierre Lorillard III, American businessman (d. 1867)
  - George W. Owen, American politician (d. 1837)
  - George Eustis Sr., American judge (d. 1858)
- October 22
  - Jacob Ljunglöf, Swedish businessman (d. 1860)
  - Achille Etna Michallon, French painter (d. 1822)
  - John James Snodgrass, British military officer, author (d. 1841)
- October 23
  - William Casson, English botanist (d. 1886)
  - Stefano Franscini, mathematician, member of the Swiss Federal Council (d. 1857)
- October 24
  - August von Platen-Hallermünde, German poet (d. 1835)
  - David Roberts, Scottish painter (d. 1864)
  - Charles Waddington, army engineer, British major-general (d. 1858)
- October 25 – Henry Crewe Boutflower, British writer and minister (d. 1863)
- October 26
  - John Bennie, South African missionary (d. 1869)
  - John Campbell, 2nd Marquess of Breadalbane, British politician (d. 1862)
  - James Curley, Irish-American astronomer (d. 1889)
  - Gottfried Osann, German chemist and physicist (d. 1866)
  - Joseph Simon Volmar, Swiss painter and sculptor (d. 1865)
- October 27 – William L. Chaplin, American abolitionist (d. 1871)
- October 28
  - Charles Egon II, Prince of Fürstenberg, German politician (d. 1854)
  - Robert Wilhelm Lagerborg, Finnish politician (d. 1849)
  - John Law, American politician (d. 1873)
  - Francis Moon, Lord Mayor of London (d. 1871)
- October 29 – Richard Spencer, American politician (d. 1868)
- October 30
  - Beaubrun Ardouin, Haitian politician and historian (d. 1865)
  - Thomas William Bramston, British politician (d. 1871)
  - Wilhelm August Rieder, painter (d. 1880)
  - John Simmons, American businessman (d. 1870)
- October 31
  - Ottilie von Goethe, German writer, editor (d. 1872)
  - Samuel Trehawke Kekewich, British politician (d. 1873)

=== November ===
- November 1 – William Adam, Scottish abolitionist and Unitarian minister (d. 1881)
- November 2
  - Frederick Chamier, British writer (d. 1870)
  - Joseph Desanat, French Provençal poet and journal editor (d. 1873)
- November 3
  - Jovan Gavrilović, Serbian historian (d. 1877)
  - Friedrich Lennig, German writer (d. 1838)
- November 4
  - John Neagle, American painter (d. 1865)
  - James McNeil Stephenson, American lawyer, businessman and politician (d. 1877)
- November 5
  - Lewis F. Linn, Jacksonian Democratic U.S. Senator for the state of Missouri (d. 1843)
  - Sir Henry Thompson, 3rd Baronet, British baronet (d. 1868)
- November 6
  - George Back, British Royal Navy admiral (d. 1878)
  - Jean-Claude-Léonard Baveux, French Sulpician priest (d. 1865)
  - Charles Richard Fox, British Army general (d. 1873)
  - Bartholomew Gugy, Canadian politician (d. 1876)
  - Leopold II, Prince of Lippe, Sovereign of the Principality of Lippe (d. 1851)
- November 7
  - Alphonso Boone, American pioneer (d. 1850)
  - Edward Pery Buckley, politician (d. 1873)
  - Charles C. Hascall, American politician (d. 1862)
- November 8 – Alexandre Vattemare, French ventriloquist and philanthropist (d. 1864)
- November 10
  - François-Xavier Méthot, Canadian politician (d. 1853)
  - Jonas Webb, English farmer (d. 1862)
- November 11
  - Phan Thanh Giản, Vietnamese official (d. 1867)
  - Frederic de Peyster, American lawyer (d. 1882)
  - Joseph Swan, engraver and publisher (d. 1872)
- November 13
  - Moritz Wilhelm August Breidenbach, German jurist (d. 1857)
  - Matthew Howard-Gibbon, British officer of arms (d. 1873)
  - Erik Julin, Finnish businessperson (d. 1874)
- November 14
  - Friederike Funk, German soprano (d. 1830)
  - Alejandro Próspero Révérend, French physician (d. 1881)
  - Robert Young, Australian clergyman (d. 1865)
- November 17
  - Thomas Hills, English cricketer (d. 1866)
  - Sir Henry Willoughby, 3rd Baronet, British politician (d. 1865)
- November 18
  - Karl Arnold-Obrist, Swiss priest (d. 1862)
  - Andrew Butler, American senator (d. 1857)
  - Henry Dangar, surveyor and pastoralist in New South Wales, Australia (d. 1861)
- November 19 – Christian Lorenz Sommer, German classical philologist (d. 1846)
- November 20
  - Pierre-Louis Billaudèle, Canadian priest (d. 1869)
  - Jean Baptiste Antoine Guillemin, French botanist (d. 1842)
  - Thomas Stearn, English cricketer (d. 1862)
- November 21 – Jean Zuléma Amussat, French surgeon (d. 1856)
- November 24
  - Stephan Ludwig Roth, Transylvanian Saxon intellectual, pedagogue, Lutheran pastor (d. 1849)
  - Maltby Strong, American politician (d. 1878)
- November 25
  - Andreas von Ettingshausen, German mathematician, physicist (d. 1878)
  - Abdollah Mirza Qajar, Iranian poet and Qajar prince (d. 1846)
  - Edward Robinson, American politician (d. 1857)
- November 27
  - Gamaliel Bartlett, American postmaster (d. 1859)
  - Alexis Bonami, Canadian fur trader (d. 1890)
  - John MacEnery, British archaeologist (d. 1841)
  - Richard Mayne, English barrister, joint Commissioner of Police of the Metropolis (d. 1868)
  - Jens Vahl, Danish botanist (d. 1854)
  - John Wright, English cricketer (d. 1857)
- November 28 – Daniel William Cahill, Irish physicist (d. 1864)
- November 29 – John Hope-Johnstone, Scottish politician (d. 1876)
- November 30 – Carl Loewe, German composer (d. 1869)

=== December ===
- December 2
  - Ödön Beöthy, Hungarian nobleman, politician (d. 1854)
  - Edward Dunsterville, British naval officer and hydrographer (d. 1873)
  - William Webb Follett, English lawyer and politician (d. 1845)
  - David Spangler, American politician (d. 1856)
- December 3
  - Francis Kenrick, Catholic Bishop of Philadelphia (d. 1863)
  - Henriette Widerberg, Swedish opera soprano (d. 1872)
- December 5
  - William Arthur, father of U.S. president Chester A. Arthur (d. 1875)
  - Thomas Flower Ellis, British law reporter (d. 1861)
  - George Mortimer Tibbits, American landowner (d. 1878)
- December 6
  - Joseph W. Jackson, American politician from Georgia state (d. 1854)
  - Henry Seymour, New Zealand politician (d. 1883)
- December 7 – Michel Charles Durieu de Maisonneuve, French botanist (d. 1878)
- December 8 – Ferdinand Wolf, Romance philologist from Austria (d. 1866)
- December 9 – Emilie Zumsteeg, German composer, music teacher, choir conductor, singer, pianist (d. 1857)
- December 10 – John Burnet Biddulph, South African explorer (d. 1837)
- December 11
  - Richard Curzon-Howe, 1st Earl Howe, British earl (d. 1870)
  - Nikolai Lukash, Imperial Russian military officer and politician (d. 1868)
  - Thomas Alexander Souter, British army officer (d. 1848)
- December 12 – John Stephenson, canadian physician (d. 1842)
- December 13 – George Storrs, American minister (d. 1879)
- December 14
  - Lilburn Boggs, American politician (d. 1860)
  - Auguste Lorieux, French writer (d. 1842)
- December 15
  - Jacob Letterstedt, Swedish businessman (d. 1862)
  - Hiram Runnels, U.S. politician (d. 1857)
- December 17
  - Thomas Chandler Haliburton, Canadian-British politician, judge and author (d. 1865)
  - Christina Robertson, Scottish artist, editor (d. 1854)
- December 18
  - Peter Daniel Bruun, Danish politician and lawyer (d. 1864)
  - James Gallatin, American banker (d. 1876)
- December 19
  - Joan Aulí, Spanish composer and organist (d. 1870)
  - Manuel Bretón de los Herreros, Spanish dramatist, poet and journalist (d. 1873)
- December 20 – Simon Meister, German painter (d. 1844)
- December 21 – Tomasz Zan, Polish poet (d. 1855)
- December 22
  - George McClellan, American surgeon (d. 1847)
  - Jared W. Williams, American politician (d. 1864)
- December 24 – Tytus Działyński, Polish politician (d. 1861)
- December 25
  - Fernán Caballero, Spanish novelist (d. 1877)
  - Hugh Lee Pattinson, English industrial chemist (d. 1858)
  - Juan Esteban Pedernera, Argentine politician and military officer (d. 1886)
  - Frederick Augustus Ross, American minister (d. 1883)
- December 27
  - Mirza Ghalib, Persian poet of Urdu (d. 1869)
  - Franciszek Pfanhauser, Polish painter (d. 1865)
  - Karl Friedrich von Steinmetz, Prussian field marshal (d. 1877)
- December 29
  - William B. Calhoun, American politician (d. 1865)
  - Johann Christian Poggendorff, German physicist (d. 1877)
  - Ferdinand von Wrangel, Baltic German explorer and Russian admiral (d. 1870)
- December 30 – Miklós Wesselényi, Hungarian politician (d. 1850)

Date unknown

- Du Bois Agett, early settler of Western Australia (d. 1866)
- Edwin Beard Budding, English engineer and inventor of the lawnmower (d. 1846)
- Mirza Shafi Vazeh, Azeri poet (d. 1852)

1797

=== January–March ===
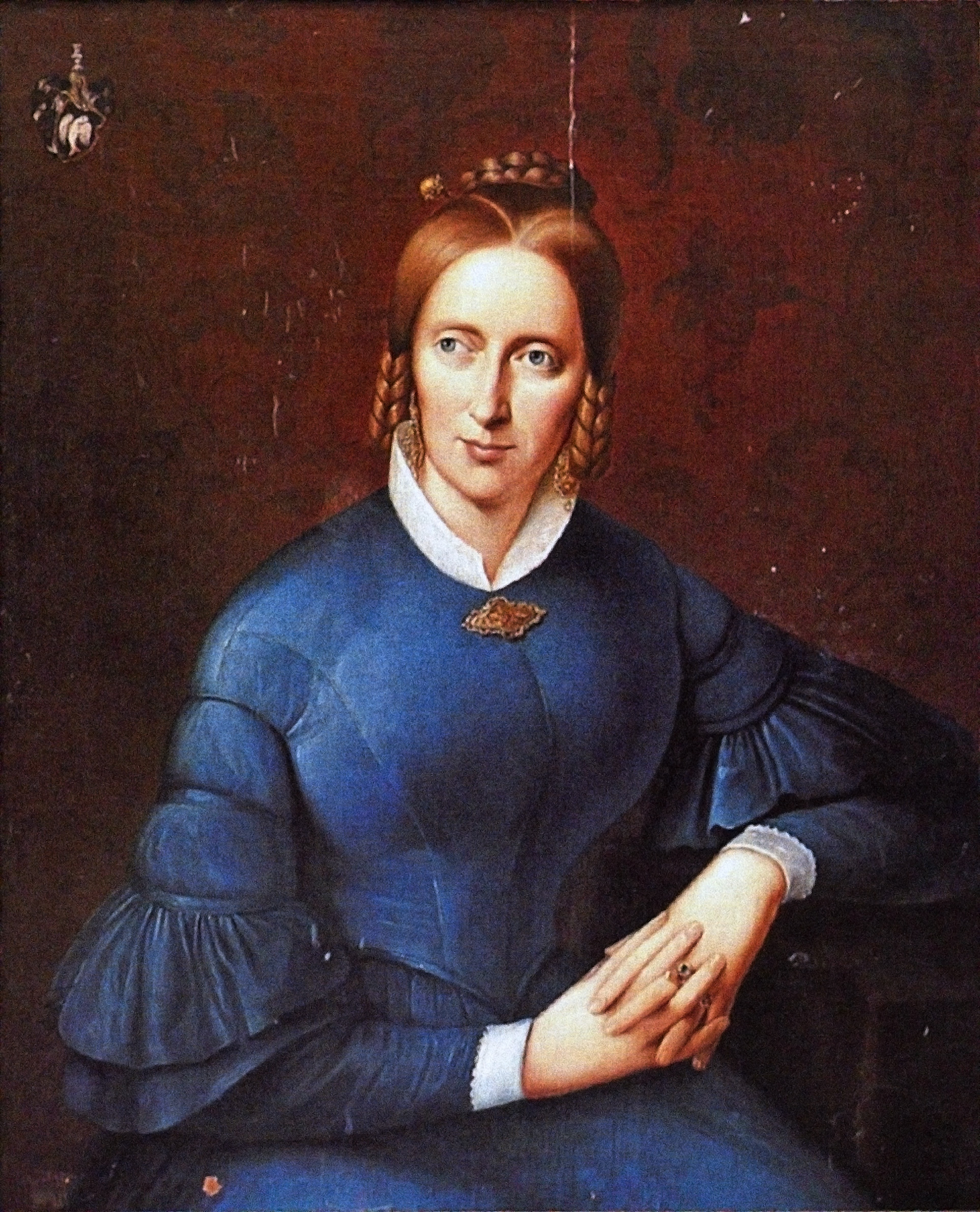
Annette von Droste-Hülshoff

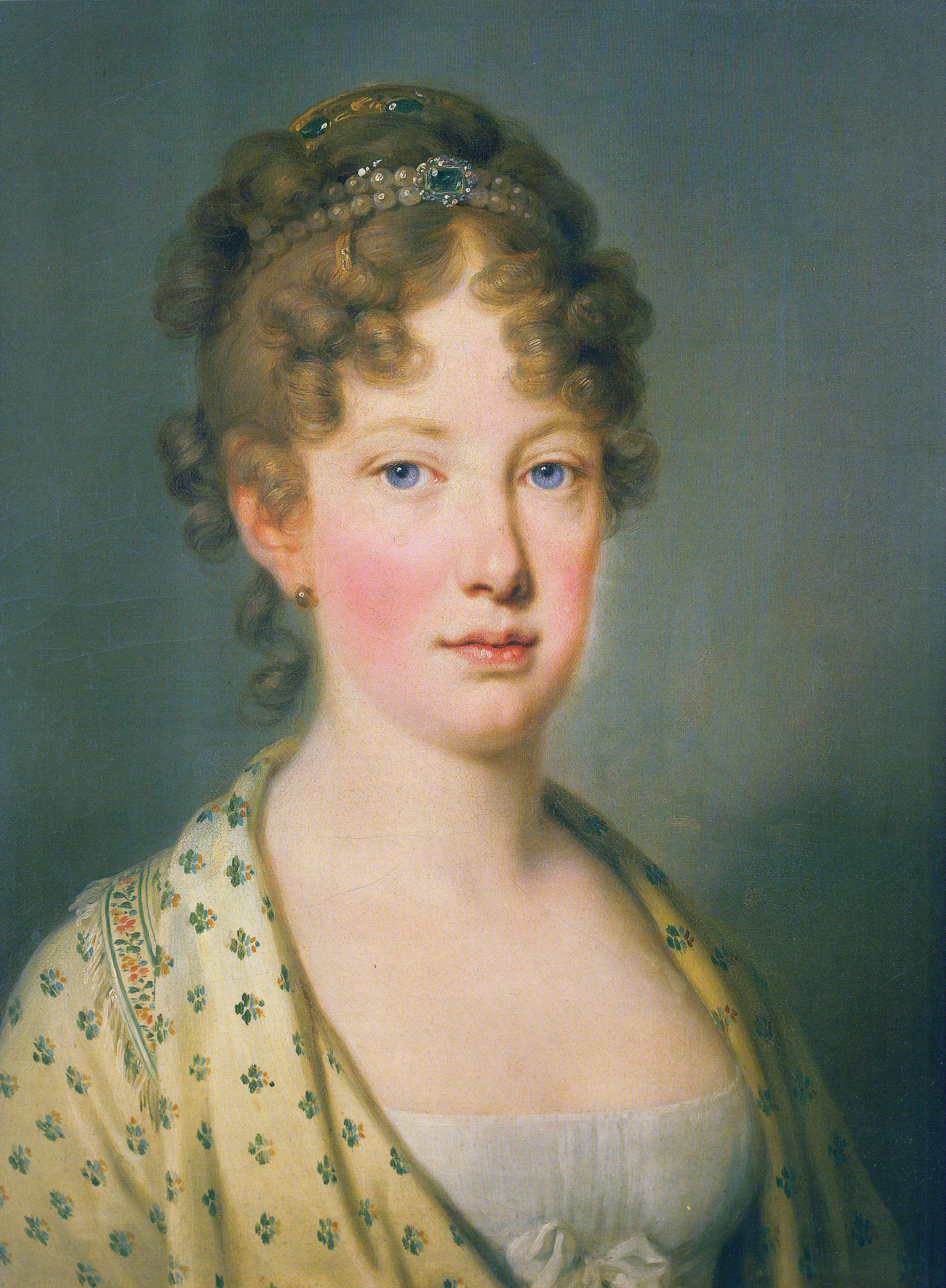
Maria Leopoldina of Austria

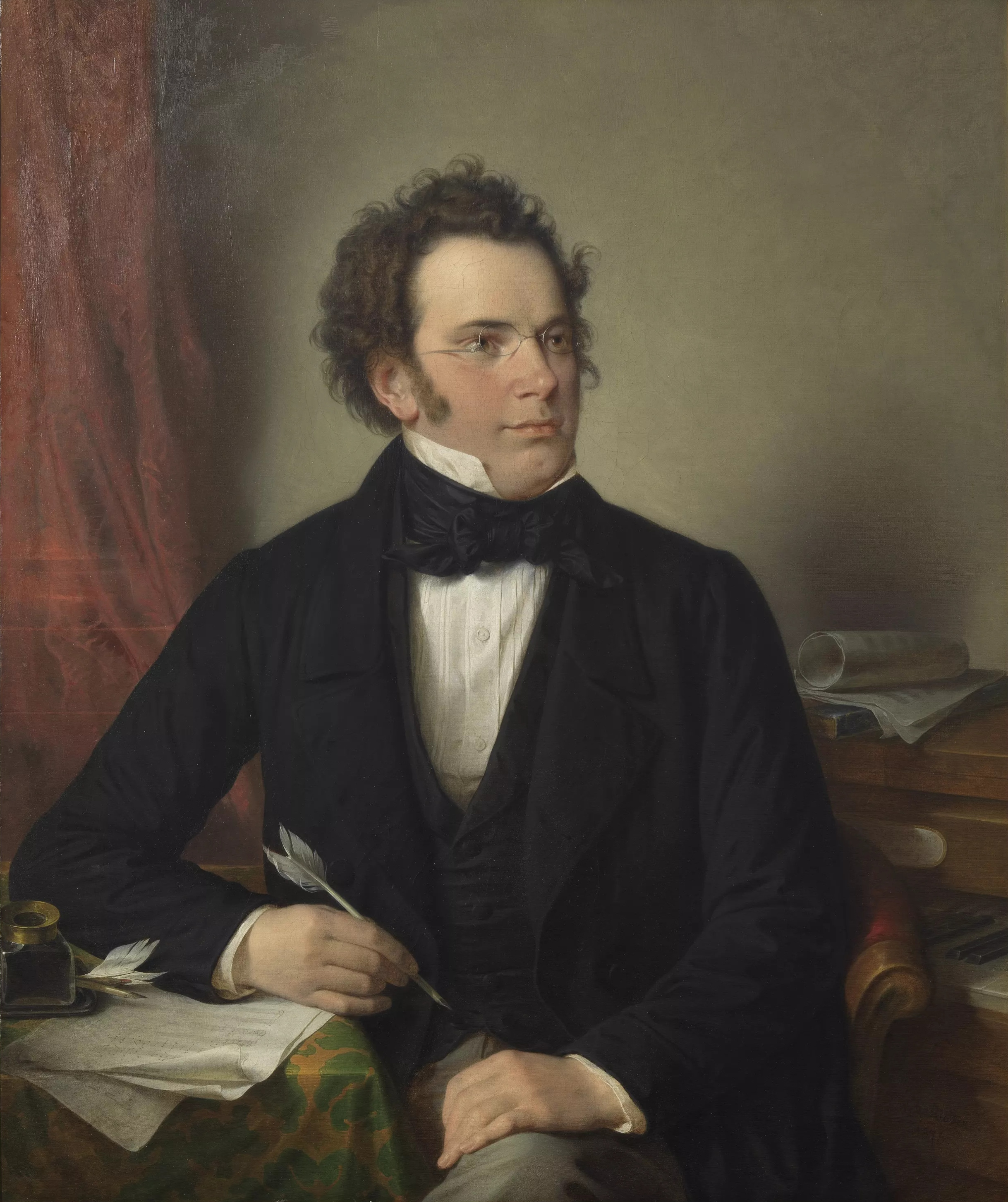
Franz Schubert

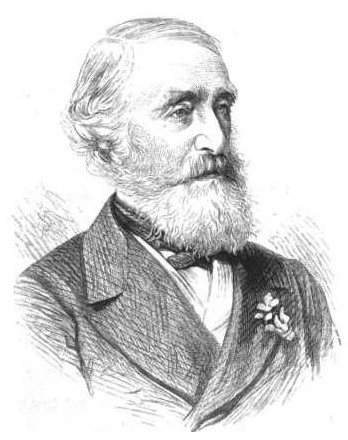
George Julius Poulett Scrope

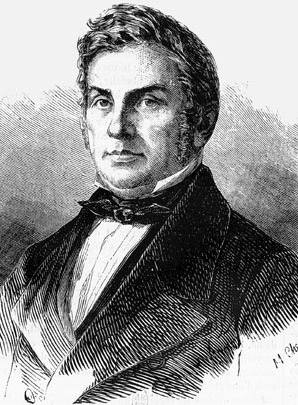
Michel Goudchaux

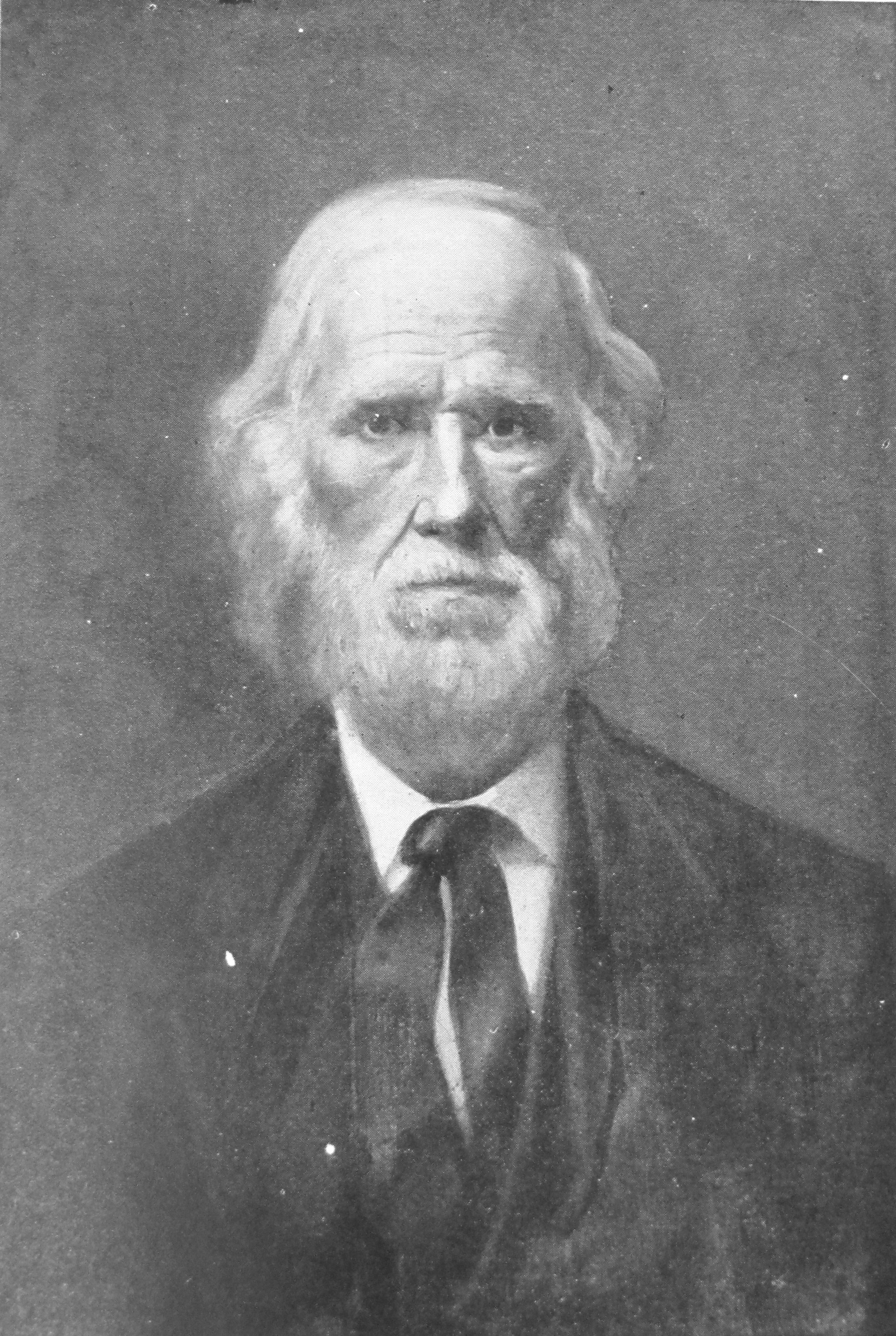
J. G. M. Ramsey

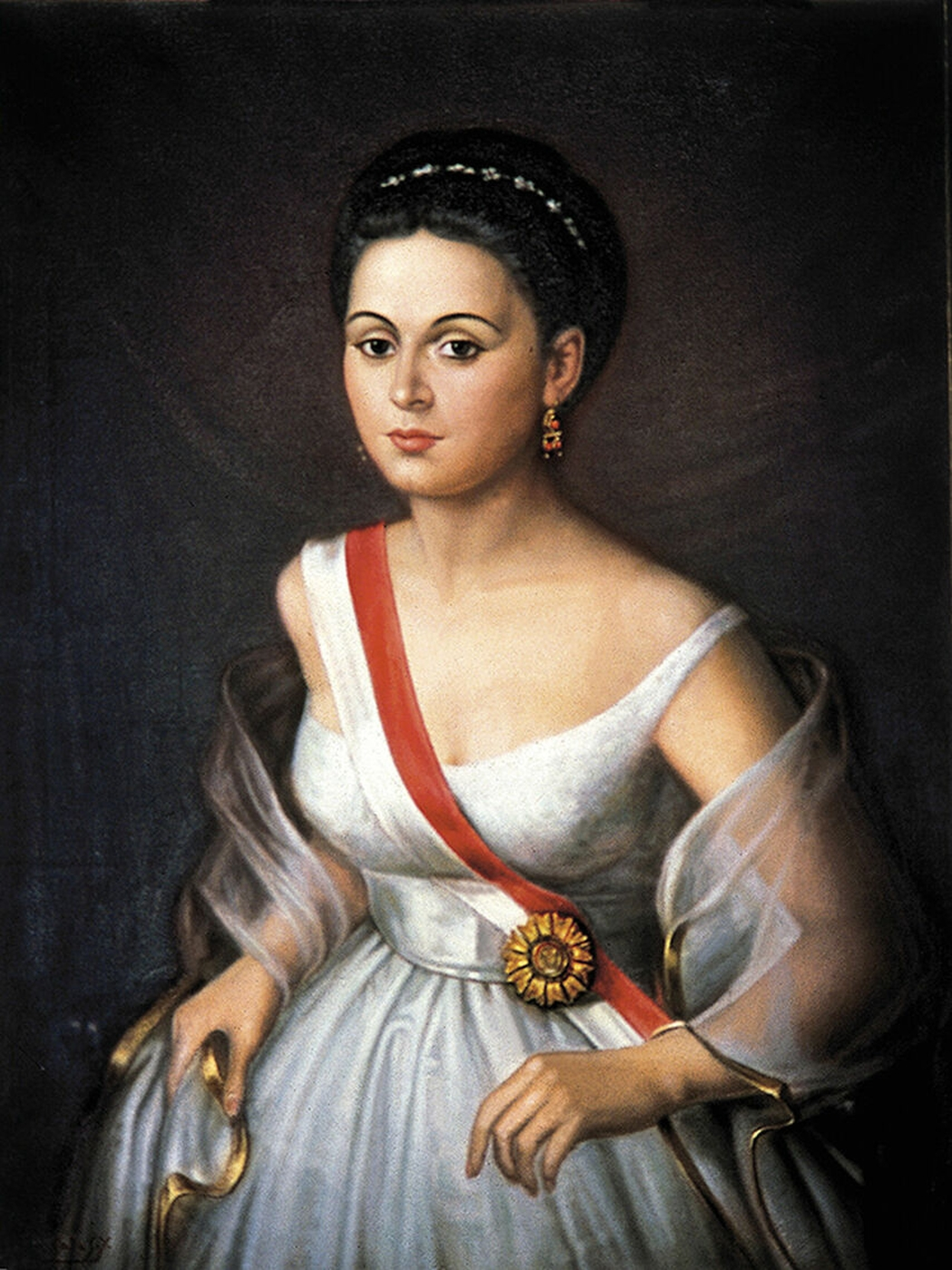
Manuela Sáenz

- January 1
  - Christopher Jacob Boström, Swedish philosopher (d. 1866)
  - Utagawa Kuniyoshi, Japanese woodblock printer (ukiyo-e) (d. 1861)
- January 3 – Frederick William Hope, English entomologist at the University of Oxford (d. 1862)
- January 4 – Wilhelm Beer, German banker, astronomer (d. 1850)
- January 5 – Eduard Vogel von Falckenstein, Prussian general (d. 1885)
- January 6 – Edward Turner Bennett, English zoologist and writer (d. 1836)
- January 9 – Edmund Murray Dodd, Canadian lawyer (d. 1876)
- January 10 – Annette von Droste-Hülshoff, German writer (d. 1848)
- January 11
  - Carl Rottmann, German landscape painter, the most famous member of the Rottmann family of painters (d. 1850)
  - Connop Thirlwall, English bishop (in Wales), historian (d. 1875)
- January 12
  - Gideon Brecher, Austrian physician, writer (d. 1873)
- January 14 – George Agar-Ellis, 1st Baron Dover, British peer and man of letters (d. 1833)
- January 15 – Vincenz Kollar, Austrian entomologist specializing in Diptera (d. 1860)
- January 17 – Joseph Barclay Pentland, Irish geographer (d. 1873)
- January 19
  - Henri-Bernard Dabadie, French baritone (d. 1853)
  - Cornelia Aletta van Hulst, Dutch painter (d. 1870)
- January 20 – Jonathan Leavitt, American bookbinder, co-founder of the New York City publishing firm of Leavitt & Trow (d. 1852)
- January 21 – Joseph Méry, French writer (d. 1866)
- January 22
  - Archduchess Maria Leopoldina of Austria, Empress consort of Brazil (d. 1826)
  - Thomas Moore-Lane, Irish oculist, surgeon, physician to the Nawab (d. 1844)
- January 24 – Leo Dupont, Martinique-born Venerated French Catholic, who helped spread various Catholic devotions (d. 1876)
- January 25
  - Achille Rémy Percheron, French entomologist (d. 1869)
  - John Stuart, 12th Earl of Moray (d. 1867)
- January 26 – Therese Albertine Luise Robinson, German-American author (d. 1870)
- January 28 – Narcisse Girard, French violinist (d. 1860)
- January 29
  - Marguerite Beaubien, Canadian nun, mother superior with the Sisters of Charity (d. 1848)
  - Prince Adolf zu Hohenlohe-Ingelfingen, Prussian nobleman (d. 1873)
- January 30 – Edwin Vose Sumner, career United States Army officer who became a Union Army general during the American Civil War (d. 1863)
- January 31 – Franz Schubert, Austrian pianist, composer (d. 1828)
- February 1 – Frederick Sullivan, English first-class cricketer associated with Marylebone Cricket Club (MCC) (d. 1873)
- February 2
  - Joseph Louis Corbin, French general who took command of the successful attack that lifted the Siege of Constantine in 1837 (d. 1859)
  - Bertha Zück, German-born treasurer of Queen Josephine of Sweden (d. 1868)
- February 5 – György Andrássy, Hungarian nobleman (d. 1872)
- February 6
  - Richard Hawes, United States Representative from Kentucky and the second Confederate Governor of Kentucky (d. 1877)
  - Vaast Barthélemy Henry, French Catholic priest (d. 1884)
  - Joseph von Radowitz, conservative Prussian statesman, general (d. 1853)
- February 10 – George Chichester, 3rd Marquess of Donegall, British landowner, courtier and politician (d. 1883)
- February 11 – Richard Temple-Nugent-Brydges-Chandos-Grenville, 2nd Duke of Buckingham and Chandos, English Conservative politician (d. 1861)
- February 12 – John Timon, first Roman Catholic Bishop of Buffalo (d. 1867)
- February 14 – Pierre Sylvain Dumon, French politician, deputy (1831-1848) (d. 1870)
- February 15 – Henry Engelhard Steinway, German-American piano manufacturer (d. 1871)
- February 17 – Charles Alexandre, French Hellenist (d. 1870)
- February 18
  - Jean-Baptiste Boucho, French-born Vicar Apostolic of Malacca-Singapore (d. 1871)
  - John Day, Liberian politician and jurist, 2nd Chief Justice of Liberia (1854 until his death) (d. 1859)
- February 19
  - Giuseppe Avezzana, Italian soldier fighting in Europe and America (d. 1879)
  - Wincenty Smokowski, Polish-Lithuanian painter, illustrator (Academic and Classical styles) (d. 1876)
- February 21 – João Mouzinho de Albuquerque, Portuguese writer, administrator (d. 1881)
- February 22
  - Jean Baptiste Hippolyte Dance, French pathologist remembered for Dance's sign (d. 1832)
  - Yelizaveta Golitsyna, Russian noble, Catholic nun (d. 1844)
- February 23 – Heinrich Halfeld, German engineer (d. 1873)
- February 24 – Samuel Lover, Irish songwriter (d. 1868)
- February 25 – Maria Abdy, English poet (d. 1867)
- February 27
  - Wilhelm Meinhold, Pomeranian priest, author (d. 1851)
  - Henry George Ward, English diplomat, politician, and colonial administrator (d. 1860)
- February 28 – John Henderson, Mississippi lawyer, United States Senator (d. 1857)
- March 2 – Étienne Mulsant, French entomologist, ornithologist (d. 1880)
- March 3 – Gotthilf Hagen, German civil engineer who made important contributions to fluid dynamics (d. 1884)
- March 5
  - Friedrich von Gerolt, Prussian Privy Councillor, Envoy Extraordinary and Minister Plenipotentiary in the United States (d. 1879)
  - James Rider, American politician from New York (d. 1876)
- March 6 – Gerrit Smith, American social reformer (d. 1874)
- March 7 – Édouard Thibaudeau, Lower Canadian lawyer, political figure (d. 1836)
- March 10
  - Henry Acton, English Unitarian minister (d. 1843)
  - Selah R. Hobbie, United States Representative from New York (d. 1854)
  - Henry Liddell, 1st Earl of Ravensworth, British peer, Member of Parliament for several constituencies (d. 1878)
  - George Julius Poulett Scrope, English geologist, political economist and magistrate (d. 1876)
- March 12 – Benjamin Caesar, English professional cricketer who played first-class cricket (1824-1830) (d. 1867)
- March 13
  - Eleazer Parmly, American dentist in New York City (d. 1874)
  - Charles de Rémusat, French politician and writer (d. 1875)
  - George Bacon Wood, American physician (d. 1879)
- March 15 – Benjamin Guérard, French librarian, historian (d. 1854)
- March 16
  - Lavinia Ryves, British woman claiming to be a member of the British royal family (d. 1871)
  - Alaric Alexander Watts, British poet, journalist (d. 1864)
- March 17
  - Andrew Fernando Holmes, Canadian physician (d. 1860)
  - Johann Adam Pupikofer, Swiss historian, curator of the Thurgau cantonal archive in Frauenfeld (d. 1882)
- March 18 – Michel Goudchaux, French banker, politician who was twice Minister of Finance during the French Second Republic (d. 1862)
- March 19
  - John Braithwaite, English engineer, inventor of the first steam fire engine (d. 1870)
  - Addison Gardiner, American lawyer and politician, Chief Judge of the New York Court of Appeals (1854-1855) (d. 1883)
- March 20 – John Roberton, Scottish physician, social reformer (d. 1876)
- March 21 – Johann Andreas Wagner, German palaeontologist (d. 1861)
- March 22
  - Eduard Gans, German jurist (d. 1839)
  - Emperor Wilhelm I of Germany (d. 1888)
  - Jean-Bernard Rousseau, French Roman Catholic professed religious of the Institute of the Brothers of the Christian Schools (d. 1867)
  - Józef Zaliwski, Polish independence activist (d. 1855)
- March 23 – Ernest Edgcumbe, 3rd Earl of Mount Edgcumbe, English politician (d. 1861)
- March 24
  - Abraham Hoagland, early American Mormon leader (d. 1872)
  - Thomas B. Jackson, United States Representative from New York (d. 1881)
  - Sackville Lane-Fox, British Conservative Party politician (d. 1874)
  - Antonio Rosmini-Serbati, Italian Catholic priest, philosopher (d. 1855)
- March 25
  - Auguste-Arthur, Comte de Beugnot, French historian, statesman (d. 1865)
  - J. G. M. Ramsey, American historian (d. 1884)
  - John Winebrenner, American founder of the Churches of God General Conference (d. 1860)
- March 26
  - Fortunato José Barreiros, Portuguese colonial administrator, military architect (d. 1885)
  - Joseph Fielding, early American leader of the Latter Day Saint movement (d. 1863)
  - Hedworth Lambton, Liberal Party politician in the United Kingdom (d. 1876)
- March 27
  - John Dix Fisher, physician and founder of Perkins Institution for the Blind in Boston (d. 1850)
  - George Glyn, 1st Baron Wolverton, English banker with interests in the railways (d. 1873)
  - Heinrich LXXII, Prince Reuss of Lobenstein and Ebersdorf (d. 1853)
  - Alfred de Vigny, French poet, early leader of French Romanticism (d. 1863)
- March 28 – George O. Belden, American politician, Representative from New York (d. 1833)
- March 29 – Charles I. du Pont, American manufacturer, politician (d. 1869)
- March 31
  - William Ryerson, Methodist minister, political figure in western Canada (d. 1872)
  - Walter Calverley Trevelyan, English naturalist, geologist (d. 1879)

=== April–June ===
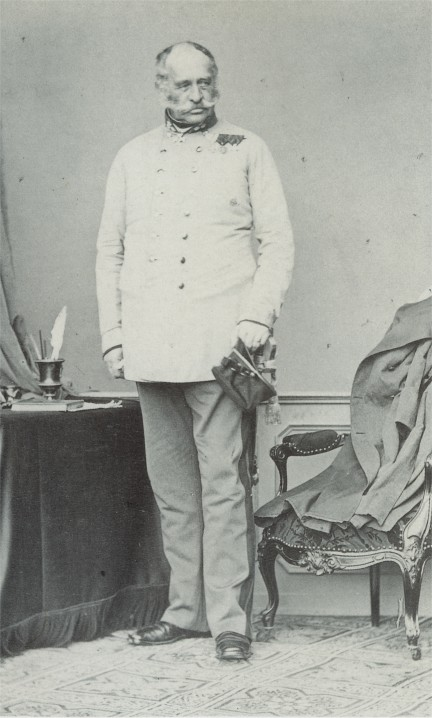
Franz Graf von Wimpffen

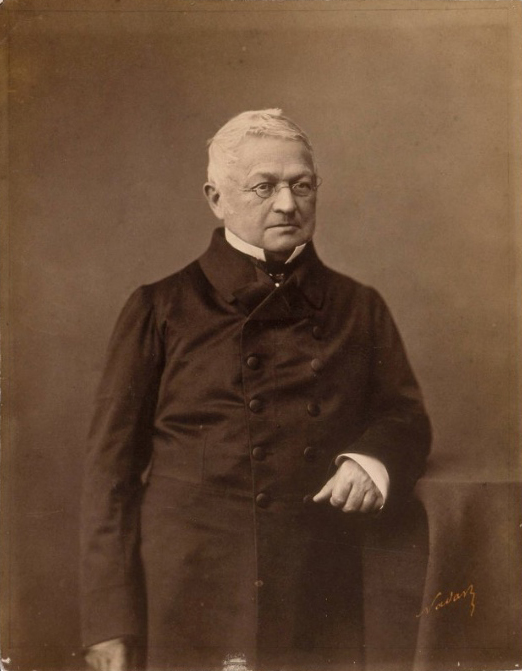
Adolphe Thiers

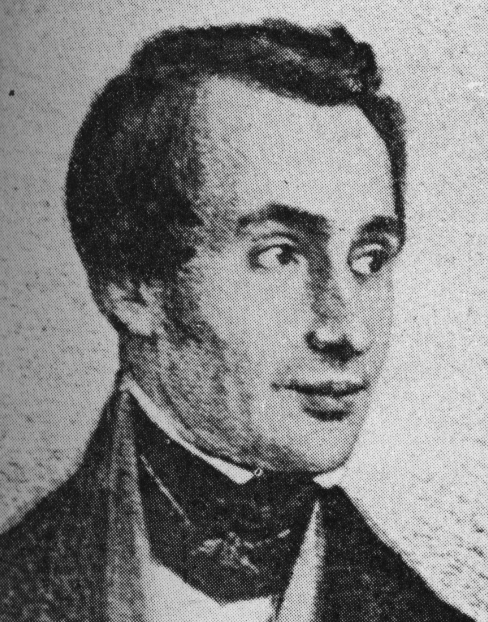
Jean Victoire Audouin

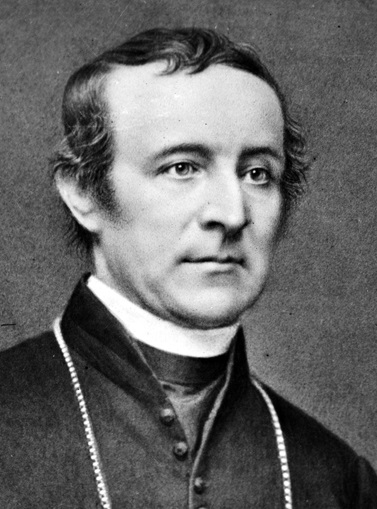
John Hughes

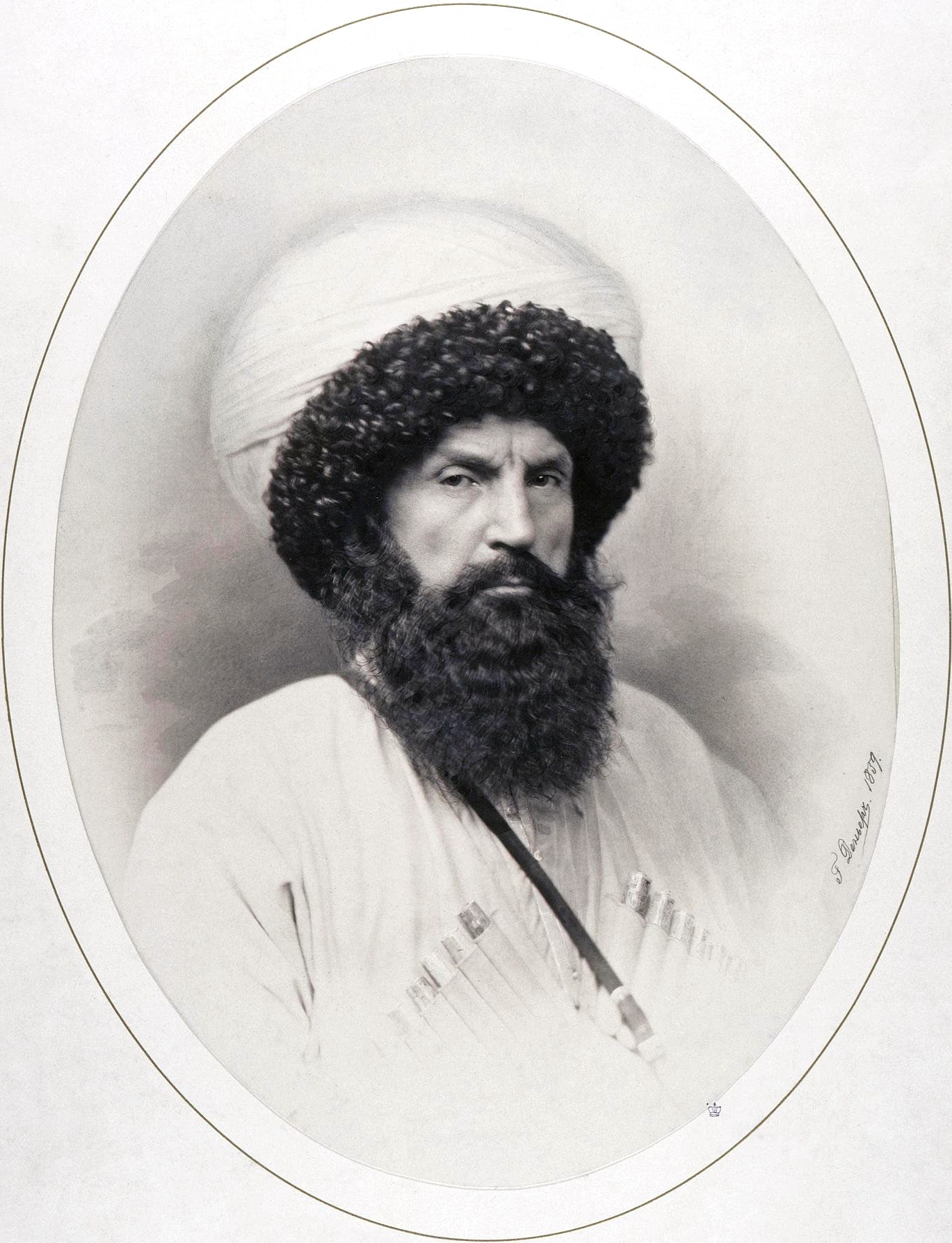
Imam Shamil

- April 1
  - Sir William Alexander, 3rd Baronet of England (d. 1873)
  - Ludwig Titze, Austrian singer associated with Franz Schubert's songs (d. 1850)
- April 2
  - Samuel Bogart, itinerant Methodist minister, militia captain from Ray County, Missouri (d. 1861)
  - Joseph-François Deblois, Lower Canadian lawyer (d. 1860)
  - John Peter Gassiot, English businessman, amateur scientist (d. 1877)
  - Dunning R. McNair, Sergeant at Arms of the United States Senate (1853-1861) (d. 1875)
  - David Robertson, 1st Baron Marjoribanks, Scottish stockbroker, politician (d. 1873)
  - Franz Graf von Wimpffen, Austrian general, admiral (d. 1870)
- April 3
  - Judson Allen, American businessman, politician (d. 1880)
  - Ebenezer Childs, American pioneer (d. 1864)
  - Barthélemy Charles Joseph Dumortier, Belgian botanist, Member of Parliament (d. 1878)
- April 4
  - Asa Wentworth Jr., Vermont businessman and politician, President of the Vermont State Senate (d. 1882)
  - Joseph Dresser Wickham, American minister (d. 1891)
- April 5
  - Karl August Devrient, German stage actor best known for performances of Schiller and Shakespeare (d. 1872)
  - Johann Fischbach, Austrian painter (d. 1871)
  - Henry Perrine, physician, horticulturist, United States Consul in Campeche, Mexico (d. 1840)
- April 6
  - Meta Heusser-Schweizer, Swiss poet (d. 1876)
- April 7
  - Théodore Anne, French playwright (d. 1869)
  - Louis Thomas Jérôme Auzoux, French anatomist, naturalist (d. 1880)
  - Pierre Leroux, French philosopher, political economist (d. 1871)
  - Joseph Young, early American convert to the Latter Day Saint movement, missionary, longtime general authority of the LDS Church (d. 1881)
- April 8 – Jehiel Brooks, American soldier, territorial governor, and plantation owner (d. 1886)
- April 9
  - Pierre Carmouche, French playwright, chansonnier (d. 1868)
  - John Hill, United States Representative from North Carolina (d. 1861)
- April 12 – Zina Pitcher, American physician (d. 1872)
- April 13 – Stanislas Julien, French sinologist, Chair of Chinese at the Collège de France for over 40 years (d. 1873)
- April 15
  - Philip Dorsheimer, politician, New York State Treasurer (d. 1868)
  - Michel Garicoïts, French Basque Roman Catholic priest, founder of the Congregation of the Sacred Heart of Jesus of Bétharram (d. 1863)
  - Adolphe Thiers, President of France and Prime Minister of France (d. 1877)
- April 17
  - William Beresford, British Conservative politician (d. 1883)
  - John Ogilvie, Scottish lexicographer, editor of the Imperial Dictionary of the English Language (d. 1867)
- April 18
  - Thomas J. Drake, American lawyer, Lieutenant Governor of Michigan (d. 1875)
  - Richard Ryan, British biographer of Irish descent (d. 1849)
- April 19
  - Carlo Emanuele Muzzarelli, Italian clergyman (d. 1856)
  - Jeronis de Soysa, pioneering Ceylonese entrepreneur, philanthropist (d. 1860)
- April 21 – George Stephen Benjamin Jarvis, Upper Canadian judge, political figure (d. 1878)
- April 23
  - Ranulph Dacre, New Zealand naval seaman (d. 1884)
  - Giuseppe Ferlini, Italian combat medic turned explorer and treasure hunter (d. 1870)
  - Penina Moise, United States poet (d. 1880)
  - Ernst Ferdinand Oehme, German Romantic painter, illustrator (d. 1855)
- April 24
  - Henry Bliss, author, lawyer and provincial agent for New Brunswick and Nova Scotia (d. 1873)
  - Peter I. Borst, American politician, United States Representative from New York (d. 1848)
- April 26 – Albert Seerig, German surgeon, anatomist (d. 1862)
- April 27
  - Jean Victoire Audouin, French naturalist, entomologist, herpetologist, ornithologist, and malacologist (d. 1841)
  - Eliphaz Fay, fourth president of Colby College (then called the Waterville College) in Maine (d. 1854)
  - William B. Slaughter, United States politician (d. 1879)
  - Linus Yale Sr., American inventor, manufacturer of locks (d. 1858)
- April 28 – John Richardson, Australian convict, accompanies several exploring expeditions as botanical collector (d. 1882)
- April 29 – Gideon Hard, American lawyer, politician (d. 1885)
- May 1
  - Pierre Nicolas Gerdy, French physician, native of Loches-sur-Ource (d. 1856)
  - Johann Jakob Stähelin, Swiss theologian (d. 1875)
- May 2
  - Abraham Pineo Gesner, Canadian geologist and inventor (d. 1864)
- May 3
  - Heinrich Berghaus, German geographer (d. 1884)
  - George Webster, English architect practising in Kendal (d. 1864)
- May 6 – Joseph Brackett, American religious leader, composer (d. 1882)
- May 7
  - Walter Colton, Chaplain for the United States Navy (d. 1851)
  - Charles Frederick, Royal Navy officer, Third Naval Lord (d. 1875)
  - Elizabeth Grant, British diarist (d. 1885)
  - José Antonio Saco, Cuban statesman, deputy to the Spanish Cortes, writer, social critic, publicist, essayist, anthropologist, historian (d. 1879)
- May 8
  - Giacomo Luigi Brignole, Italian Catholic Cardinal, Camerlengo of the Sacred College of Cardinals (d. 1853)
  - John Septimus Roe, first Surveyor-General of Western Australia (d. 1878)
- May 9 – Lansdown Guilding, St. Vincent-born English theologian, early naturalist (d. 1831)
- May 10 – Daniel Lynn Carroll, sixth President of Hampden–Sydney College (1835-1838) (d. 1851)
- May 11
  - Clement Finley, 10th Surgeon General of the United States Army (d. 1879)
  - Ernst Meyer, German-born Danish genre painter of Jewish ancestry (d. 1861)
  - José Mariano Salas, Mexican general and politician, twice interim president of Mexico (1846 and 1859) (d. 1867)
- May 12 – Johann Hermann Kufferath, German composer (d. 1864)
- May 13 – Ulrik Frederik Cappelen, Norwegian jurist and politician (d. 1864)
- May 14 – Carl Georg Christian Schumacher, German painter (d. 1869)
- May 15
  - George Dromgoole, Virginia politician, lawyer (d. 1847)
  - Lydia Irving, British philanthropist, prison visitor (d. 1893)
  - Auguste Bottée de Toulmon, 19th-century French composer, musicologist (d. 1850)
- May 16
  - Pascual Echagüe, Argentine soldier, politician (d. 1867)
  - Pierre-Chéri Lafont, French actor (d. 1873)
- May 18
  - Stoddard Judd, American physician, politician (d. 1873)
  - Frederick Augustus II of Saxony (d. 1854)
- May 19
  - Jean-Baptiste Marc Bourgery, French physician and anatomist, native of Orléans (d. 1849)
  - Richard Pakenham, British diplomat, Ambassador to the United States (d. 1868)
  - Maria Isabel of Portugal, Queen of Spain (d. 1818)
- May 20 – Alexis-François Rio, French writer on art (d. 1874)
- May 21
  - Claus Winter Hjelm, Norwegian legal scholar, judge (d. 1871)
  - Nathan Ryno Smith, American surgeon, medical school professor (d. 1877)
- May 24
  - James Turner Morehead, United States Senator and the 12th Governor of Kentucky (d. 1854)
  - Archibald Randall, United States federal judge (d. 1846)
  - Lars Rasch, Norwegian jurist, politician (d. 1864)
  - Henry Thynne, 3rd Marquess of Bath, England (d. 1837)
- May 26 – Ralph Randolph Gurley, American clergyman (d. 1872)
- May 27 – Sir Thomas Bazley, 1st Baronet of England (d. 1883)
- May 29
  - Edwin Croswell, American journalist, politician (d. 1871)
  - Nicolas Roret, French editor, publisher known for an important series of manuals (Manuels) and encyclopedias (d. 1860)
- May 30 – Georg Amadeus Carl Friedrich Naumann, German mineralogist (d. 1873)
- June 1 – Abby Hadassah Smith, early American suffragist, campaigner for property and voting rights from Glastonbury (d. 1879)
- June 2 – Joseph Blake, 3rd Baron Wallscourt, Irish nobleman and pioneering socialist (d. 1849)
- June 6 – Rehuel Lobatto, Dutch mathematician (d. 1866)
- June 7
  - Manuel Alves Branco, 2nd Viscount of Caravelas, Brazilian politician (d. 1855)
  - Richard Samuel Guinness, Irish lawyer and a Member of Parliament (d. 1857)
- June 8 – Henry William-Powlett, 3rd Baron Bayning, English peer and clergyman (d. 1866)
- June 11
  - Francis Conyngham, 2nd Marquess Conyngham, English soldier, courtier and politician (d. 1876)
  - Henry Lascelles, 3rd Earl of Harewood, English peer and Member of Parliament (d. 1857)
  - José Trinidad Reyes, Honduran Father, national hero, and founder of Autonomous National University of Honduras (d. 1855)
- June 12 – Thomas Ainslie Young, official and political figure in Lower Canada (d. 1860)
- June 15
  - Honoratus Bonnevie, Norwegian politician (d. 1848)
  - Sámuel Brassai, centenarian, linguist, teacher, "The Last Transylvanian Polymath" (d. 1897)
- June 16
  - Sophie Frémiet, French painter (d. 1867)
  - Alexander Kazarsky, Russian Navy officer, hero of the Russo-Turkish War (d. 1833)
- June 17 – Alexandre Vinet, Swiss critic and theologian (d. 1847)
- June 19 – Hamilton Hume, early explorer of the present-day Australian states of New South Wales and Victoria (d. 1873)
- June 20 – Karolina Gerhardinger, German Roman Catholic professed religious, established the School Sisters of Notre Dame (d. 1879)
- June 21 – Christoffel Brand, South African jurist (d. 1875)
- June 23 – Théophile Bra, French Romantic sculptor and exact contemporary of Eugène Delacroix (d. 1863)
- June 24
  - Francisco Freire Allemão e Cysneiro, Brazilian botanist who collected in northeast Brazil and along the Rio de Janeiro (d. 1874)
  - Johan Coenraad van Hasselt, Dutch physician, zoologist (d. 1823)
  - John Hughes, Irish-born prelate of the Roman Catholic Church in the United States (d. 1864)
- June 26 – Imam Shamil, Avar political and religious leader of the Muslim tribes of the Northern Caucasus (d. 1871)
- June 29 – Frederic Baraga, Slovenian Catholic missionary to the United States, grammarian of Native American languages (d. 1868)

=== July–September ===
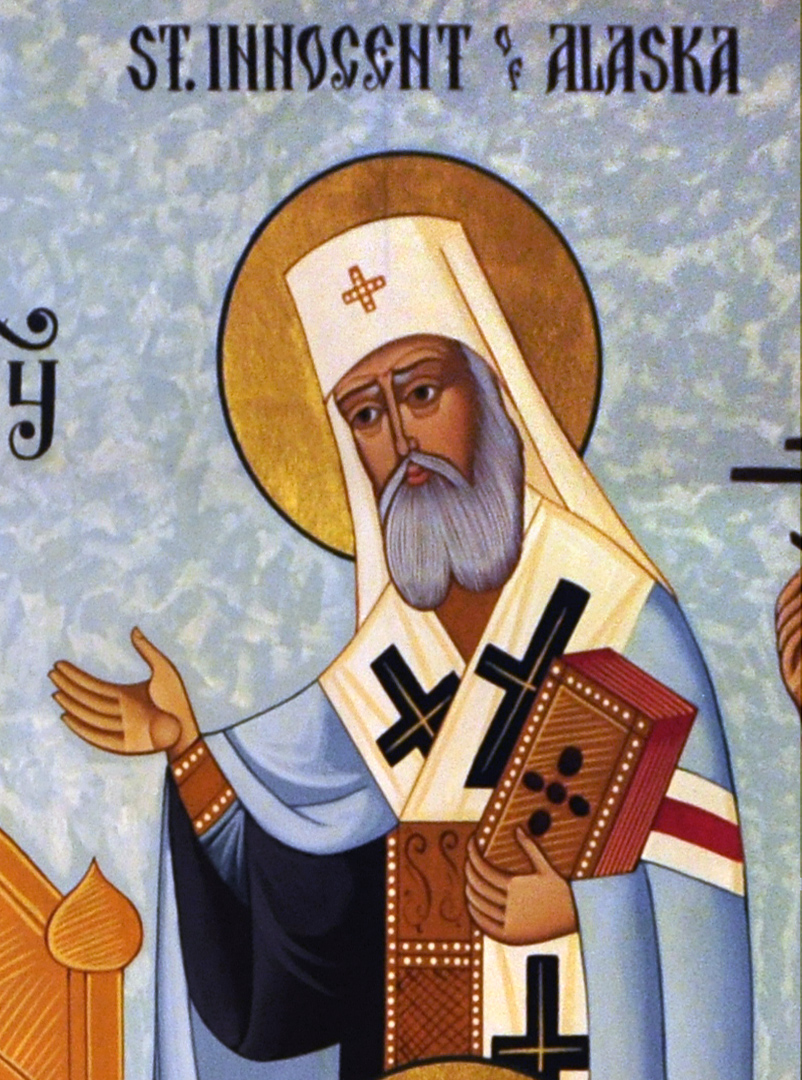
Innocent of Alaska

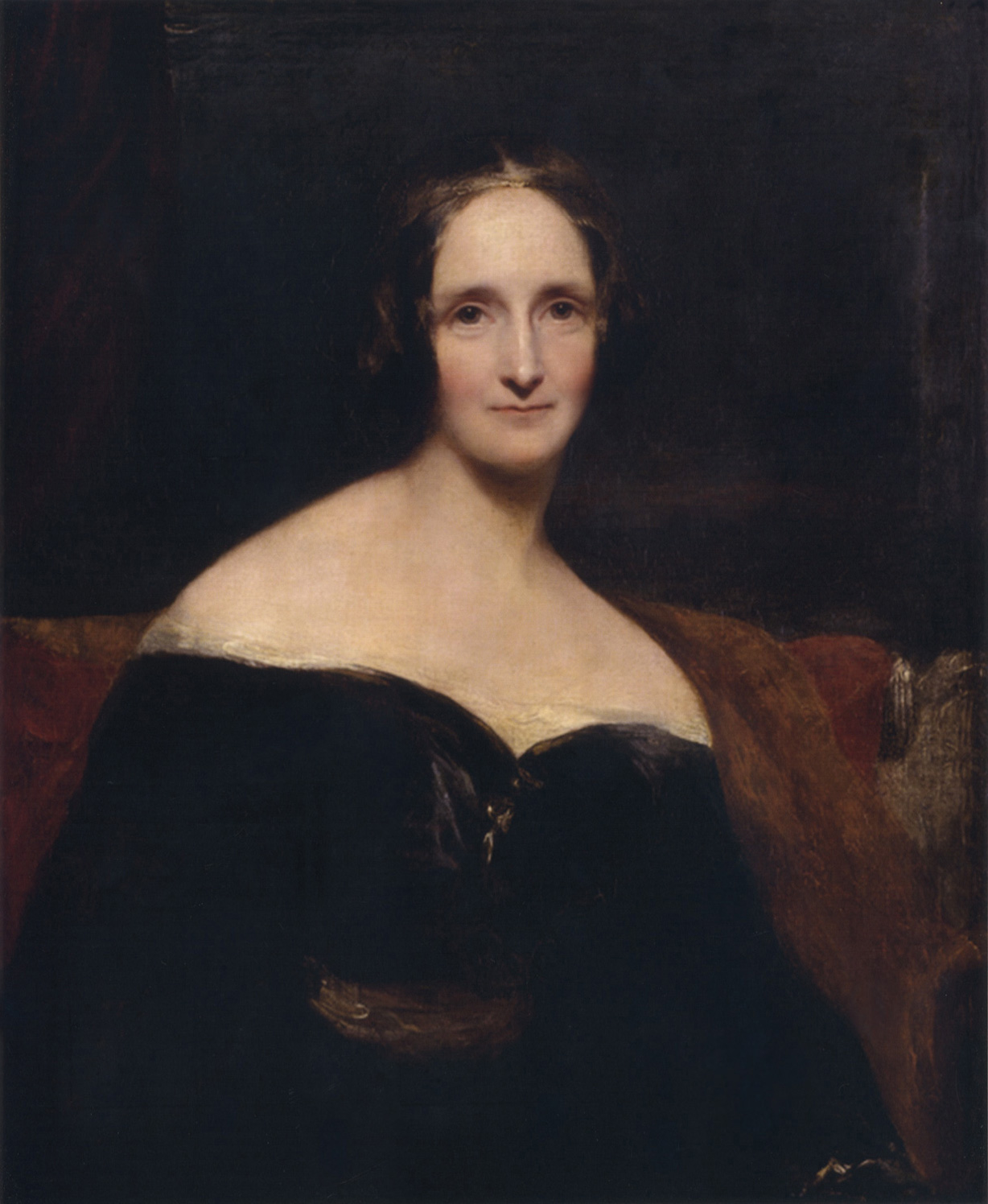
Mary Shelley

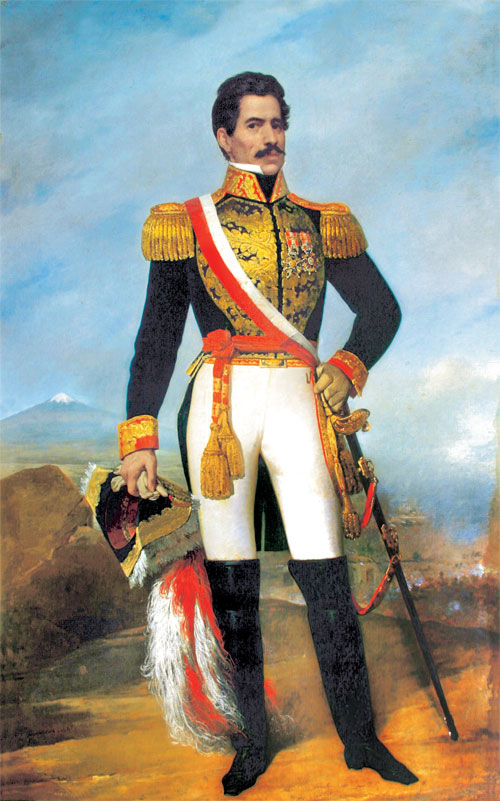
Ramón Castilla

- July 2
  - Maria Antonia Koháry de Csábrág, Hungarian noblewoman, ancestor of several European monarchs (d. 1862)
  - Pierre Joseph Michel Lorquin, French entomologist specializing in Coleoptera and Lepidoptera (d. 1873)
- July 4
  - Jacquette Löwenhielm, Swedish noble and lady-in-waiting (d. 1839)
  - James W. Parker, American pioneer, uncle of Cynthia Ann Parker and the great-uncle of Comanche Quanah Parker (d. 1864)
- July 6 – Henry Paget, 2nd Marquess of Anglesey, England (d. 1869)
- July 7 – George Meads, English professional cricketer who played first-class cricket (1825-1836) (d. 1881)
- July 11 – Francis Close, Anglican rector of Cheltenham (1826–1856) and Dean of Carlisle (1856–1881) (d. 1882)
- July 12
  - John Gaylord, early American Mormon leader (d. 1874)
  - Adele Schopenhauer, German author (d. 1849)
- July 14 – James Scott Bowerbank, British naturalist, palaeontologist (d. 1877)
- July 15
  - Kloka Anna, Swedish cunning woman, medium (d. 1860)
  - Lucius Quintus Cincinnatus Lamar I, attorney, jurist in his native Georgia (d. 1834)
  - Pier Alessandro Paravia, Venetian writer, scholar, philanthropist, professor of Italian eloquence (d. 1857)
- July 16 – Daniel D. Barnard, American politician, Representative from New York (d. 1861)
- July 17
  - Paul Delaroche, French painter (d. 1856)
  - William Matthew Harries, influential member of both houses of the Parliament of the Cape of Good Hope (d. 1865)
  - John Hodgetts-Foley, British Member of Parliament (d. 1861)
- July 18 – Robert Christison, Scottish toxicologist, physician (d. 1882)
- July 20
  - Gotthard Fritzsche, Prussian-Australian pastor (d. 1863)
  - Eli Kirk Price, Philadelphia lawyer (d. 1884)
  - Sir Paweł Strzelecki, Polish explorer, geologist (d. 1873)
- July 21 – John M. Read, American lawyer (d. 1874)
- July 24 – Maria Foote, English actress, peeress (d. 1867)
- July 25
  - Princess Augusta of Hesse-Kassel (d. 1889)
  - Nicholas Marcellus Hentz, French American educator, arachnologist (d. 1856)
  - Nehemiah Platt, American politician from New York (d. 1851)
- July 26
  - William Bulkeley Hughes, Welsh politician (d. 1882)
  - William Gore Ouseley, British diplomat serving in various roles in Washington (d. 1866)
  - William Ranwell, English marine painter (d. 1861)
- July 29
  - François Bourdon, French engineer, inventor (d. 1865)
  - Daniel Drew, American businessman (d. 1879)
  - Beverly R. Wellford, American physician (d. 1870)
- July 30 – Harriet Windsor-Clive, 13th Baroness Windsor of England (d. 1869)
- July 31 – Alonzo C. Paige, American lawyer, politician from New York (d. 1868)
- August 1
  - Joseph Gensoul, French surgeon (d. 1858)
  - William Thomas Knollys, British Army General (d. 1883)
- August 2
  - John Brown, English geographer (d. 1861)
  - William Gibson-Craig, Scottish advocate, politician (d. 1878)
  - Amédée Thierry, French journalist, historian (d. 1873)
- August 4
  - William S. Hamilton, American politician, miner (d. 1850)
  - Benjamin F. H. Witherell, Michigan jurist (d. 1867)
- August 5
  - Cayetano Heredia, Peruvian physician (d. 1861)
  - Friedrich August Kummer, German violoncellist, pedagogue and composer (d. 1879)
- August 6 – August Wilhelm Stiehler, German government official, paleobotanist (d. 1878)
- August 7
  - James Kānehoa, member of the court of King Kamehameha II and Kamehameha III during the Kingdom of Hawaii (d. 1851)
  - Justin von Linde, German jurist, statesman from the Grand Duchy of Hesse (d. 1870)
- August 8
  - George Peck, American Methodist clergyman (d. 1876)
  - Joseph-Nicolas Robert-Fleury, French painter (d. 1890)
  - George Rykert, Upper Canada businessman, surveyor and political figure (d. 1857)
  - William Walker, Quebec lawyer, political figure (d. 1844)
- August 9
  - Charles Allen, United States Representative from Massachusetts (d. 1869)
  - Charles Robert Malden, British naval officer (d. 1855)
  - Christian Wilhelm Niedner, German church historian, theologian (d. 1865)
  - Archibald Yell, American politician, Representative from Arkansas (d. 1847)
- August 10
  - Guillaume Louis Cottrau, French composer, music publisher (d. 1847)
  - Carl Gustaf Mannerheim, Finnish entomologist, governor of the Viipuri province in the Grand Duchy of Finland (d. 1854)
  - John M. Patton, Virginia politician, lawyer (d. 1858)
  - Joseph Gerhard Zuccarini, German botanist (d. 1848)
- August 11 – George Shillibeer, English coachbuilder (d. 1866)
- August 12 – Manuel Aguilar Chacón, Costa Rican head of state (d. 1846)
- August 13 – Horatio Chriesman, American surveyor, politician in Mexican Texas and participant in the Texas Revolution (d. 1878)
- August 14 – Robert Radcliffe, English first-class cricketer associated with Cambridge University (d. 1832)
- August 15 – James Black, Scottish-born Canadian clergyman (d. 1886)
- August 17 – Peter Broun, first Colonial Secretary of Western Australia (d. 1846)
- August 18 – Antoine Claudet, French photographer, artist who produced daguerreotypes (d. 1867)
- August 20
  - Johan Frederik Møller, Danish painter, photographer (d. 1882)
  - John Sinclair, Archdeacon of Middlesex (d. 1875)
  - Francesco Zantedeschi, Italian priest, physicist (d. 1873)
- August 21
  - Chauncey J. Fox, American politician from New York (d. 1883)
  - John Montagu, Indian-born Tasmanian colonial secretary (d. 1853)
  - John Iltyd Nicholl, Welsh Member of Parliament (d. 1853)
- August 22
  - Augustin-Magloire Blanchet, French Canadian Catholic prelate in the Pacific Northwest (d. 1887)
  - Thomas Dale, British priest in the Church of England, Dean of Rochester (d. 1870)
- August 23 – Adhémar Jean Claude Barré de Saint-Venant, French mechanic, mathematician (d. 1886)
- August 24
  - John Cobbold, British brewer, railway developer and Conservative Party politician (d. 1882)
  - Laufilitonga, 39th and last Tuokinai of Tonga (d. 1865)
- August 25
  - John P. Bigelow, American politician (d. 1872)
  - Henrik Hertz, Danish poet (d. 1870)
- August 26
  - Innocent of Alaska, Russian Orthodox missionary priest (d. 1879)
  - Sheldon Peck, American folk artist (d. 1869)
- August 27
  - John Bathurst Deane, South African-born English clergyman, schoolmaster, antiquary and author (d. 1887)
  - Edwin James, American botanist (d. 1861)
- August 28
  - Ferenc Duschek, Hungarian politician (d. 1872)
  - Karl Otfried Müller, German scholar, philodorian (d. 1840)
- August 30 – Mary Wollstonecraft Shelley, English novelist, dramatist, essayist, biographer and travel writer (d. 1851)
- August 31
  - Philipp von Brunnow, Russian diplomat (d. 1875)
  - Ramón Castilla, Peruvian military leader and politician, three times President of Peru (d. 1867)
  - James Ferguson, Scottish-born American astronomer and engineer (d. 1867)
- September 1 – William FitzGerald-de Ros, 23rd Baron de Ros of England (d. 1874)
- September 3 – Benjamin Nottingham Webster, English actor-manager and dramatist (d. 1882)
- September 4
  - Alvan Cullom, American politician, Representative from Tennessee (d. 1877)
  - Raynold Kaufgetz, Swiss soldier (d. 1869)
- September 5
  - Francis H. Cone, Associate Justice of the Supreme Court of Georgia (U (d. 1859)
  - John Blennerhassett Martin, American painter (d. 1857)
  - William Ruggles, professor at George Washington University (d. 1877)
- September 6
  - William Smith, lawyer, congressman, Governor of Virginia, Major General during the American Civil War (d. 1887)
  - Jenny Vertpré, French stage actress (d. 1865)
- September 7
  - Louis Vulliemin, Swiss theologian, historian (d. 1897)
  - Per Erik Wallqvist, Swedish ballet dancer, ballet master (d. 1855)
- September 10
  - Benjamin Nicolas Marie Appert, French philanthropist (d. 1847)
  - Franz Krüger, German (Prussian) painter, lithographer (d. 1857)
  - Daniel Parkhurst Leadbetter, United States Representative from Ohio (d. 1870)
  - Carl Gustaf Mosander, Swedish chemist (d. 1858)
  - Piotr Wysocki, Polish lieutenant, leader of the Polish conspiracy against Russian Tsar Nicolas I (d. 1875)
- September 11 – George Strange Boulton, Upper Canada lawyer, political figure (d. 1869)
- September 12
  - Jacob Barit, Russian Talmudist, communal worker (d. 1883)
  - George Barrell Emerson, American educator, pioneer of women's education (d. 1881)
  - Samuel Joseph May, American reformer (d. 1871)
  - Samuel McLean, United States Consul for Trinidad (d. 1881)
- September 13 – Joseph Stannard, English marine and landscape painter (d. 1830)
- September 14 – Joseph-Désiré Court, French painter of historical subjects and portraits (d. 1865)
- September 15 – Andrew Trumbo, United States Representative from Kentucky (d. 1871)
- September 16
  - Levi Silliman Ives, American theologian, bishop (d. 1867)
  - Samuel Milford, English-born Australian barrister, judge (d. 1865)
  - Anthony Panizzi, Italian-born British librarian, head of the British Museum (d. 1879)
  - Johann Friedrich Ludwig Wöhlert, German businessman (d. 1877)
- September 17
  - Eugène Defacqz, Belgian liberal politician, magistrate (d. 1871)
  - Heinrich Kuhl, German naturalist, zoologist (d. 1821)
- September 18 – Camille-Melchior Gibert, French dermatologist (d. 1866)
- September 19 – January Suchodolski, Polish painter, Army officer (d. 1875)
- September 21
  - George Hamilton Seymour, British diplomat (d. 1880)
  - John Talbot, Irish-born Canadian schoolmaster (d. 1874)
- September 23
  - Johannes Henrik Berg, Norwegian politician (d. 1886)
  - Charles Brown, Democratic member of the U.S. House of Representatives from Pennsylvania (d. 1883)
  - Thomas H. Rochester, 6th son of Colonel Nathaniel Rochester, 6th mayor of Rochester (d. 1874)
- September 24 – Carl Peter Wilhelm Gramberg, German theologian, biblical scholar (d. 1830)
- September 25 – John J. Allen, Virginia lawyer (d. 1871)
- September 26 – Olry Terquem, French pharmacist, paleontologist (d. 1887)
- September 27
  - Édouard Frère, French bookseller (d. 1874)
  - Jacob von der Lippe, Norwegian politician, Bishop of the Diocese of Christianssand (d. 1878)
- September 28
  - Sophie von Knorring, Swedish novelist, noble (d. 1848)
  - Caroline LeRoy, second wife of American author Daniel Webster (d. 1882)
  - Aimée Caroillon des Tillières, wealthy French heiress, saloniste during the July Monarchy (d. 1862)
- September 29
  - Percy Nugent, Irish politician (d. 1874)
  - Joseph Thompson, early settler of Atlanta, Georgia (d. 1885)

=== October–December ===
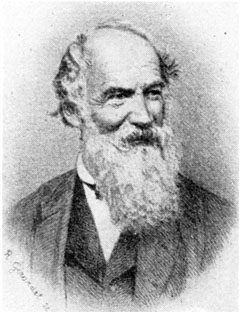
Philippe Suchard

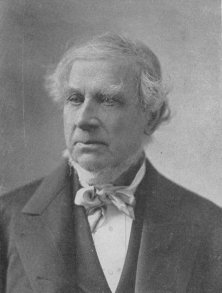
Thurlow Weed

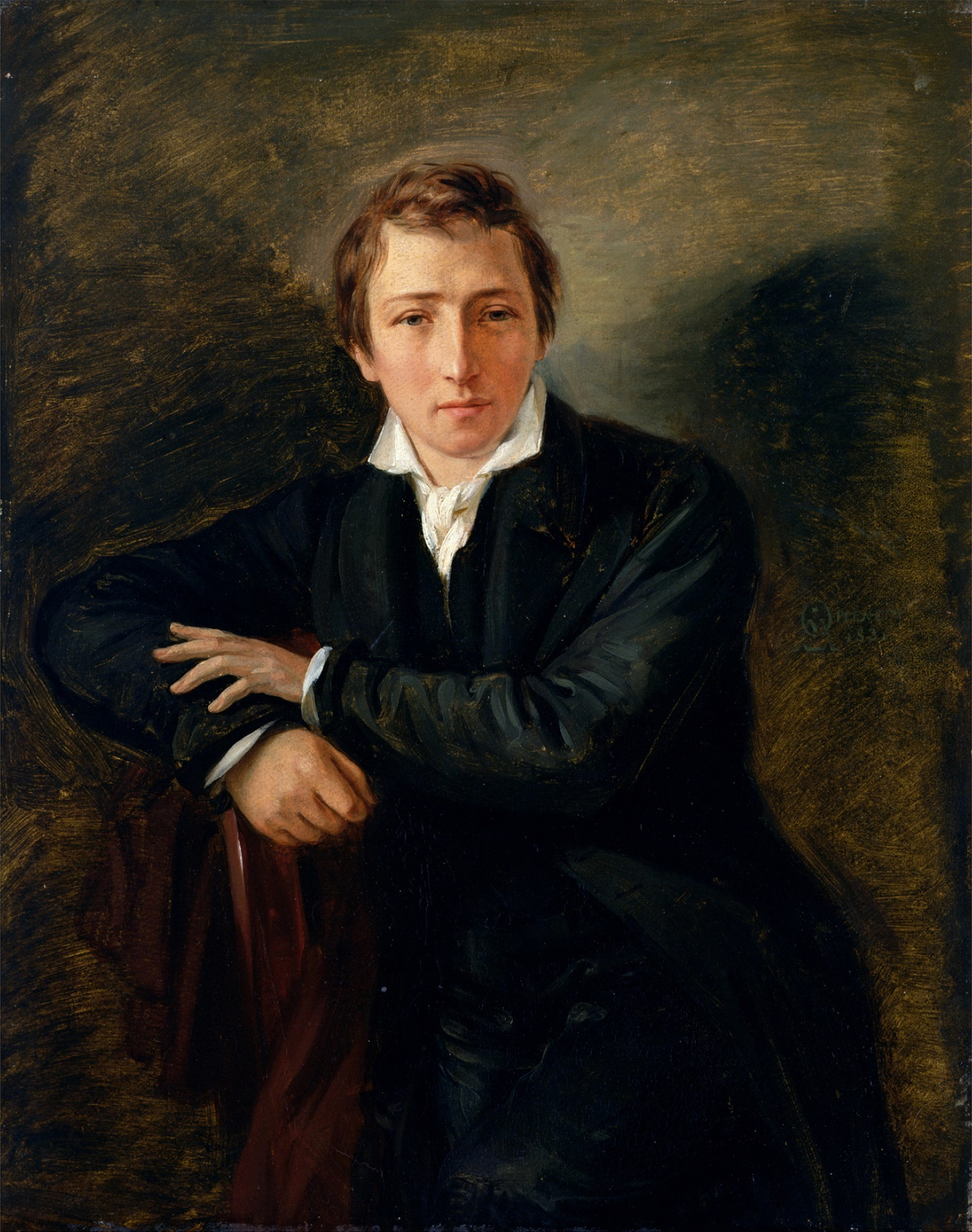
Heinrich Heine

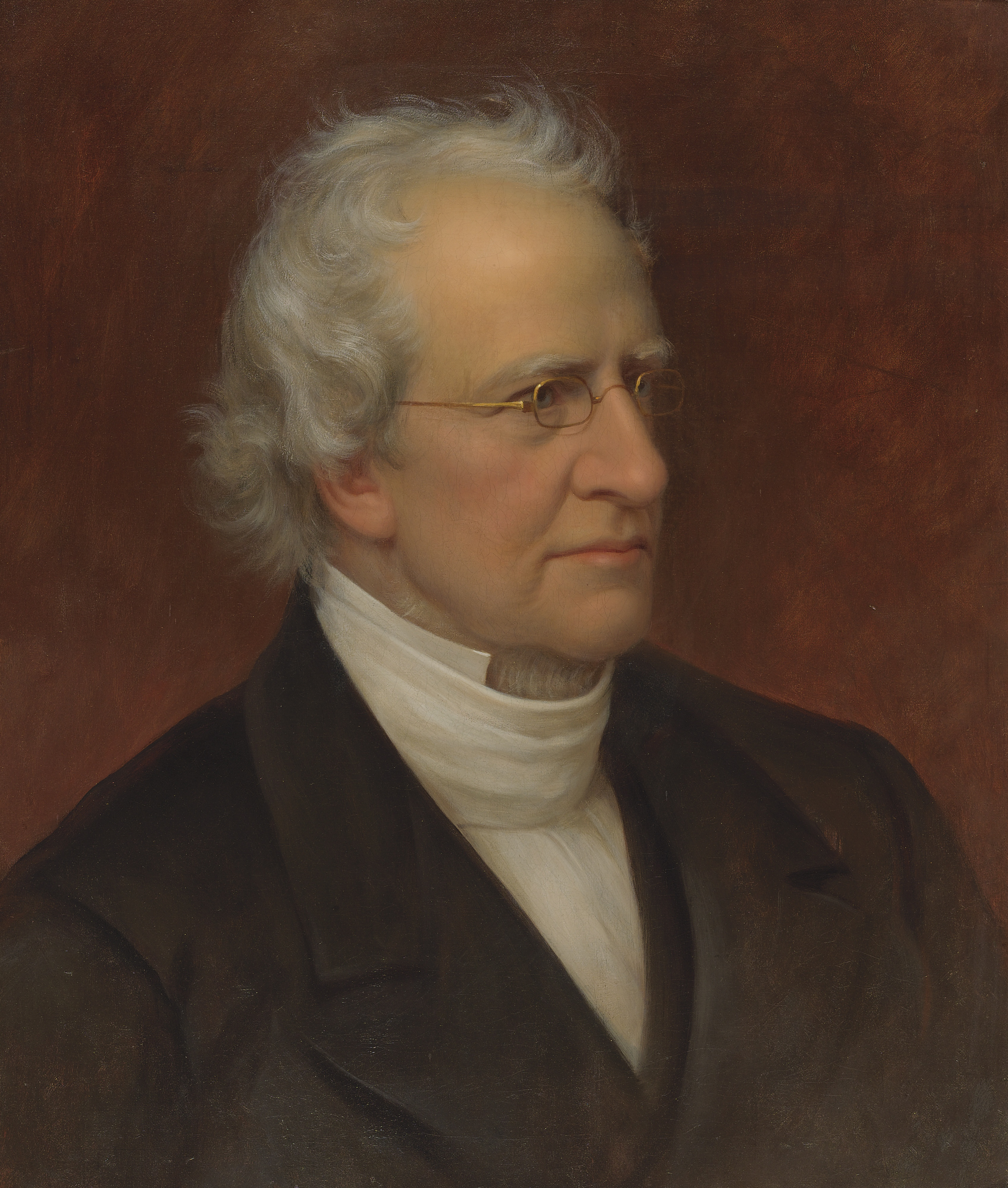
Charles Hodge

- October 1 – Lewis Ruffner, salt manufacturer from Malden, West Virginia (d. 1883)
- October 2 – Jonathan Pitney, American physician, promoter of Absecon Island as healing seashore resort (d. 1889)
- October 3
  - Knud Ibsen, father of Norwegian playwright Henrik Ibsen (d. 1877)
  - Leopold II, Grand Duke of Tuscany (d. 1870)
  - Hopkins L. Turney, Democratic United States Representative from Tennessee (d. 1857)
- October 4
  - Jeremias Gotthelf, Swiss novelist (d. 1854)
  - Charles-Séraphin Rodier, Canadian merchant (d. 1876)
- October 5 – John Gardner Wilkinson, English traveller, writer and pioneer Egyptologist (d. 1875)
- October 6
  - Albrecht Elof Ihre, Swedish diplomat, Swedish-Norwegian prime minister of foreign affairs (d. 1877)
  - Charles Panet, lawyer and political figure in Quebec (d. 1877)
  - Joseph Othmar Rauscher, Austrian Prince-Archbishop of Vienna and cardinal (d. 1875)
- October 7 – Peter Georg Bang, Danish politician, jurist (d. 1861)
- October 8
  - William H. DeLancey, American Episcopal bishop (d. 1865)
  - Ludwig Förster, German-born Austrian architect (d. 1863)
  - Charles Knapp, United States Representative from New York (d. 1880)
  - William Thomasson, United States Representative from Kentucky (d. 1882)
- October 9
  - Thomas Boutillier, Quebec doctor, political figure (d. 1861)
  - Henry Collen, English miniature portrait painter to Queen Victoria of the United Kingdom and the Duchess of Kent (d. 1879)
  - Philippe Suchard, Swiss chocolatier, industrialist (d. 1884)
- October 10
  - August Heinrich Hermann von Dönhoff, Prussian diplomat (d. 1874)
  - Thomas Drummond, British army officer, civil engineer, senior public official (d. 1840)
- October 12 – Gaspard Thémistocle Lestiboudois, French naturalist (d. 1876)
- October 13
  - George Anson, British military officer, Whig politician (d. 1857)
  - Thomas Haynes Bayly, English poet (d. 1839)
  - Dong Haichuan, Chinese martial artist, credited to be the founder of Baguazhang (d. 1882)
  - John H. McHenry, United States House of Representatives (d. 1871)
  - William Motherwell, Scottish poet, antiquary and journalist (d. 1835)
- October 14
  - Jean Crespon, French zoologist and naturalist (d. 1857)
  - Ida Laura Pfeiffer, Austrian traveler and travel book author (d. 1858)
- October 15
  - Johann Gottlieb Fleischer, German botanist and ornithologist (d. 1838)
  - Karl Wilhelm Ludwig Heyse, German philologist (d. 1855)
  - William Siborne, British officer and military historian whose most notable work was a history of the Waterloo Campaign (d. 1849)
- October 16 – James Brudenell, 7th Earl of Cardigan (d. 1868)
- October 17
  - Mario Aspa, Italian composer (d. 1868)
  - Juan Lavalle, Argentine military and political figure (d. 1841)
- October 18
  - Gallus Jacob Baumgartner, Swiss statesman and prominent federalist (d. 1869)
  - Alexandre Jacques François Brière de Boismont, French physician and psychiatrist (d. 1881)
- October 19 – Littleton Kirkpatrick, American Whig Party politician (d. 1859)
- October 20 – José Bernardo Escobar, interim President of Guatemala (d. 1849)
- October 21
  - Thomas M. Allen, clergyman who played a prominent role in establishing the Christian Church in Missouri (d. 1871)
  - William Hale, British inventor (d. 1870)
- October 23 – Jan Jacob Rochussen, Governor-General of the Dutch East Indies (d. 1871)
- October 24 – Štefan Moyses, Slovak bishop, teacher, patriot, co-founder and first chairman of Matica slovenská (d. 1869)
- October 25
  - Crispino Agostinucci, Italian Catholic bishop (d. 1856)
  - Thomas Shuldham O'Halloran, first Police Commissioner and first Police Magistrate of South Australia (d. 1870)
- October 26
  - Johann Adam Philipp Hepp, German physician, lichenologist (d. 1867)
  - Luther Severance, United States Representative, diplomat from Maine (d. 1855)
  - Antoine-Charles Taschereau, Quebec official, political figure (d. 1862)
- October 27 – Andrew Combe, Scottish physician, phrenologist (d. 1847)
- October 28 – James C. Curtis, American lawyer, politician (d. 1881)
- October 30
  - Princess Henrietta of Nassau-Weilburg (d. 1829)
  - Lott Warren, United States Representative from Georgia (U (d. 1861)
- October 31 – Benjamin H. Smith, American politician from Virginia (d. 1887)
- November 1
  - María Santos Corrales, inspiration of Peru's famous poet and patriot soldier (d. 1881)
  - Michael Loam, British (Cornish) engineer, introduced the first man engine to carry men up and down a mine shaft into the UK (d. 1871)
  - Sir Hedworth Williamson, 7th Baronet of England (d. 1861)
- November 2 – Baltazar Mathias Keilhau, Norwegian geologist, mountain pioneer (d. 1858)
- November 3 – Thomas Icely, early colonial New South Wales landholder, stockbreeder (d. 1874)
- November 4 – Carlo Blasis, Italian dancer (d. 1878)
- November 5 – Elisha H. Groves, mid-level American LDS Church leader (d. 1867)
- November 6 – Gabriel Andral, French pathologist, professor at the University of Paris (d. 1876)
- November 13 – Niklas Westring, Swedish entomologist, arachnologist (d. 1882)
- November 14
  - Moses M. Haarbleicher, German-Jewish poet, critic (d. 1869)
  - Tilghman Howard, U.S. Representative from Indiana (d. 1844)
  - Charles Lyell, Scottish geologist (d. 1875)
  - Justus Radius, German pathologist, ophthalmologist (d. 1884)
- November 15
  - Leopold von Sonnleithner, Austrian lawyer (d. 1873)
  - Thurlow Weed, New York newspaper publisher, Whig and Republican politician (d. 1882)
- November 17 – Isaac Funk, American rancher and politician (d. 1865)
- November 18 – Carl Reinhold Roth, Swedish businessman, ironmaster (d. 1858)
- November 19
  - Charles Anthon, American classical scholar (d. 1867)
  - John Crenshaw, American landowner (d. 1871)
  - Jesse Crowell, pioneer settler in Michigan (d. 1872)
- November 20
  - Mary Buckland, English palaeontologist, marine biologist and scientific illustrator (d. 1857)
  - María de los Remedios de Escalada, wife of the leader of the Argentine War of Independence (d. 1823)
- November 21 – Anders Josef Europaeus, Finnish priest, vicar (d. 1870)
- November 22 – David Salomons, leading figure in the struggle for Jewish emancipation in the United Kingdom (d. 1873)
- November 23
  - Bertram Ashburnham, 4th Earl of Ashburnham, British peer (d. 1878)
  - Benjamin Hale, American educator, clergyman (d. 1863)
- November 27 – José Xavier de Cerveira e Sousa, Portuguese prelate (d. 1862)
- November 29
  - Albert Day, American politician, 27th Lieutenant Governor of Connecticut (d. 1876)
  - Gaetano Donizetti, Italian composer (d. 1848)
- November 30
  - Pierre-Martial Bardy, Lower Canada teacher, doctor and political figure (d. 1860)
  - Otto Vincent Lange, Norwegian politician (d. 1870)
- December 2 – Benjamin F. Hallett, Massachusetts lawyer, Democratic Party activist (d. 1862)
- December 3
  - Margaretta Morris, American entomologist (d. 1867)
  - Andrew Smith, Scottish surgeon, explorer, ethnologist and zoologist (d. 1872)
- December 4
  - Thomas Patterson Brockman, member of South Carolina Senate and House of Representatives (d. 1859)
  - George Tupou I, King of Tonga (d. 1893)
- December 5
  - Steen Andersen Bille, Danish vice-admiral and minister for the navy (d. 1883)
  - Eugène Soubeiran, French scientist (d. 1859)
- December 6
  - Károly Nagy, Hungarian astronomer (d. 1868)
  - Antoinette Henriette Clémence Robert, French writer of historical fiction (d. 1872)
- December 7 – Charles J. McCurdy, American lawyer (d. 1891)
- December 8 – Martin Martens, Belgian botanist, chemist (d. 1863)
- December 9
  - Michael Aikman, Lower Canada businessman, political figure (d. 1881)
  - Thomas Davee, United States Representative from Maine (d. 1841)
- December 10 – Raffaele Fidanza, Italian painter (d. 1846)
- December 11
  - Alfred Dockery, American Representative from North Carolina (d. 1875)
  - Hiram Paulding, Rear Admiral in the United States Navy (d. 1878)
- December 12
  - Lucy Anderson, English pianist (d. 1878)
  - Pierre Léonard Vander Linden, Belgian entomologist (d. 1831)
- December 13 – Heinrich Heine, German poet (d. 1856)
- December 14
  - Antonio Maria Cagiano de Azevedo, Catholic Cardinal, holder of significant legal positions in the church (d. 1867)
  - Emil Huschke, German anatomist, embryologist (d. 1858)
- December 15
  - Karl Friedrich Theodor Krause, German anatomist (d. 1868)
  - Joseph Lecompte, United States Representative from Kentucky (d. 1851)
  - Erik Røring Møinichen, Norwegian politician (d. 1875)
  - Andrew Tracy, American politician (d. 1868)
- December 17
  - Richard Cheslyn, English amateur cricketer who played first-class cricket (1825-1846) (d. 1858)
  - Joseph Henry, American scientist (d. 1878)
- December 18
  - August Friedrich Wilhelm Forchhammer, jurist, historian from the Duchy of Schleswig (d. 1870)
  - Dirk van Hogendorp, Dutch jurist (d. 1845)
- December 19 – Antoine Louis Dugès, French obstetrician, naturalist (d. 1838)
- December 22
  - Charles Fox, English Quaker scientist (d. 1878)
  - Thomas Manders, English actor-manager and low comedian (d. 1859)
  - William Benjamin Robinson, Upper Canada fur trader and political figure (d. 1873)
- December 23 – Adrien-Henri de Jussieu, French botanist (d. 1853)
- December 24
  - Robert Irwin Jr., American pioneer, territorial legislator (d. 1833)
  - Lewis Jones, British Royal Navy officer (d. 1895)
- December 25
  - Bernard Donald Macdonald, second Bishop of the Roman Catholic Diocese of Charlottetown, Prince Edward Island (d. 1859)
  - Joseph-Marie Quérard, French bibliographer (d. 1865)
- December 26
  - Enoch Cobb, Massachusetts farmer, businessman, philanthropist (d. 1876)
  - Johann Gustav Heckscher, German politician (d. 1865)
  - Thomas M. Pettit, United States lawyer (d. 1853)
  - Hans Skramstad, Norwegian pianist and composer (d. 1839)
- December 27
  - Mirza Beg Asadullah Khan (Mirza Ghalib), Indian poet (d.1868)
  - Domitila de Castro, Marchioness of Santos (d. 1867)
  - Charles Hodge, Presbyterian theologian, principal of Princeton Theological Seminary (1851-1878) (d. 1878)
  - Manuela Sáenz, Colombian national heroine (d. 1856)
- December 28
  - Rodolphus Dickinson, United States Representative from Ohio (d. 1849)
  - John Marshall, English politician (d. 1836)
- December 29 – François Leuret, French anatomist, psychiatrist (d. 1851)
- approximate date – Sojourner Truth, African-American abolitionist, women's rights activist (d. 1883)

1798

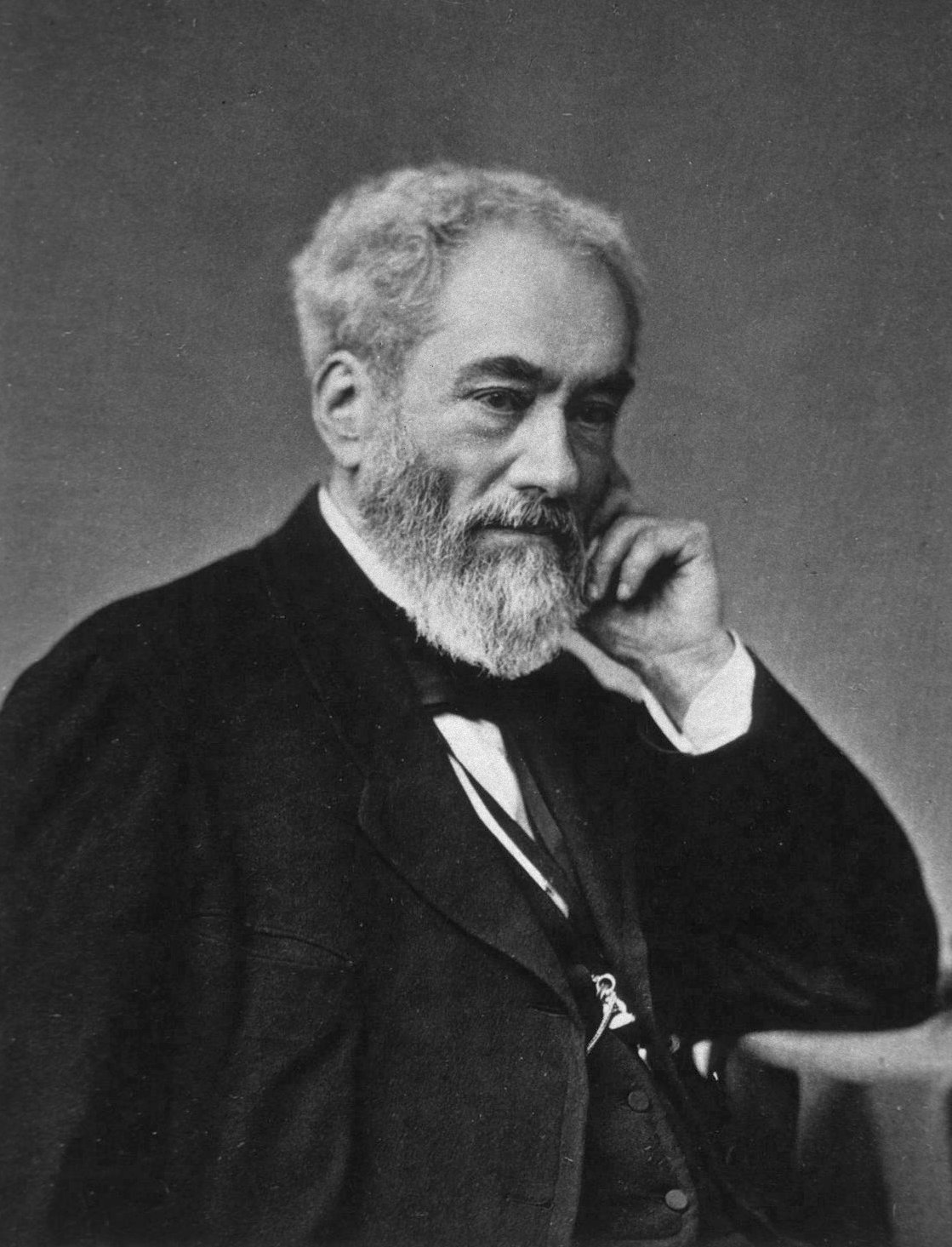
Robley Dunglison born 4 January

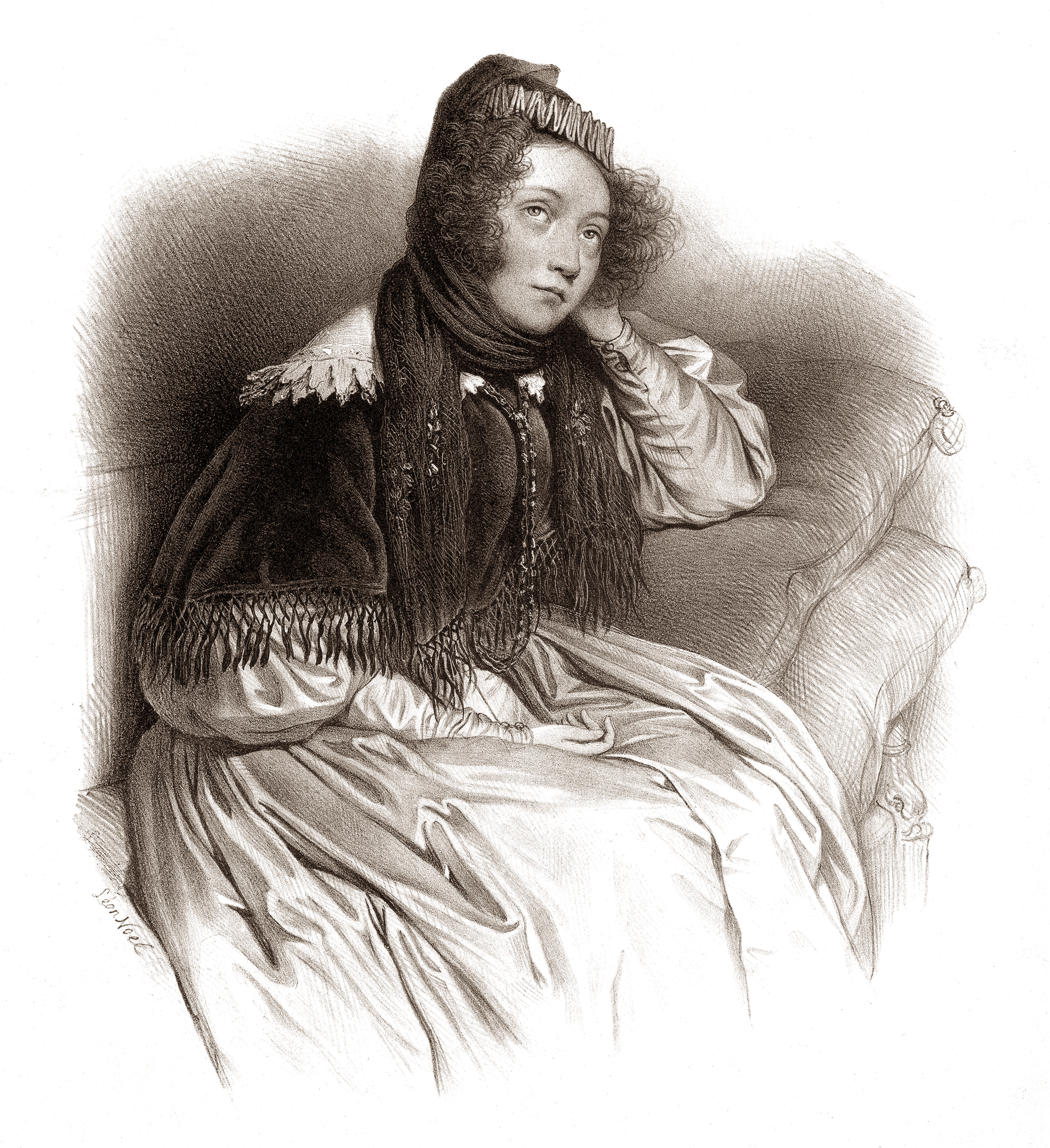
Marie Dorval born 6 January

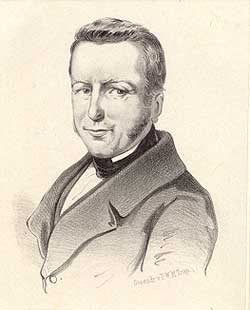
Isaac da Costa born 14 January

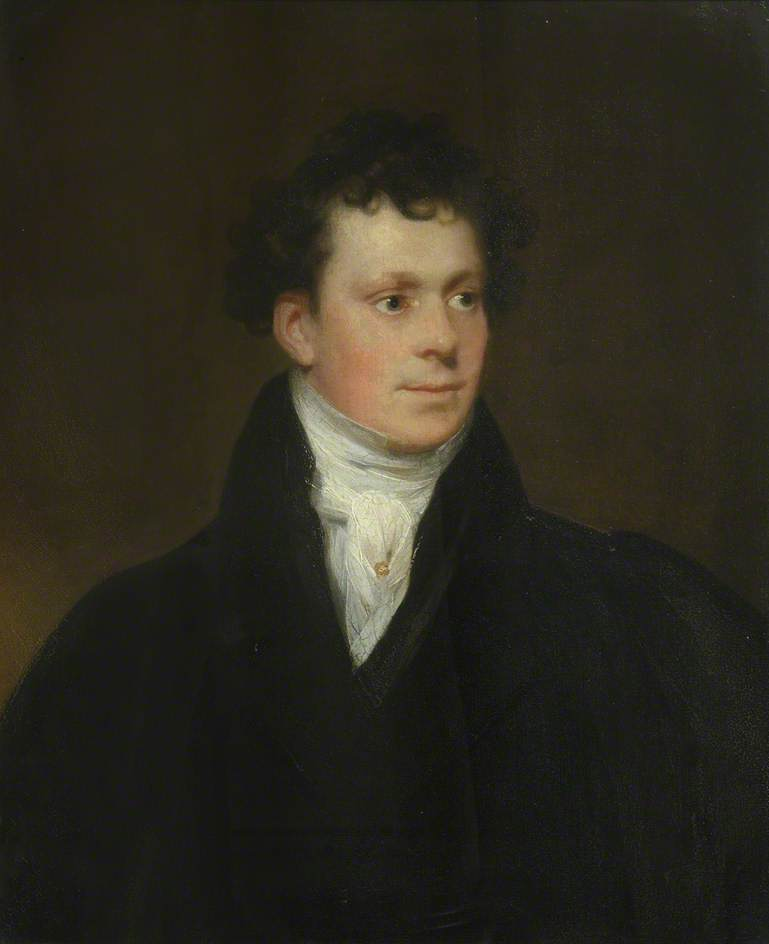
Joshua King born 16 January

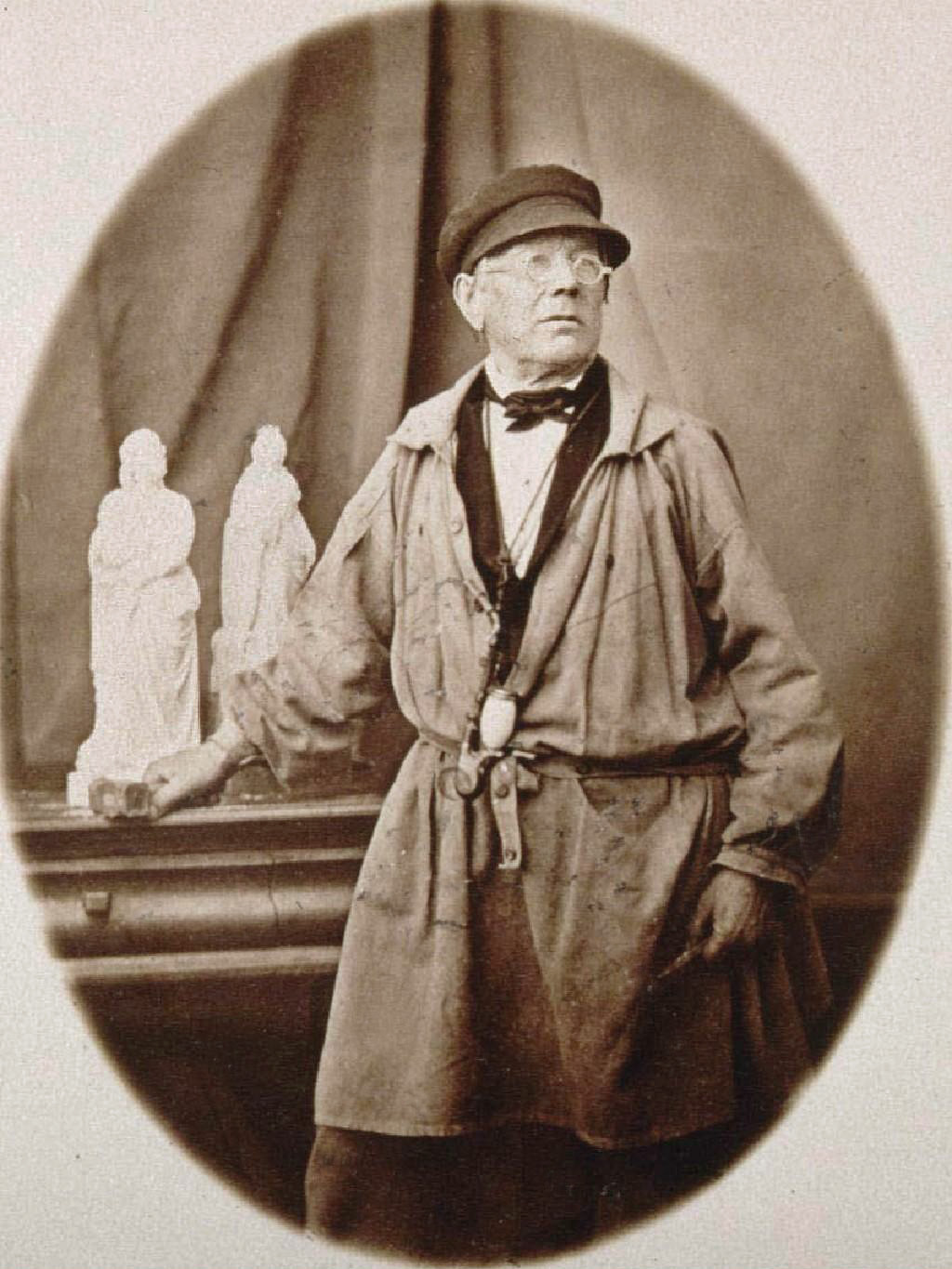
André Friedrich born 17 January

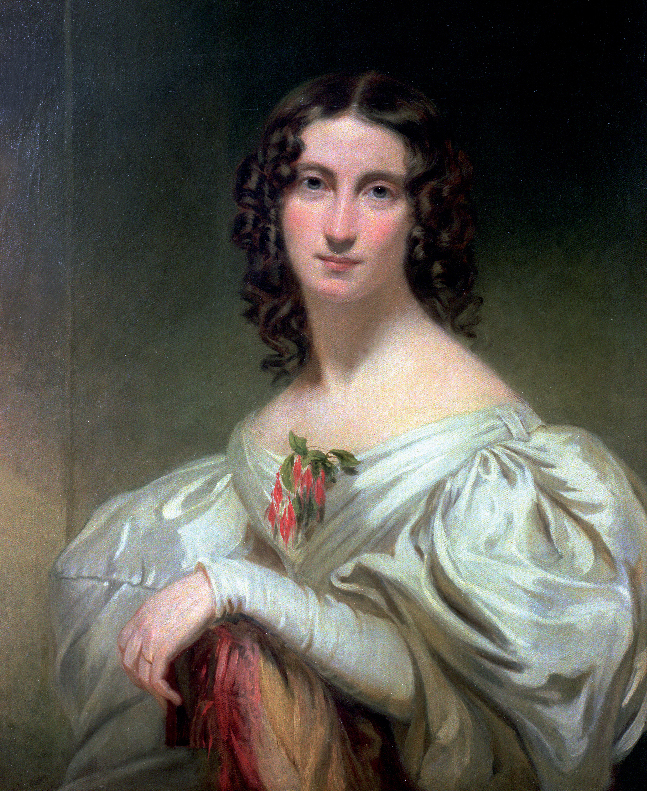
Jane Williams born 21 January

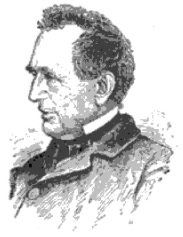
Charles Davies (professor) born 22 January

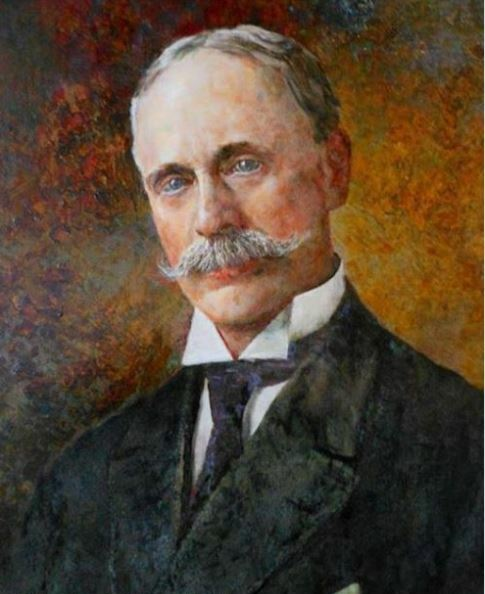
Henry Addison (mayor) born 24 January

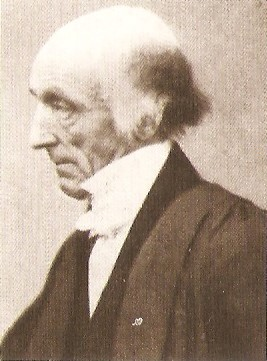
Richard William Jelf born 25 January

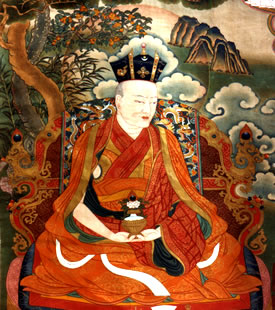
Thekchok Dorje, 14th Karmapa Lama born 27 January

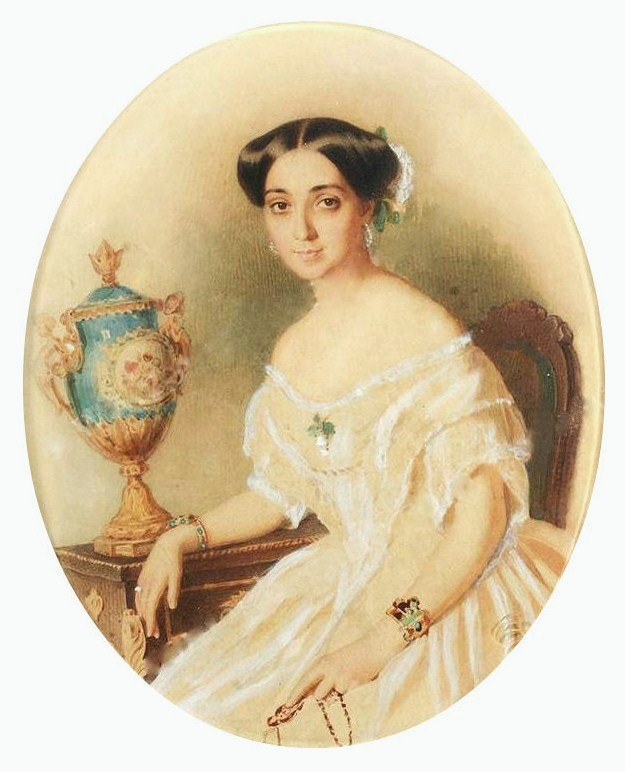
Ana Gruzinskaya Tolstaya born 31 January

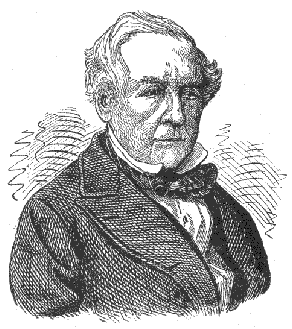
John Cochrane (chess player) born 4 February

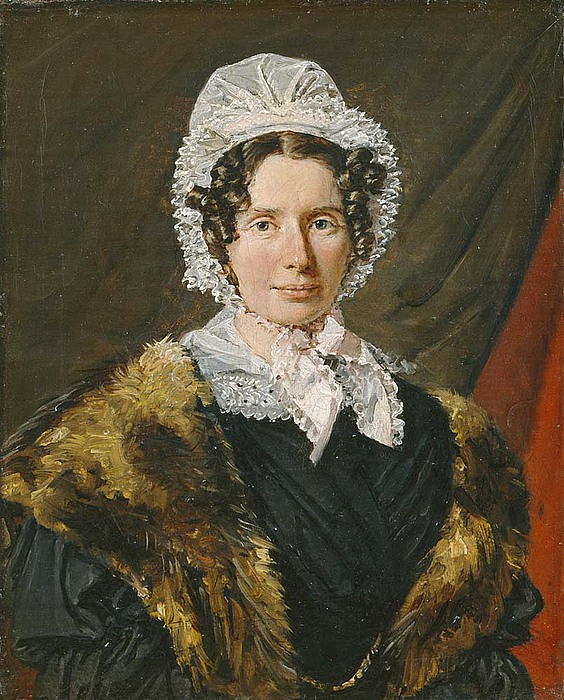
Bolette Puggaard born 7 February

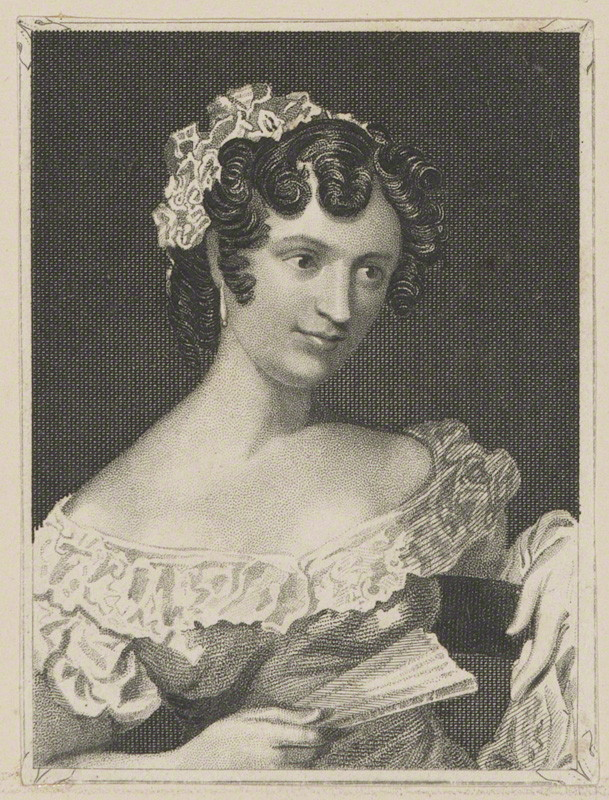
Harriet Waylett born 7 February

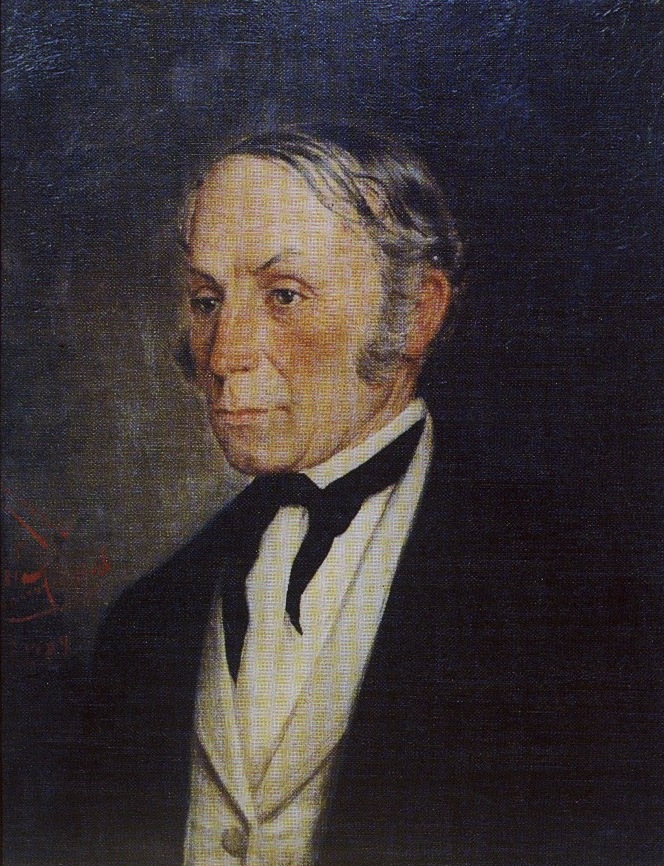
Johann Schroth born 11 February

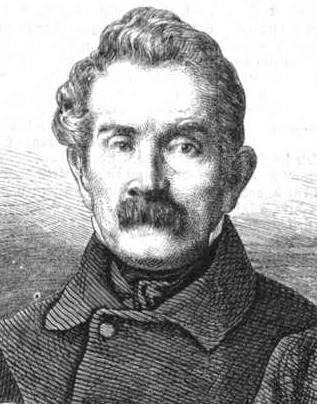
Heinrich Beitzke born 15 February

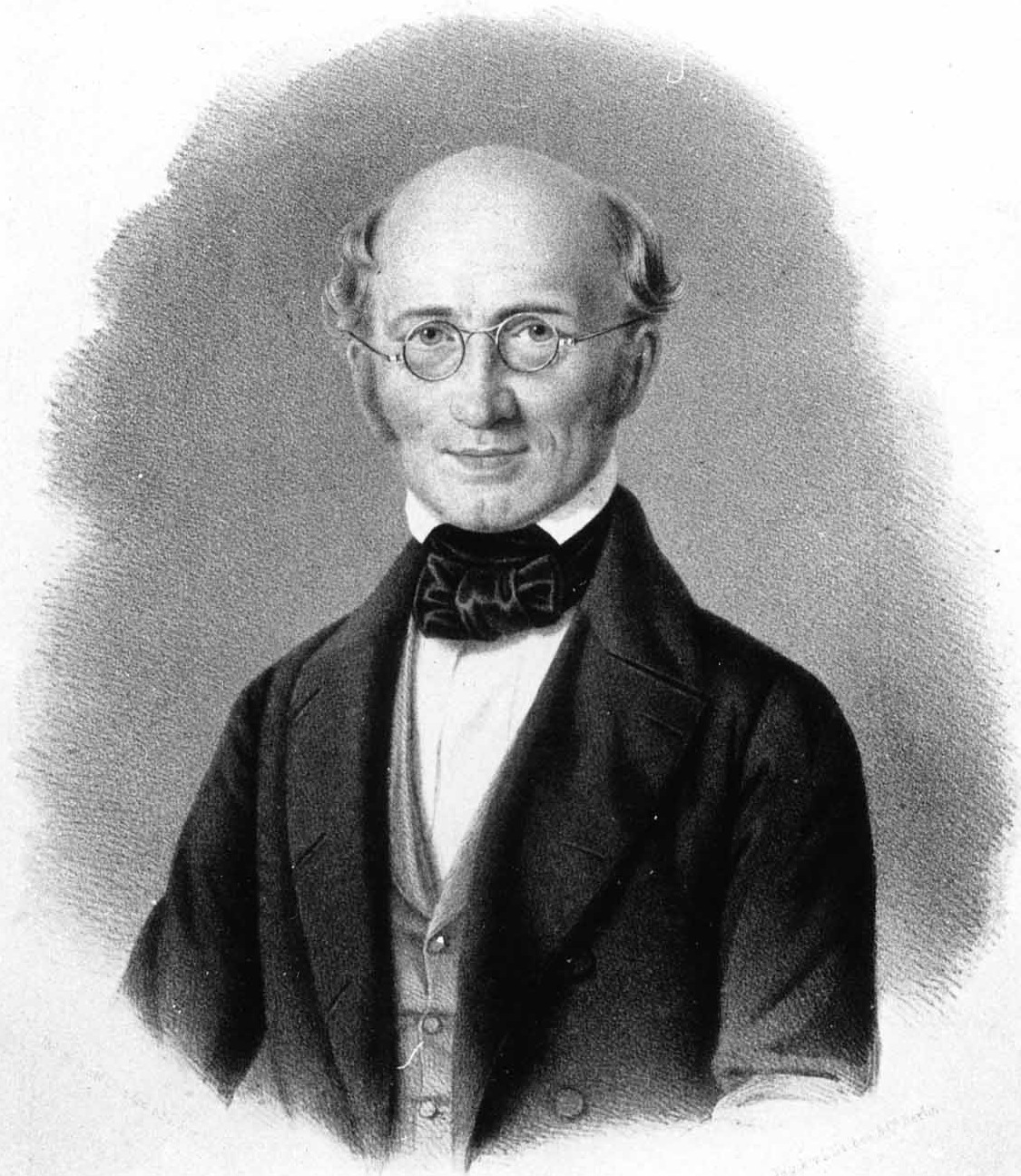
Friedrich Eduard Beneke born 17 February

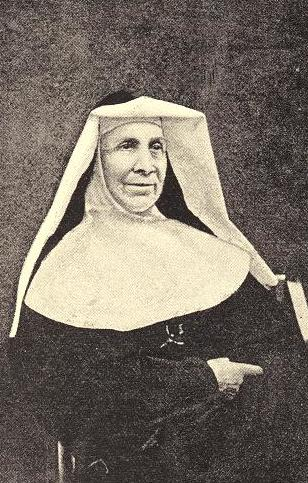
Ann Agnes Trail born 17 February

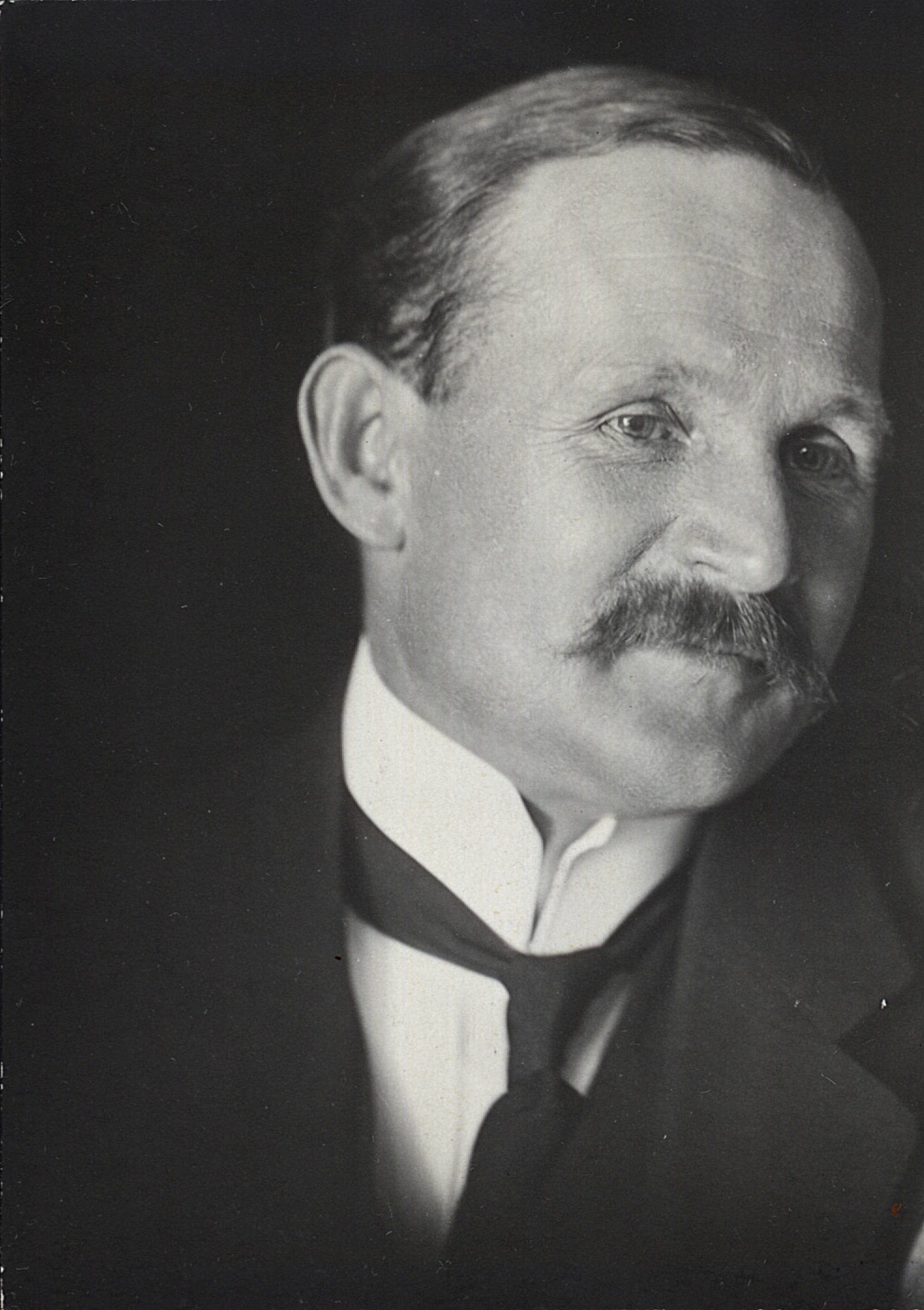
Johann Jakob Ulrich born 28 February

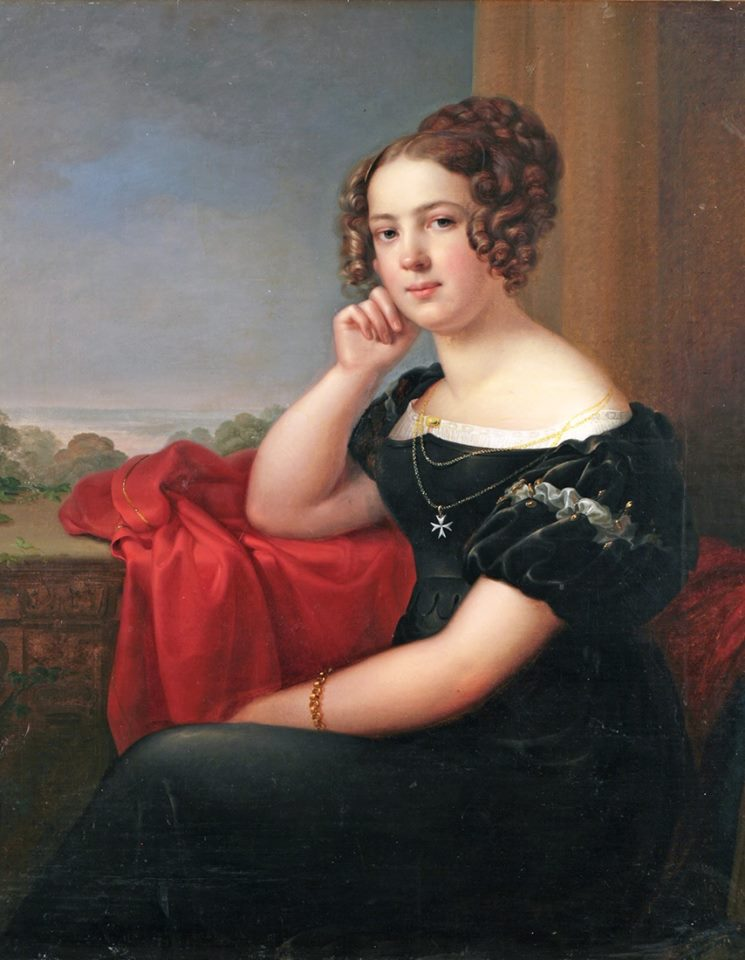
Princess Louise of Anhalt-Dessau born 1 March

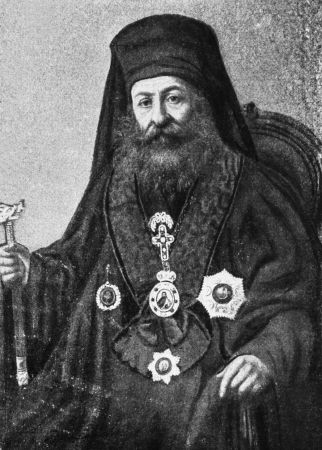
Gregory VI of Constantinople born 1 March

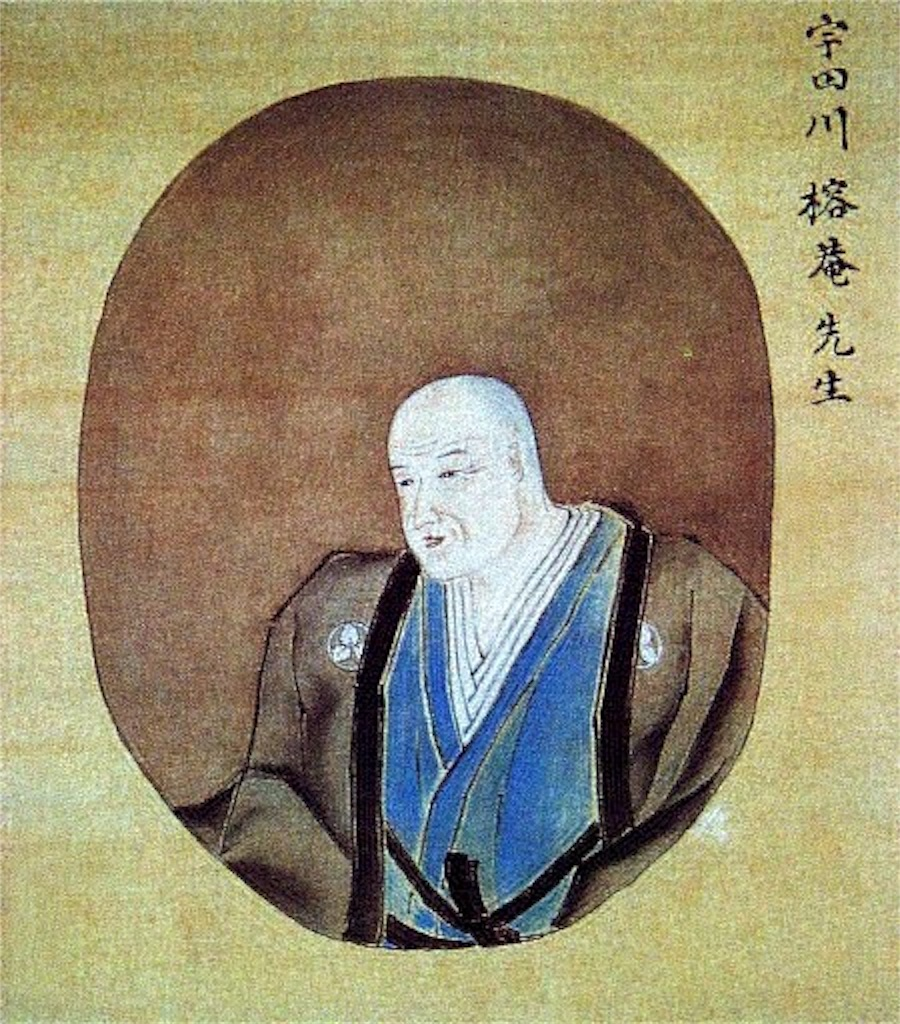
Udagawa Yōan born 9 March

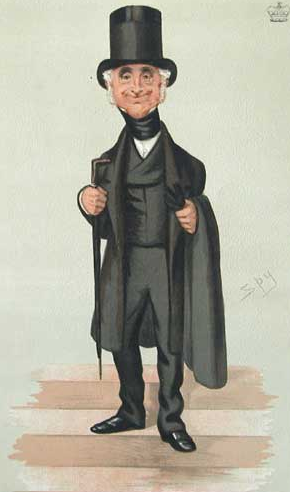
Thomas Fremantle, 1st Baron Cottesloe born 11 March

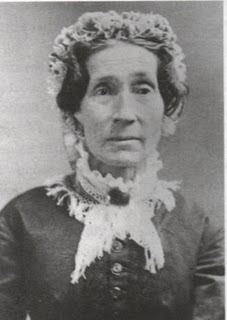
Elizabeth Goodridge born 12 March

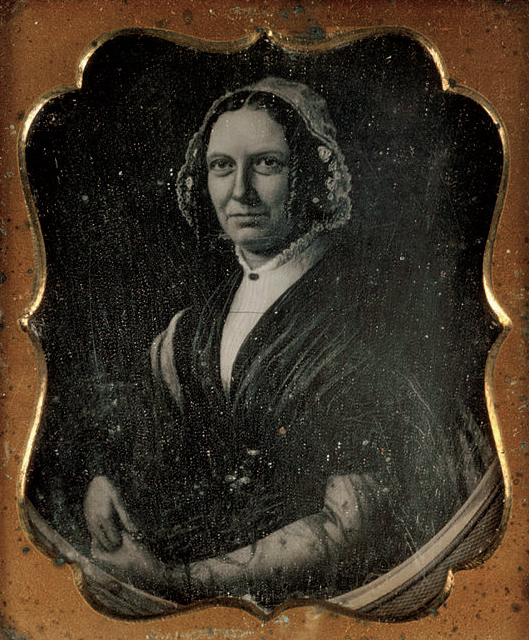
Abigail Fillmore born 13 March

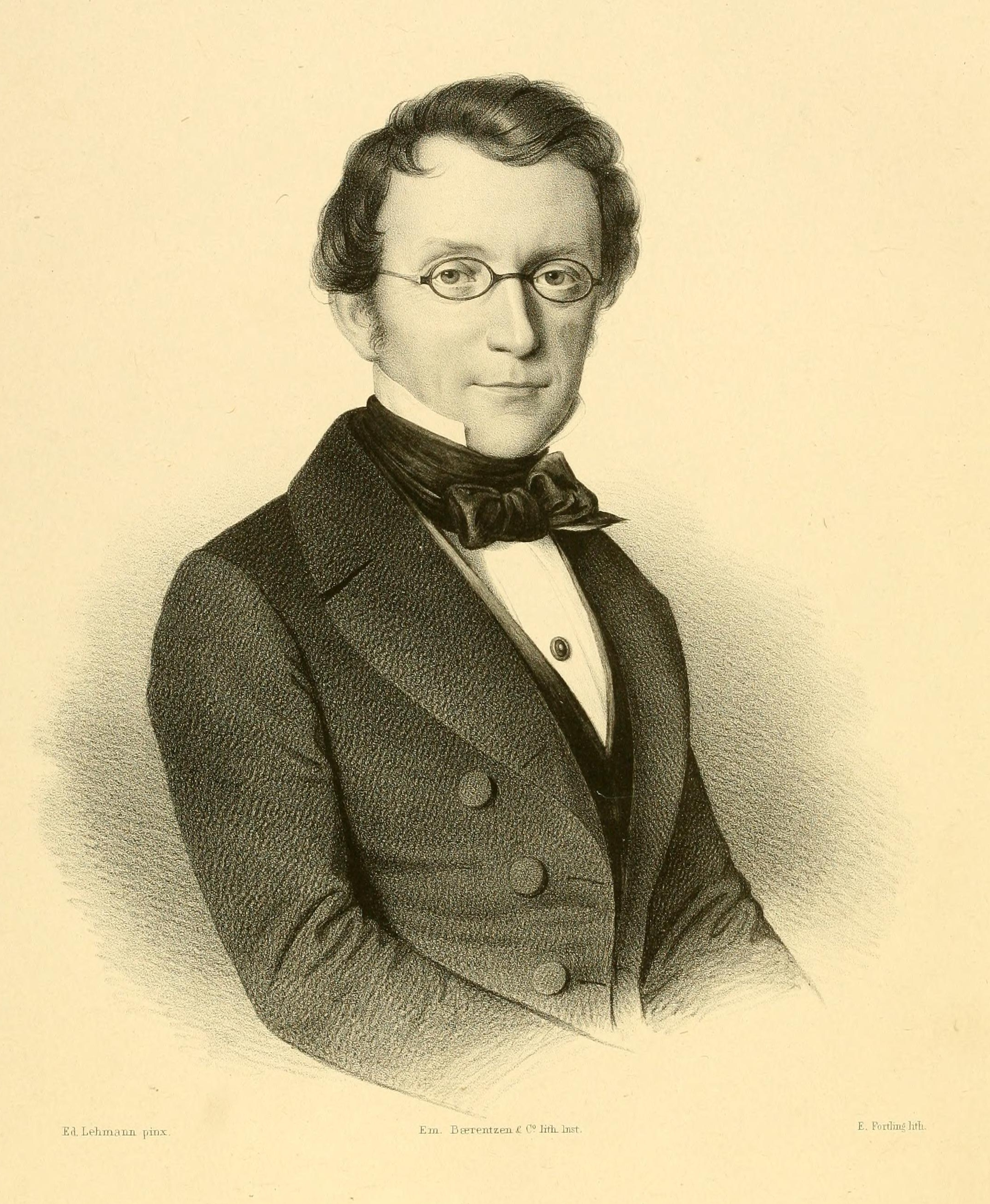
Daniel Frederik Eschricht born 18 March

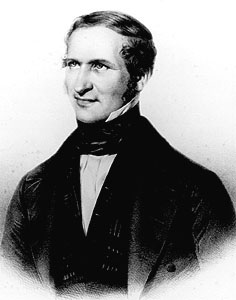
Gustav Rose born 18 March

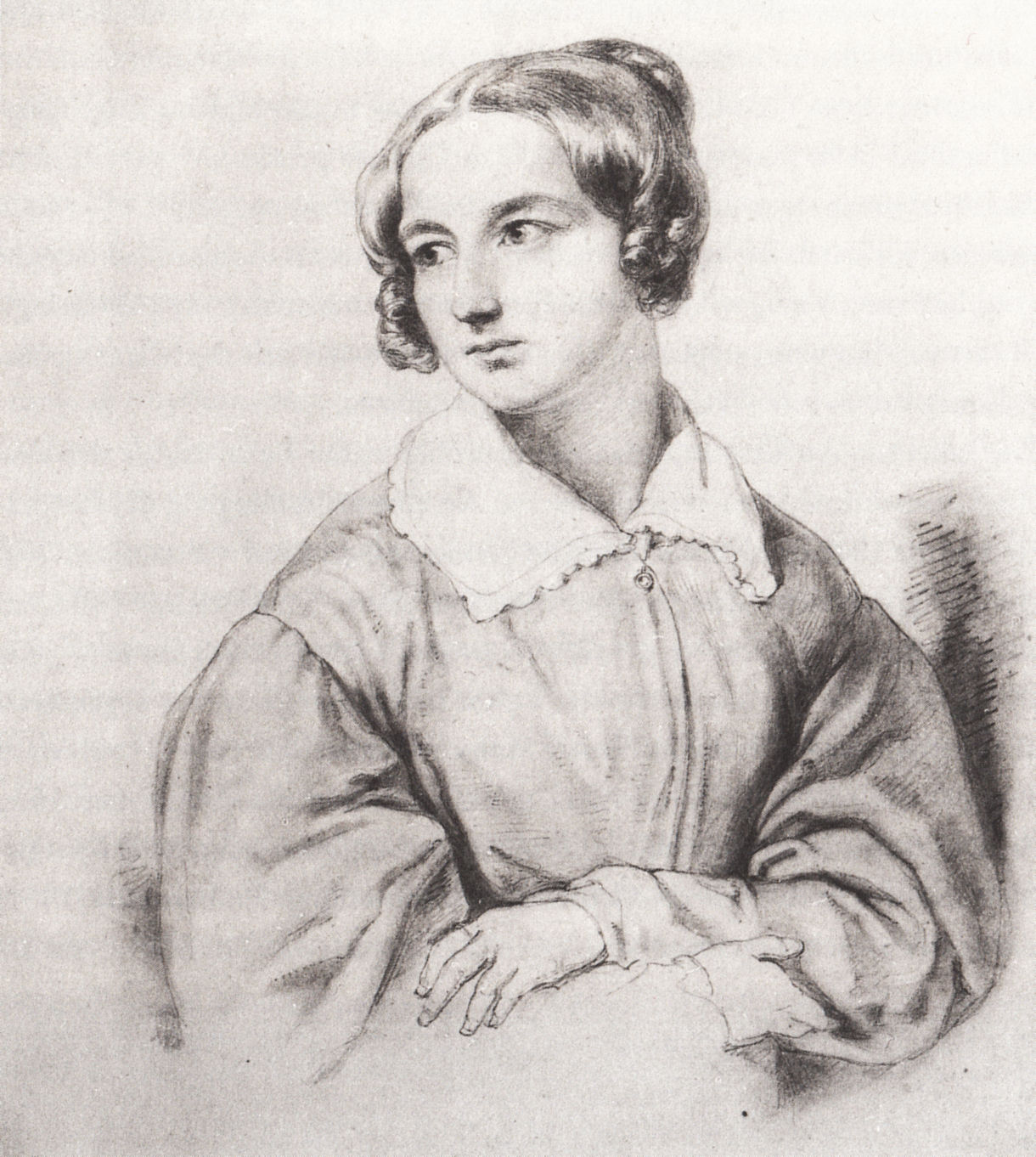
Luise Hensel born 30 March

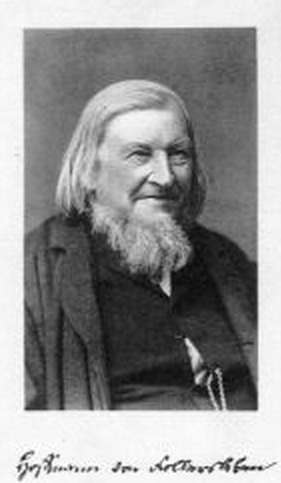
August Heinrich Hoffmann von Fallersleben born 2 April

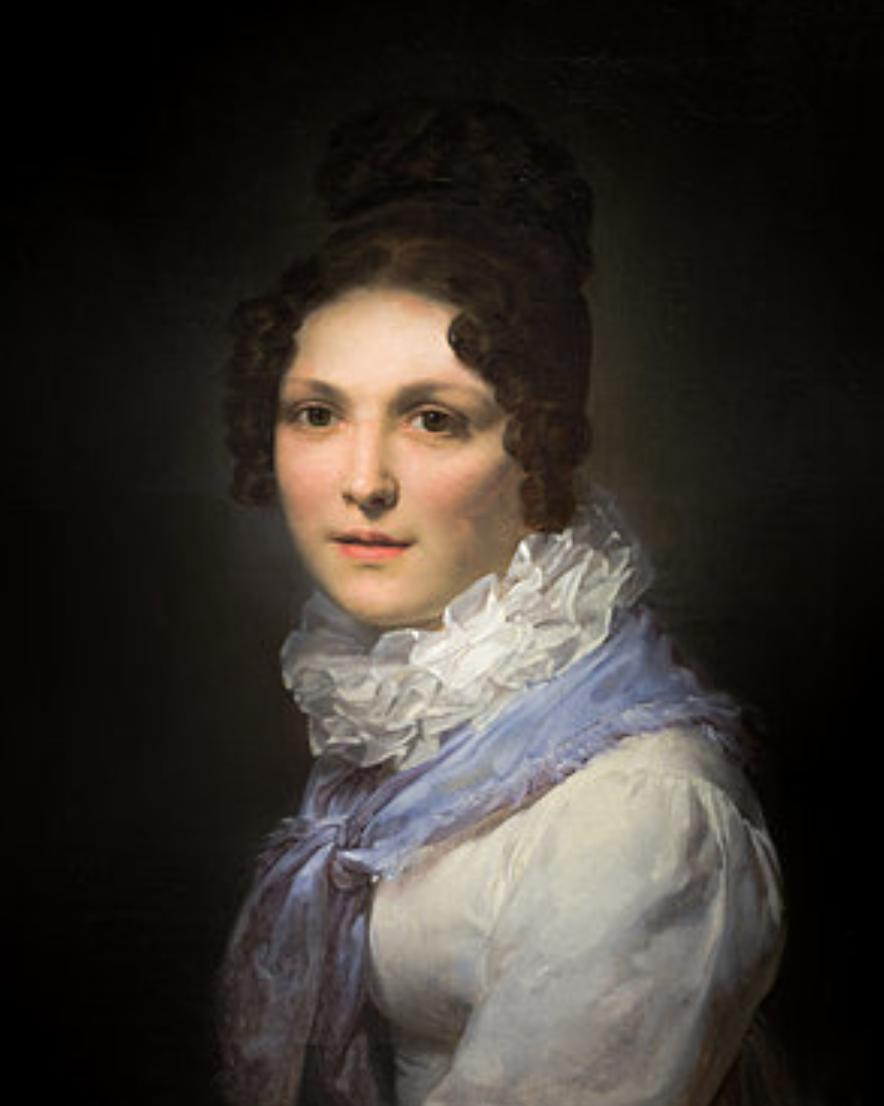
Marie Amélie Cogniet born 5 April

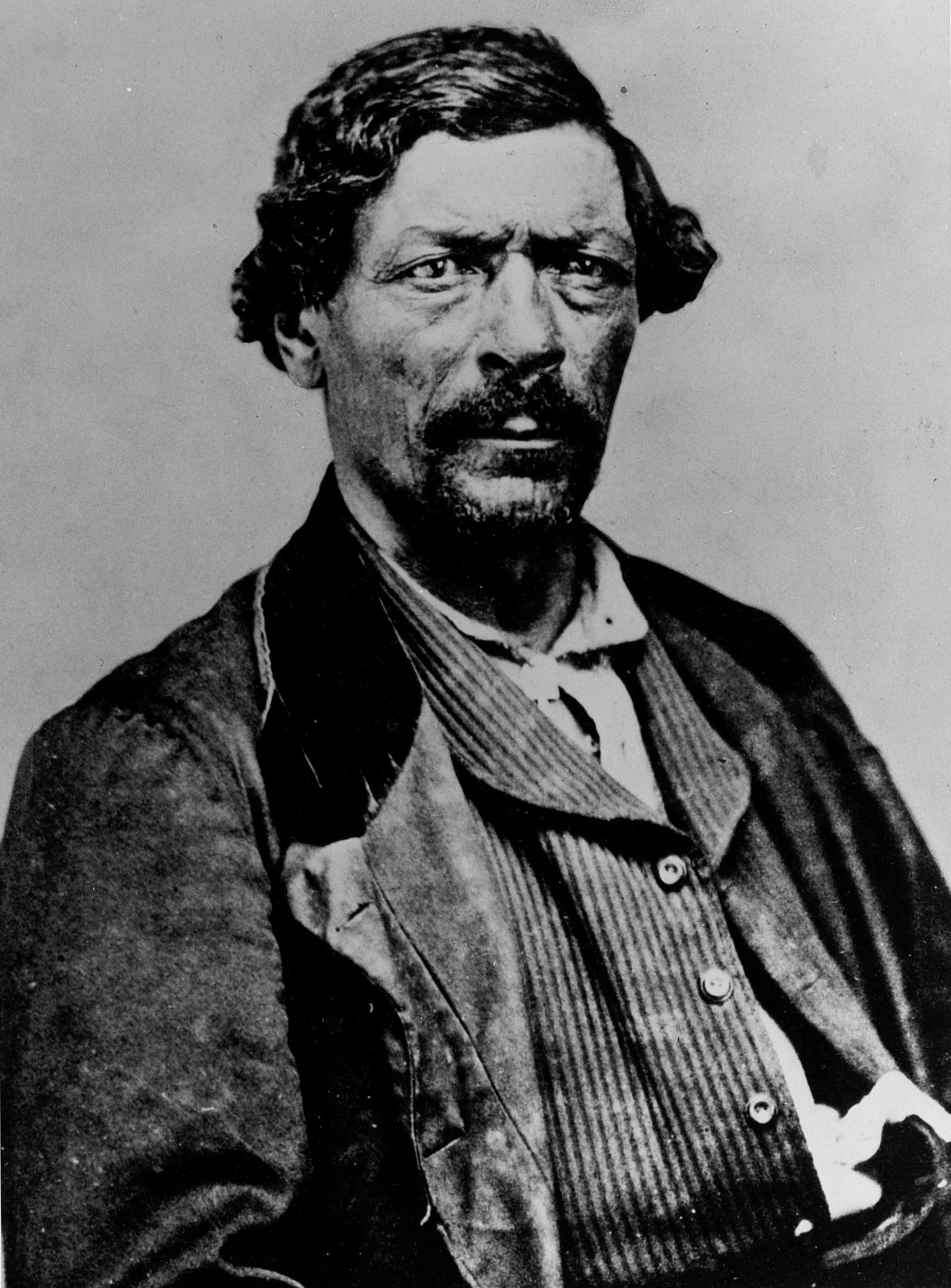
James Beckwourth born 6 April

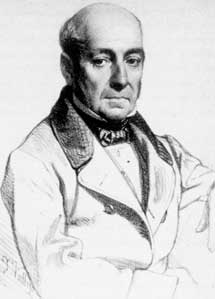
Ramón de la Sagra born 8 April

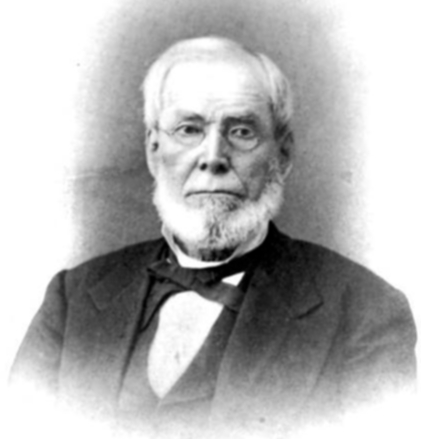
Arphaxed Loomis born 9 April

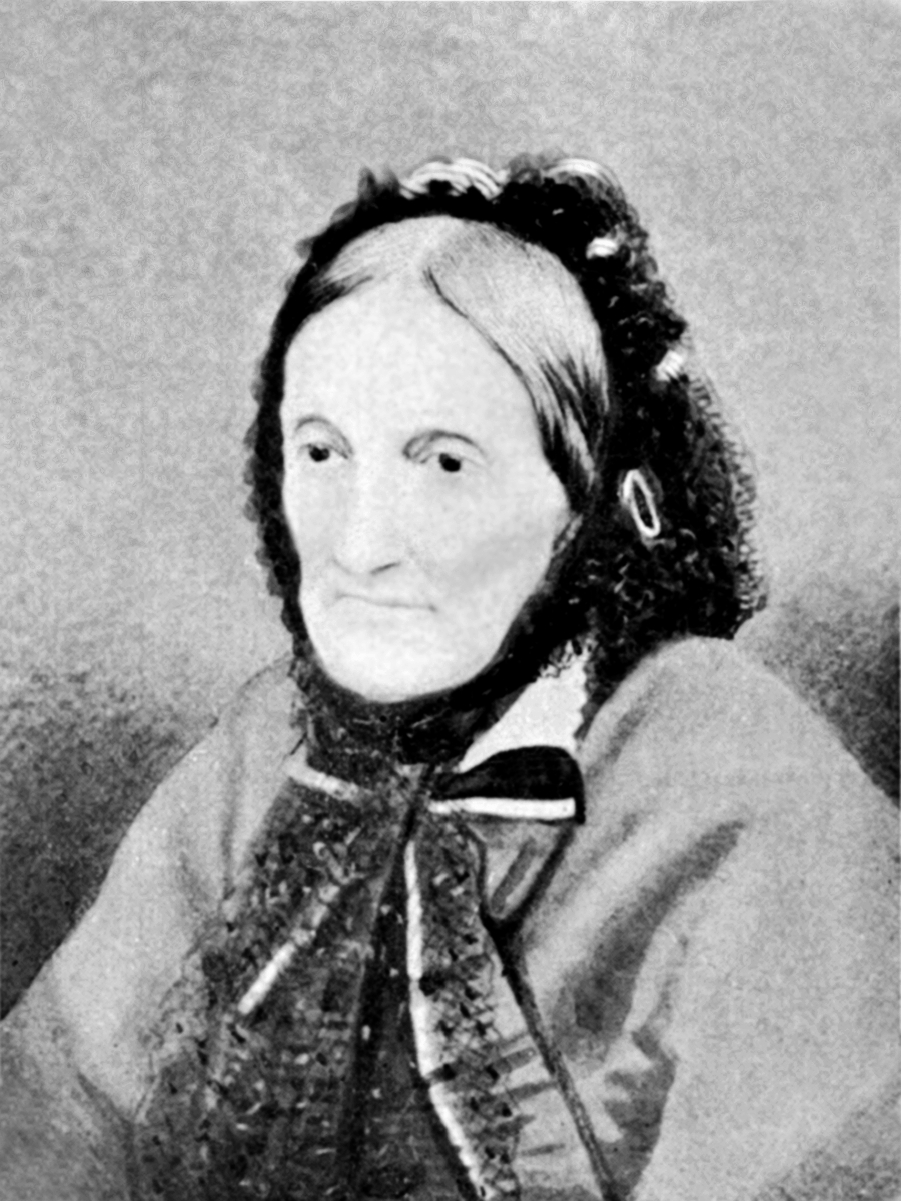
Fanny Gulick born 16 April

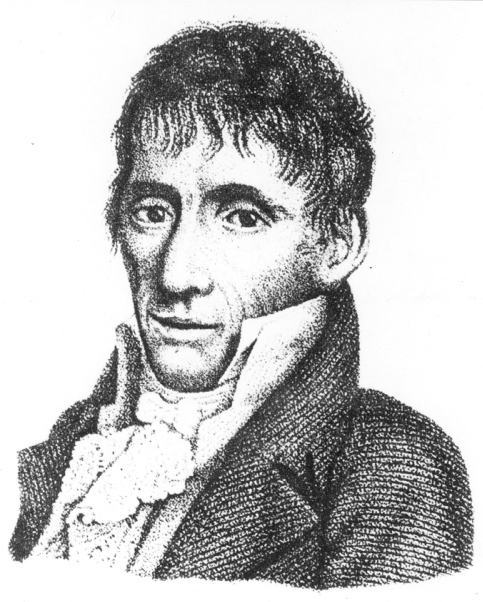
Antonio Rolla born 18 April

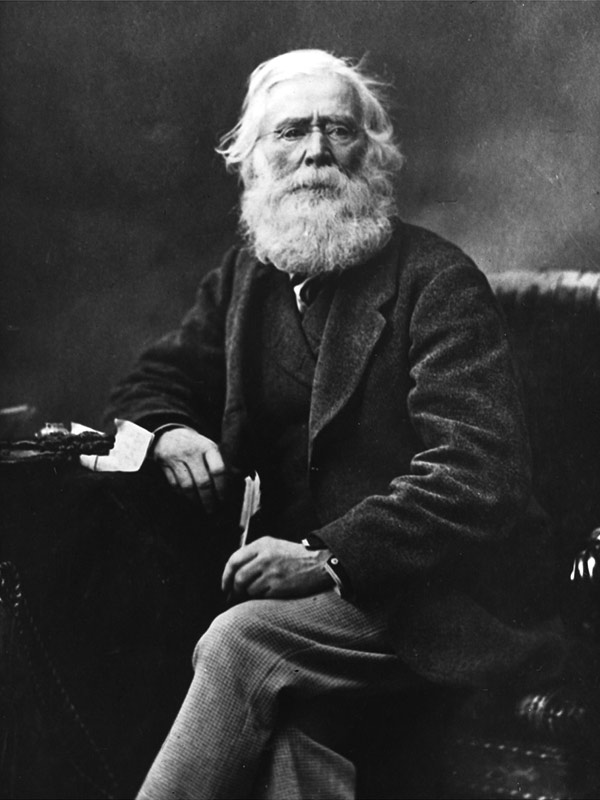
William Edmond Logan born 20 April

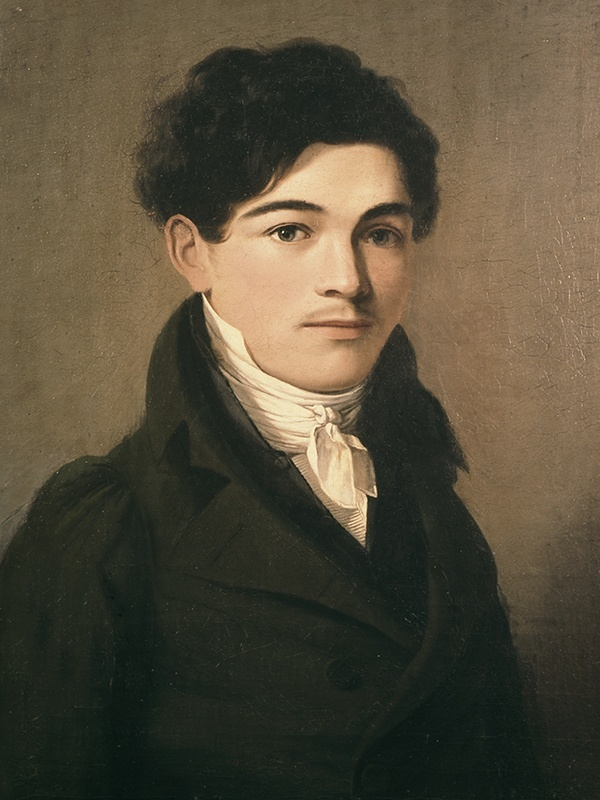
Adolf von Rauch born 22 April

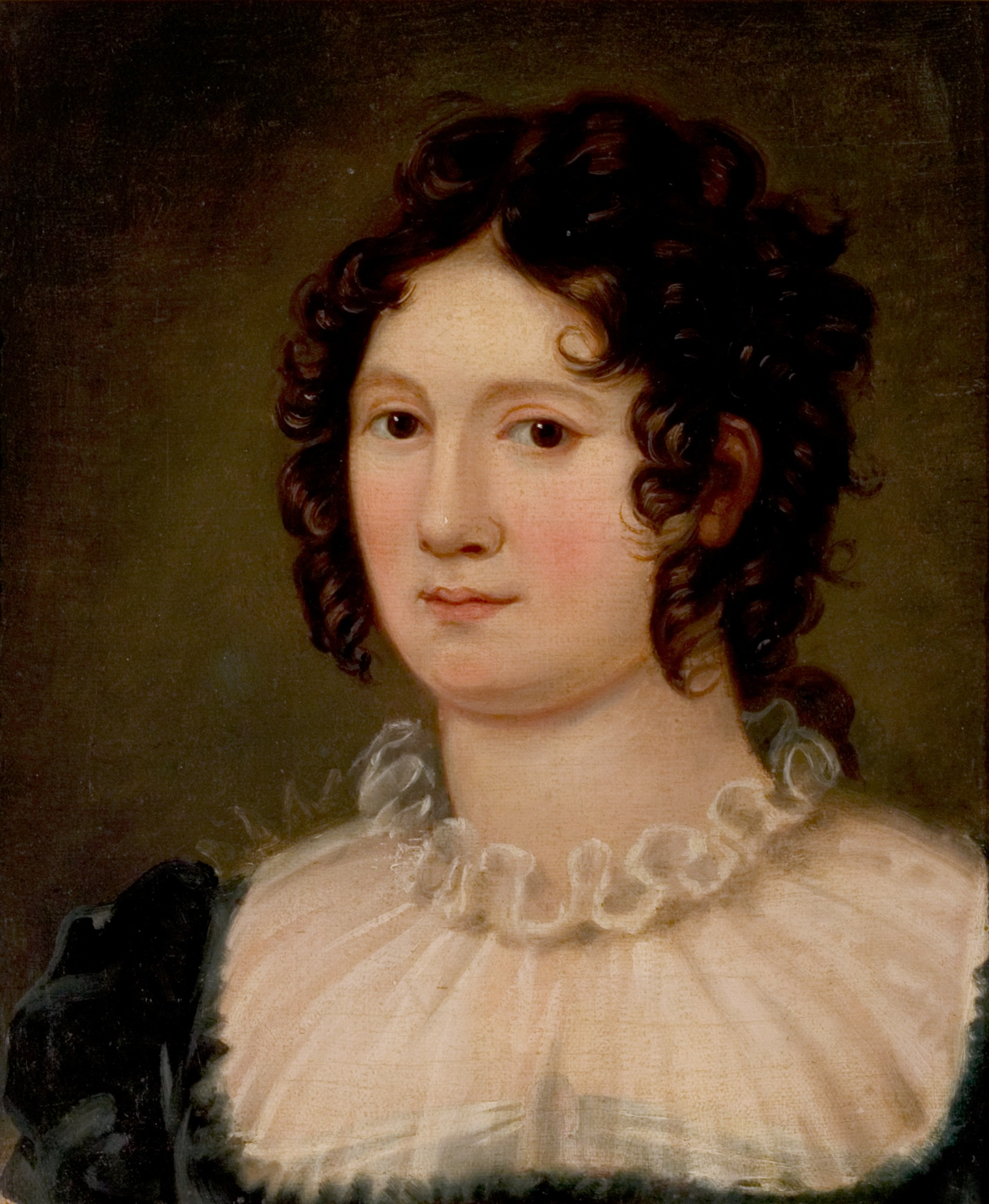
Claire Clairmont born 27 April

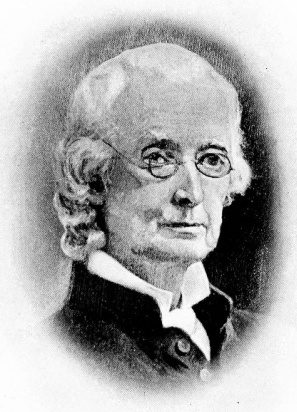
William Mercer Green born 2 May

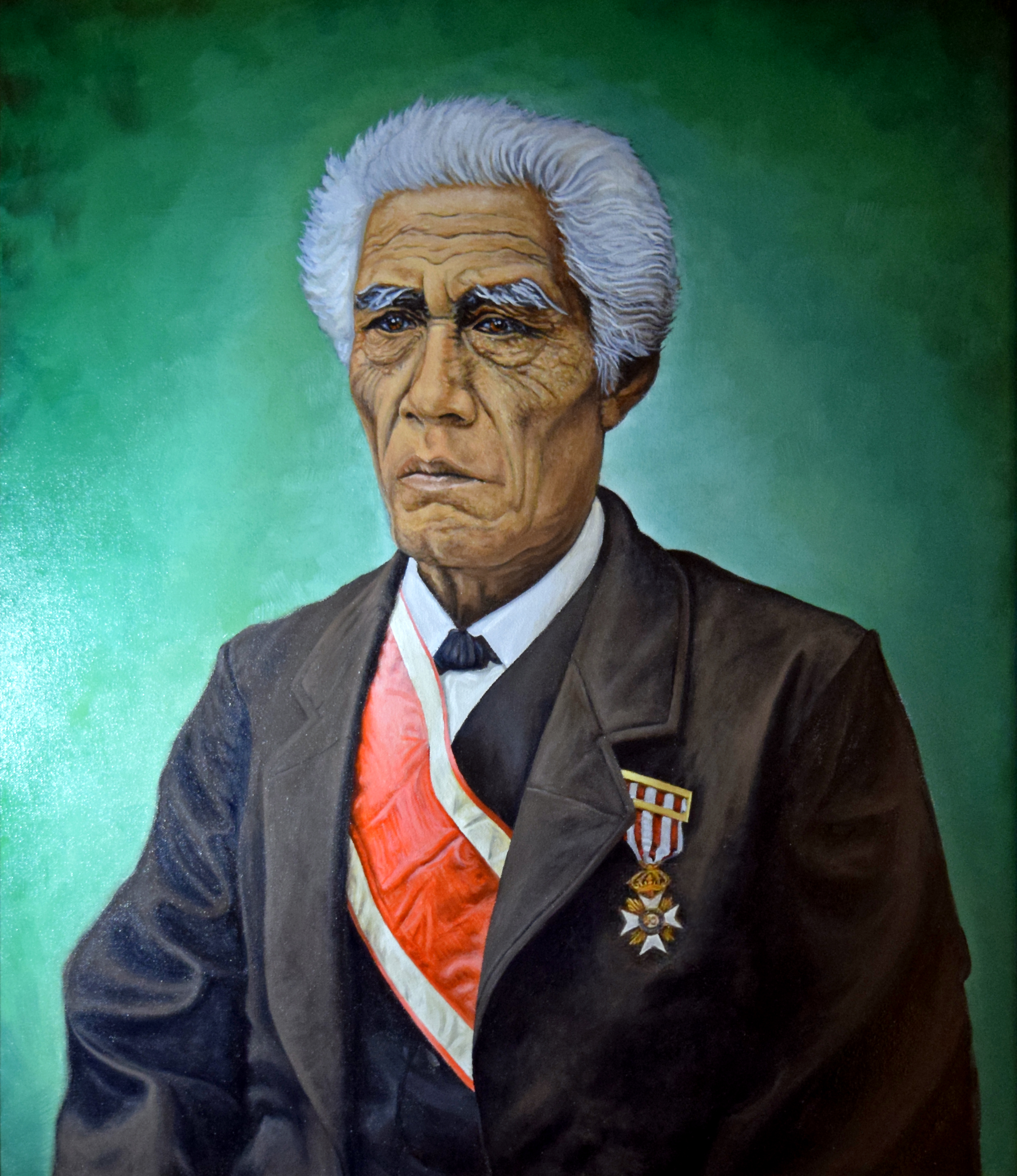
Charles Kanaʻina born 4 May

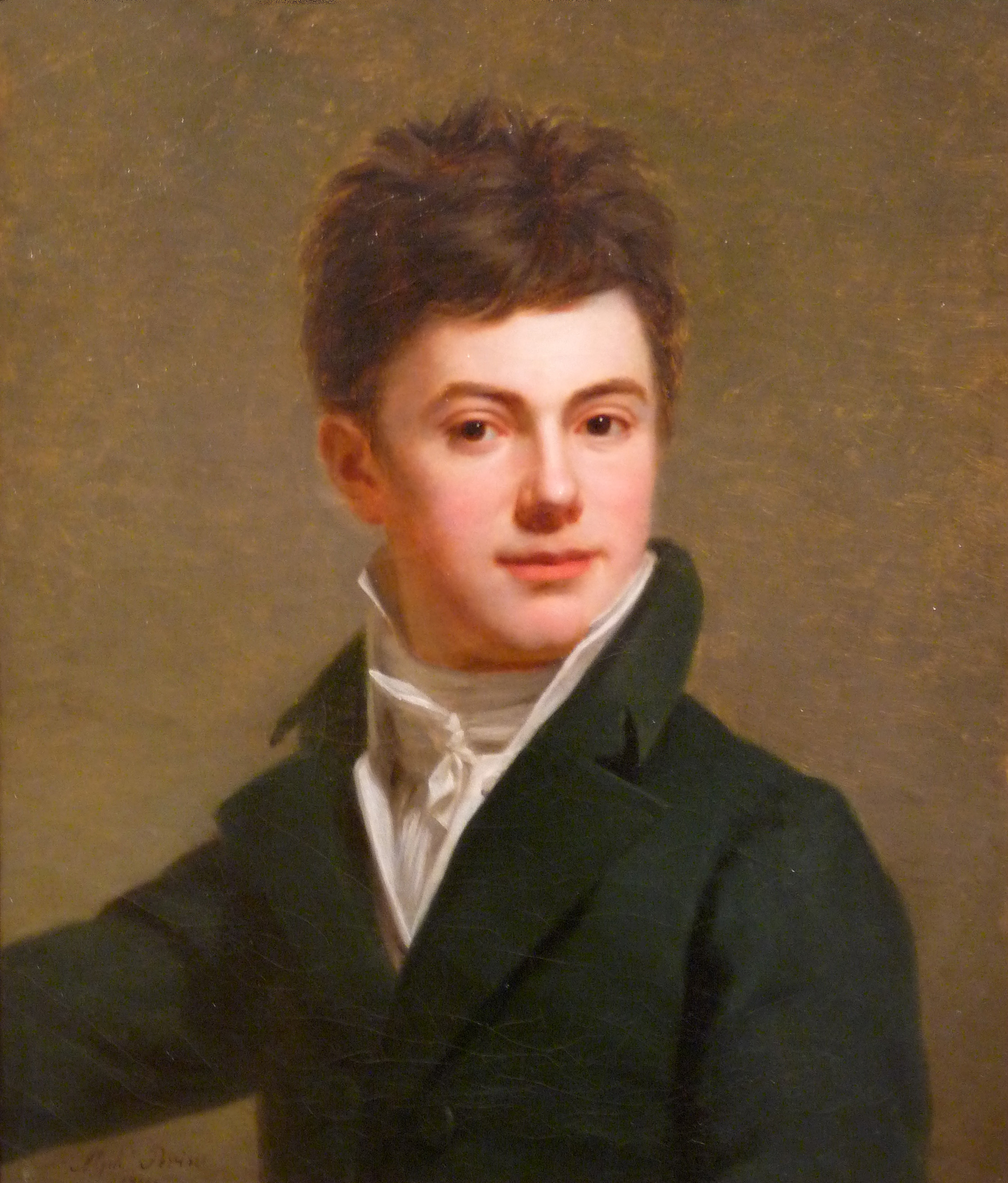
Alphonse Périn born 12 May

Ellis Lewis born 16 May

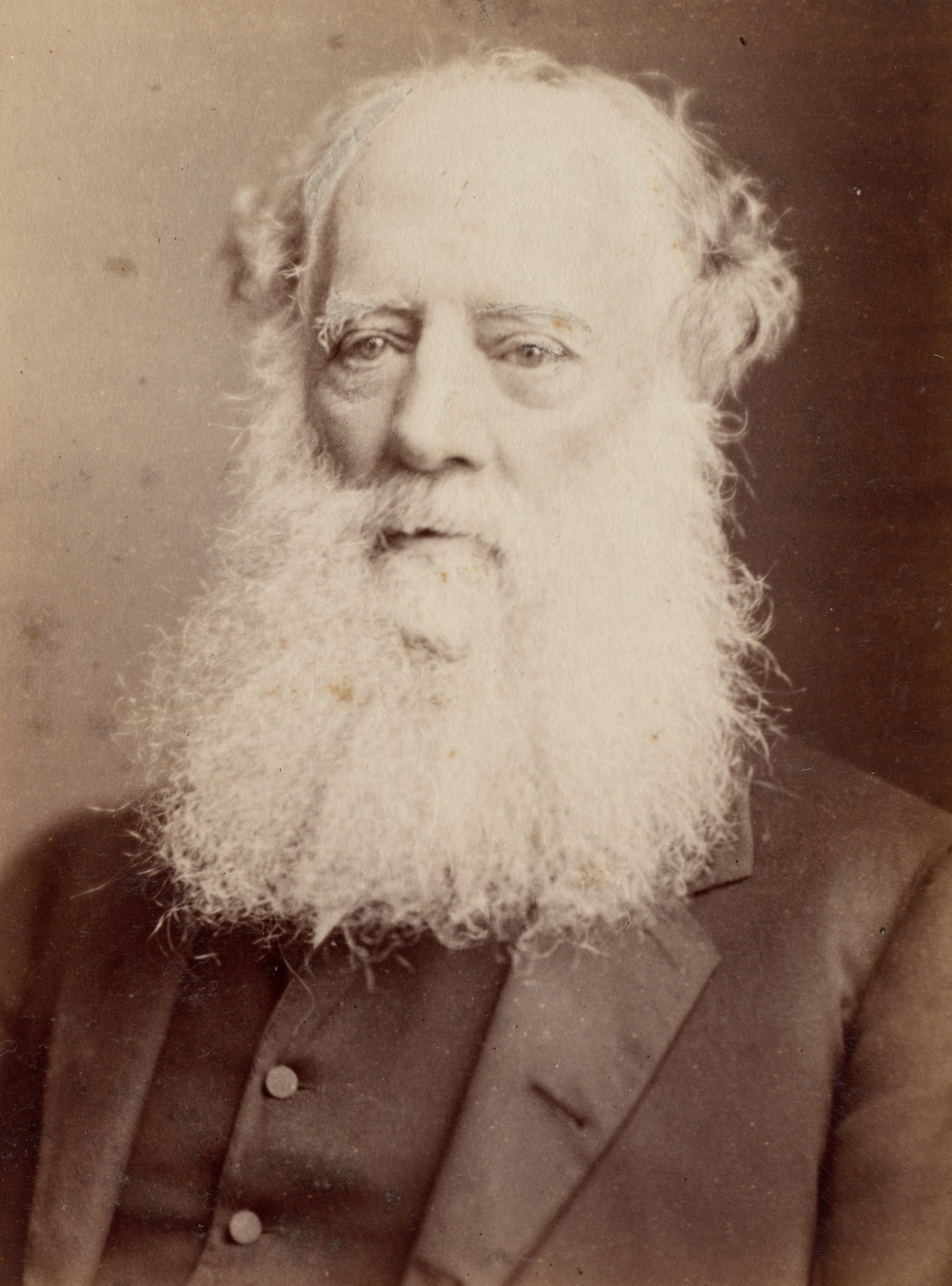
William Branwhite Clarke born 2 June

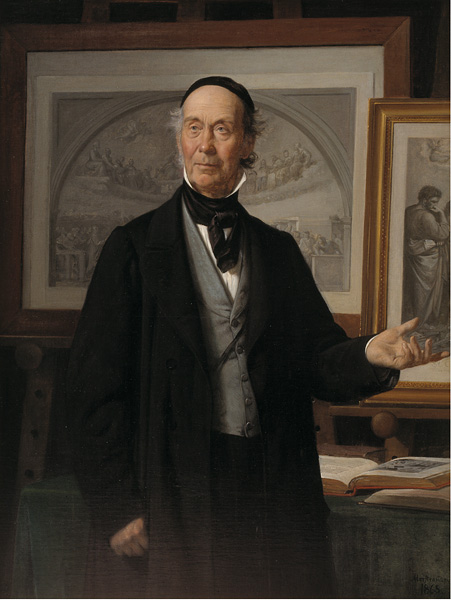
Niels Laurits Høyen born 4 June

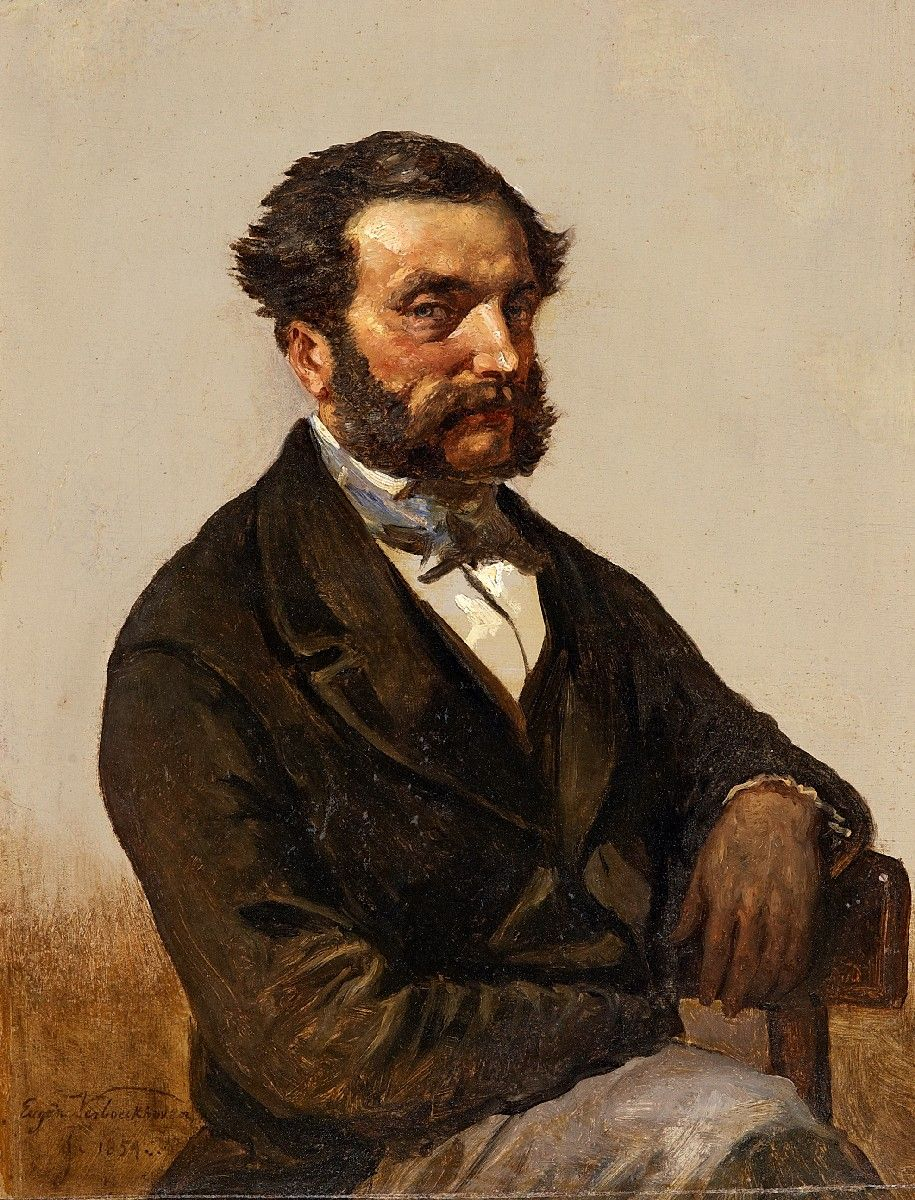
Eugène Joseph Verboeckhoven born 9 June

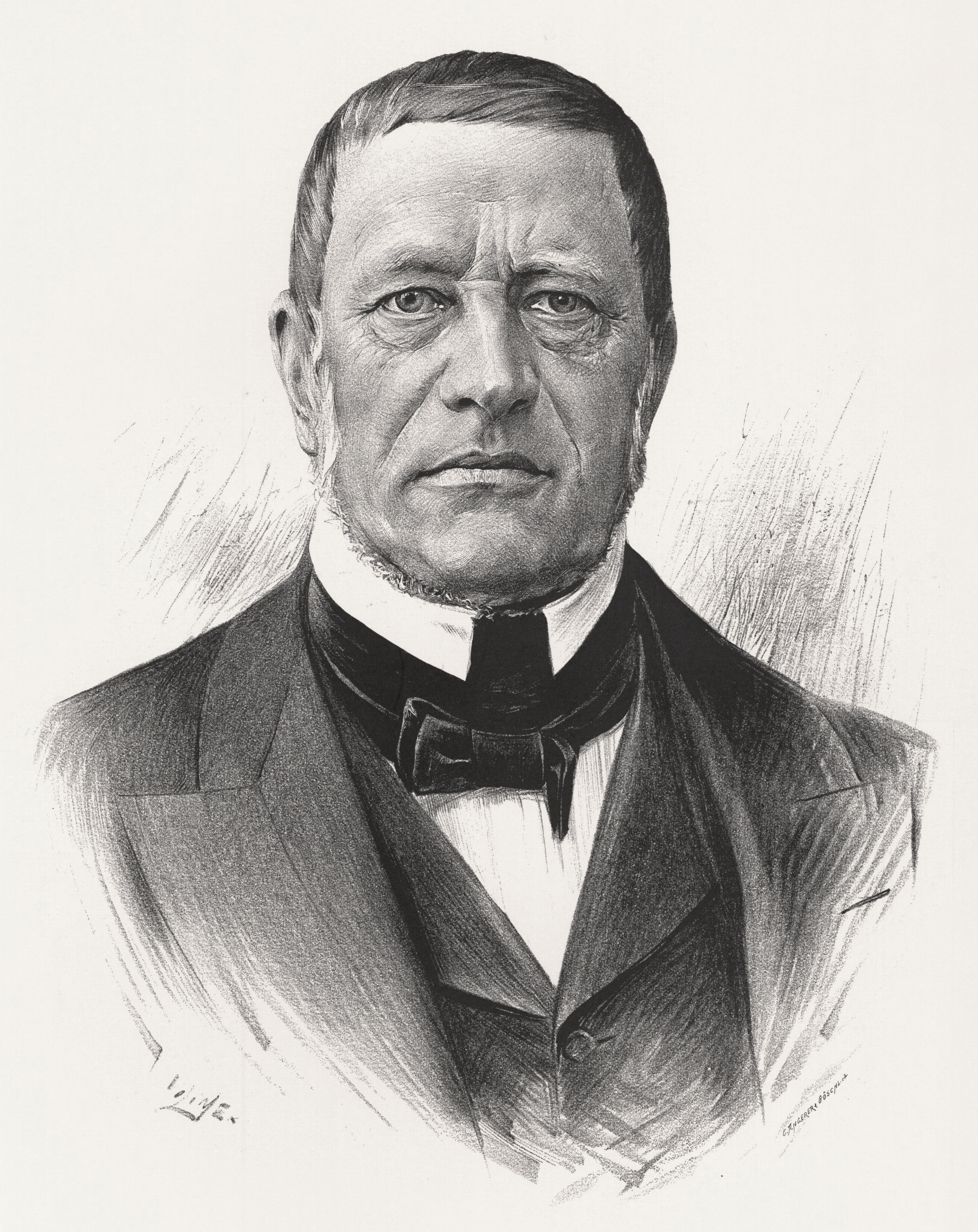
František Palacký born 14 June

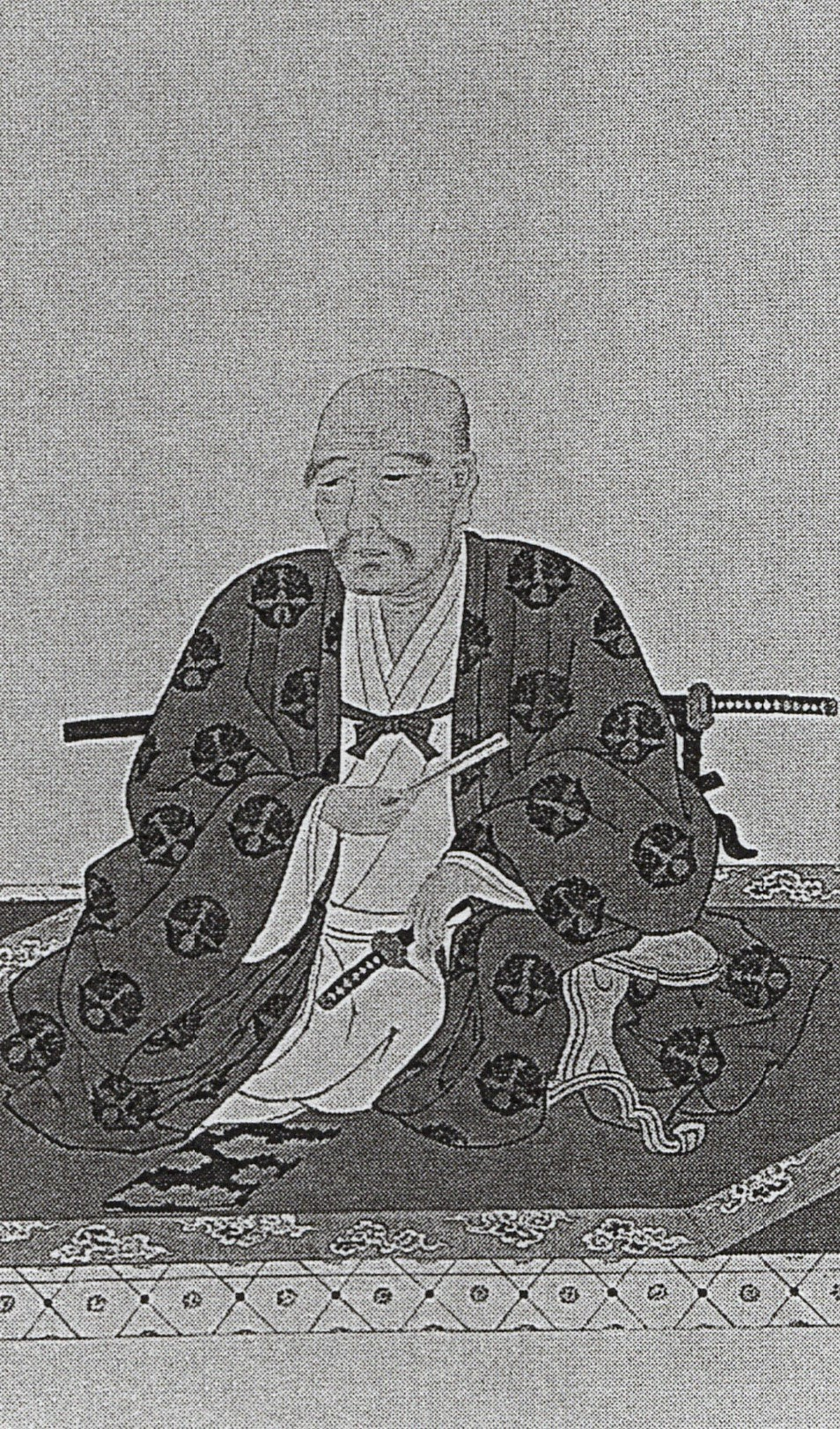
Nabeshima Naotomo born 16 June

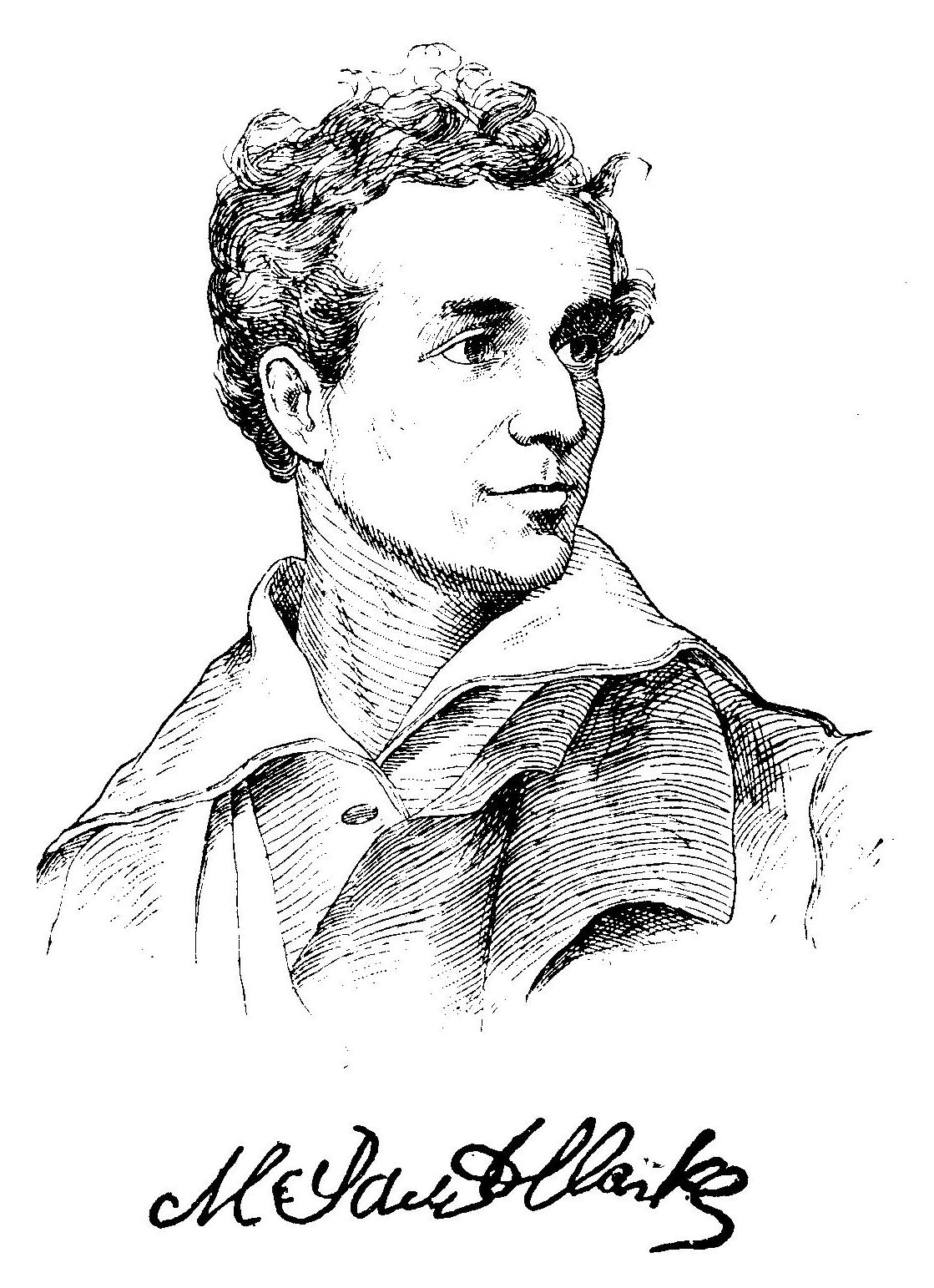
McDonald Clarke born 18 June

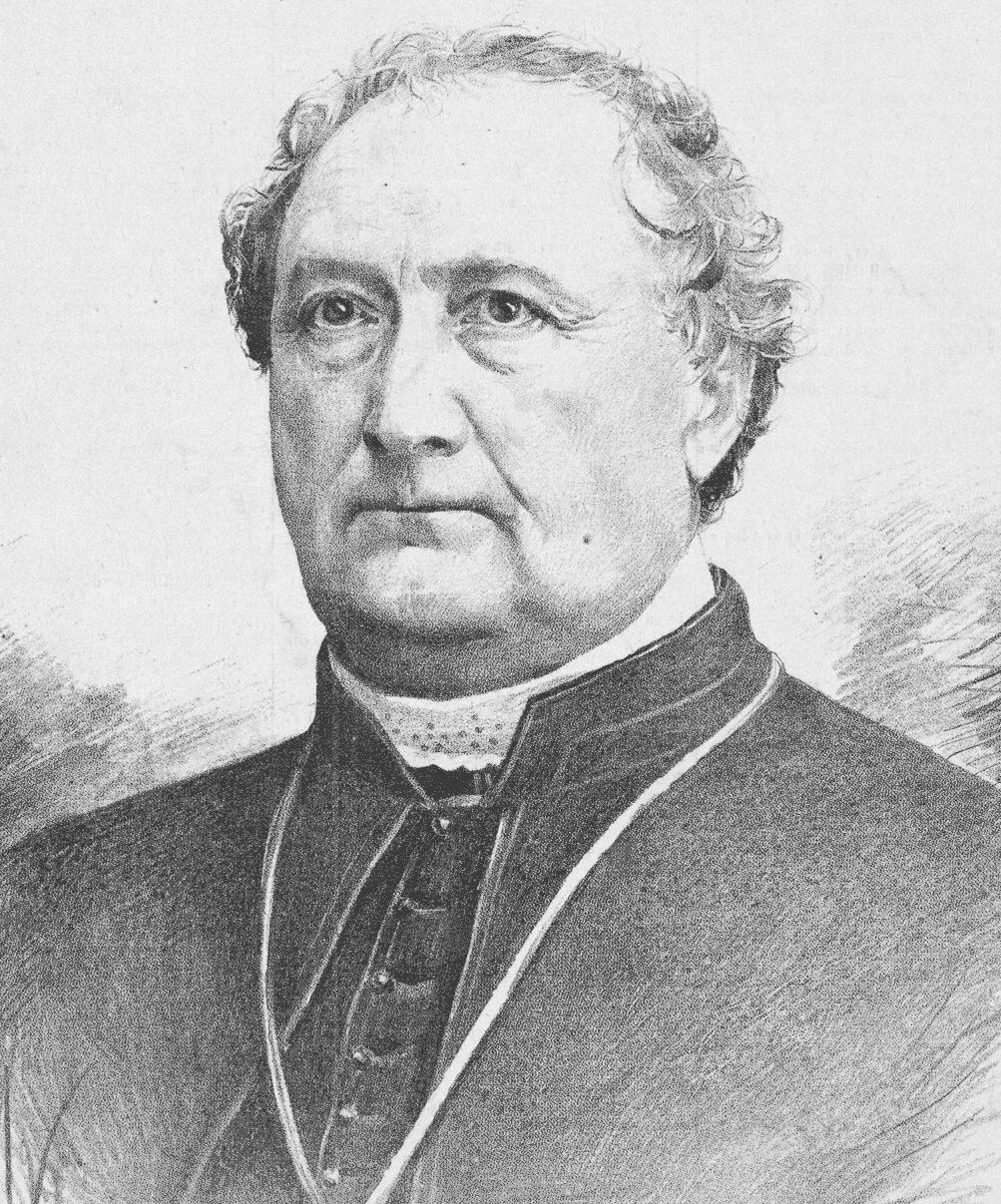
Jan Valerián Jirsík born 19 June

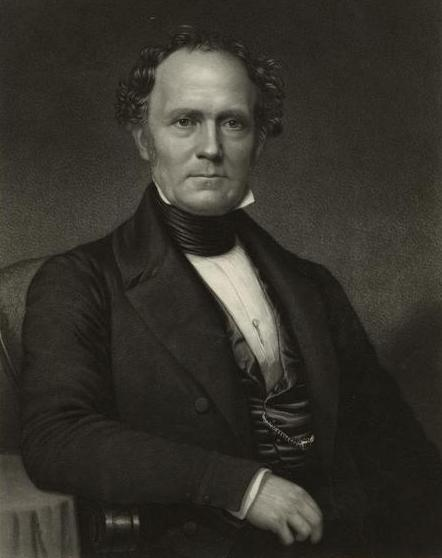
Walter Hilliard Bidwell born 21 June

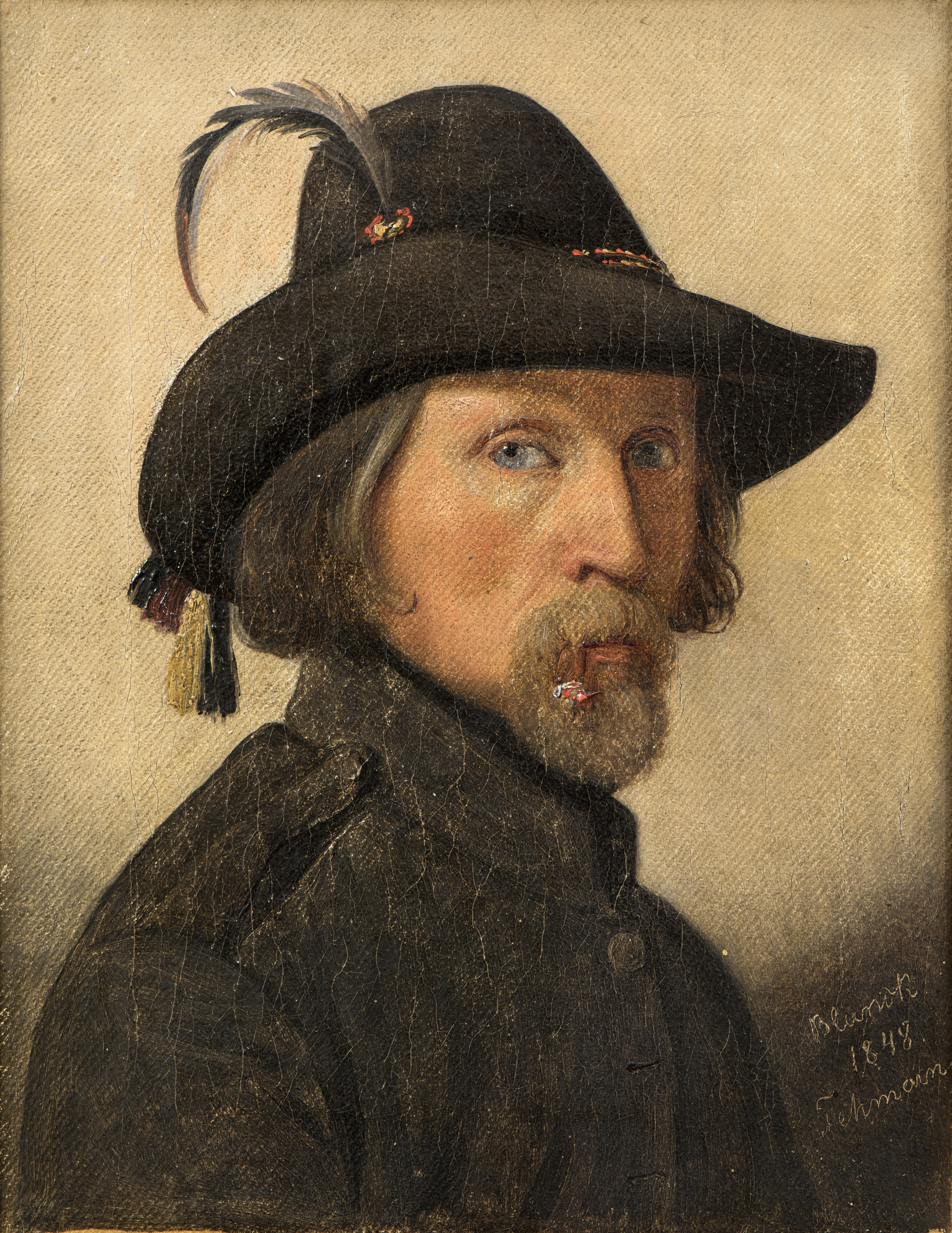
Ditlev Blunck born 22 June

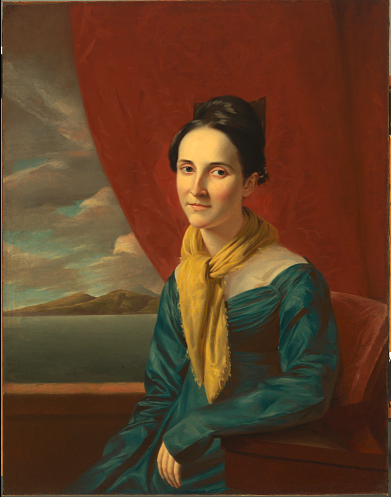
Harriet Bradford Tiffany Stewart born 24 June

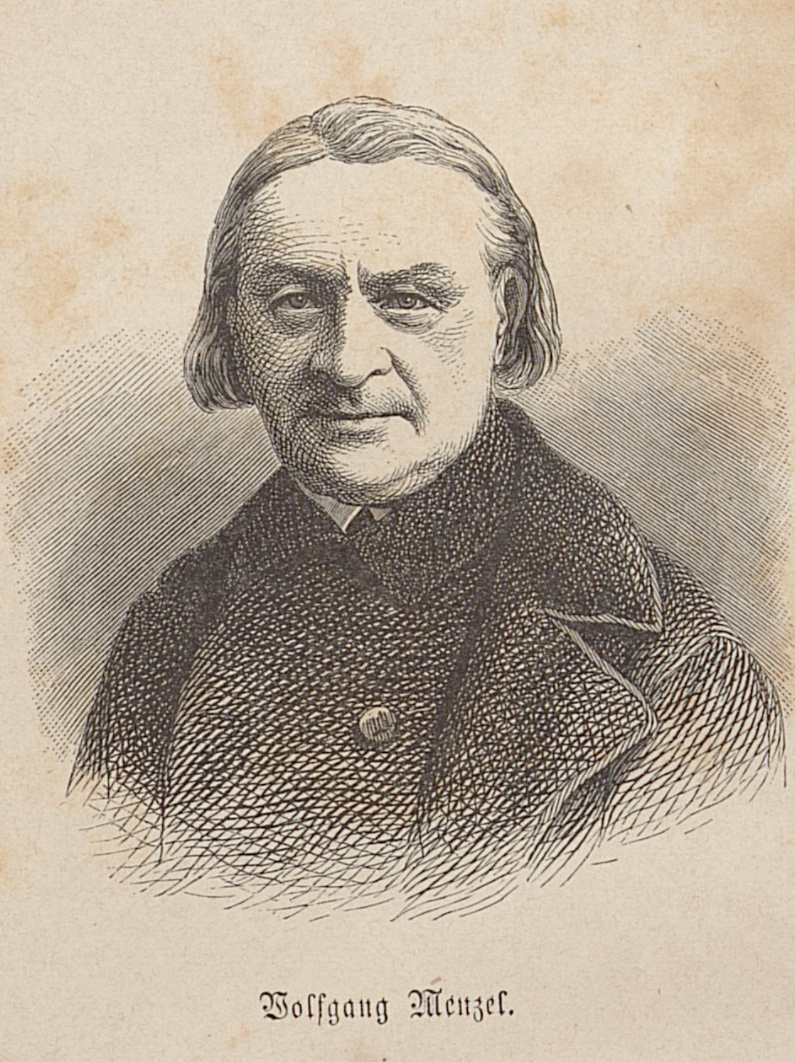
Wolfgang Menzel born 26 June

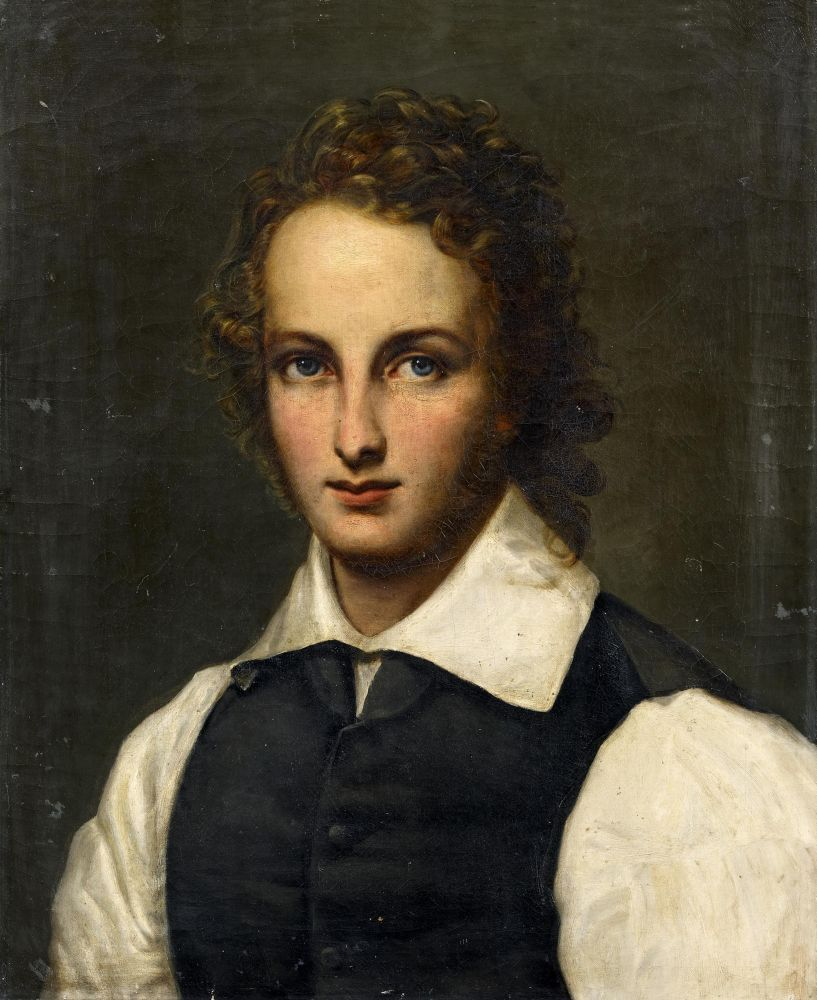
Gustav Adolf Michaelis born 9 July

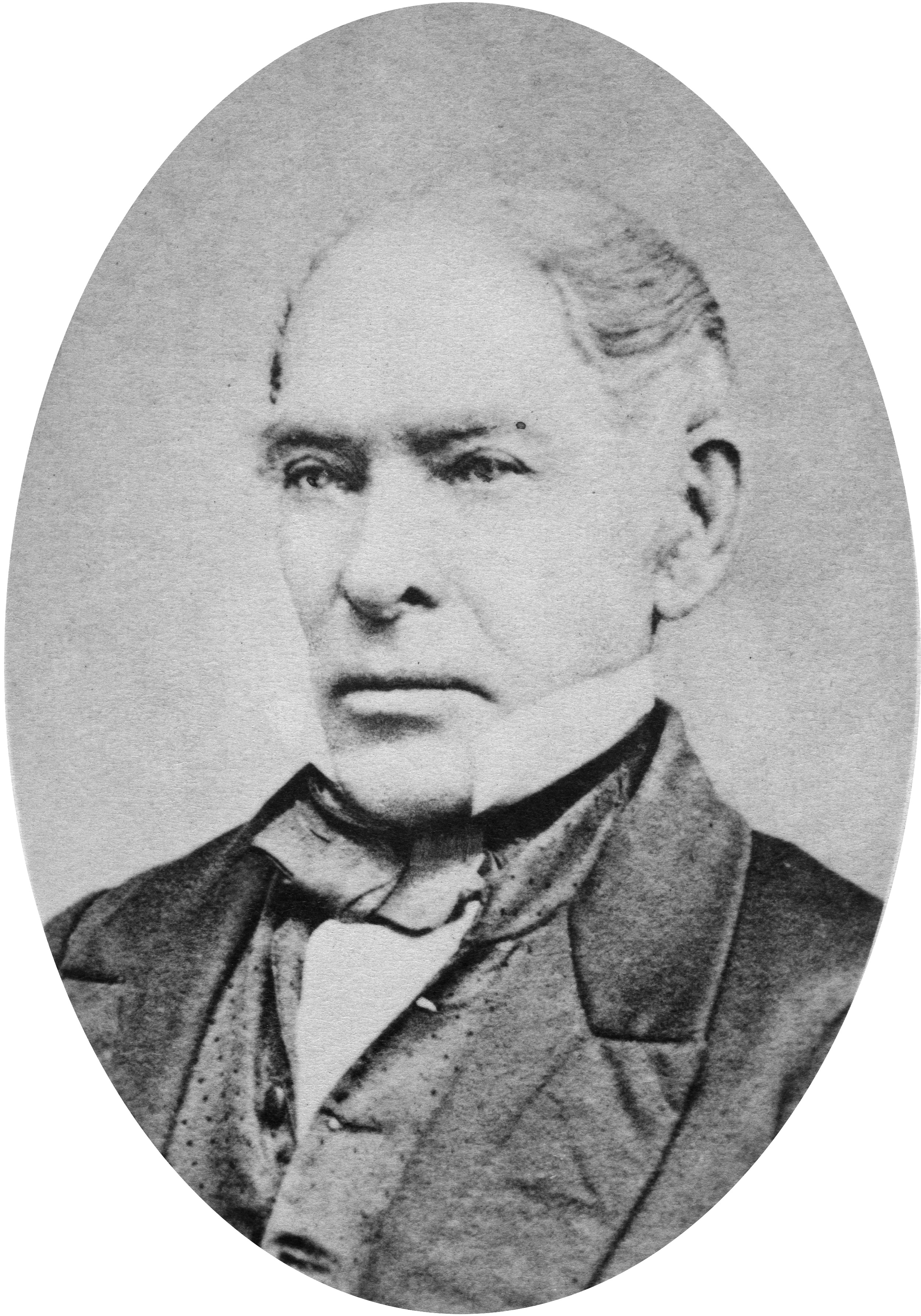
Cyrus Bryant born 12 July

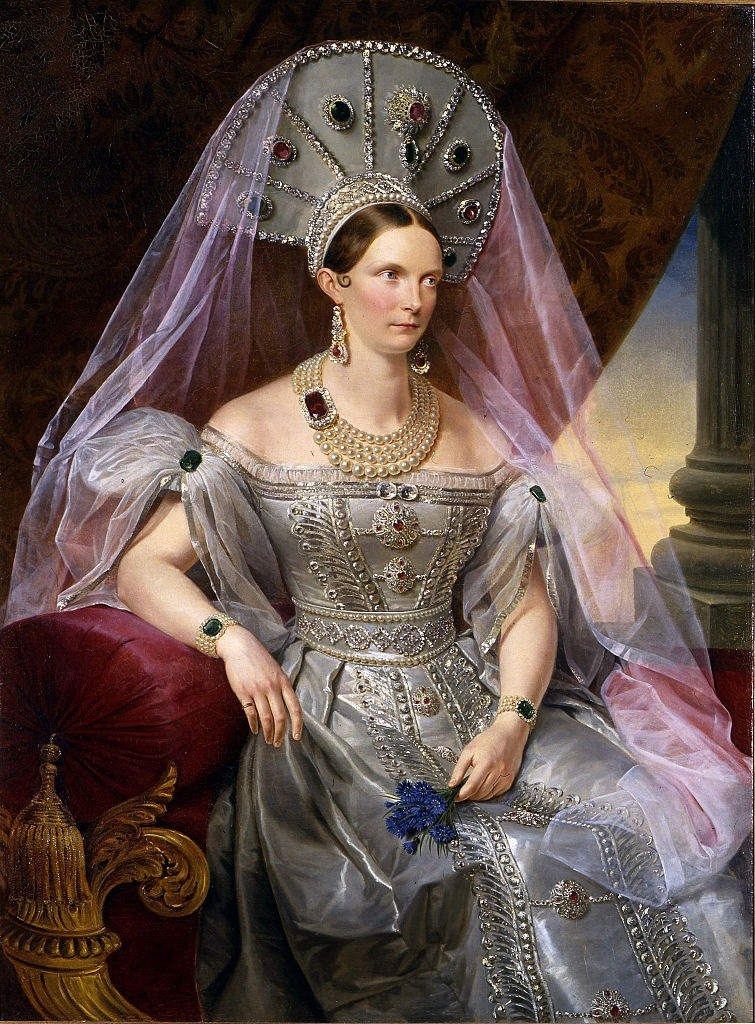
Alexandra Feodorovna (Charlotte of Prussia) born 13 July

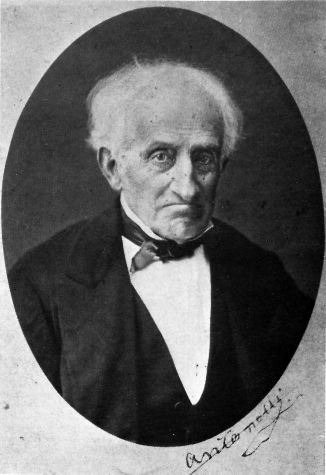
Alessandro Antonelli born 14 July

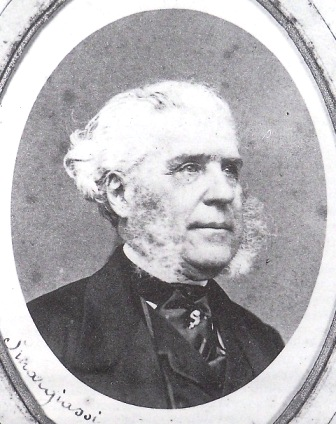
Gabriele Smargiassi born 22 July

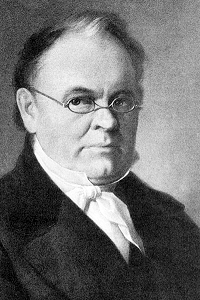
Albert Knapp born 25 July

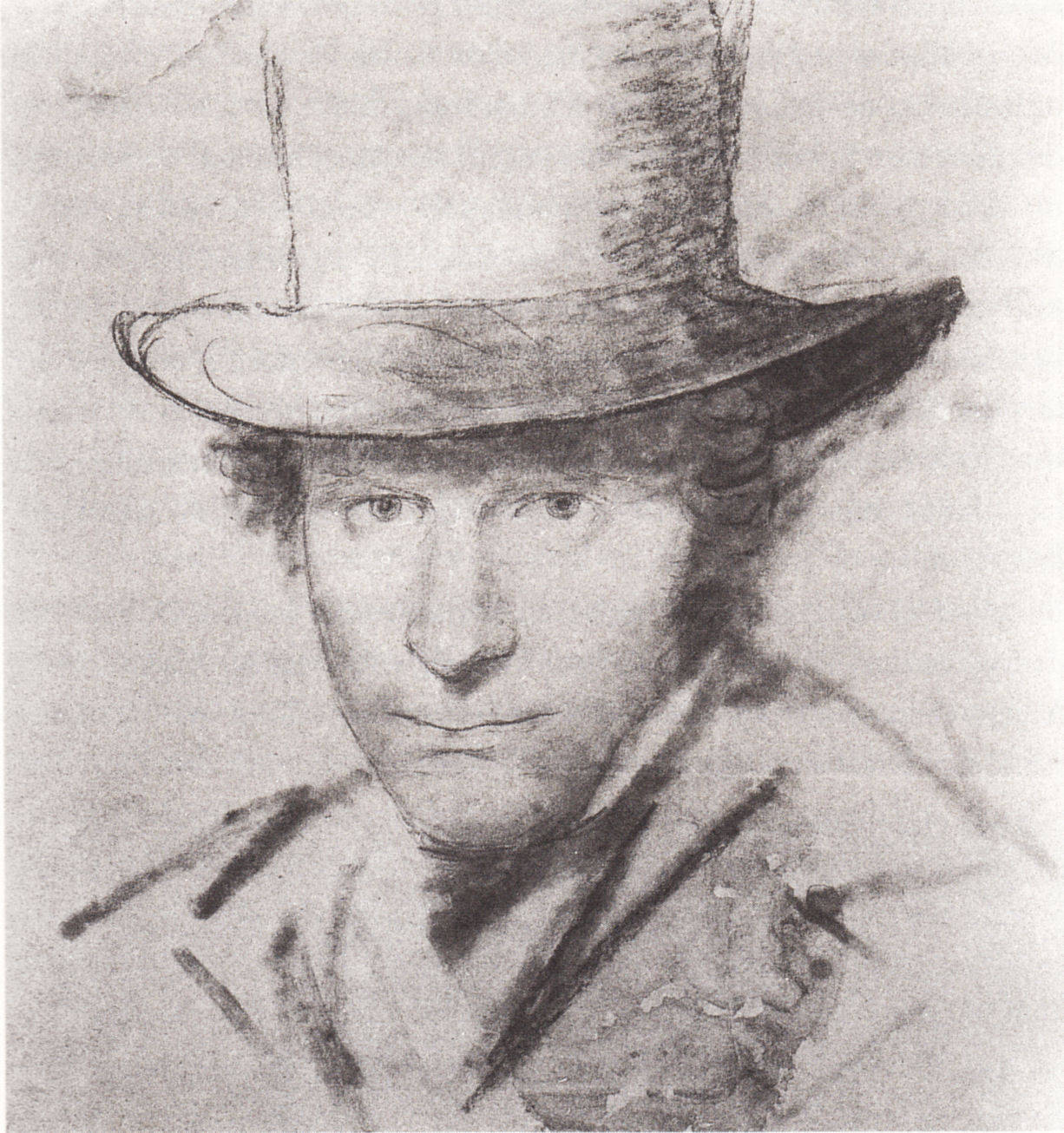
Carl Blechen born 29 July

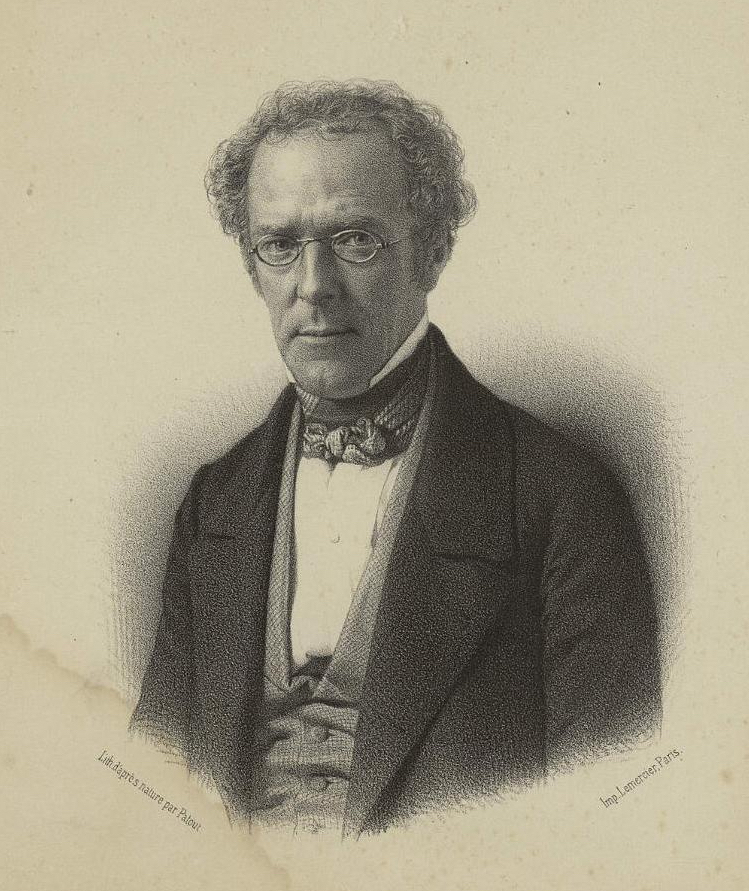
Prosper Duvergier de Hauranne born 3 August

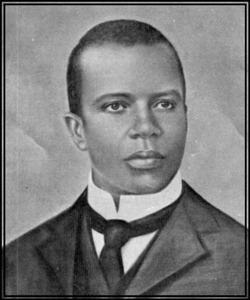
Walker Lewis born 3 August

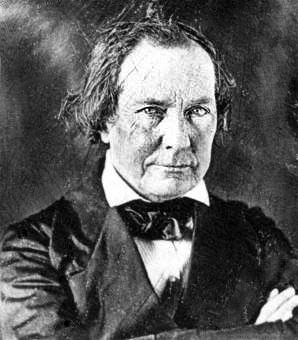
Mirabeau B. Lamar born 16 August

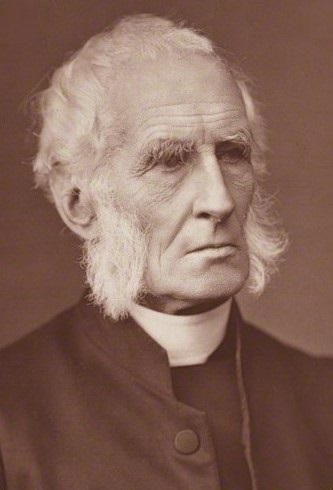
Alfred Ollivant (bishop) born 16 August

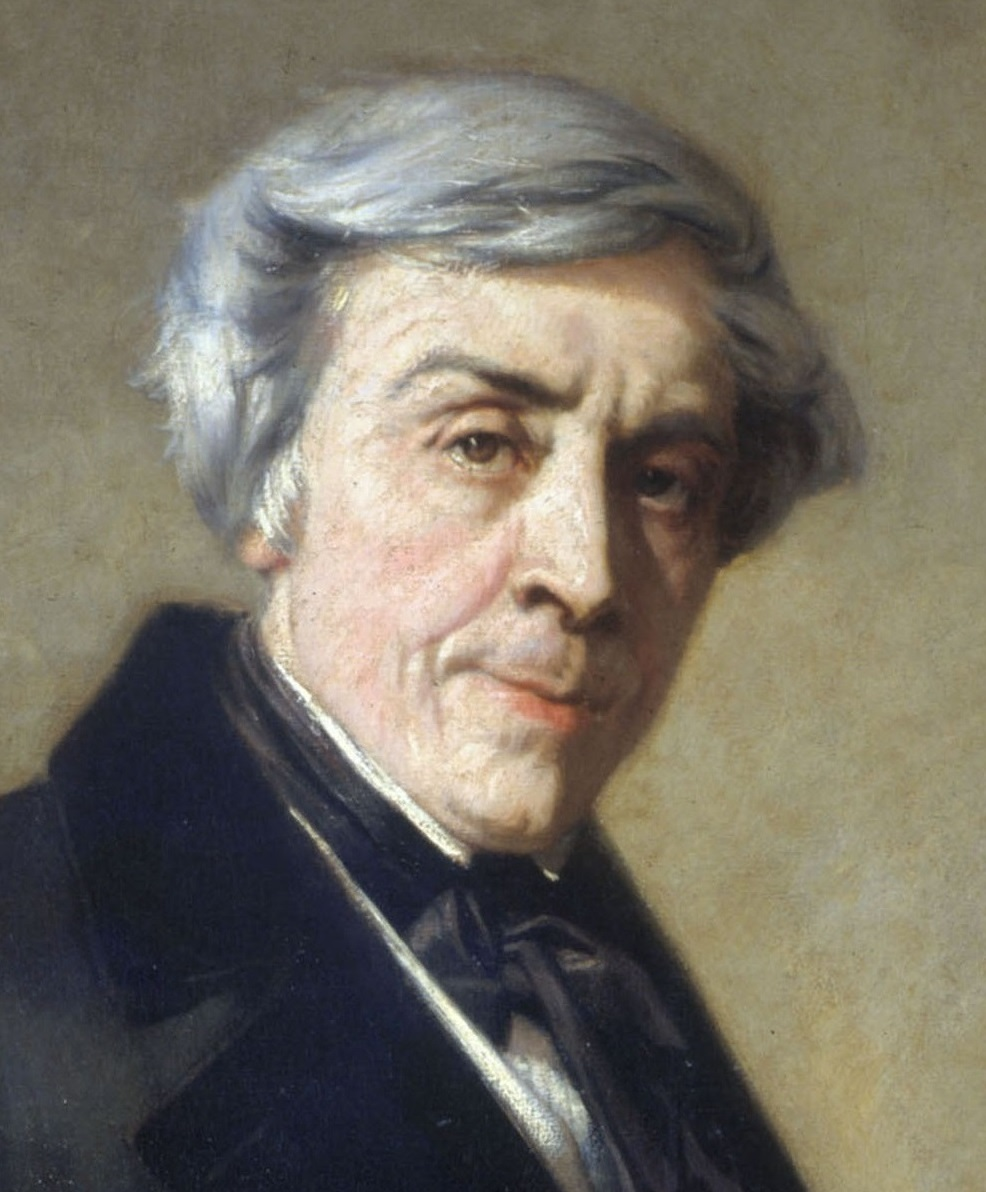
Jules Michelet born 21 August

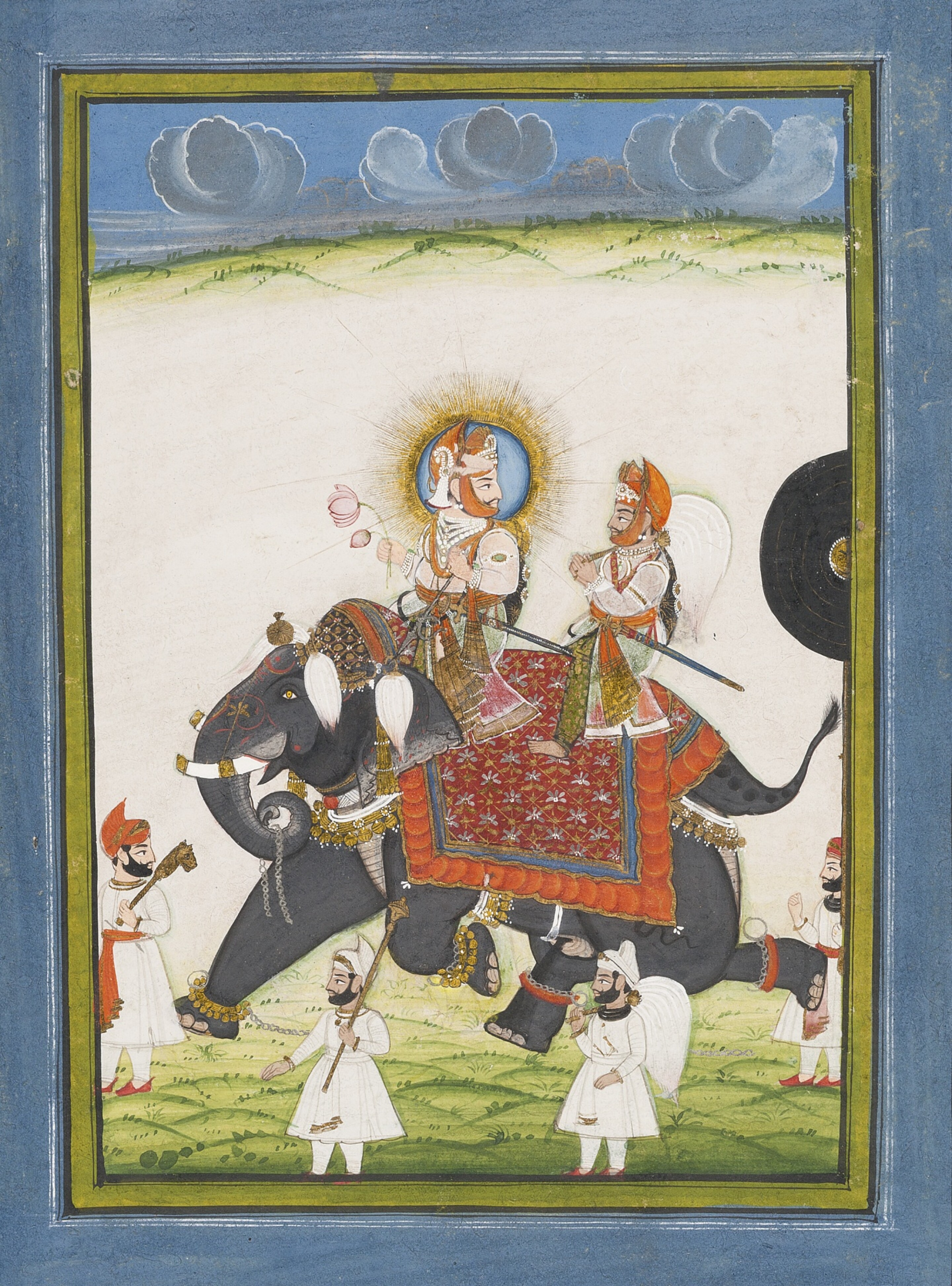
Sardar Singh of Udaipur born 29 August

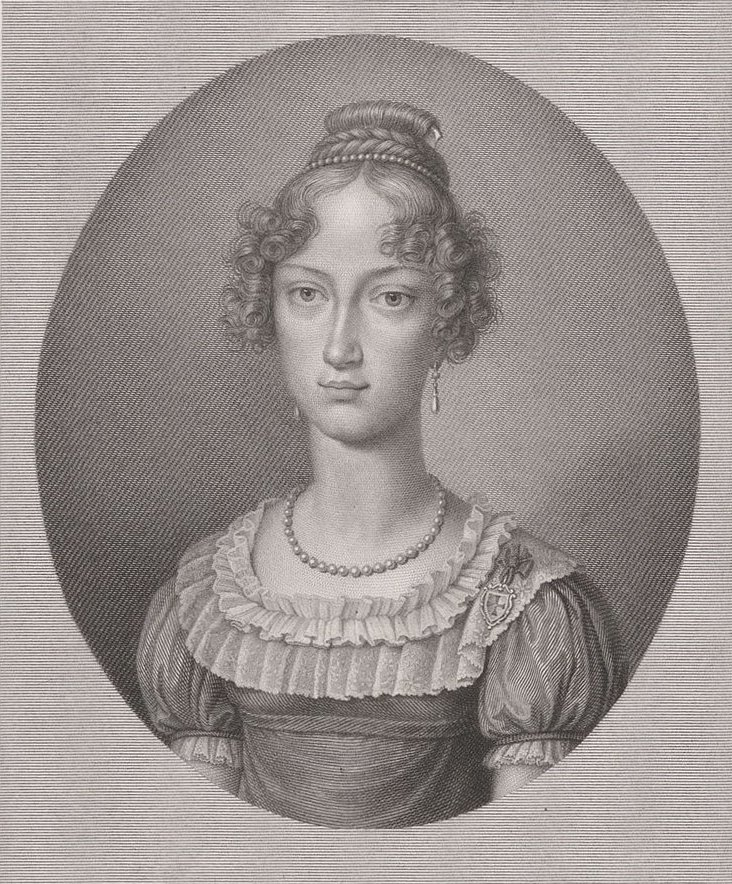
Archduchess Maria Luisa of Austria born 30 August

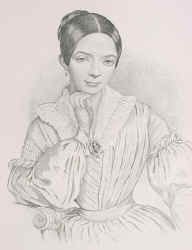
Virginie Déjazet born 30 August

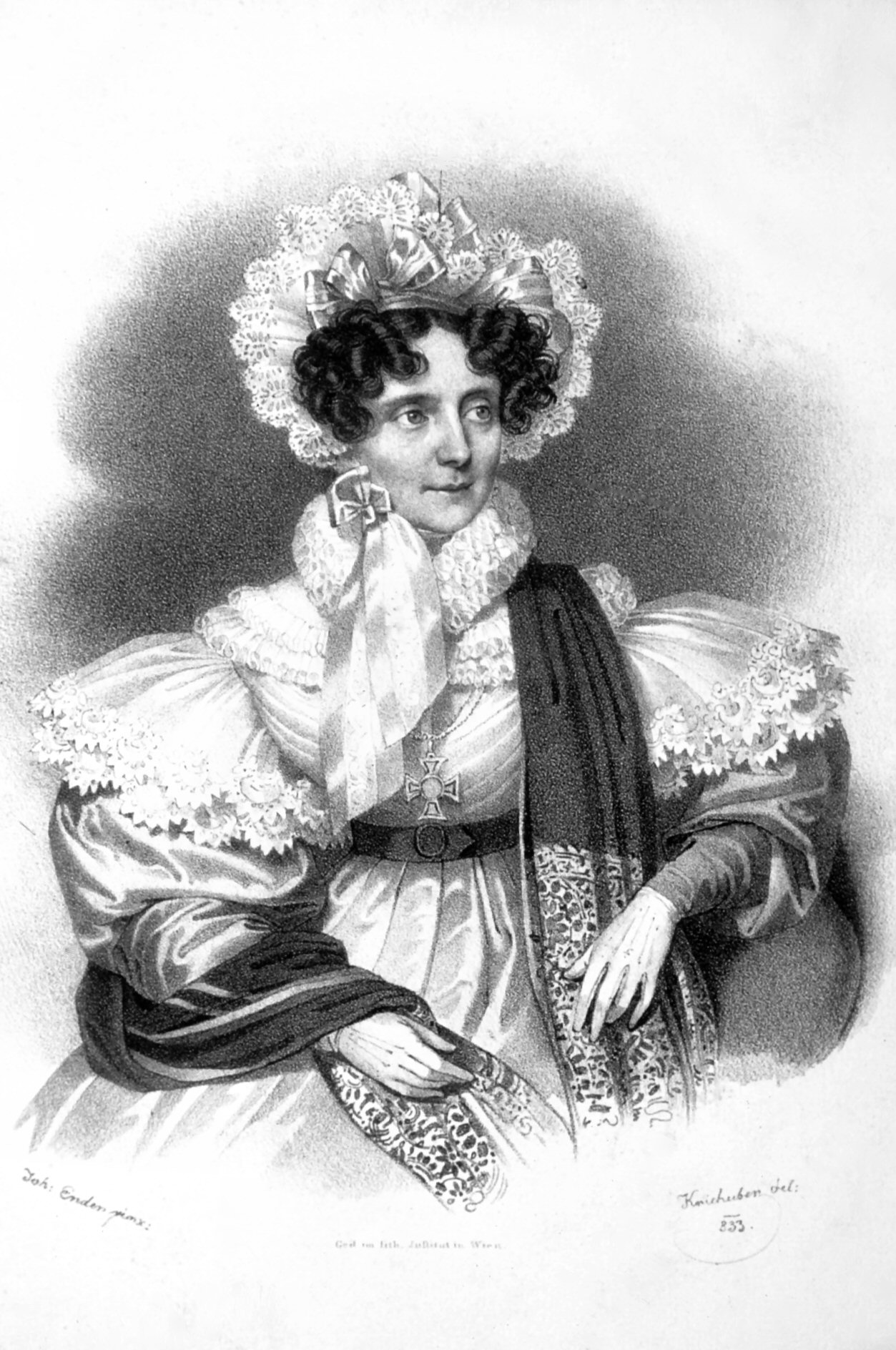
Sophie Esterházy born 5 September

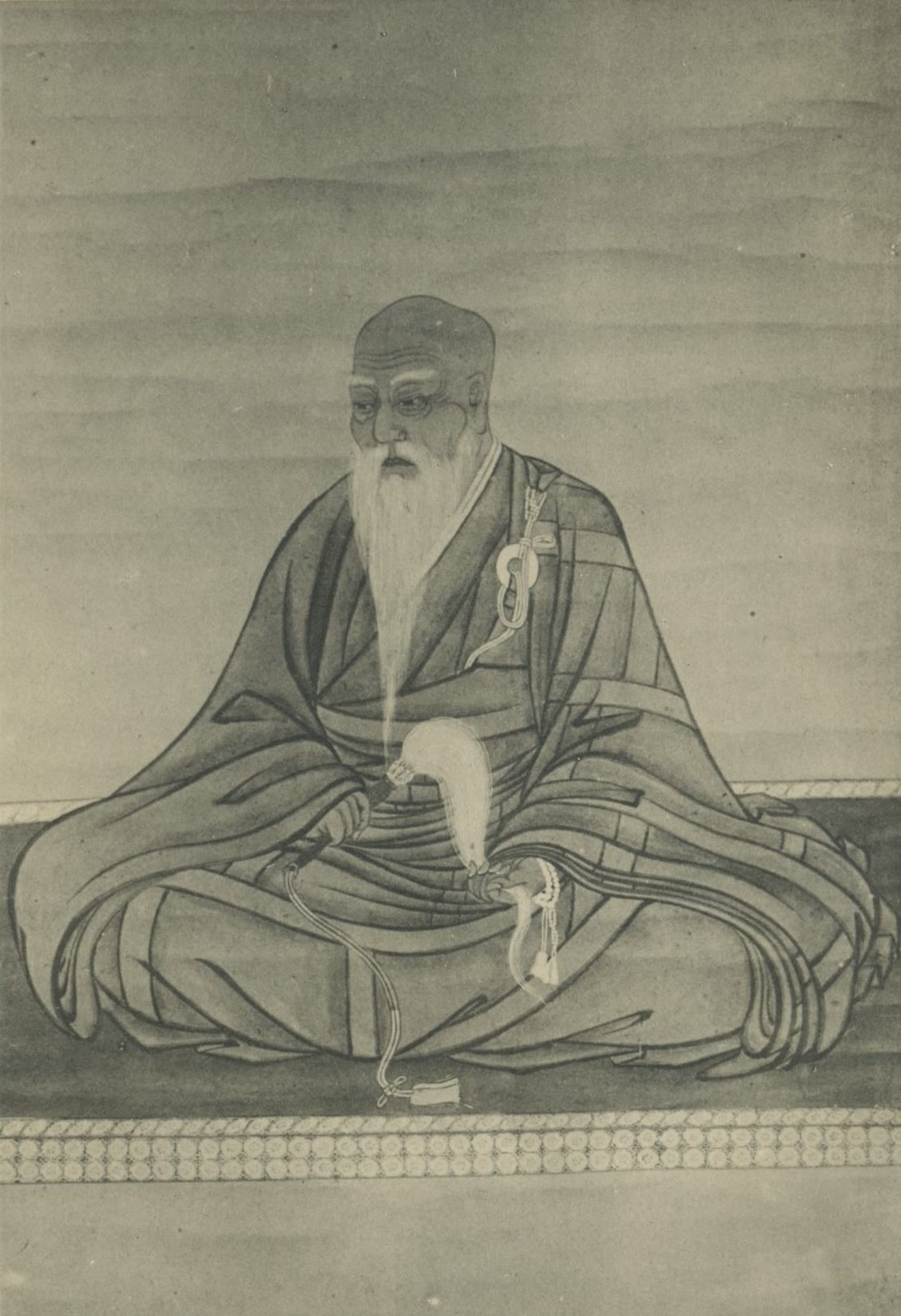
Kujō Hisatada born 5 September

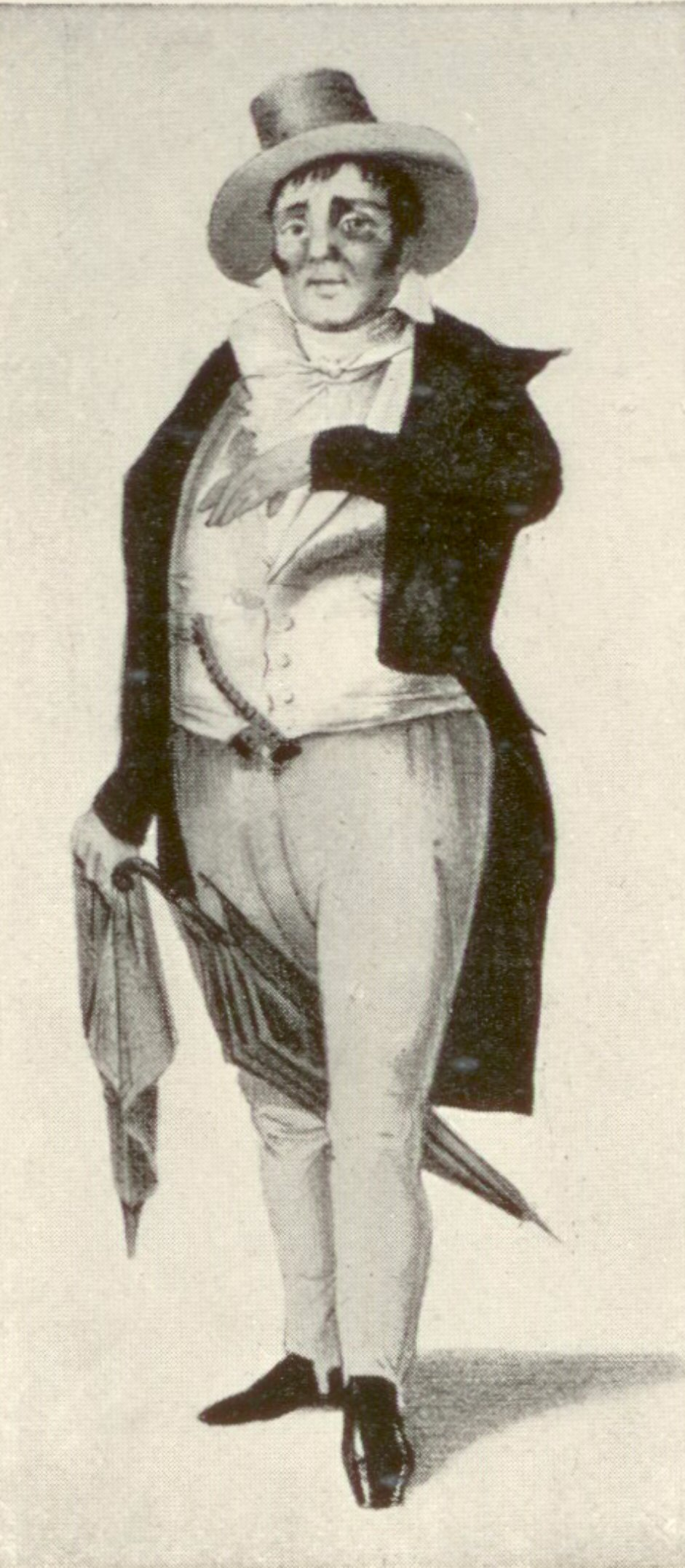
Samuel Friedrich Hassel born 9 September

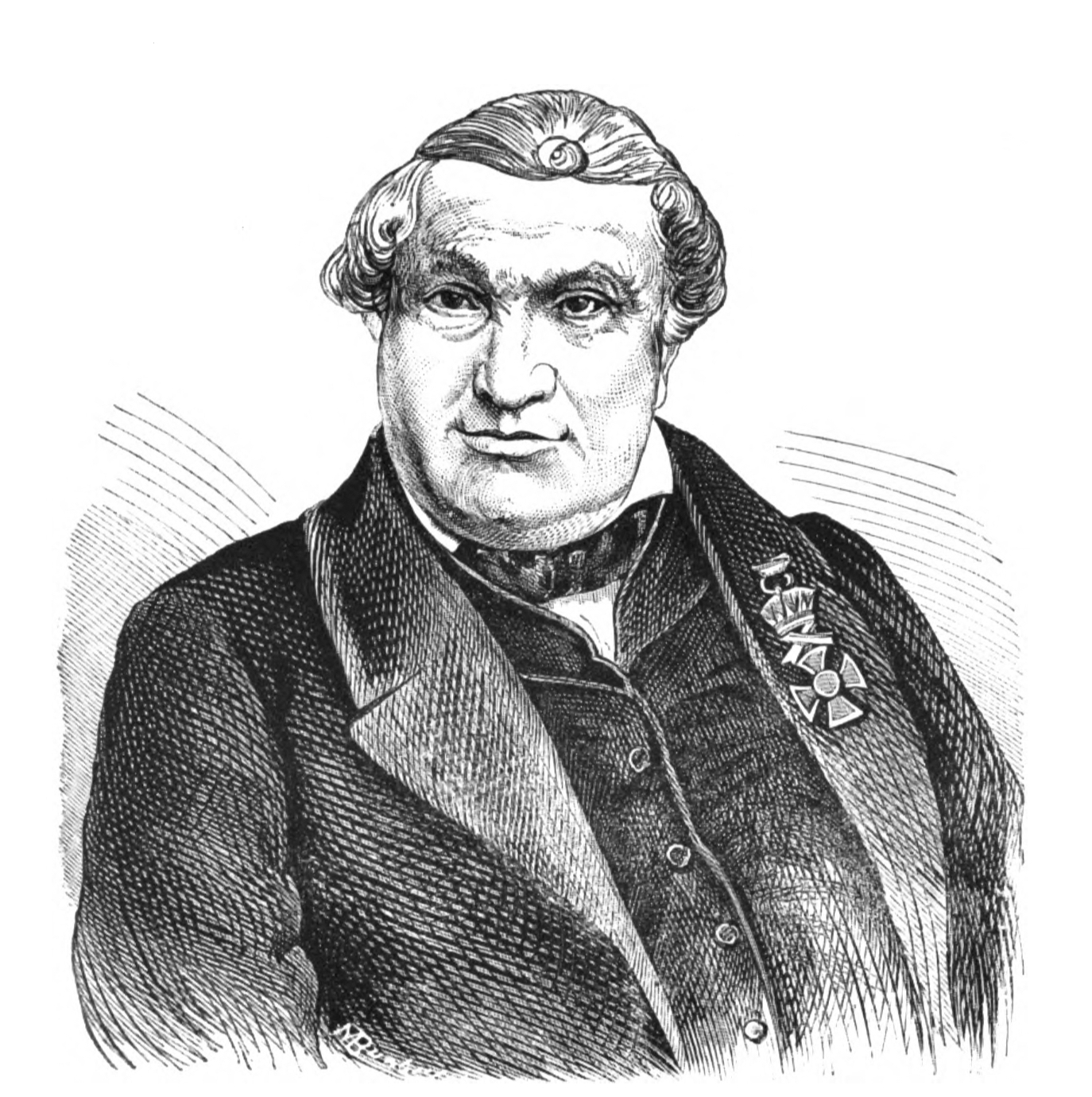
Philipp Schey von Koromla born 20 September

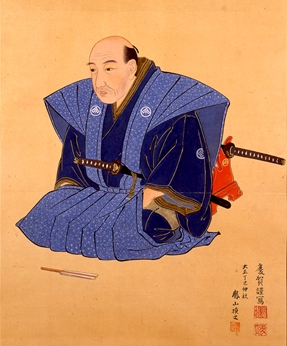
Takashima Shūhan born 24 September

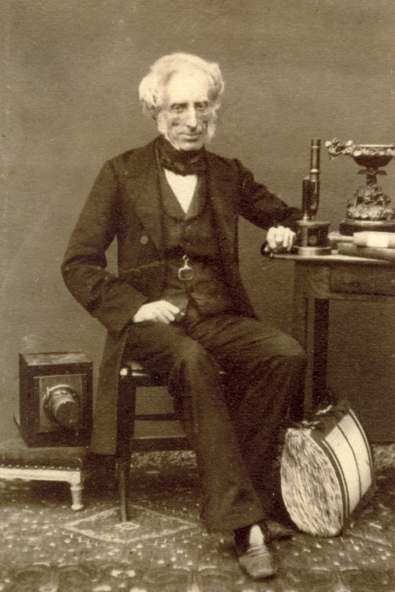
Louis Alphonse de Brébisson born 25 September

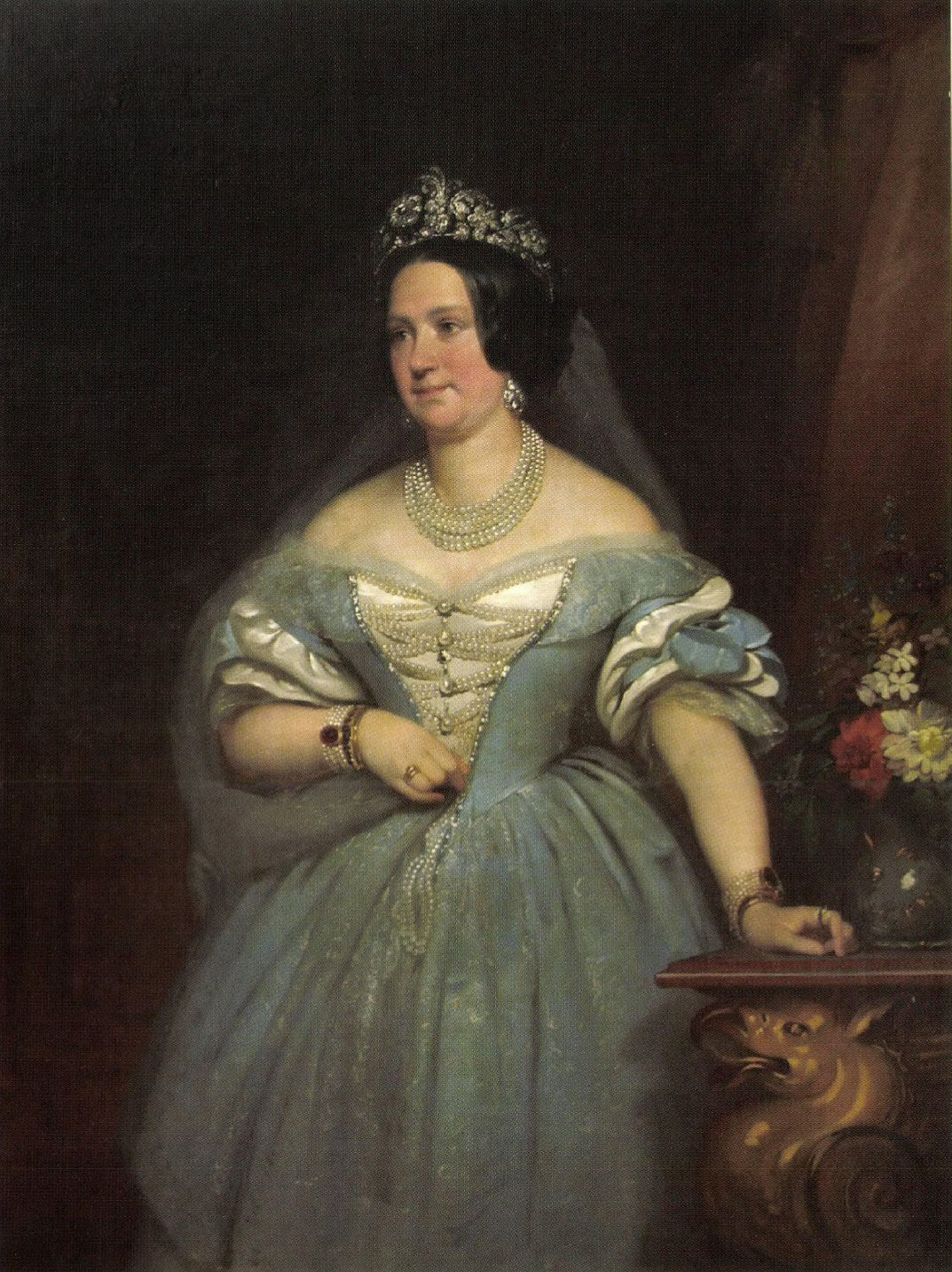
Etelka Szapáry born 26 September

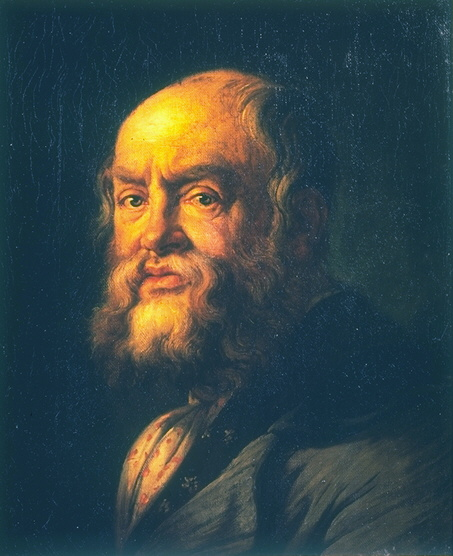
Bonaventura Genelli born 28 September

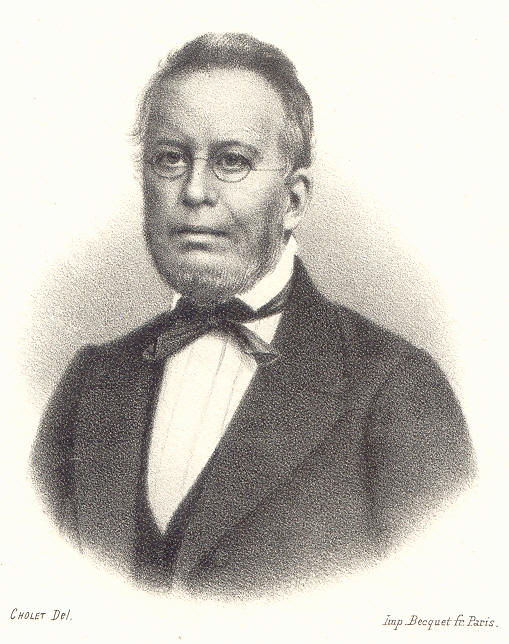
Ange Paulin Terver born 4 October

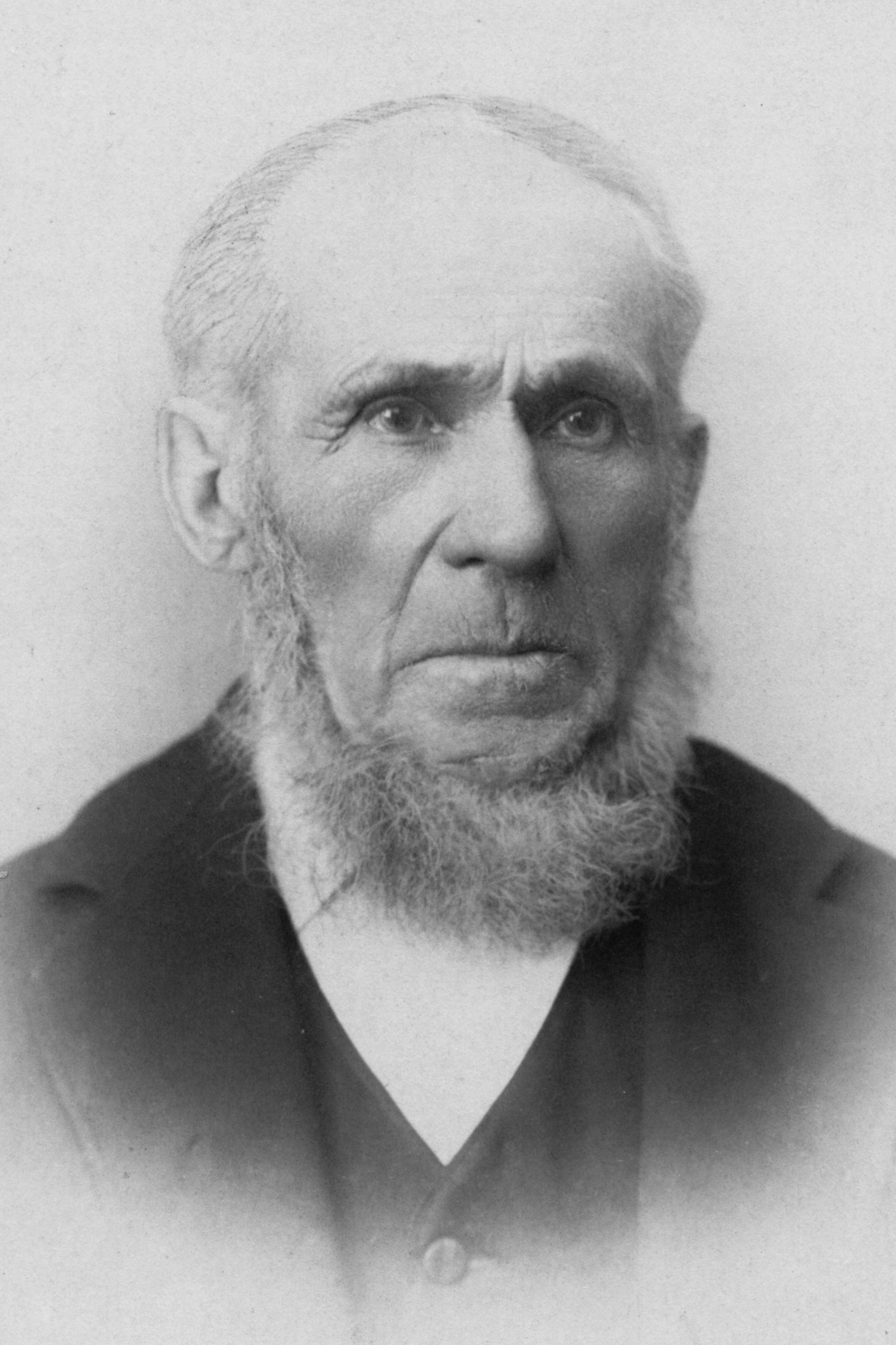
John Byington born 8 October

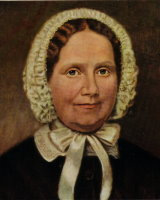
Ida Arenhold born 11 October

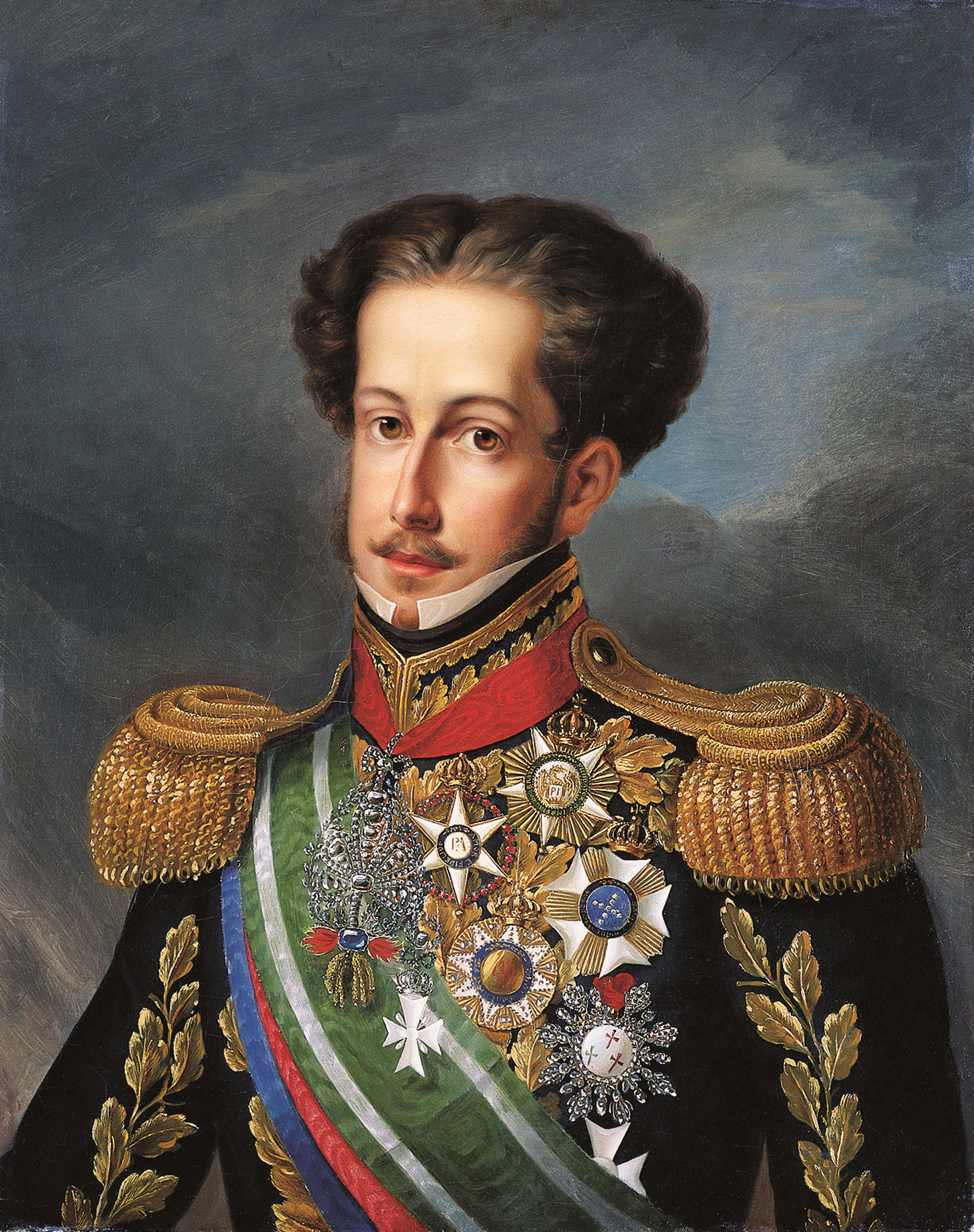
Pedro I of Brazil born 12 October

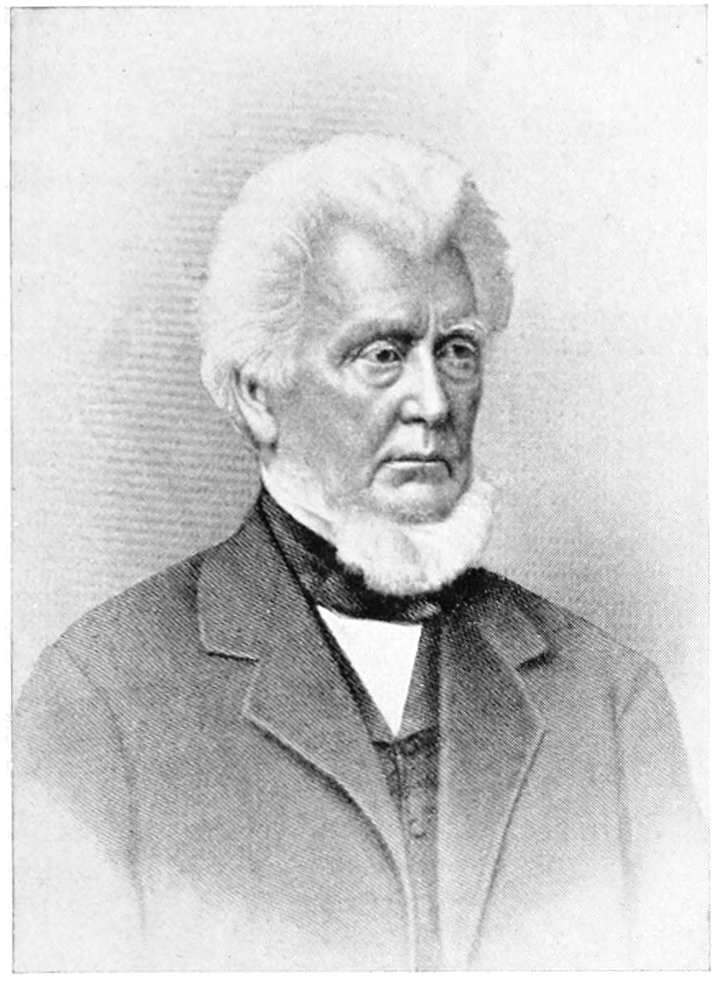
Jesse Olney born 12 October

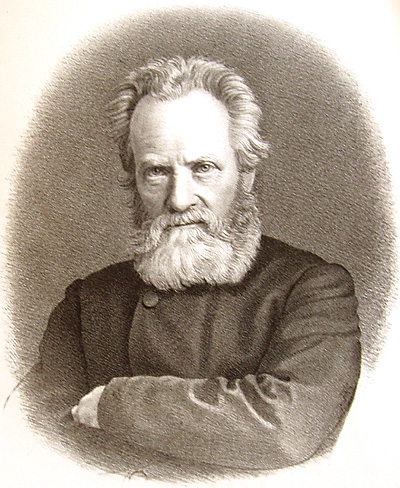
Herman Wilhelm Bissen born 13 October

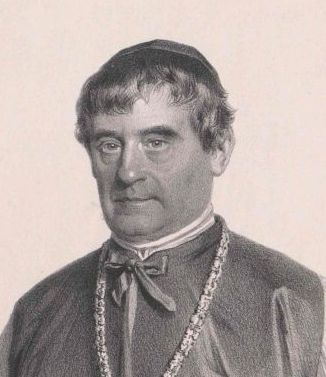
Łukasz Baraniecki born 14 October

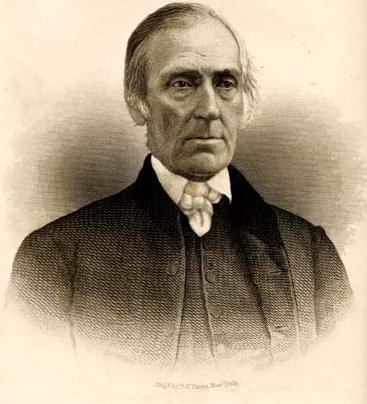
Levi Coffin born 28 October

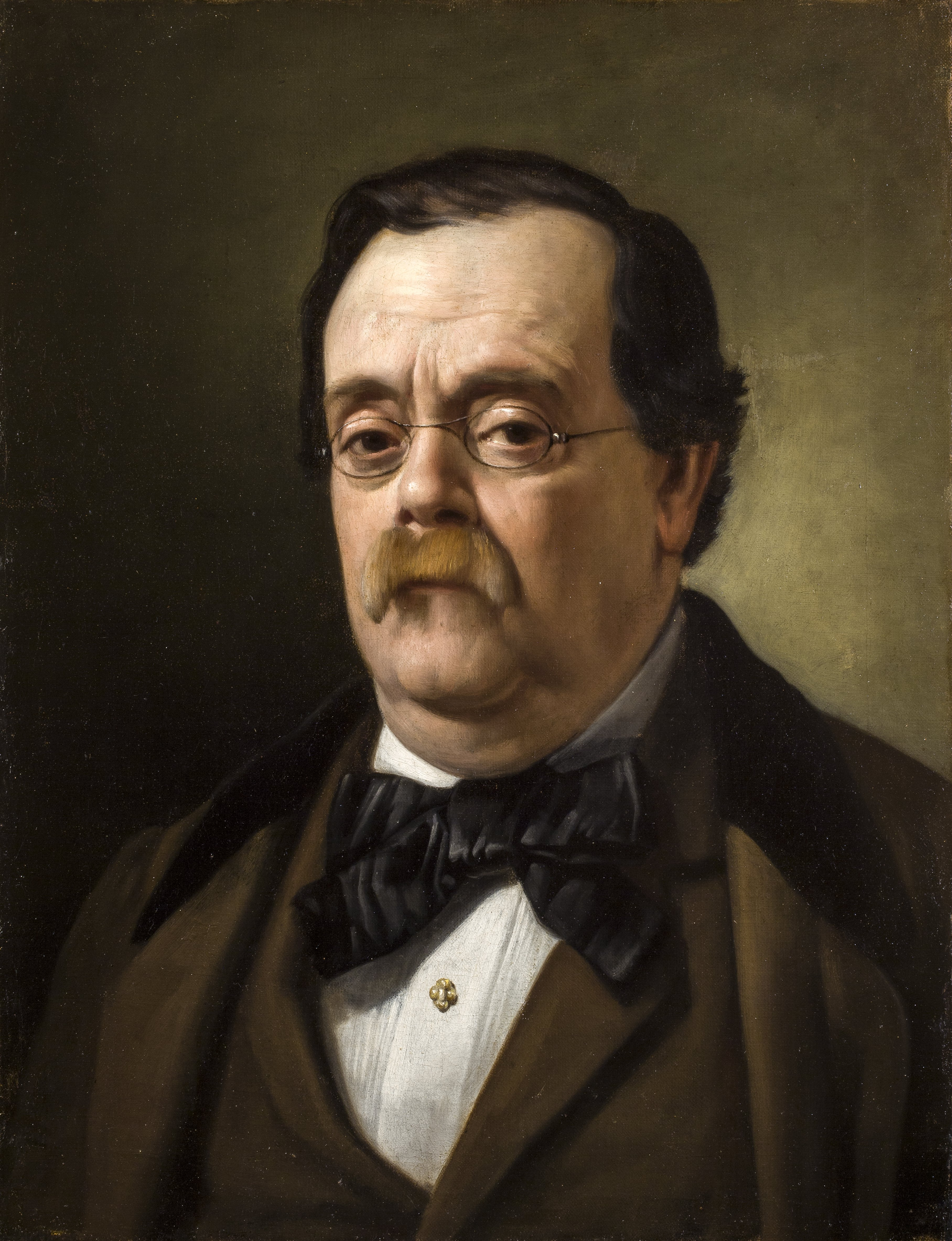
Antonio Cabral Bejarano born 31 October

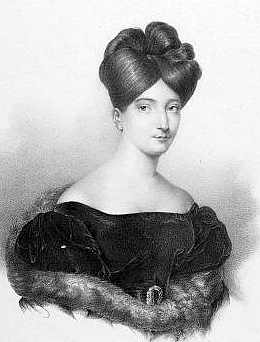
Henriette Méric-Lalande born 4 November

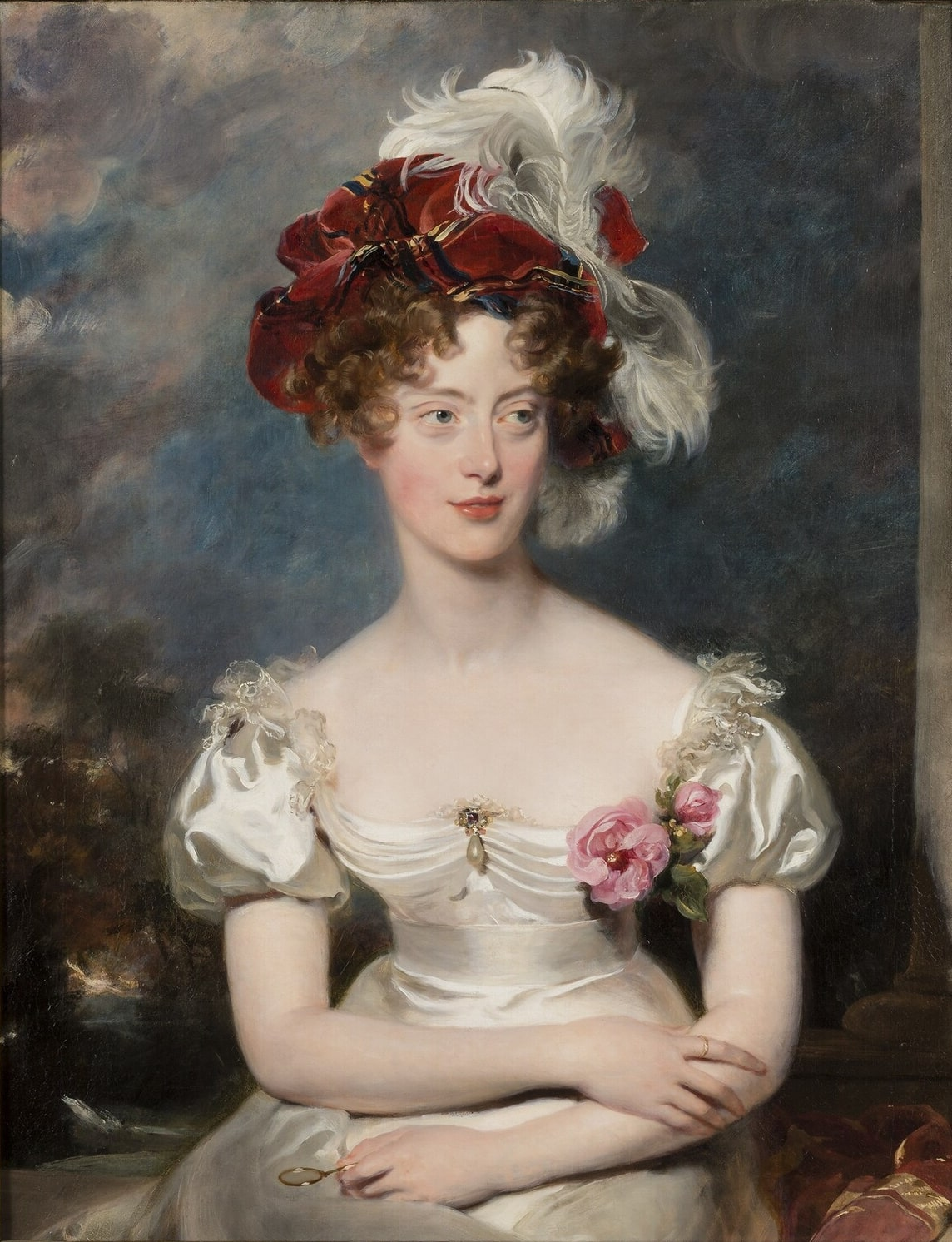
Marie-Caroline of Bourbon-Two Sicilies, Duchess of Berry born 5 November

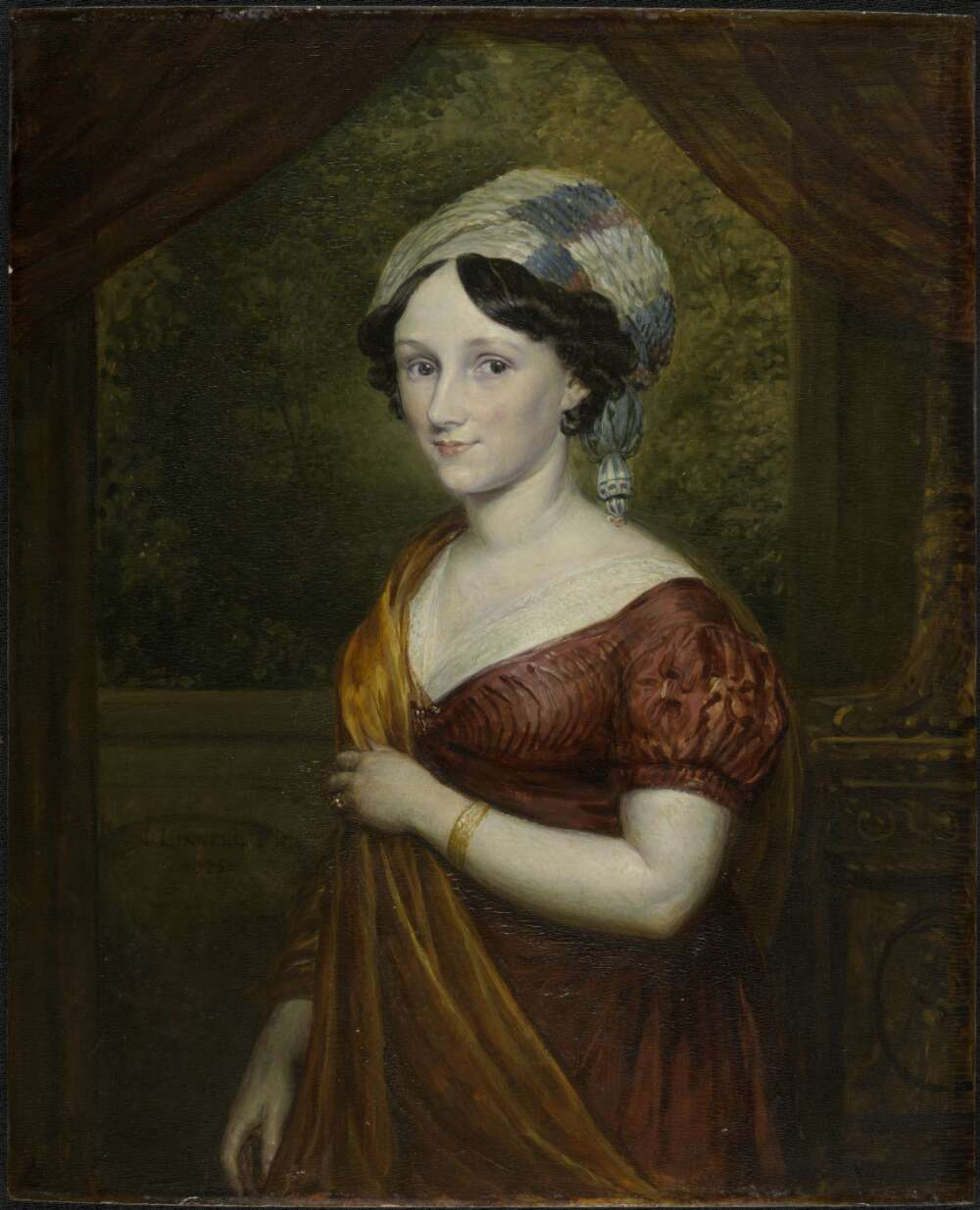
Eliza, Lady Darling born 10 November

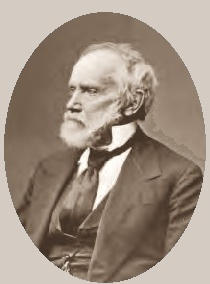
John Amory Lowell born 11 November

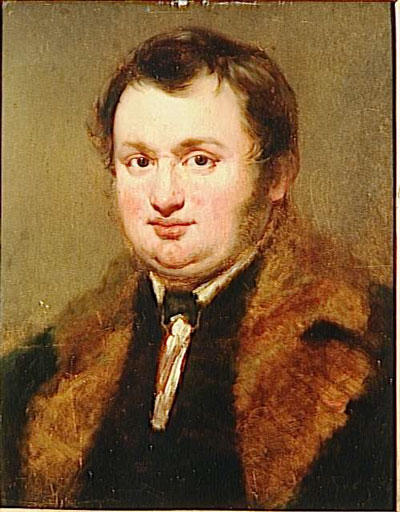
Abel Hugo born 15 November

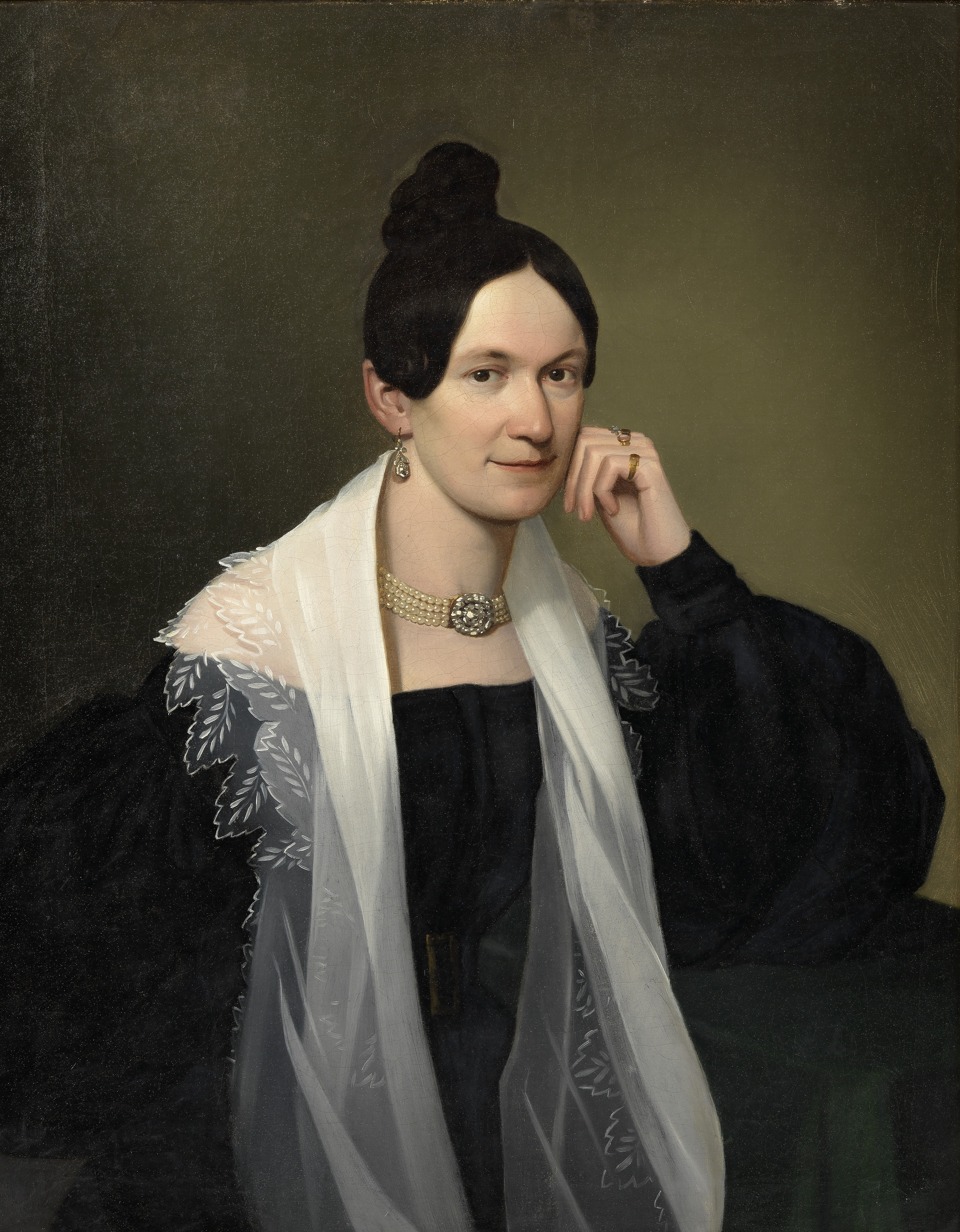
Therese Grob born 16 November

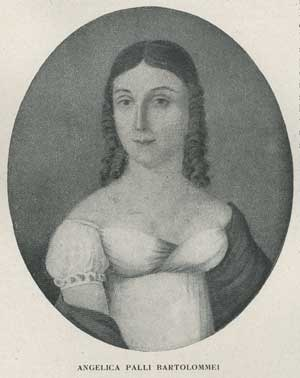
Angeliki Palli born 22 November

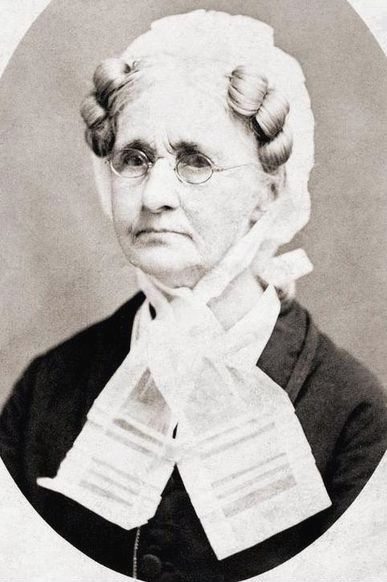
Hannah Simpson Grant born 23 November

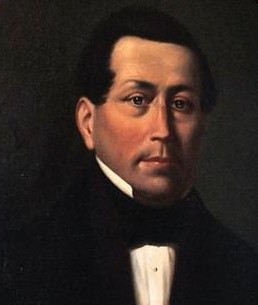
Alonzo Morphy born 23 November

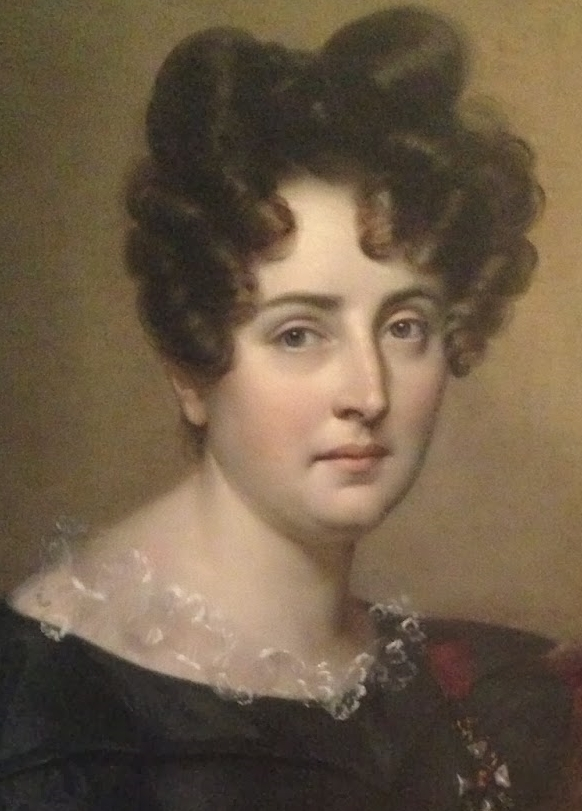
Cora Millet-Robinet born 28 November

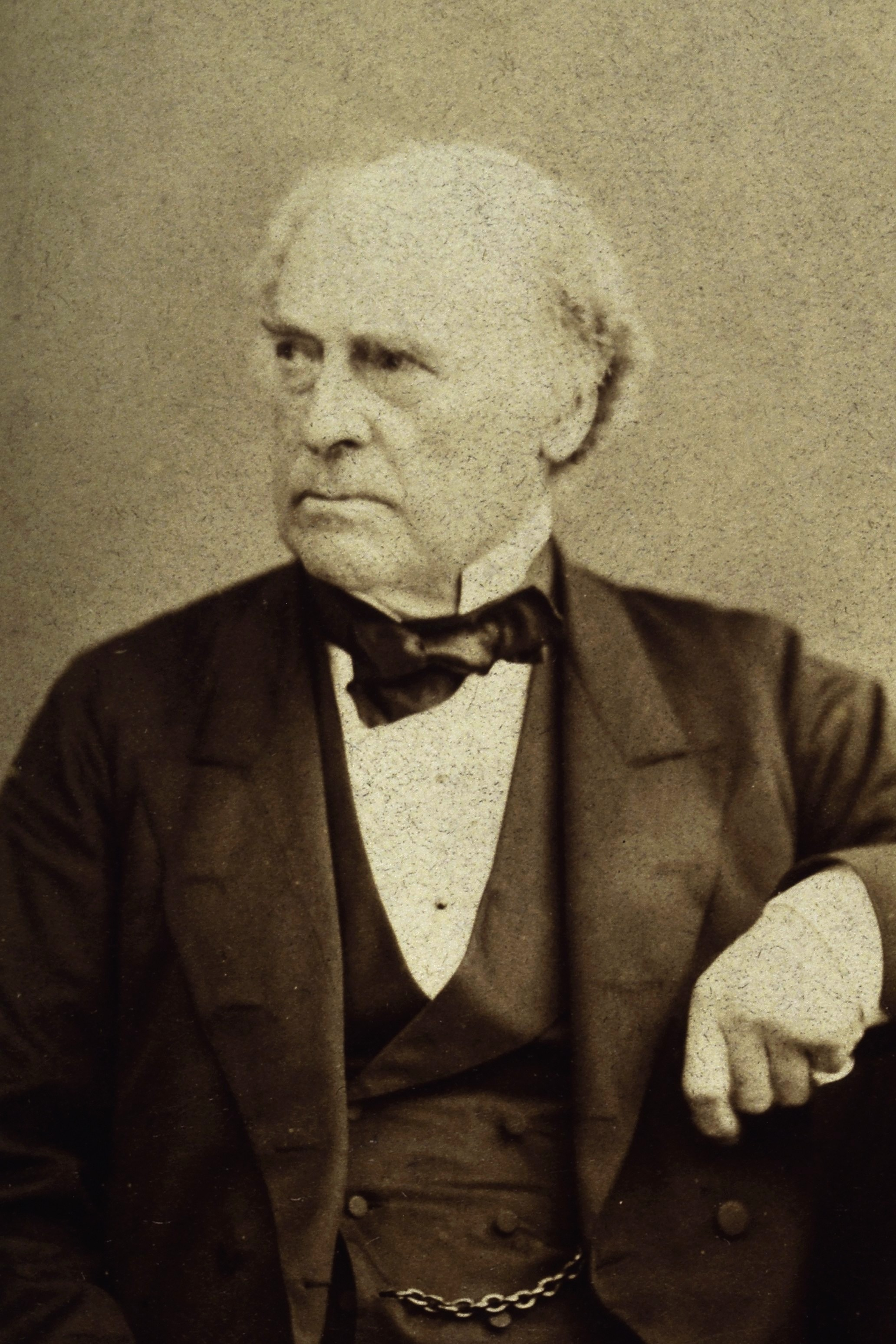
Frederic Carpenter Skey born 1 December

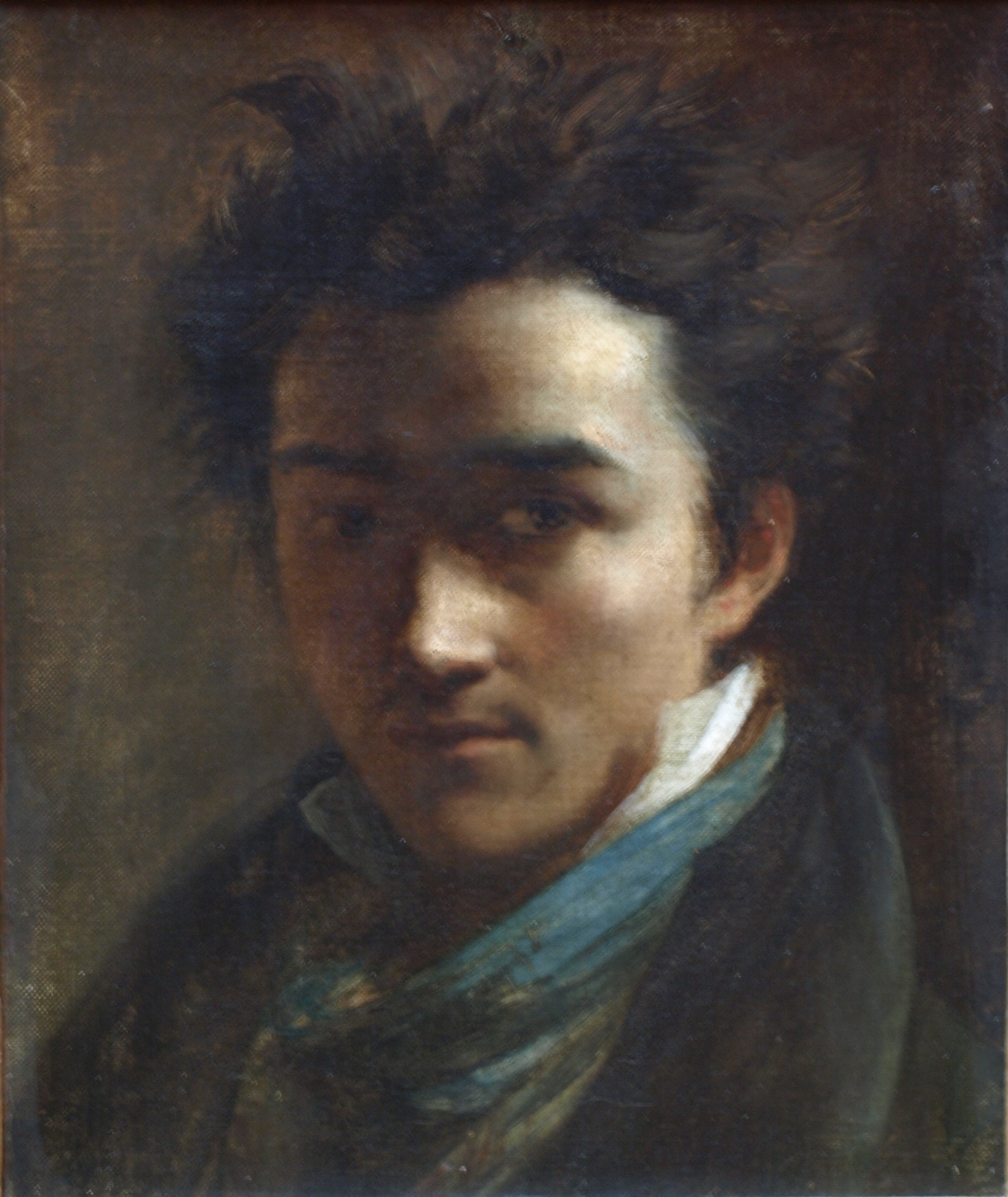
Alexandre-Marie Colin born 5 December

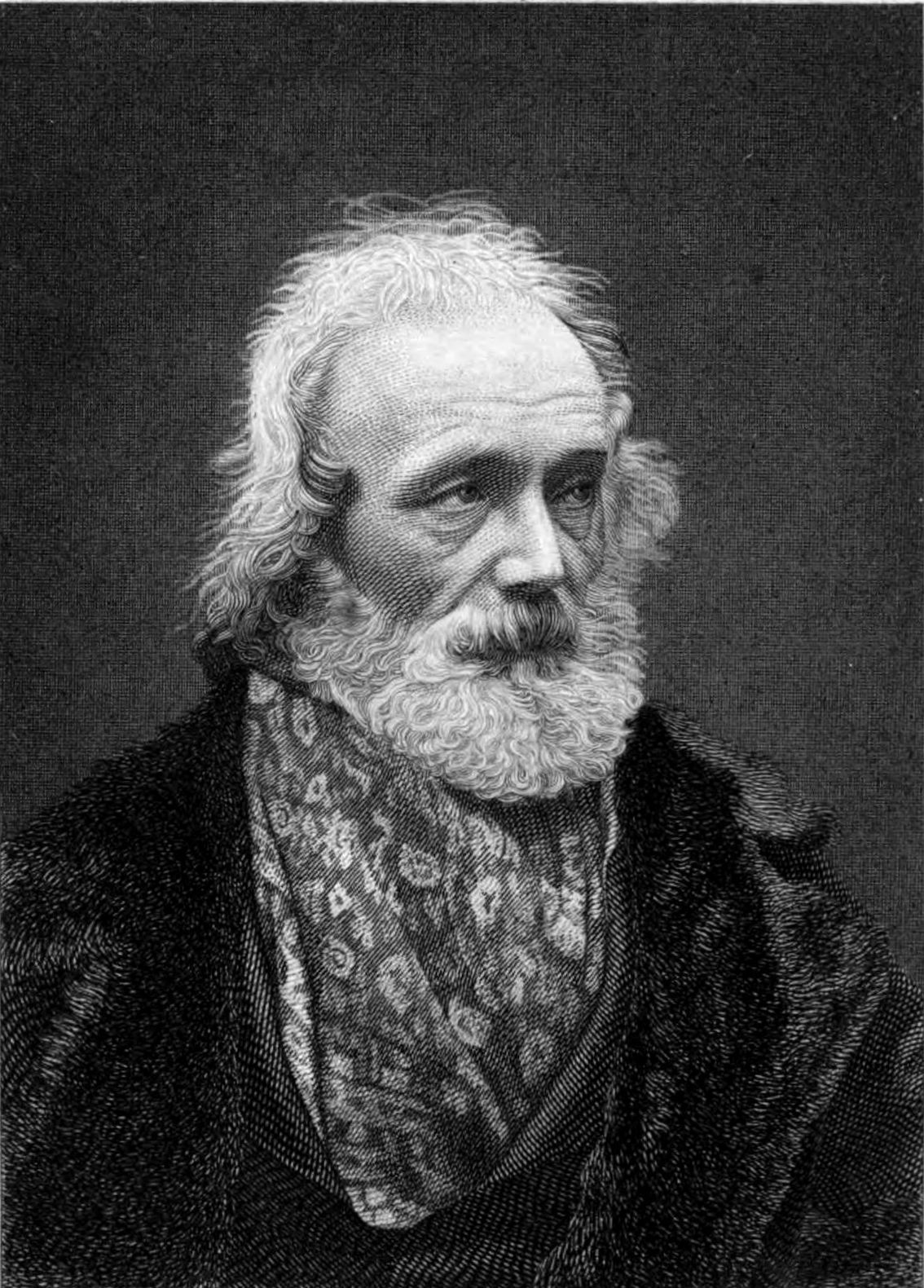
James Henry (poet) born 13 December

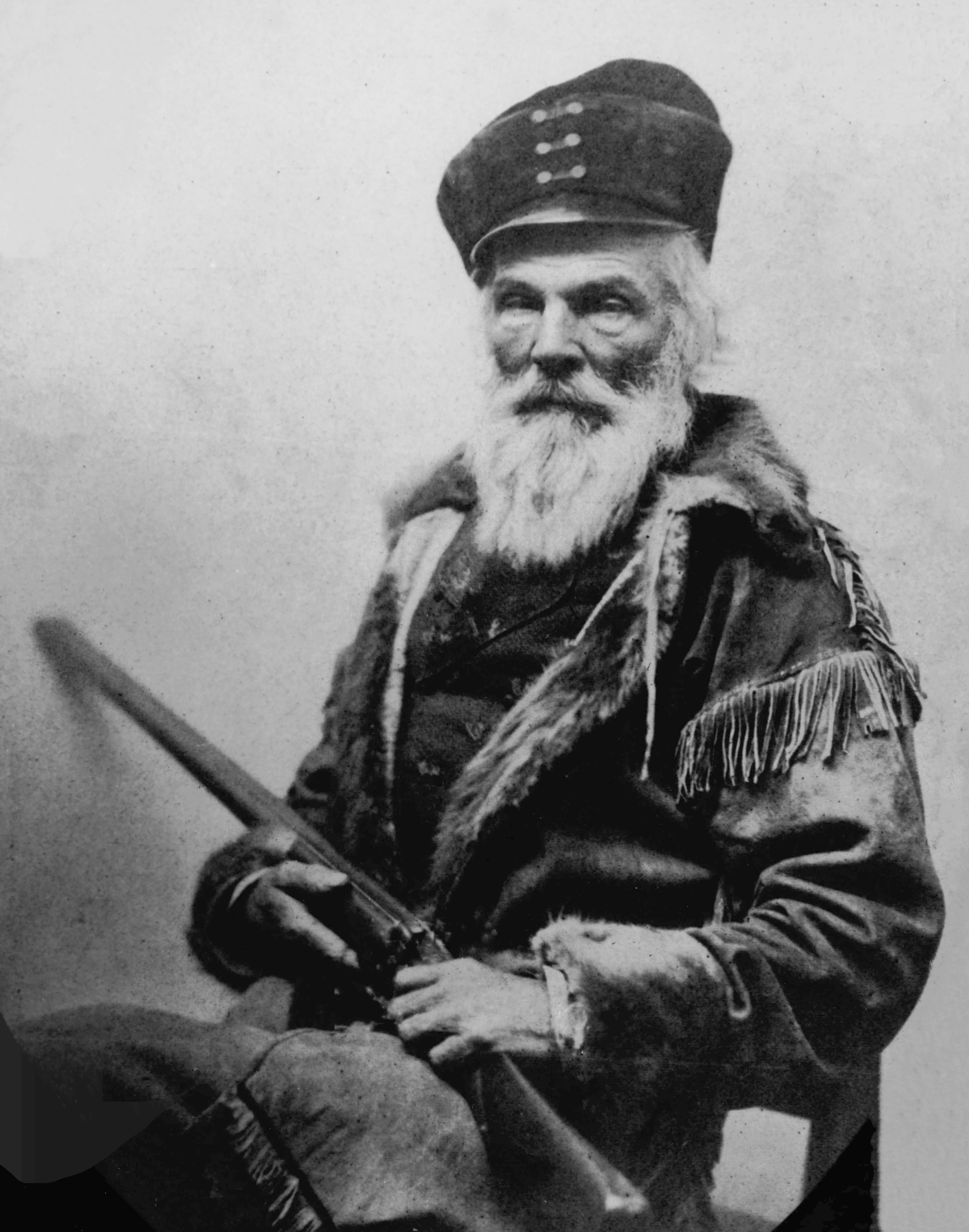
Joseph R. Walker born 13 December

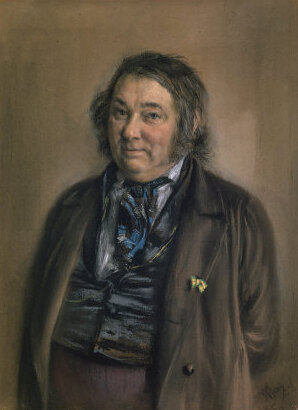
Heinrich Smidt born 18 December

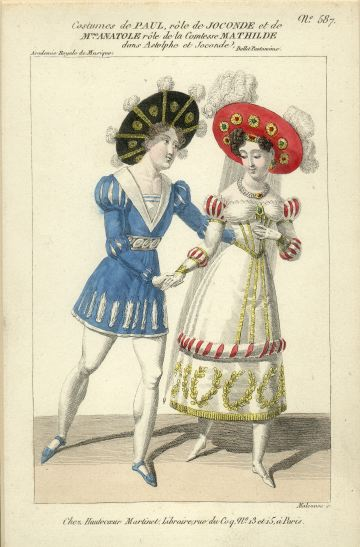
Paul (dancer) born 21 December

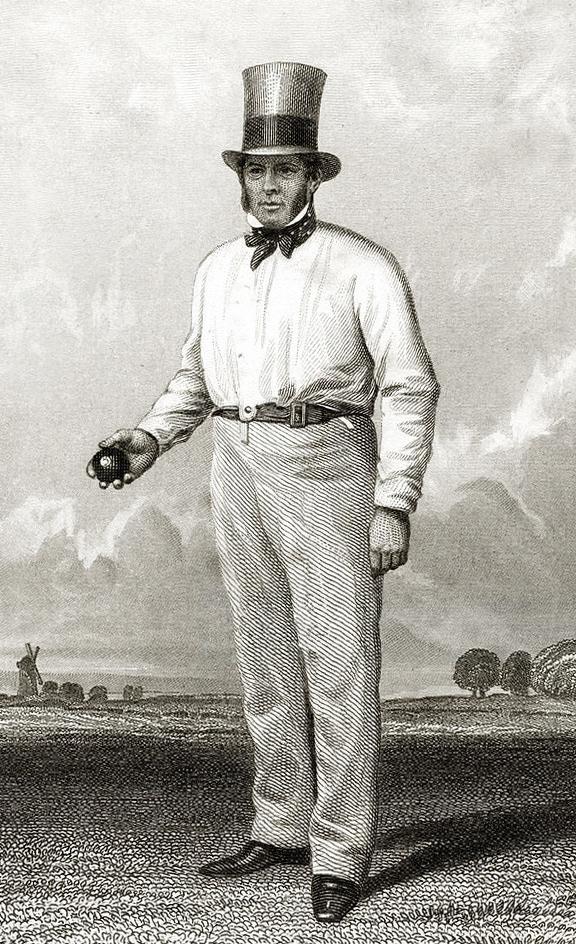
William Clarke born 24 December

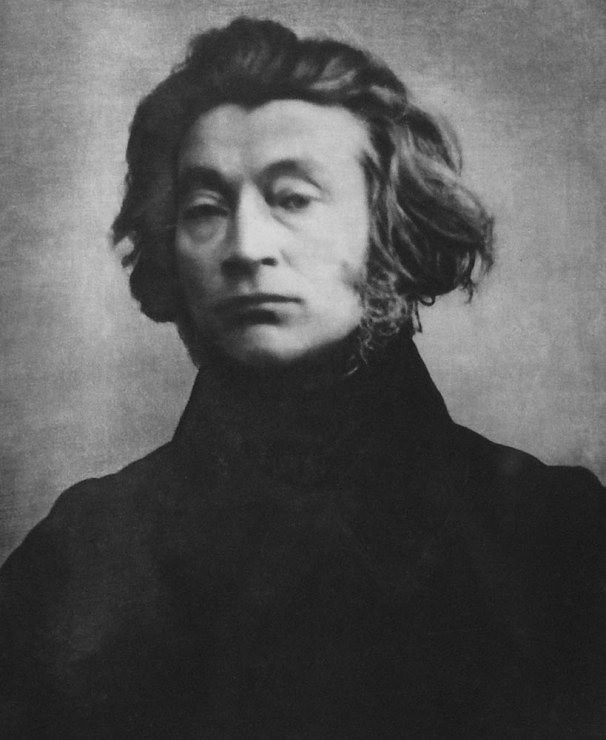
Adam Mickiewicz born 24 December

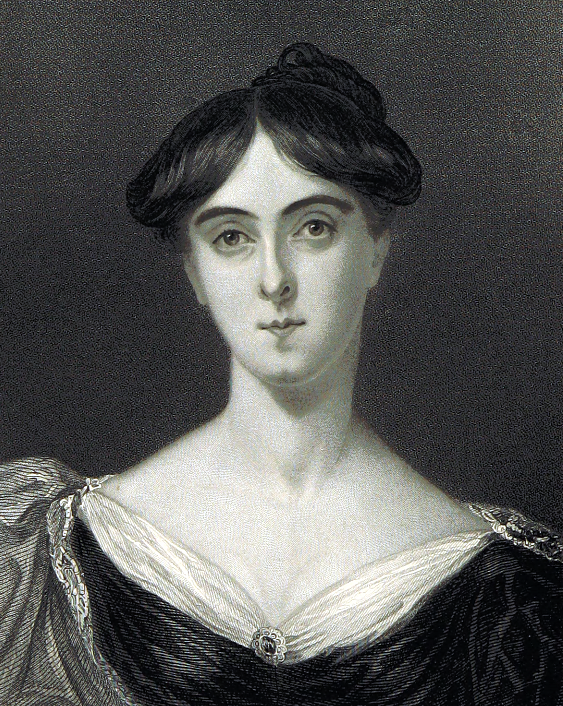
Catherine Grace Godwin born 25 December

=== January ===
- January 1
  - Ryan Brenan, Australian politician, magistrate and coroner (d. 1868)
  - Benjamin Bull, American lawyer and politician (d. 1879)
  - Utagawa Kuniyoshi, Japanese artist (d. 1861)
  - James Macarthur, pastoralist and politician in New South Wales, Australia (d. 1867)
  - Ângelo Carlos Muniz, Brazilian politician (d. 1863)
- January 2 – Désiré-Alexandre Batton, French composer (d. 1855)
- January 4
  - Paul-Adrien Bourdaloue, French civil engineer (d. 1868)
  - William C. Dawson, American politician (d. 1856)
  - Robley Dunglison, physician (d. 1869)
- January 5
  - David Macbeth Moir, Scottish physician and writer (d. 1851)
  - James Semple, American politician from Illinois (d. 1866)
- January 6
  - Melchior von Diepenbrock, Catholic cardinal (d. 1853)
  - Marie Dorval, French actress (d. 1849)
  - Frederick Thellusson, 4th Baron Rendlesham, British politician (d. 1852)
- January 7
  - Giovanni Marghinotti, Italian painter (d. 1865)
  - Marijan Šunjić, Bosnian Franciscan Catholic bishop, writer, scientific and political worker (d. 1860)
- January 8
  - Waddy Thompson Jr., American politician (d. 1868)
  - Giuseppe Rosi, Italian poet and patriot (d. 1891)
  - Robert Meadows White, English priest (d. 1865)
- January 9 – Philippe Joseph Henri Lemaire, French sculptor (d. 1880)
- January 10
  - Carl Heinrich Hertwig, German veterinarian (d. 1881)
  - David P. Mapes, American politician (d. 1890)
  - Federico Sclopis, Italian judge and politician (d. 1878)
- January 14
  - Isaac da Costa, Dutch writer, Jewish poet (d. 1860)
  - William Duncombe, 2nd Baron Feversham, British politician (d. 1867)
  - John Christian Wiltberger Jr., American silversmith and religious activist (d. 1855)
  - Robert N. Martin, American politician (d. 1870)
  - James Swaby, Jamaican man of colour, one of the first non-white commissioned officers in the British Army (d. 1863)
  - Johan Rudolph Thorbecke, Dutch statesman (d. 1872)
- January 15
  - Ammon Brown, American politician (d. 1882)
  - Thomas Crofton Croker, Irish antiquary and artist (d. 1854)
  - Johann Gottlob von Kurr, German pharmacist, botanist and mineralogist (d. 1870)
  - Calvary Morris, American politician (d. 1871)
  - Samuel Stutchbury, British naturalist (d. 1859)
- January 16
  - Chauncey Bulkley, American lawyer (d. 1860)
  - Joshua King, British mathematician (d. 1857)
- January 17
  - Lea Birch, English cricketer (d. 1868)
  - Sir Theodore Brinckman, 1st Baronet, British politician (d. 1880)
  - André Friedrich, French sculptor (d. 1877)
  - Jean-Baptiste Masui, Belgian engineer (d. 1860)
- January 18
  - Augustus Seymour Porter, American politician (d. 1872)
  - William Bennett Webster, Canadian politician (d. 1861)
  - Christian Whitmer, Book of Mormon witness (d. 1835)
- January 19
  - Auguste Comte, French philosopher, pioneer of positivism (d. 1857)
  - Samuel Worcester, Christian missionary to Cherokee, civil rights advocate (d. 1859)
- January 20
  - Anson Jones, 5th and last President of the Republic of Texas (d. 1858)
  - Charles Varin, French writer (d. 1869)
- January 21 – Jane Williams, Shelley's muse (d. 1884)
- January 22
  - Charles Davies, American mathematician (d. 1876)
  - Robert Unwin Harwood, Canadian politician (d. 1863)
  - Ciro Menotti, Italian patriot (d. 1831)
- January 23 – Joan Cornelis Reynst, Dutch politician (d. 1871)
- January 24
  - Henry Addison, American mayor (d. 1870)
  - Théodore Caruelle d'Aligny, French painter (d. 1871)
  - Karl von Holtei, German actor (d. 1880)
  - Karl Georg Christian von Staudt, German geometer (d. 1867)
- January 25 – Richard William Jelf, British academic (d. 1871)
- January 27
  - George Clarke, New Zealand missionary, teacher, public servant, politician, judge (d. 1875)
  - Thekchok Dorje, 14th Karmapa Lama, Tibetan Lama (d. 1868)
  - Darius Mead, American politician (d. 1859)
- January 28
  - Henry J. Ripley, American baptist clergyman and biblical scholar (d. 1875)
  - Marcus Sandys, 3rd Baron Sandys, British politician (d. 1863)
  - Basil Manly Sr., American minister (d. 1868)
- January 29
  - Patrick Bellew, 1st Baron Bellew, British politician (d. 1866)
  - Simeon Borden, American civil engineer (d. 1856)
  - Henry Neele, poet (d. 1828)
- January 30
  - Manuel Francisco Pavón Aycinena, conservative Guatemalan politician (d. 1855)
  - Barker Burnell, American politician (d. 1843)
  - Daniel Bailey Ryall, American politician (d. 1864)
- January 31
  - Hans Ernst Krøyer, Danish composer (d. 1879)
  - Carl Gottlieb Reissiger, German musician (d. 1859)
  - John Summerfield, Methodist evangelist, co-founder American Tract Society (d. 1825)
  - Ana Gruzinskaya Tolstaya, Georgian princess (d. 1889)

=== February ===
- February 1
  - Hannah Bevan, English philanthropist (d. 1874)
  - Willard Chase, American treasure hunter (d. 1871)
- February 2
  - John Warner Barber, American historian (d. 1885)
  - John Brogden, British railway contractor and promoter (d. 1869)
  - Stephen Mack Jr., American pioneer (d. 1850)
  - Bernard Jullien, linguist (d. 1881)
  - Henry Robinson-Montagu, 6th Baron Rokeby, British Army general (d. 1883)
- February 3
  - William Hill, Irish architect (d. 1844)
  - Nathaniel Morren, Church of Scotland minister and church historian (d. 1847)
  - Daniel Sandford, Scottish politician and Greek scholar (d. 1838)
  - Christian Julius Wilhelm Schiede, German botanist (d. 1836)
- February 4
  - John Cochrane, Scottish lawyer and chess player (d. 1878)
  - Calvin Fletcher, American judge (d. 1866)
  - Adrian Janes, American businessman (d. 1869)
  - Otani Nobutomo, Japanese martial artist (d. 1864)
- February 5
  - Olympe-Philippe Gerbet, French bishop (d. 1864)
  - Pierre-Gustave Joly de Lotbinière, French businessman and photographer (d. 1865)
  - George James Turner, English judge and politician (d. 1867)
- February 6
  - Charles Dupeuty, French librettist and playwright (d. 1865)
  - James Saurin, Anglican priest, Archdeacon of Dromore (d. 1879)
- February 7
  - Eugène Goyet, French painter (d. 1857)
  - Bolette Puggaard, Danish painter (d. 1847)
  - William Tite, British architect and politician (d. 1873)
  - Harriet Waylett, English actress and theatre manager (d. 1851)
- February 8 – Grand Duke Michael Pavlovich of Russia, Russian Grand Duke (d. 1849)
- February 9
  - John Farmer, American educator and cartographer (d. 1859)
  - Christian Friedrich Koch, German writer (d. 1872)
  - Abel Stearns, American mayor (d. 1871)
- February 10 – Niels Nielsen Vogt, Norwegian politician (d. 1869)
- February 11
  - James Bacon, British judge (d. 1895)
  - Johann Schroth, Austrian physician (d. 1856)
  - Alvin Smith, Later Day Saints Smith family member (d. 1823)
  - Joseph Vann, Cherokee leader and businessman (d. 1844)
- February 12 – Edward John Carlos, English writer on architecture (d. 1851)
- February 13
  - Heinrich Alexander von Arnim, Prussian statesman (d. 1861)
  - Samuel Dunn, British minister (d. 1882)
  - Jules Renouard, French publisher and private banker (d. 1854)
- February 14
  - Benjamin Tett, politician (d. 1878)
  - Prosper Wetmore, author (d. 1876)
  - Searles Valentine Wood, English palaeontologist (d. 1880)
- February 15
  - Heinrich Beitzke, German historian (d. 1867)
  - Marie-Guillaume-Alphonse Devergie, French dermatologist (d. 1879)
  - Jean Étienne Duby, Swiss clergyman and botanist (d. 1885)
- February 16 – Richard Mills, English cricketer (d. 1882)
- February 17
  - Friedrich Eduard Beneke, German psychologist & scholar (d. 1854)
  - Charles Macalester, American businessman, banker and philanthropist (d. 1873)
  - Josef Matěj Navrátil, Czech painter (d. 1865)
  - Ann Agnes Trail, Roman Catholic nun and artist (d. 1872)
- February 18
  - Adalbert von Ladenberg, Prussian politician (d. 1855)
  - José Hilario López, President of Colombia (d. 1869)
- February 19
  - William Best, 2nd Baron Wynford, British Baron and politician (d. 1869)
  - Allan MacNab, Canadian politician (d. 1862)
- February 20
  - Adolf Ferdinand Wenceslaus Brix, German mathematician (d. 1870)
  - Richard M. Young, American politician (d. 1861)
- February 21
  - John William Bowden, British minister (d. 1844)
  - Wilhelm Esser, German philosopher, classical philologist, university teacher (d. 1854)
  - Lubize, French playwright (d. 1863)
- February 22
  - Samuel Price Carson, American politician and farmer (d. 1838)
  - Gustave Drouineau, French playwright (d. 1878)
  - Charles Émile Seurre, French artist (d. 1858)
  - Charles Mynn Thruston, Union Army general (d. 1873)
- February 23 – Ichabod Spencer, American minister (d. 1854)
- February 24 – Daniel Massey, blacksmith, businessman (d. 1856)
- February 25
  - William Claiborne Dunlap, American politician (d. 1872)
  - Thomas Napier Thomson, Scottish minister and writer (d. 1869)
- February 26 – Amy and Isaac Post, Hicksite Quakers from New York (d. 1872)
- February 27
  - Marshall Chapin, American mayor (d. 1836)
  - Daniel Wakefield, judge in New Zealand (d. 1858)
- February 28
  - Étienne Rouchouze, Missionary and bishop (d. 1843)
  - Johann Jakob Ulrich, painter from Switzerland (d. 1877)

=== March ===
- March 1
  - Princess Louise of Anhalt-Dessau (d. 1858)
  - Archduchess Clementina of Austria (d. 1881)
  - Gregory VI of Constantinople, patriarch of Constantinople (d. 1881)
- March 2
  - Robert Fox, British antiquarian (d. 1843)
  - William Ketchum, 14th mayor of Buffalo, NY (d. 1876)
- March 3 – Daniel Eliott, British translator (d. 1872)
- March 4
  - John Joseph Abercrombie, Union Army general (d. 1877)
  - Sigurður Breiðfjörð, Icelandic poet (d. 1846)
  - John Nicholson Campbell, Chaplain of the US House of Representatives (d. 1864)
  - Charles Dezobry, French writer and historian (d. 1871)
  - Giovanni Inchindi, opera singer (d. 1876)
- March 5
  - Richard Bond, American architect (d. 1861)
  - Samuel Atkins Eliot, US politician (d. 1862)
  - William Greenway, English cricketer (d. 1868)
- March 6
  - Gottlieb Göttlich, German intersex man (d. 1832)
  - Jacques Jasmin, Occitan poet (d. 1864)
  - George R. Noyes, American scholar (d. 1868)
- March 8
  - Mathew Caldwell, Texan settler (d. 1842)
  - Heinrich Wilhelm Ferdinand Wackenroder, German chemist (d. 1854)
- March 9
  - Mathilda Berwald, Finnish and Swedish concert singer (d. 1877)
  - Udagawa Yōan, Japanese scientist (d. 1846)
- March 10
  - John Holladay, American Mormon pioneer (d. 1862)
  - Pierre Frédéric Sarrus, French mathematician (d. 1861)
- March 11
  - Thomas Fremantle, 1st Baron Cottesloe, British politician (d. 1890)
  - Jan Gaykema Jacobsz., Dutch painter and draughtsman of plants (d. 1875)
- March 12
  - Charles Abbot, 2nd Baron Colchester, British Royal Navy admiral (d. 1867)
  - Elizabeth Goodridge, American artist (d. 1882)
  - Ivan Sherwood Verny, Russian Imperial Army officer of English descent (d. 1867)
- March 13
  - Abigail Fillmore, wife of US President Millard Fillmore (d. 1853)
  - Walter Hook, English cleric, Dean of Chichester (d. 1875)
  - Robert Clark Morgan, British missionary (d. 1864)
  - Charles des Moulins, French botanist and malacologist (d. 1875)
  - Friedrich Christian Gregor Wernekinck, German anatomist (d. 1835)
- March 15
  - Michael Pease Calvert, British painter (d. 1875)
  - William Pickering, Governor of Washington territory (d. 1873)
- March 17
  - John Samuel Blunt, American painter (d. 1835)
  - John Bennett Dawson, American politician (d. 1845)
  - Jacob Ettlinger, German rabbi (d. 1871)
  - John Lofland, American writer (d. 1849)
- March 18
  - Henry B. Cowles, American politician (d. 1873)
  - Robert Milner Echols, American politician, soldier (d. 1847)
  - Daniel Frederik Eschricht, Danish physician and zoologist (d. 1863)
  - Francis Lieber, German-American jurist, gymnast and political philosopher (d. 1872)
  - Mubarez-ud-Daulah, member of the Asaf Jahi dynasty of Hyderabad State (d. 1854)
  - Gustav Rose, German mineralogist and university teacher (d. 1873)
  - William Wheelwright, American businessman (d. 1873)
- March 20
  - Anna Bondra, Austrian soprano (d. 1836)
  - Thomas Crimble, English cricketer (d. 1873)
  - Sophia Fowler Gallaudet, deaf educator and wife of Thomas Hopkins Gallaudet (d. 1877)
  - James De La Montanya, American politician (d. 1849)
- March 21 – Chester P. Butler, American politician (d. 1850)
- March 22
  - Richard McDonald Caunter, British soldier and Church of England clergyman (d. 1879)
  - Joachim Otto Voigt, German-Danish botanist and surgeon (d. 1843)
- March 23 – Christiane Bøcher, Norwegian actress (d. 1874)
- March 24
  - Epaphroditus Ransom, American politician (d. 1859)
  - Richard F. Simpson, American politician (d. 1882)
- March 25
  - Corvo Attano, fictional character, Royal Protector, assassin (d. unknown)
  - Christoph Gudermann, German mathematician (d. 1852)
- March 26 – Robert Handyside, Lord Handyside, Scottish lawyer, judge, Solicitor General for Scotland (d. 1858)
- March 27
  - Charles Joseph, comte Bresson, French diplomat (d. 1847)
  - Juana María de los Dolores de León Smith, Spanish noble (d. 1872)
- March 28
  - Joseph Franz, Prince of Dietrichstein, German prince (d. 1858)
  - John Townshend, 4th Marquess Townshend, British Royal Navy admiral (d. 1863)
- March 29
  - Jane Spencer-Churchill, Duchess of Marlborough, 1st wife of George Spencer, 6th Duke (d. 1897)
  - Isaac J. Ullman, American politician (d. 1866)
- March 30
  - Luise Hensel, German writer (d. 1876)
  - Torsten Rudenschöld, Swedish educator and social reformer (d. 1859)
- March 31
  - Charles Anthony, legislative leader and politician in Ohio (d. 1862)
  - Ernesto Capocci, Italian mathematician, astronomer and politician (d. 1864)
  - Lewis Cary, American silversmith (d. 1834)
  - François-Romain Lhérisson, Haitian poet and educator (d. 1859)
  - Carl Gottlieb Peschel, German painter (d. 1879)
  - Jakub Tatarkiewicz, Polish sculptor (d. 1854)
  - John Westenra, politician (d. 1874)

=== April ===
- April 1
  - Jean-Baptiste Glaire, French academic (d. 1879)
  - George Gilliam Steele, American architect (d. 1855)
- April 2
  - John Green Chambers, American physician, pharmacist, politician (d. 1884)
  - August Heinrich Hoffmann von Fallersleben, German scholar and poet (d. 1874)
  - Alexander De Witt, American politician (d. 1879)
- April 3
  - John Banim, Irish writer (d. 1842)
  - Louis Lacoste, Canadian politician (d. 1878)
  - Charles Wilkes, US naval officer and explorer (d. 1877)
- April 4 – Charles Symmes, Canadian politician (d. 1868)
- April 5
  - Jonas Chickering, US piano manufacturer (d. 1853)
  - Marie Amélie Cogniet, French painter (d. 1869)
  - Jean-Jacques-Joseph Leroy d'Etiolles, French surgeon (d. 1860)
  - John Harfield Tredgold, British pharmacist (d. 1842)
  - Louis-Désiré Véron, French politician and opera director (d. 1867)
- April 6
  - James Beckwourth, American mountain man (d. 1866)
  - Jonas Wallström, Swedish decorative painter (d. 1862)
- April 7 – Félix Chadenet, French politician (d. 1874)
- April 8
  - Joel Hayden, American lieutenant governor of Massachusetts (d. 1873)
  - Levin M. Powell, American military officer (d. 1885)
  - Ramón de la Sagra, Spanish economist, sociologist, botanist, political writer (d. 1871)
  - Dionysios Solomos, Greek poet (d. 1857)
- April 9
  - Arphaxed Loomis, American politician (d. 1885)
  - Frederik Thorkildsen Wexschall, Classical violinist (d. 1845)
- April 10
  - Walter Frederick Campbell, British politician (d. 1855)
  - William Greenwood, cricketer (d. 1872)
  - Amasa Sprague, American businessman and politician (d. 1843)
  - John Lewis Wolfe, architect (d. 1881)
- April 11
  - Pierce Mason Butler, American politician (d. 1846)
  - Joseph N. Chambers, American politician and Army officer (d. 1874)
  - Macedonio Melloni, English army officer and politician (d. 1847)
  - Alfred V. du Pont, American chemist and industrialist (d. 1856)
- April 12
  - Elijah Fordham, American missionary (d. 1879)
  - Ambrogio Frangiolli, Italian painter (d. 1870)
  - Caleb S. Layton, American politician (d. 1882)
  - Baron du Potet, French writer (d. 1881)
- April 13 – Cornelius Gilliam, American politician (d. 1848)
- April 14
  - William Clark Jr., American politician (d. 1871)
  - Frederick Spencer, 4th Earl Spencer, British Royal Navy admiral (d. 1857)
- April 15 – Jacques Bernard Hombron, French naval surgeon and naturalist (d. 1852)
- April 16
  - Fanny Gulick, American missionary (d. 1883)
  - Oswald Houston, American pioneer (d. 1861)
  - Georg Klindworth, Diplomat and intelligence agent (d. 1882)
- April 17
  - Étienne Bobillier, French mathematician (d. 1840)
  - Harriet Byron McAllister, American philanthropist (d. 1888)
- April 18 – Antonio Rolla, Italian musician (d. 1837)
- April 19
  - Darius Clark, musician (d. 1871)
  - Franz Joseph Glæser, Czech conductor and composer (d. 1861)
  - Heinrich Maria von Hess, German painter (d. 1863)
  - Andrea Maffei, Italian poet, translator and librettist (d. 1885)
- April 20
  - Frederick Crowder, English cricketer (d. 1894)
  - Dermide Leclerc, French nobility (d. 1804)
  - William Edmond Logan, British-Canadian geologist (d. 1875)
  - Chauncy Hare Townshend, English poet (d. 1868)
- April 22
  - Date Nariyoshi, Daimyo (d. 1828)
  - Adolf von Rauch, German paper manufacturer (d. 1882)
- April 23
  - Édouard Alletz, French diplomat (d. 1850)
  - Richard M. Blatchford, banking and trust lawyer, politician (d. 1875)
- April 24
  - Paul Duport, French playwright (d. 1866)
  - William Edward Petty Hartnell, California pioneer (d. 1854)
- April 26
  - Charles-François Baillargeon, Catholic archbishop (d. 1870)
  - Eugène Delacroix, French painter (d. 1863)
- April 27
  - Claire Clairmont, British writer, mother of Lord Byron's daughter (d. 1879)
  - Peder Christian Holst, Norwegian politician (d. 1873)
  - Pieter Barbiers IV, Dutch painter (d. 1848)
  - Lars Bastian Ridder Stabell, Norwegian politician (d. 1860)
  - François Thomas Tréhouart, French admiral (d. 1873)
- April 28
  - Duncan Forbes, Scottish linguist (d. 1868)
  - William Russell, educator and elocutionist (d. 1873)
- April 29 – Carlo Yvon, Italian oboist and composer (d. 1854)
- April 30
  - Albert, Prince of Schwarzburg-Rudolstadt (d. 1869)
  - Charles-Auguste van den Berghe, painter from France (d. 1853)

=== May ===
- May 1
  - Edward Joshua Cooper, Landowner, politician and astronomer (d. 1863)
  - William Ewart, British politician 1798–1869 (d. 1869)
  - Prince Clemens of Saxony, prince of Saxony (d. 1822)
  - Henri de Tully, French playwright, writer and librettist (d. 1846)
- May 2
  - William Mercer Green, American bishop, first Bishop of Mississippi (d. 1887)
  - Atanasio de Urioste, Bolivian merchant and magnate (d. 1864)
  - Claude Verpilleux, French engineer (d. 1875)
- May 3
  - Thomas Dickens Arnold, American politician (d. 1870)
  - Célestin Guynemer de la Hailandière, French-born bishop in the US (d. 1882)
  - Frederik van Rappard, Dutch politician (d. 1862)
  - Rufus P. Spalding, American politician (d. 1886)
- May 4 – Charles Kanaʻina, Hawaiian noble, father of King Lunalilo (d. 1877)
- May 5 – Jonathan Edwards Ryland, British writer (d. 1866)
- May 6
  - Louis La Caze, French physician and art collector (d. 1869)
  - Adolphus Goldsmith, Australian politician (d. 1876)
  - Eyre Massey, 3rd Baron Clarina, Anglo-Irish peer (d. 1872)
  - Joseph Welland, architect (d. 1860)
  - Aleksander Zawadzki, naturalist (d. 1868)
- May 7 – Emil Wilhelm Krummacher, German clergyman (d. 1886)
- May 8
  - Sir William Hanham, 8th Baronet, British Royal Navy officer (d. 1877)
  - Joanna Belfrage Picken, Scottish poet and teacher (d. 1859)
- May 10
  - Patrick Gaines Goode, American politician (d. 1862)
  - Christodoulos Hatzipetros, Greek military leader (d. 1869)
  - John Forbes Royle, British botanist (d. 1858)
  - Asher Tyler, American politician (d. 1875)
- May 11 – Trinidad Guevara, Uruguayan actor (d. 1873)
- May 12
  - John Kearsley Mitchell, American writer and physician (d. 1858)
  - Alphonse Périn, French painter (d. 1874)
- May 13
  - John Broadwood, English folk song collector (d. 1864)
  - John Payne Elwes, British politician (d. 1849)
- May 14 – Julius Christopher Hammer, Norwegian politician (d. 1877)
- May 15
  - Delino Dexter Calvin, Canadian politician (d. 1884)
  - Ivan Pushchin, Russian writer and judge (d. 1859)
- May 16 – Ellis Lewis, American judge (d. 1871)
- May 17 – George Don, Scottish botanist (d. 1856)
- May 18
  - Ethan A. Hitchcock, Union Army general (d. 1870)
  - James Lowe, English inventor of a screw propeller (d. 1866)
  - Firmin Marbeau, French philanthropist (d. 1875)
  - Anthelme Trimolet, French painter (d. 1866)
- May 19 – Dudley Ryder, 2nd Earl of Harrowby, British politician (d. 1882)
- May 20
  - Jean-Baptiste Chollet, French singer (d. 1892)
  - Theodor Amadeus Müller, German musician (d. 1846)
- May 21
  - Prosper Barbot, French painter (d. 1878)
  - Francis D'Arcy-Osborne, 7th Duke of Leeds, British politician (d. 1859)
  - Moses H. Kirby, American politician in Ohio (d. 1889)
  - Rufus Parks, American politician (d. 1878)
- May 22
  - Thomas Crook, American politician (d. 1879)
  - Alexander McDonnell, Irish chess master (d. 1835)
- May 24 – Walker King, priest (d. 1859)
- May 25 – Antoine-Olivier Berthelet, businessman, philanthropist, politician in Lower Canada (d. 1872)
- May 27
  - Édouard Monnais, French journalist, theater director, playwright, librettist (d. 1868)
  - John Walbanke-Childers, politician (d. 1886)
- May 28
  - Roland Bauchery, French playwright and chansonnier (d. 1863)
  - John Campbell, Scottish advocate and politician (d. 1830)
  - Josef Dessauer, Czech composer (d. 1876)
  - Edward Hughes Ball Hughes, English dandy (d. 1863)
  - Alexander Workman, Canadian politician (d. 1891)
- May 29
  - Walter Forbes, 18th Lord Forbes, British noble (d. 1868)
  - Edward Nevil Macready, British Army officer (d. 1848)
- May 31 – Robert Nugent Dunbar, British poet (d. 1866)

=== June ===
- June 1 – John Hollins, British artist (d. 1855)
- June 2
  - William Branwhite Clarke, British geologist, clergyman (d. 1878)
  - Nakayama Miki, founder of Tenrikyo (d. 1887)
  - Heinrich Gustav Mühlenbeck, Alsatian bryologist (d. 1845)
- June 3 – William Soden Hastings, American politician (d. 1842)
- June 4
  - Filippo Bigioli, Italian painter (d. 1878)
  - William Henry Chase, Florida militia colonel (d. 1870)
  - Alexander Gorchakov, Russian diplomat, minister, chancellor (d. 1883)
  - Niels Laurits Høyen, Danish art historian and critic (d. 1870)
- June 5 – Alexei Lvov, Russian composer (d. 1870)
- June 6 – James White McClung, American lawyer and politician (d. 1848)
- June 7
  - Barnabas Kelet Henagan, Governor of South Carolina (d. 1855)
  - John D. McCarty, Episcopal Missionary Priest (d. 1881)
- June 8
  - Johann Friedrich Riedel, German missionary (d. 1860)
- June 9
  - Eber D. Howe, American newspaper founder (d. 1884)
  - Adrien Recurt, French politician (d. 1872)
  - Eugène Joseph Verboeckhoven, Belgian romantic painter (d. 1881)
- June 10
  - Francis L. Hawks, American politician (d. 1866)
  - Frederick Richard Lee, British artist (d. 1879)
- June 12
  - William Abbot, English actor (d. 1843)
  - Samuel Cooper, Adjutant and Inspector General of the armies of the Confederate States (d. 1876)
- June 13
  - Johann Christian Felix Baehr, German classical philologist and librarian (d. 1872)
  - John Edgar, Irish activist (d. 1866)
  - David Hodgson, English painter (d. 1864)
- June 14 – František Palacký, Czech philosopher, historian, publicist and writer (d. 1876)
- June 16
  - Nabeshima Naotomo, daimyo (d. 1864)
  - Johan Henrik Thomander, Swedish translator, priest and theologian (d. 1865)
- June 18
  - McDonald Clarke, American writer (d. 1842)
  - Mary Martha Pearson, English portrait painter (d. 1871)
- June 19
  - Jan Valerián Jirsík, Czech member of Czech council (d. 1883)
  - Aimé Paris, French music educator, inventor of writing system (d. 1866)
  - Ammi B. Young, American architect (d. 1874)
- June 20
  - John Griesbach, English musician and composer (d. 1875)
  - Daniel McCook, Union Army officer (d. 1863)
- June 21
  - Walter Hilliard Bidwell, American Congregationalist minister, magazine editor (d. 1881)
  - Eduard Daniel Leopold van Ingen, Dutch colonial administrator on the Gold Coast (d. 1833)
  - Anthony Raymond, American architect (d. 1879)
- June 22 – Ditlev Blunck, Danish artist (d. 1853)
- June 23 – Thomas Church, colonial Administrator (d. 1860)
- June 24
  - Harriet Bradford Tiffany Stewart, missionary, writer (d. 1830)
  - Edward Turner, British chemist (d. 1837)
- June 25
  - Alexander Baxter, barrister (d. 1836)
  - Sophia Dallas, wife of US vice president George Mifflin Dallas (d. 1869)
- June 26
  - Wolfgang Menzel, German poet (d. 1873)
  - Josiah Warren, American social reformer, philosopher, inventor, musician, author (d. 1874)
- June 29
  - Willibald Alexis, German historical novelist (d. 1871)
  - Giacomo Leopardi, Italian poet, philosopher and writer (d. 1837)
- June 30
  - Alexander Dyce, Scottish literary editor and historian (d. 1869)
  - Ernst March, German manufacturer (d. 1847)

=== July ===
- July 1
  - Daniel Avery, American Mormon leader (d. 1851)
  - Shah Fazle Rasool Badayuni, former Grand Mufti of India (d. 1872)
  - Edward Curr, English-born pastoralist and politician in Australia (d. 1850)
  - Thomas Nicoll, British cricketer (d. 1883)
- July 2
  - Angelina Eberly, Texan hero (d. 1860)
  - John Forman, Canadian politician (d. 1832)
  - Frederick Polhill, politician (d. 1848)
- July 4 – Ely Moore, American congressman for New York (d. 1860)
- July 5
  - John G. Chapman, American politician (d. 1856)
  - John Gardiner, Australian settler (d. 1878)
  - Hannah Mary Rathbone, novelist and poet (d. 1878)
  - Alphonse Salin, French playwright (d. 1878)
- July 6 – Joseph Bowles, British cricketer (d. 1879)
- July 7
  - John Southerden Burn, English solicitor and antiquary (d. 1870)
  - Robert Gilfillan, British poet and songwriter (d. 1850)
- July 8
  - Abner M. Bradbury, American politician (d. 1885)
  - William Brodrick, 7th Viscount Midleton, Irish Visount (d. 1870)
  - Henry Dundas Campbell, British Governor of Sierra Leone (d. 1872)
  - Ralph Ingersoll Lockwood, American novelist (d. 1858)
  - Thomas Burr Osborne, American politician (d. 1869)
  - Carl Heinrich "Schultzenstein" Schultz, German botanist (d. 1871)
- July 9
  - John Bancker Aycrigg, Member of the US House of Representatives (d. 1856)
  - Gustav Adolf Michaelis, German obstetrician (d. 1848)
- July 10
  - Rudolph Friedrich Hohenacker, Swiss-German missionary, botanist (d. 1874)
  - John Jones, Ojibwa priest (d. 1847)
  - Henry G. Lamar, American politician (d. 1861)
  - X. B. Saintine, French dramatist and novelist (d. 1865)
- July 11 – Paolo Savi, Italian geologist and ornithologist (d. 1871)
- July 12
  - Cyrus Bryant, American educator (d. 1865)
  - William L. Sharkey, American politician (d. 1873)
- July 13
  - Warder Cresson, American diplomat (d. 1860)
  - Alexandra Feodorovna, wife of Nicholas I of Russia (d. 1860)
- July 14
  - Alessandro Antonelli, Italian architect (d. 1888)
  - François Mêlier, academic, member of the Accademia delle Scienze di Torino (d. 1866)
- July 15
  - Alexander Gorchakov, Russian politician (d. 1883)
  - James Kennedy, British politician, barrister, judge, writer (d. 1859)
  - Thomas Stinson, Canadian businessman (d. 1864)
- July 16
  - Georges Oberhaeuser, German physicist (d. 1868)
  - Eduard Friedrich Poeppig, German naturalist (d. 1868)
  - Abbondio Sangiorgio, Italian sculptor (d. 1879)
- July 17 – Aslak Reiersson Midhassel, Norwegian politician (d. 1882)
- July 19
  - Guillaume Louis DeBuys, American politician (d. 1856)
  - Christian August II, Duke of Schleswig-Holstein-Sonderburg-Augustenburg (d. 1869)
  - René de Thorigny, French lawyer and politician (d. 1869)
- July 20 – Andrew Cowie, Canadian politician (d. 1890)
- July 21 – William Wilberforce, English politician (d. 1879)
- July 22
  - Côme-Séraphin Cherrier, Canadian politician (d. 1885)
  - Josef Anton Henne, Swiss historian (d. 1870)
  - Léon Rousseau, Canadian politician (d. 1869)
  - Gabriele Smargiassi, Italian painter (d. 1882)
- July 23
  - James Hyslop, Scottish poet (d. 1827)
  - Jane Herbert Wilkinson Long, "Mother of Texas" (d. 1880)
- July 24
  - Antonio Bresciani, Italian writer (d. 1862)
  - John Adams Dix, Union Army General (d. 1879)
  - James Gallier, Irish-American architect (d. 1866)
  - Mark Napier, Scottish lawyer, biographer and historical author (d. 1879)
- July 25 – Albert Knapp, German poet (d. 1864)
- July 26
  - John Campbell-Wyndham, politician (d. 1869)
  - George W. Lay, American politician (d. 1860)
- July 28
  - William Hope-Johnstone, British Royal Navy admiral (d. 1878)
  - Asahel Huntington, American politician (d. 1870)
  - Hezekiah Williams, American politician (d. 1856)
- July 29
  - Carl Blechen, German painter (d. 1840)
  - Thomas Clap Perkins, American lawyer and politician (d. 1870)
- July 30 – Thomas Chilton, American politician (d. 1854)

=== August ===
- August 2
  - Gabrio Casati, Italian politician (d. 1873)
  - Luis Fernández de Córdova, Spanish general and diplomat (d. 1840)
- August 3
  - Wilhelm Ludwig Deichmann, German banker (d. 1876)
  - Prosper Duvergier de Hauranne, French journalist and politician (d. 1881)
  - Llewelyn Lewellin, British priest (d. 1878)
  - Walker Lewis, African American abolitionist, Freemason, Mormon elder (d. 1856)
- August 4
  - John Gregg, Church of Ireland bishop of Cork (d. 1878)
  - Louis Schwabe, manufacturer of silk and artificial silk fabrics in Manchester (d. 1845)
  - Matsudaira Yorihiro, Japanese daimyo, 9th lord of Takamatsu (d. 1842)
- August 5
  - Salvador María del Carril, Argentine politician (d. 1883)
  - Benjamin Thompson, US Representative from Massachusetts (d. 1852)
  - John Wrottesley, 2nd Baron Wrottesley, British astronomer (d. 1867)
- August 6
  - William Alcott, American physician and author (d. 1859)
  - Anton Delvig, Russian journalist and poet (d. 1831)
  - Pavel Nikolaievich Demidov, Russian nobleman (d. 1840)
  - Pierre Letuaire, French painter (d. 1885)
- August 8
  - Nathan Goodell, American mayor (d. 1883)
  - John Johnson Jr., Chancellor of Maryland (d. 1856)
- August 9
  - Louis-Florentin Calmeil, French psychiatrist (d. 1895)
  - Justus Friedrich Kritz, German classical philologist and high school teacher (d. 1869)
- August 10 – George Vivian, English painter and draughtsman (d. 1873)
- August 11
  - John Marshall Clemens, father of Mark Twain (d. 1847)
  - Dominick Daly, Governor of Prince Edward Island & South Australia (d. 1868)
- August 12 – Abraham Rencher, American politician (d. 1883)
- August 15
  - Charles H. Bell, United States admiral (d. 1875)
  - Henry Labouchere, 1st Baron Taunton, English politician (d. 1869)
  - Joaquín María López y López, Spanish politician, writer, journalist (d. 1855)
- August 16
  - Mirabeau B. Lamar, American politician and poet (d. 1859)
  - Alfred Ollivant, British bishop (d. 1882)
- August 17
  - Lydia Neal Dennett, abolitionist and suffragist from Portland (d. 1881)
  - Thomas Hodgkin, British physician, pathologist (d. 1866)
  - Richard Laming, British chemist (d. 1879)
- August 19
  - Charles Beck, German-born American classical scholar (d. 1866)
  - Asa Lansford Foster, Pennsylvanian geologist, merchant, coal mine owner (d. 1868)
  - Bryan Owsley, American politician (d. 1849)
  - James Shipton, British politician, Merchant (d. 1865)
- August 20 – Jacques Leroy de Saint-Arnaud, French general, Marshal of France, Minister of War (d. 1854)
- August 21
  - François-Antoine Bossuet, Belgian artist (d. 1889)
  - Jules Michelet, French historian, popularized the concept of the Renaissance (d. 1874)
- August 22
  - Richard Robert Madden, Irish doctor, writer, abolitionist and historian (d. 1886)
  - John Peel, British priest (d. 1875)
  - Ignatius A. Reynolds, Catholic bishop (d. 1855)
  - William Gottlieb Schauffler, German missionary (d. 1883)
- August 23
  - Antonio Novasconi, Catholic bishop (d. 1867)
  - William Patton, American pastor and abolitionist (d. 1879)
- August 24 – José María Imbert, Dominican politician (d. 1847)
- August 25 – Joseph von Auffenberg, German dramatist (d. 1857)
- August 26 – John McClintock, 1st Baron Rathdonnell, British politician (d. 1879)
- August 27
  - Ernst Heinrich Kneschke, German writer (d. 1869)
  - Charles Clay Trabue, American banker and Whig politician (d. 1851)
- August 28
  - Gershom Jacques Van Brunt, US Naval Officer during the American Civil War (d. 1818)
  - Harro Harring, German-Danish revolutionary and writer (d. 1870)
  - John W. A. Sanford, American politician and farmer (d. 1870)
- August 29
  - Edward Eliot, 3rd Earl of St Germans, British politician and diplomat (d. 1877)
  - Sardar Singh of Udaipur, Maharaja of Udaipur (d. 1842)
- August 30
  - Archduchess Maria Luisa of Austria, Austro-Tuscan nobility (d. 1857)
  - Virginie Déjazet, French actress (d. 1875)
- August 31
  - William C. Crain, American politician (d. 1865)
  - Johann Mannhardt, German clockmaker (d. 1878)
  - Michael Neher, German artist (d. 1876)
  - Georg Friedrich Puchta, German jurist (d. 1846)
  - Peter Grayson Washington, American Assistant Secretary of the Treasury (d. 1872)

=== September ===
- September 1
  - Richard Delafield, Union Army general (d. 1873)
  - Jean-Augustin Franquelin, French painter (d. 1839)
  - John Horatio Lloyd, English barrister and politician (d. 1884)
  - John A. Quitman, American politician (d. 1858)
- September 2
  - Friedrich Wilhelm Heidenreich, German physician (d. 1857)
  - Thomas Holliday Hicks, American politician (d. 1865)
  - James Scott Howard, first postmaster in Toronto (d. 1866)
- September 3
  - Hartman Bache, American engineer (d. 1872)
  - August Kavel, Australian settler (d. 1860)
- September 4
  - Albert Clinton Horton, American politician (d. 1865)
  - Raynold Kaufgetz, Swiss academic (d. 1869)
  - Francis Julius LeMoyne, American physician (d. 1879)
  - Costantino Patrizi Naro, Catholic cardinal (d. 1876)
- September 5
  - Christian Peder Bianco Boeck, Norwegian medical doctor, zoologist, mountain climber (d. 1877)
  - William Thomas Buckland, British auctioneer (d. 1870)
  - Sophie Esterházy, Austrian courtier (d. 1869)
  - Kujō Hisatada, kuge (d. 1871)
- September 6 – Nathalie Elma d'Esménard, French artist and botanical illustrator (d. 1872)
- September 7 – Karl Schnaase, German art historian (d. 1875)
- September 8
  - George Edmondson, British educator (d. 1863)
  - James D. Green, American politician (d. 1882)
  - Perley B. Johnson, American politician (d. 1870)
  - Robert Hall Morrison, American academic (d. 1889)
- September 9
  - Zechariah Buck, British musician (d. 1879)
  - Joseph Anselm Feuerbach, German archaeologist (d. 1851)
  - Samuel Friedrich Hassel, German actor and singer (d. 1876)
  - Cosmo Innes, British academic (d. 1874)
  - John Pennefather, British Army general (d. 1872)
- September 10 – Adam Johan Frederik Poulsen Trampe, Norwegian jurist (d. 1876)
- September 11
  - Paschal Dumais, Canadian politician (d. 1873)
  - Sarah D. Fish, American suffragist, abolitionist (d. 1868)
  - Franz Ernst Neumann, German mineralogist, physicist, mathematician (d. 1895)
- September 12 – Janez Vesel, Slovenian writer and lawyer (d. 1884)
- September 13 – Robert Hodgson, Canadian lawyer, politician, judge (d. 1880)
- September 14
  - Alexandre Barbié du Bocage, French geographer (d. 1834)
  - Charlotte-Adélaïde Dard, French author (d. 1862)
  - Andreas Nicolai Hansen, Danish merchant (d. 1873)
  - Henry Melvill, British Anglican priest (d. 1871)
- September 16
  - William Goode, American politician and lawyer (d. 1859)
  - Robert Schuyler, American railroad magnate (d. 1855)
- September 18
  - Rufus Babcock, American college president (d. 1875)
  - Edvard Bergenheim, Finnish archbishop (d. 1884)
  - Seymour Brunson, American Mormon leader (d. 1840)
- September 19 – Caesar Hawkins, British surgeon (d. 1884)
- September 20
  - Samuel Henry Dickson, American poet, physician, writer, educator (d. 1872)
  - Micajah W. Kirby, American politician (d. 1882)
  - Philipp Schey von Koromla, Austro-Hungarian merchant & philanthropist (d. 1881)
- September 22
  - Antonio Paulino Limpo de Abreu, Viscount of Abaeté, Brazilian politician & judge (d. 1883)
  - Cornelius P. Lott, American Mormon leader (d. 1850)
  - Joseph C. Noyes, American politician (d. 1868)
  - Marshall Pinckney Wilder, American politician (d. 1886)
- September 23
  - John Collicott, Australian settler and auctioneer (d. 1840)
  - Henry Riddell, Scottish poet and songwriter (d. 1870)
- September 24 – Takashima Shūhan, samurai and military engineer (d. 1866)
- September 25
  - Jean-Baptiste Élie de Beaumont, French geologist (d. 1874)
  - Louis Alphonse de Brébisson, French photographer and botanist (d. 1872)
  - Hendrik Scheffer, Dutch painter (d. 1862)
- September 26
  - Tomás Cipriano de Mosquera, Colombian general and political figure (d. 1878)
  - Heinrich Wilhelm von Pabst, German agronomist and secretary (d. 1868)
  - Etelka Szapáry, Hungarian noblewoman (d. 1876)
  - Mira Sharpless Townsend, Quaker activist and reformer (d. 1859)
- September 27
  - William Blades, American politician and preacher (d. 1877)
  - Jonathan Edwards, American lawyer and politician from New York (d. 1875)
- September 28
  - Bonaventura Genelli, German artist (d. 1868)
  - Charles-Philippe Larivière, French painter (d. 1876)
  - Johann Friedrich Laurer, German botanist, anatomist, pharmacologist (d. 1873)
  - Johann Heinrich Schilbach, German painter (d. 1851)
  - James G. Taliaferro, American judge (d. 1876)
- September 29
  - Dwight Baldwin, American Christian missionary on Maui during the Kingdom of Hawaii (d. 1886)
  - Edwyn Burnaby, English landowner (d. 1867)
  - Toma Jederlinić, Croatian prelate, Catholic bishop of Dubrovnik, apostolic administrator of Trebinje-Mrkan (d. 1855)
  - Michele Viale-Prelà, aristocratic Catholic priest from Corsica, France (d. 1860)
  - Charles Henry Warren, American politician (d. 1874)
- September 30 – John Wilkinson, lawyer and Postmaster (d. 1862)

=== October ===
- October 1 – James Wentworth Buller, British politician (d. 1865)
- October 2
  - Michael James Robert Dillon, 12th Earl of Roscommon, Irish Earl (d. 1850)
  - Théodore Guérin, Catholic saint and nun from France (d. 1856)
  - Gazaway Bugg Lamar, steamboat pioneer, banker, Confederate supporter (d. 1874)
  - King Charles Albert of Sardinia, King of Sardinia (d. 1849)
  - James Beaty Sr., Canadian politician (d. 1892)
  - Emmanuel Vincent, English cricketer (d. 1860)
- October 3
  - John Parker, English cleric and architect (d. 1860)
  - Morris Jacob Raphall, British-born American rabbi (d. 1868)
  - Louis Vasquez, Spanish mountain man (d. 1868)
- October 4
  - Lewis Caleb Beck, United States naturalist (d. 1853)
  - Phineas W. Leland, American politician (d. 1870)
  - Ange Paulin Terver, French malacologist (d. 1875)
  - Constantin Wesmael, Belgian entomologist (d. 1872)
- October 5
  - Michael Zittle Jr., novelist (d. 1877)
  - Joseph Power, librarian of the University of Cambridge (d. 1868)
- October 6
  - Robert Baird, American clergyman and writer (d. 1863)
  - Charles B. Penrose, American politician (d. 1857)
- October 7
  - William Robertson, Australian pastoralist (d. 1874)
  - Jean-Baptiste Vuillaume, French luthier (d. 1875)
- October 8
  - John Byington, American Seventh-day Adventist minister (d. 1887)
  - Philarète Chasles, French critic and man of letters (d. 1873)
  - Hans Holmboe, Norwegian educator and politician (d. 1868)
  - Felix Neff, Swiss minister (d. 1829)
- October 9
  - Samuel Dana Bell, American judge (d. 1868)
  - Isaac Ferris, American University president (d. 1873)
  - William Thorold, British businessman (d. 1878)
- October 10 – Bateman Paul, Church of England clergyman and writer (d. 1877)
- October 11
  - Ida Arenhold, German social reformer (d. 1863)
  - John Duncan Bligh, British diplomat (d. 1872)
  - Samuel Gardner Drake, United States historian and antiquarian (d. 1875)
  - Bache McEvers, American commission merchant, shipper and insurer (d. 1851)
  - Thomas Overskou, Theatre historian, playwright, actor (d. 1873)
  - Ole Ingebrigtsen Soelberg, Norwegian politician (d. 1874)
- October 12
  - Pedro I of Brazil, Emperor of Brazil, and King of Portugal (d. 1834)
  - Jesse Olney, American geographer (d. 1872)
- October 13
  - Herman Wilhelm Bissen, Danish sculptor (d. 1868)
  - Jean Henri De Coene, Belgian painter (d. 1866)
  - Solomon Quetsch, Austrian rabbi (d. 1856)
  - Robert Crichton Wyllie, Scottish-born Hawaiian politician (d. 1865)
- October 14
  - Jean-Charles-Alphonse Avinain, French serial killer (d. 1867)
  - Łukasz Baraniecki, Catholic archbishop of Lviv (d. 1858)
  - Mayhew Beckwith, Canadian politician (d. 1871)
  - Sir Charles Maclean, 9th Baronet, 25th Chief of Clan Maclean (d. 1883)
- October 15 – Patrick Raymond Griffith, Irish Dominican priest (d. 1862)
- October 16
  - Martiniano Chilavert, Argentine military officer (d. 1852)
  - John Carnac Morris, British lexicographer (d. 1858)
- October 17 – Peter Harvey, biographer (d. 1877)
- October 18 – Karl Ludwig von Bruck, Austrian politician (d. 1860)
- October 19
  - George Coles, English cricketer (d. 1865)
  - Charles A. Ingersoll, United States federal judge (d. 1860)
  - Robert Pollok, Scottish poet (d. 1827)
- October 20 – William A. Moseley, American politician (d. 1873)
- October 21
  - Karl Heinrich Baumgärtner, German physician (d. 1886)
  - Massimo d'Azeglio, Italian statesman, novelist and painter (d. 1866)
- October 22
  - Lovisa Charlotta Borgman, Swedish musician (d. 1884)
  - Mariano Eduardo de Rivero y Ustáriz, Peruvian geologist, mineralogist, chemist, archaeologist, politician (d. 1857)
- October 25
  - Henry Nelson Coleridge, British writer (d. 1843)
  - James Everard Home, British Royal Navy officer (d. 1853)
  - Ernst Hermann Joseph Münch, German librarian and historian (d. 1841)
- October 26 – Beda Weber, Austrian writer (d. 1858)
- October 27
  - John Meeson Parsons, British art collector (d. 1870)
  - Gustav Parthey, German classical philologist, art historian (d. 1872)
  - Heinrich Scherk, German mathematician (d. 1885)
- October 28
  - Henri Bertini, French composer (d. 1876)
  - Clément-Charles Sabrevois de Bleury, Canadian politician (d. 1862)
  - Levi Coffin, American educator and abolitionist (d. 1877)
  - Hippolyte François Jaubert, French botanist and politician (d. 1874)
- October 29 – William Lascelles, British politician (d. 1851)
- October 30 – Maurice Schlesinger, German music publisher (d. 1871)
- October 31
  - Antonio Cabral Bejarano, Spanish painter (d. 1861)
  - William Stuart, British politician (d. 1874)

=== November ===
- November 1
  - Henry Dupont, French entomologist, natural history specimen trader (d. 1873)
  - Benjamin Guinness, British politician (d. 1868)
  - James Morris, Canadian politician (d. 1865)
  - Armand Joseph Overnay, French playwright (d. 1853)
- November 2 – Jules Coignet, French painter (d. 1860)
- November 3
  - James M. Mason, American politician (d. 1871)
  - Henry Wilder, English cricketer (d. 1836)
- November 4
  - Buenaventura Carlos Aribau, Spanish writer, politician, economist (d. 1862)
  - John Heritage Bryan, American politician (d. 1870)
  - John Dilloway, English cricketer (d. 1869)
  - Karl Kreil, Austrian meteorologist and astronomer (d. 1862)
  - John Laporte, American politician (d. 1862)
  - Henriette Méric-Lalande, singer (d. 1867)
- November 5
  - William Gamble, English cricketer (d. 1855)
  - Charles Gibbs, American pirate (d. 1831)
  - Pascoe St Leger Grenfell, British copper smelter (d. 1879)
  - Marie-Caroline of Bourbon-Two Sicilies, Duchess of Berry, Italian princess (d. 1870)
- November 6
  - Iulian Liublinskii, Slav nationalist and Decembrist (d. 1873)
  - George Agnew Reay, British organist (d. 1879)
- November 7
  - Silas H. Stringham, American Navy admiral (d. 1876)
  - Lord John Thynne, English aristocrat, Deputy Dean of Westminster (d. 1881)
- November 8
  - John Janney, American politician (d. 1872)
  - Samuel Morgan, American businessman (d. 1880)
- November 9
  - Arthur Hill-Trevor, 3rd Viscount Dungannon, English Conservative Party politician (d. 1862)
  - William Russell, British Whig politician (d. 1850)
- November 10
  - Charles Philip Brown, British official of the East India Company (d. 1884)
  - Eliza, Lady Darling, wife of Major-General Ralph Darling and artist (d. 1868)
- November 11
  - Ivane Andronikashvili, Georgian noble, general in the Imperial Russian service (d. 1868)
  - Edward Cross, American politician (d. 1887)
  - John Amory Lowell, American businessman & anthropologist (d. 1881)
  - Montagu Stopford, British Royal Navy admiral (d. 1864)
- November 13 – Anne Nasmyth, Scottish artist (d. 1874)
- November 14
  - Alexandre Louis Lefèbvre de Cérisy, French entomologist (d. 1867)
  - Peder Carl Lasson, Norwegian politician (d. 1873)
- November 15
  - Thomas Barker, English county cricketer (d. 1877)
  - Rice Richard Clayton, politician (d. 1879)
  - Abel Hugo, Writer (one of Victor Hugo's brothers) (d. 1855)
  - William Mattice, Canadian politician (d. 1881)
  - Gabriel Monsen, Norwegian politician (d. 1882)
- November 16
  - Jacques Antoine Bonebakker, Dutch jeweller, goldsmith, silversmith (d. 1868)
  - Joseph Chinn, American politician (d. 1840)
  - Marie-Joseph Farcot, French engineer (d. 1875)
  - Therese Grob, Austrian singer (d. 1875)
  - Persifor Frazer Smith, American politician (d. 1858)
- November 18 – Eugène Renduel, French publisher (d. 1874)
- November 19 – José María Alviso, American mayor (d. 1853)
- November 20 – Johann Georg August Wirth, German journalist and author (d. 1848)
- November 21
  - Jérôme-Adolphe Blanqui, French economist (d. 1854)
  - Léon Lacabane, French historian, librarian, palaeographer (d. 1884)
  - Ferdinand Langlé, French playwright (d. 1867)
  - John Clements Wickham, Explorer of Australia (d. 1864)
- November 22 – Angeliki Palli, Italian poet, translator, editor (d. 1875)
- November 23
  - Hannah Simpson Grant, mother of Ulysses S. Grant (d. 1883)
  - Klementyna Hoffmanowa, Polish writer, translator, editor, writer for children (d. 1845)
  - Franz Horny, German painter (d. 1824)
  - Alonzo Morphy, American judge (d. 1856)
  - Francis Ruddle, British carpenter (d. 1882)
- November 26
  - Count Ludwig Joseph von Boos-Waldeck, German nobleman, promoted emigration to Texas (d. 1880)
  - John Strong Sr., American politician (d. 1881)
- November 27
  - Étienne-Ossian Henry, French chemist (d. 1873)
  - Andries Pretorius, South African politician (d. 1853)
  - Friedrich Ludwig von Rönne, German diplomat (d. 1865)
  - Menucha Rochel Slonim, matriarch of the Hebron community (d. 1888)
  - Rafael Tegeo, Spanish painter (d. 1856)
- November 28 – Cora Millet-Robinet, French writer (d. 1890)
- November 29
  - Alexander Brullov, Russian artist (d. 1877)
  - Hamilton Rowan Gamble, American jurist and politician (d. 1864)
- November 30 – Friedrich Heinrich Ranke, German theologian (d. 1876)

=== December ===
- December 1
  - Albert Barnes, American theologian (d. 1870)
  - Frederic Carpenter Skey, English surgeon (d. 1872)
- December 2
  - Asa Child, American attorney (d. 1858)
  - António Luís de Seabra, 1st Viscount of Seabra, Portuguese judge, lawyer and politician (d. 1895)
- December 3
  - David L. Beatty, American politician (d. 1881)
  - Philippe-Frédéric Blandin, French surgeon (d. 1849)
  - William Henry Cogswell, American politician (d. 1876)
  - Gilbert Knapp, American politician (d. 1887)
  - Alfred Iverson Sr., American politician (d. 1873)
- December 4
  - Félix-Sébastien Feuillet de Conches, art collector (d. 1887)
  - Jules Armand Dufaure, thrice prime minister of France (d. 1881)
  - William Evans, English watercolor painter (d. 1877)
- December 5
  - Alexandre-Marie Colin, French painter (d. 1875)
  - Ferdinand Pettrich, German sculptor (d. 1872)
- December 6
  - James Hosken, English naval officer and mariner (d. 1885)
  - Niccolò Matas, Italian architect (d. 1872)
- December 8
  - Antoine Laurent Dantan, French sculptor (d. 1878)
  - Joseph Romain-Desfossés, French admiral (d. 1864)
  - Thomas T. Whittlesey, American politician (d. 1868)
- December 9
  - Friedrich Gottlieb Bartling, German botanist (d. 1875)
  - James Sevier Conway, 1st governor of Arkansas (d. 1855)
  - John Walsh, 1st Baron Ormathwaite, British politician (d. 1881)
- December 10
  - Andrew Buchanan, Scottish surgeon and professor of physiology (d. 1882)
  - George Fletcher Moore, politician, public servant, diarist (d. 1886)
- December 11
  - Thomas Aspinwall Davis, American mayor and silversmith (d. 1845)
  - Maria Hartmann, German-born Moravian missionary (d. 1853)
  - John S.C. Knowlton, American politician (d. 1871)
- December 12
  - Daniel S. Bacon, American politician and judge (d. 1866)
  - Friedrich August Grotefend, German classical philologist (d. 1836)
- December 13
  - Edward Thomas Bainbridge, United Kingdom Member of Parliament (d. 1872)
  - Otto Philipp Braun, Bolivian military leader (d. 1869)
  - James Henry, Irish poet (d. 1876)
  - Shadrack F. Slatter, American slave trader and capitalist (d. 1861)
  - Joseph R. Walker, American explorer (d. 1876)
- December 14 – Alexis Bailly, American politician and fur trader (d. 1861)
- December 15 – Edward Burleson, American politician (d. 1851)
- December 16
  - John Berdan, American politician (d. 1841)
  - Chester W. Chapin, American politician, railroad executive (d. 1883)
  - Joachim Pollak, Czech rabbi (d. 1879)
- December 17
  - Charles Broadbridge, English cricketer (d. 1841)
  - Julius Converse, American politician (d. 1885)
  - William Forster, British Army officer (d. 1879)
  - John Pope, United States Navy officer (d. 1876)
- December 18
  - Henry Black, Canadian lawyer, judge and politician (d. 1873)
  - Emil Normann, painter and naval officer (d. 1881)
  - Heinrich Smidt, German writer (d. 1867)
  - Christopher Harris Williams, American politician (d. 1857)
- December 19
  - Lady Mary Fox, noblewoman, British aristocrat and writer (d. 1864)
  - James Seaton Reid, Irish church historian (d. 1851)
- December 20
  - Laurens Perseus Hickok, American philosopher (d. 1888)
  - John Wood, Governor of Illinois (d. 1880)
- December 21 – Paul, French dancer (d. 1871)
- December 22
  - George W. Crawford, American politician (d. 1872)
  - José Antonio Vidaurre, Chilean Army officer (d. 1837)
- December 23
  - Arthur Ingram Aston, English diplomat (d. 1859)
  - James Carter, British engraver (d. 1855)
  - Alpheus Spring Packard Sr., American classical philologist (d. 1884)
- December 24
  - William Clarke, English cricketer (d. 1856)
  - Valerian Engelhardt, Russian lieutenant general (d. 1856)
  - Adam Mickiewicz, Polish writer (d. 1855)
  - John Stockton, American politician (d. 1878)
- December 25
  - Catherine Grace Godwin, Scottish novelist, amateur painter, poet (d. 1845)
  - Richard Green Parker, United States educator, textbook writer (d. 1869)
  - Noel Le Vasseur, Illinois fur trader (d. 1879)
  - Hugh White, American politician (d. 1870)
- December 26
  - Ferdinand Freiherr von Beschwitz, German noble (d. 1874)
  - Amariah Brigham, American psychiatrist (d. 1849)
  - Étienne Chartier, Canadian priest (d. 1853)
  - Joseph Wigram, Bishop of Rochester (d. 1867)
- December 27
  - Alexander Colquhoun-Stirling-Murray-Dunlop, church lawyer & politician (d. 1870)
  - William Wilson Corcoran, American banker (d. 1888)
  - Nikolay Protasov, Russian general (d. 1855)
- December 28
  - Heinrich Philipp August Damerow, German physician and psychiatrist (d. 1866)
  - John Ffolliott, Irish landowner and MP (d. 1868)
  - Thomas Henderson, Scottish lawyer, astronomer & mathematician (d. 1844)
  - John Ward, English painter (d. 1849)
- December 29
  - Algernon Greville, soldier and cricketer (d. 1864)
  - Barzillai Quaife, Australian minister and writer (d. 1873)
  - Nathaniel Treat, politician (d. 1894)
- December 30
  - Charles Clerke, English Anglican priest (d. 1877)
  - Johann Jakob Meyer, Swiss pharmacist (d. 1826)
- December 31 – Friedrich Robert Faehlmann, Estonian writer (d. 1850)
- Date unknown:
  - Mary Faber, West African slave trader and local potentate (d. after 1857)
  - Eduard von Feuchtersleben, Polish-born mining engineer and writer (d. 1857)

1799

=== January–June ===
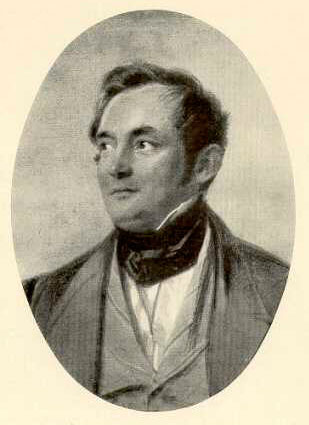
Carl Adolph von Basedow

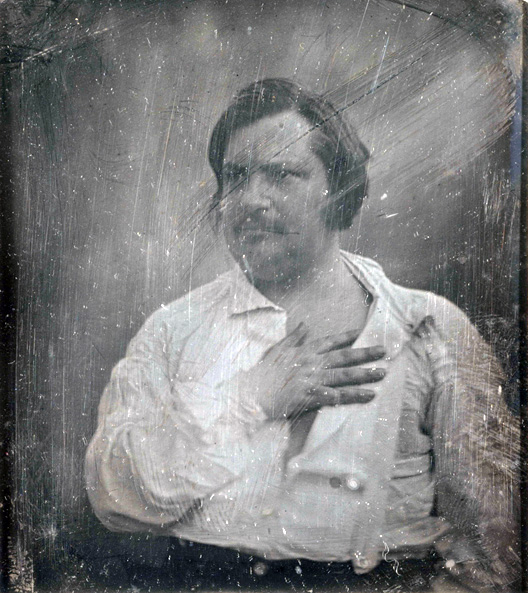
Honoré de Balzac

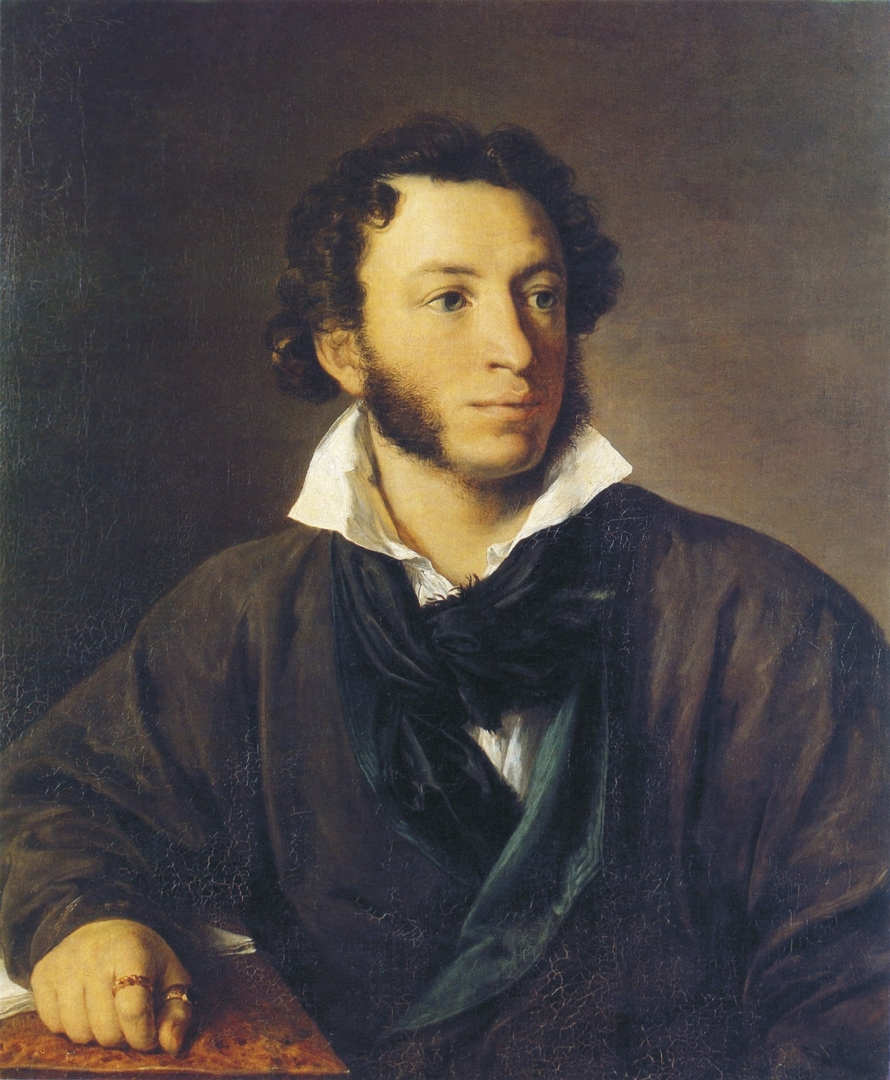
Alexander Pushkin

- January 6 – Jedediah Smith, American fur trapper, explorer (d. 1831)
- January 12 – Priscilla Susan Bury, British botanist (d. 1872)
- January 23 – Alois Negrelli, Tyrolean engineer, railroad pioneer active in the Austrian Empire (1858)
- January 31 – Rodolphe Töpffer, Swiss teacher, author and artist (d. 1846)
- February 4 – Almeida Garrett, Portuguese writer (d. 1854)
- February 11 – Basil Moreau, founder of the Congregation of Holy Cross (d. 1873)
- February 14 – Walenty Wańkowicz, Polish painter (d. 1842)
- February 17 – Carl Julian (von) Graba, German lawyer and ornithologist who visits the Faroe Islands (d. 1874)
- February 27 – Edward Belcher, British admiral (d. 1877)
- March 8 – Simon Cameron, American politician (d. 1889)
- March 16 – Anna Atkins, British botanist (d. 1871)
- March 22 – Friedrich Wilhelm Argelander, German astronomer (d. 1875)
- March 28 – Karl Adolph von Basedow, German physician, noted for reporting the symptoms of Graves–Basedow disease (d. 1854)
- March 29 – Edward Smith-Stanley, 14th Earl of Derby, Prime Minister of the United Kingdom (d. 1869)
- April 12 – Henri Druey, Swiss Federal Councilor (d. 1855)
- April 17 – Eliza Acton, English poet and cookery writer (d. 1859)
- May 9 – Philipp von Stadion und Thannhausen, Austrian field marshal (d. 1868)
- May 20 – Honoré de Balzac, French author (d. 1850)
- May 21 – Mary Anning, British paleontologist (d. 1847)
- May 25 – Alexei Lvov, Russian composer (d. 1870)
- June 3 – Elisabetta Fiorini Mazzanti, Italian botanist (d. 1879)
- June 6 – Alexander Pushkin, Russian author (d. 1837)
- June 18 – Prosper Ménière, French physician (d. 1862)
- June 25 – David Douglas, Scottish-born botanist (d. 1834)

=== July–December ===
- July 4 – King Oscar I of Sweden and Norway (d. 1859)
- July 6 – Michael Thomas Bass, English brewer (d. 1884)
- August 12
  - Francis Abbott, Australian astronomer (d. 1883)
  - Patrick MacDowell, Irish sculptor (d. 1870)
- August 20 – Heinrich von Gagern, German statesman and politician (d. 1880)
- September 1 – Ferenc Gyulay, Hungarian nobleman, general and governor (d. 1868)
- September 8 – James Bowman Lindsay, Scottish inventor (d. 1862)
- September 10 – George Willison Adams, American abolitionist (d. 1879)
- October 1 – John Brown Russwurm, Americo-Liberian journalist and governor of the African Republic of Maryland (d. 1851)
- October 18 – Christian Friedrich Schönbein, German chemist (d. 1868)
- October 26 – Margaret Agnes Bunn, British actress (d. 1883)
- November 1 – Thomas Baldwin Marsh, American religious leader (d. 1866)
- November 7 – James Syme, Scottish medical reformer (d. 1870)
- November 29 – Amos Bronson Alcott, American philosopher, educator and writer, father of novelist Louisa May Alcott (d. 1888)
- December 3 – Peggy Eaton, born Margaret O'Neill, wife of United States Secretary of State John Eaton and central character in the Petticoat affair (d. 1879)
- December 25 – Manuel Bulnes, Chilean general and politician, President of Chile (d. 1866)

=== Date unknown ===
- James Townsend Saward, English barrister, forger
- Domnița Rallou Caragea, Greek princess, independence activist (d. 1870)

== Deaths ==
1790

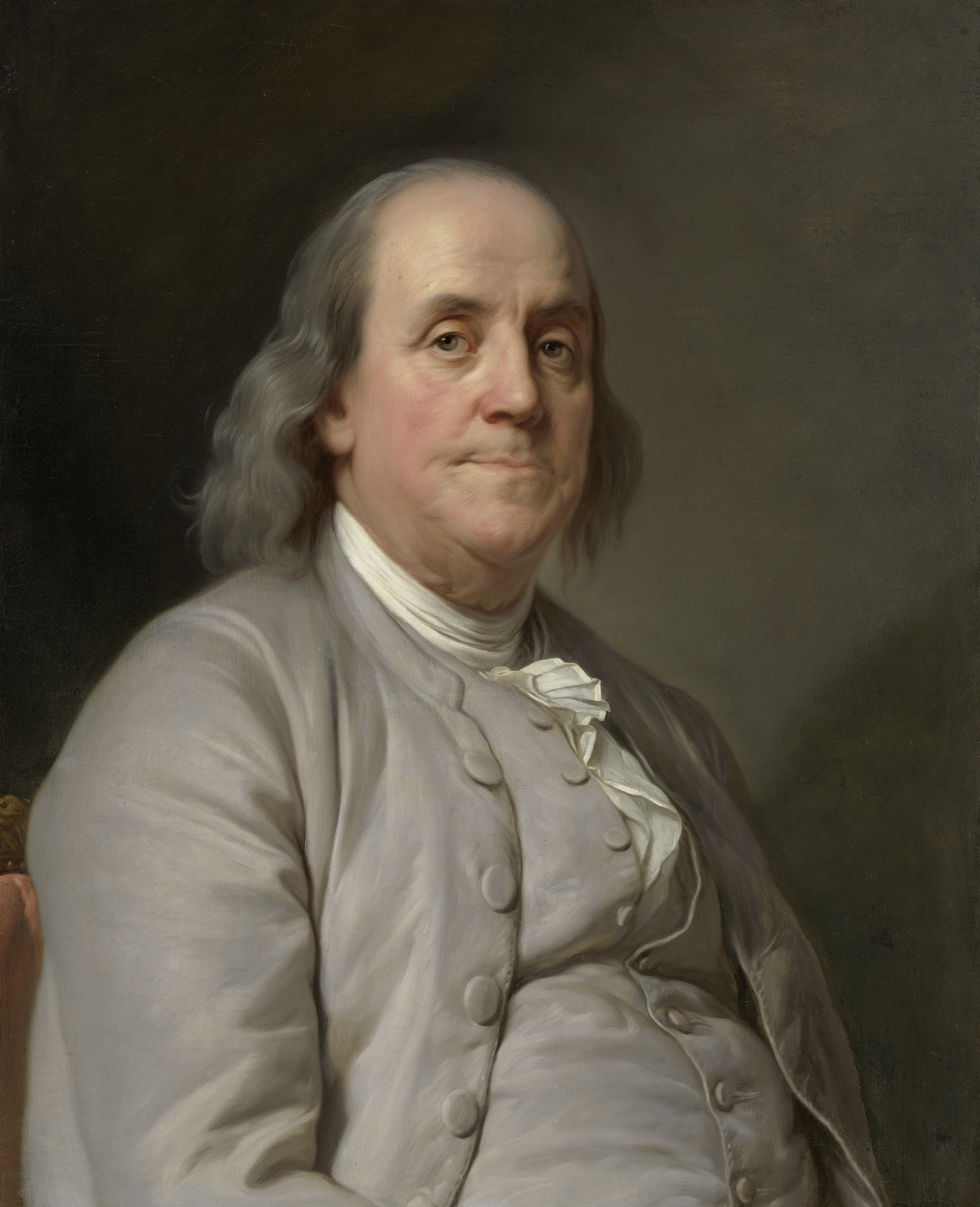
Benjamin Franklin

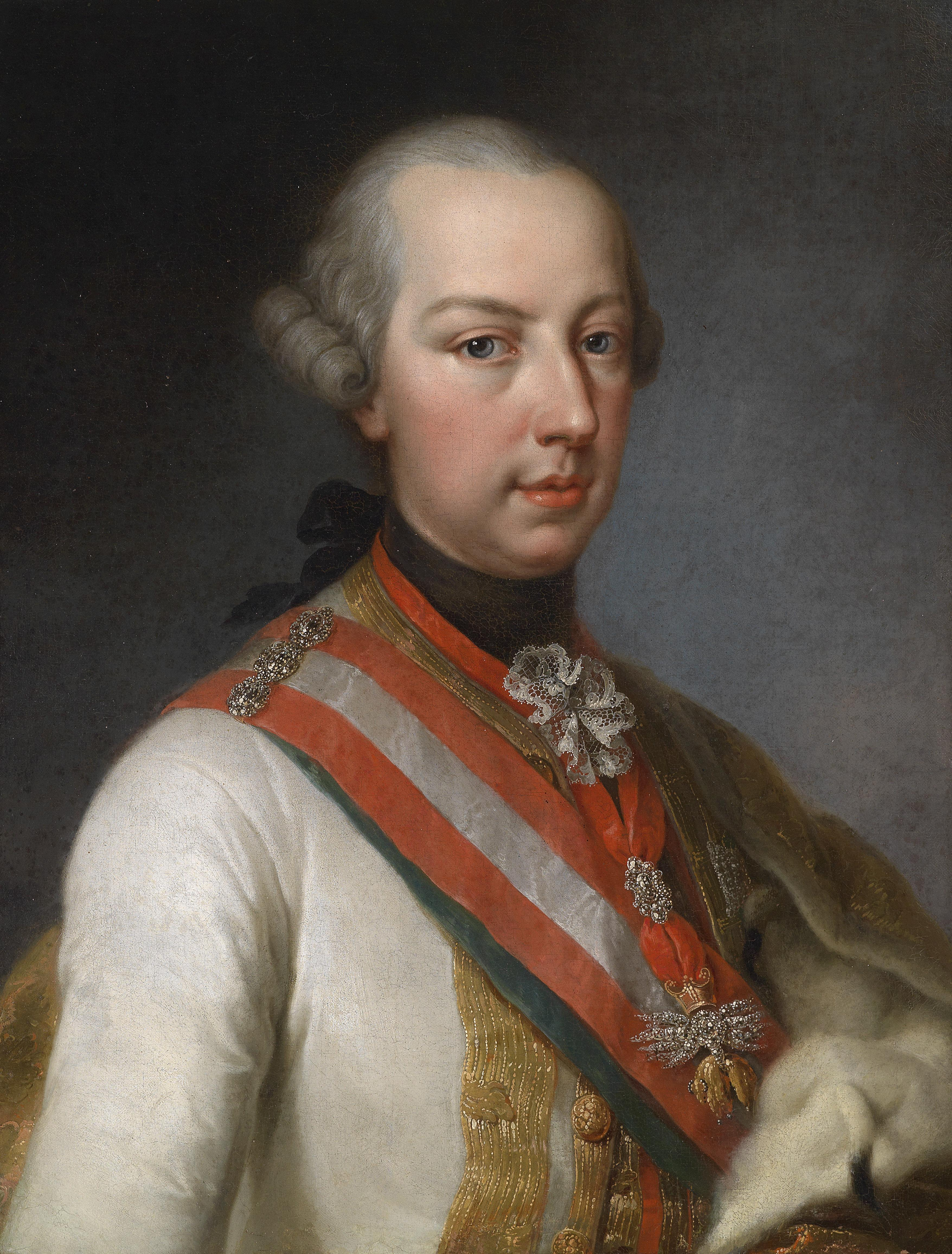
Joseph II, Holy Roman Emperor

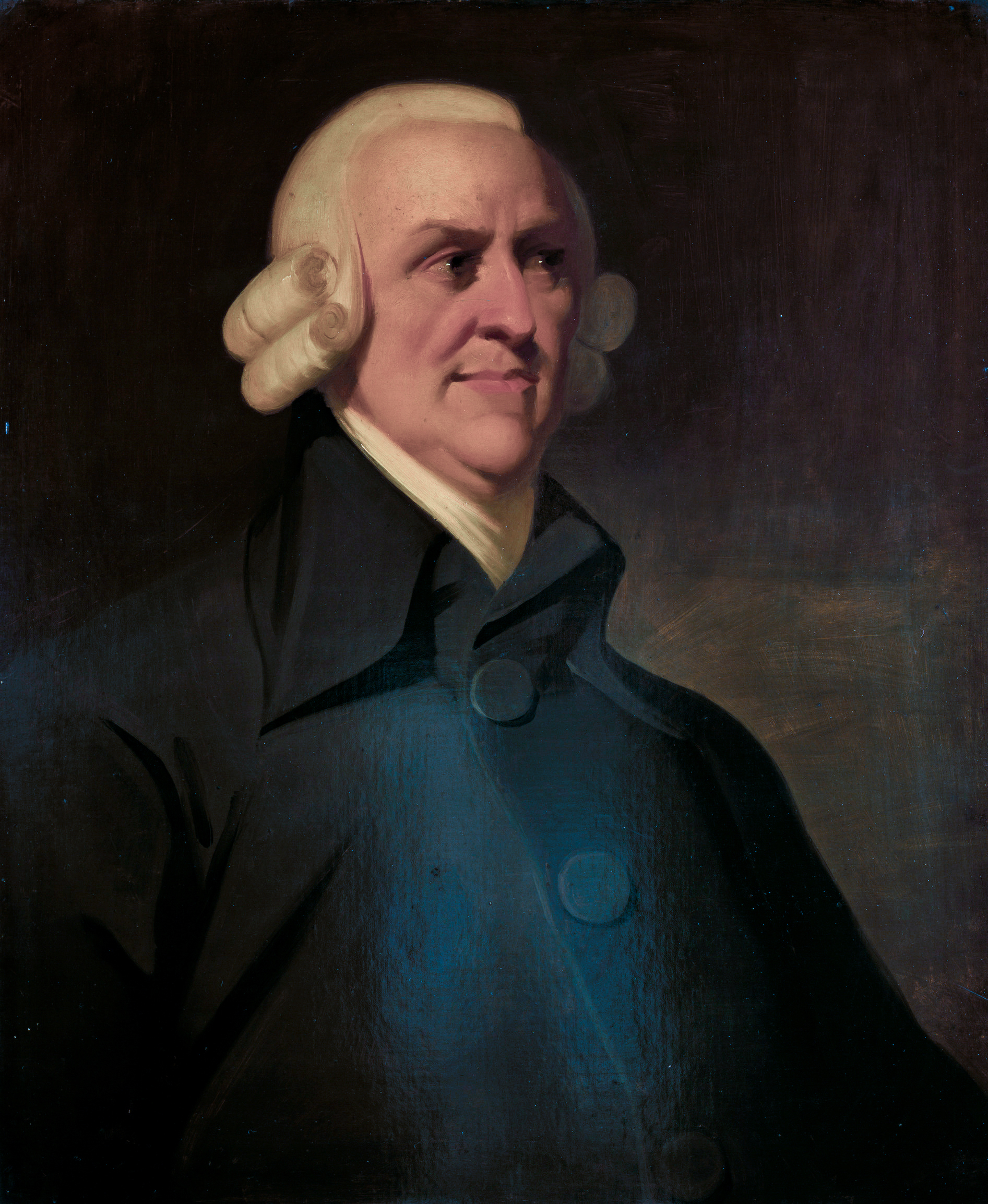
Adam Smith

- January 5 – Jacob Christian Schäffer, German inventor, botanist and professor (b. 1718)
- January 13 – Luc Urbain de Bouëxic, comte de Guichen, French admiral (b. 1712)
- January 15 – John Landen, English mathematician (b. 1719)
- January 20 – John Howard (prison reformer), English philanthropist (b. 1726)
- January 31 – Thomas Lewis, Irish-born Virginia settler (b. 1718)
- February 5 – William Cullen, Scottish physician, chemist (b. 1710)
- February 15– Juan Albano Pereira Márquez, godfather and tutor of Bernardo O'Higgins (b. 1728)
- February 18 – Elisabeth of Württemberg, Archduchess of Austria (b. 1767)
- February 20 – Joseph II, Holy Roman Emperor (b. 1741)
- March 4 – Henry Wisner, American Continental Congressman for New York (b. 1720)
- March 12
  - András Hadik, Austro-Hungarian general (b. 1710)
  - William Grayson, American Continental Congressman and United States Senator for Virginia (b. 1740)
- April 2 – Robert H. Harrison, American jurist and lieutenant colonel of the Continental Army (b. 1745)
- April 6 – Ludwig IX, Landgrave of Hesse-Darmstadt (b. 1719)
- April 17 – Benjamin Franklin, American scientist and statesman (b. 1706)
- April 29 – Charles-Nicolas Cochin, French artist (b. 1715)
- May 16 – Philip Yorke, 2nd Earl of Hardwicke, English politician (b. 1720)
- May 20 – Nathan Miller, American Continental Congressman for Rhode Island (b. 1743)
- May 21 – Thomas Warton, English poet (b. 1728)
- May 23 – George Montagu, 1st Duke of Montagu (b. 1712)
- May 26 – Nathaniel Folsom, American Continental Congressman for New Hampshire and Revolutionary War major general (b. 1726)
- May 29 – Israel Putnam, American Revolutionary War general (b. 1718)
- June 1 – Theodorick Bland, American Continental Congressman and U.S. Representative for Virginia (b. 1741)
- June 25 – Lovisa Augusti, Swedish opera singer (b. 1756)
- July 3 – Jean-Baptiste L. Romé de l'Isle, French chemist (b. 1736)
- July 6 – George Augustus Eliott, 1st Baron Heathfield, British army officer (b. 1717)
- July 7 – François Hemsterhuis, Dutch philosopher (b. 1721)
- July 14 – Ernst Gideon von Laudon, Austrian field marshal (b. 1717)
- July 17 – Adam Smith, Scottish economist, philosopher (b. 1723)
- July 25
  - Johann Bernhard Basedow, German educational reformer (b. 1723)
  - William Livingston, Governor of New Jersey (1776–1790) (b. 1723)
- August 16 – David Brearley, American Revolutionary War colonel, signer of the U.S. Constitution for New Jersey, and federal judge (b. 1745)
- September 2 – Johann Nikolaus von Hontheim, German historian, theologian (b. 1701)
- September 28 – Nikolaus I, Prince Esterházy, Hungarian prince (b. 1714)
- October 7 – Antoine Choquet de Lindu, French architect (b. 1712)
- October 14 – William Hooper, American signer of the Declaration of Independence and Continental Congressman for North Carolina (b. 1742)
- October 19 – Lyman Hall, American signer of the Declaration of Independence and Governor of Georgia (1783–1784) (b. 1724)
- November 2 – Lambert Krahe, German artist (b. 1712)
- November 6 – James Bowdoin, American Governor of Massachusetts (b. 1726)
- November 16 – Daniel of St. Thomas Jenifer, American Continental Congressman and Signer of the U.S. Constitution for Maryland (b. 1723)
- November 24 – Sir Hew Dalrymple, 2nd Baronet, Scottish politician and MP for Haddington Burghs on two occasions (b. 1712)
- December 16 – Benjamin Andrew, American Continental Congressman for Georgia and member of the Georgia House of Representatives (b. 1713)
- December 27/28 – Alvise Foscari, Venetian admiral (b. 1724)
- December 29 – Maria Teresa Cybo-Malaspina, Duchess of Massa, Italian ruler (b. 1725)
- date unknown
  - Helen Gloag, Scottish slave, Empress of Morocco (b. 1750)
  - Susanna Passavant, English luxury goods retailer (b. 1711)

1791

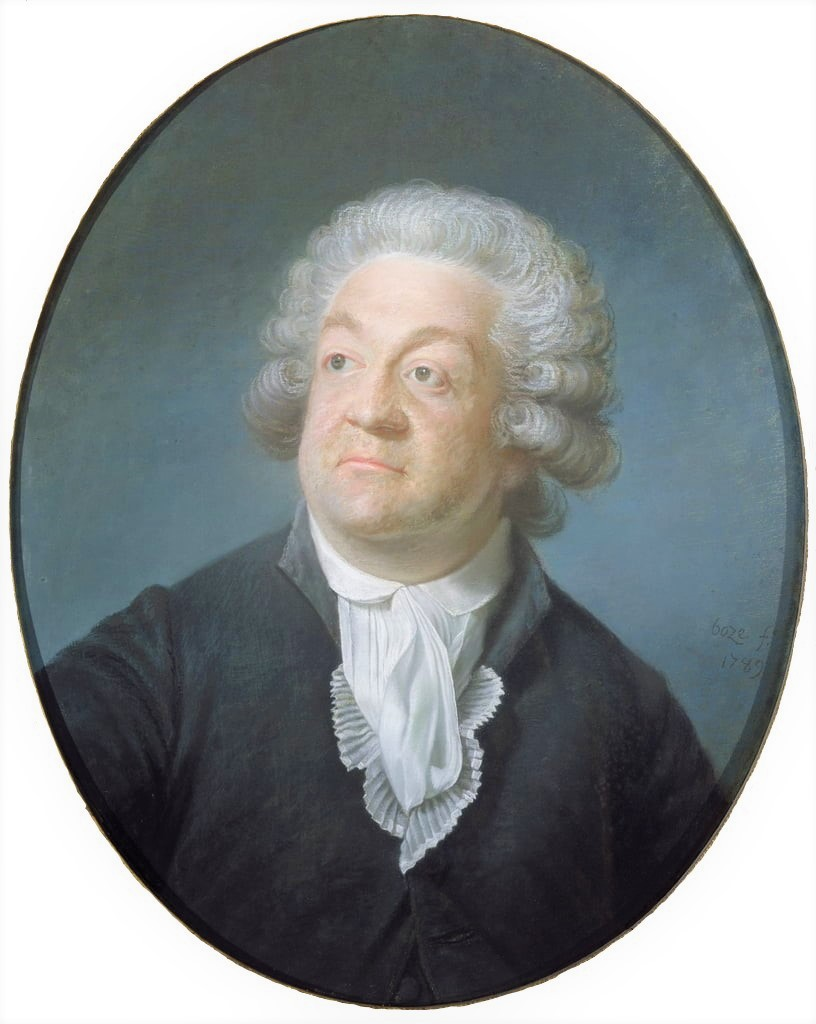
Honoré Gabriel Riqueti, comte de Mirabeau

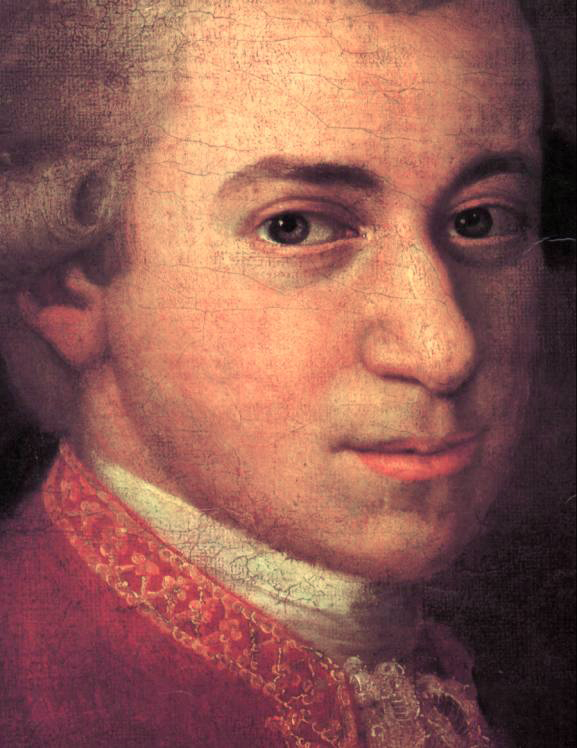
Wolfgang Amadeus Mozart

- January 11 – William Williams Pantycelyn, Welsh hymnist (b. 1717)
- January 23 – Johann Phillip Fabricius, German missionary (b. 1711)
- March 2 – John Wesley, English founder of Methodism (b. 1703)
- March 10 – William Wentworth, 2nd Earl of Strafford (1722–1791), England (b. 1722)
- March 14 – Johann Salomo Semler, German historian, Bible commentator (b. 1725)
- March 31 – Ralph Verney, 2nd Earl Verney of Ireland (b. 1714)
- April 2 – Honoré Gabriel Riqueti, comte de Mirabeau, French revolutionary leader (b. 1749)
- April 19 – Richard Price, Welsh philosopher (b. 1723)
- April 24 – Benjamin Harrison V, signer of the United States Declaration of Independence (b. 1726)
- May 9 – Francis Hopkinson, signer of the United States Declaration of Independence (b. 1737)
- June 5 – Frederick Haldimand, Swiss-born British colonial governor (b. 1718)
- June 10 – Toussaint-Guillaume Picquet de la Motte, French admiral (b. 1720)
- June 17 – Selina Hastings, Countess of Huntingdon, English Methodist leader (b. 1707)
- June 30 – Jean-Baptiste Descamps, Flemish painter and art historian (b. 1714)
- July 9 – Jacques-Nicolas Tardieu, French engraver (b. 1716)
- July 17 – Martin Dobrizhoffer, Austrian Jesuit missionary (b. 1717)
- July 25 – Isaac Low, American delegate to the Continental Congress (b. 1735)
- August 22 – Johann David Michaelis, German biblical scholar and teacher (b. 1717)
- September 25 – William Bradford, American printer (b. 1719)
- October 7 – Mary Frances of the Five Wounds, Italian Franciscan saint (b. 1715)
- October 12
  - Anna Louisa Karsch, German poet (b. 1722)
  - Peter Oliver, Massachusetts colonial judge (b. 1713)
- October 16 – Grigory Potemkin, Russian military leader, statesman, nobleman and favourite of Catherine the Great (b. 1739)
- November 4 – Richard Butler, American soldier (b. 1743)
- November 16 – Edward Penny, British painter (b. 1714)
- December 5 – Wolfgang Amadeus Mozart, German composer (b. in Salzburg, then part of the kingdom of Germany 1756)
- December 12
  - Etteilla, French occult cartomancer (b. 1738)
  - Catharina Freymann, Norwegian pietist leader (b. 1708)
- December 13 – Mathieu Tillet, French botanist (b. 1714)
- December 19 – Jean-François de Neufforge, Flemish architect and engraver (b. 1714)
- December 27 – John Monro, British physician of Bethlem Hospital (b. 1716)
- date unknown – Maria Petraccini, Italian anatomist, physician (b. 1759)

1792

=== January–June ===
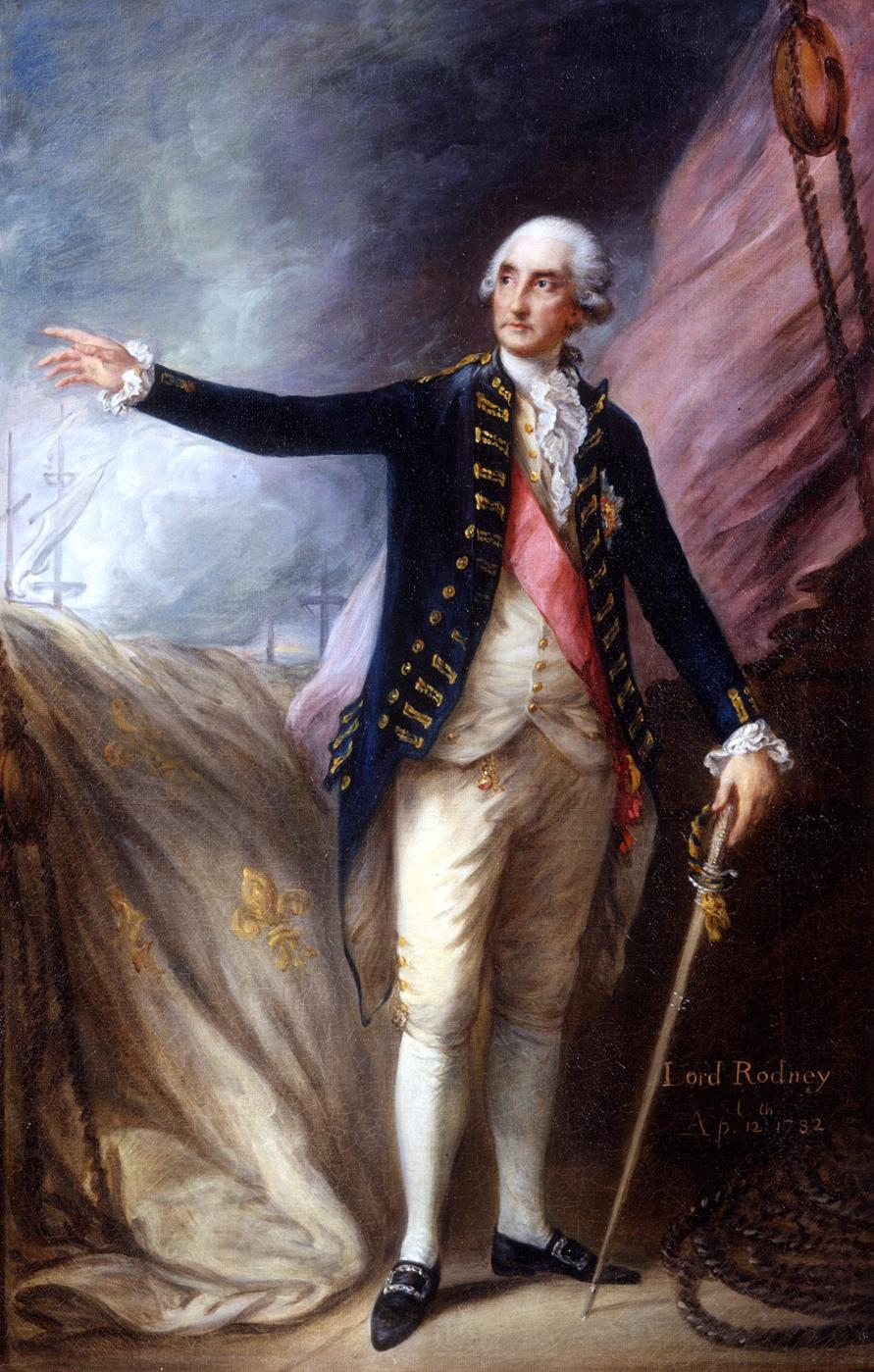
George Rodney, 1st Baron Rodney

- January 17 – George Horne, British academic and Bishop of Norwich (b.1730)
- February 15 – John Witherspoon, Scottish American signer of the Declaration of Independence (b. 1723)
- February 23 – Sir Joshua Reynolds, English painter (b. 1723)
- March 1
  - Leopold II, Holy Roman Emperor (b. 1747)
  - Angelo Emo, Venetian admiral and statesman (b. 1731)
  - Jean Godin des Odonais, French cartographer and naturalist (b. 1713)
- March 3 – Robert Adam, Scottish architect and designer (b. 1728)
- March 10 – John Stuart, 3rd Earl of Bute, Prime Minister of the United Kingdom (b. 1713)
- March 23 – Luís António Verney, Portuguese philosopher and pedagogue (b. 1713)
- March 29 – King Gustav III of Sweden (assassinated) (b. 1746)
- April 3 – Sir George Pocock, British admiral (b. 1706)
- April 4 – James Sykes, American politician (b. 1725)
- April 14 – Maximilian Hell, Slovakian astronomer (b. 1720)
- April 20 – Matthias von Schoenberg, Catholic author (b. 1732)
- April 23 – Karl Friedrich Bahrdt, German theologian, adventurer (b. 1741)
- April 30 – John Montagu, 4th Earl of Sandwich, English statesman (b. 1718)
- May 10 – John Stevens, American delegate to the Continental Congress (b. c. 1715)
- May 12 – Charles Simon Favart, French dramatist (b. 1710)
- May 24 – George Rodney, 1st Baron Rodney, British naval officer (b. 1718)
- June 4 – John Burgoyne, British general (b. 1723)
- June 22 – Muhammad ibn Abd al-Wahhab, Arabian Wahhabi preacher (b. 1703)

=== July–December ===
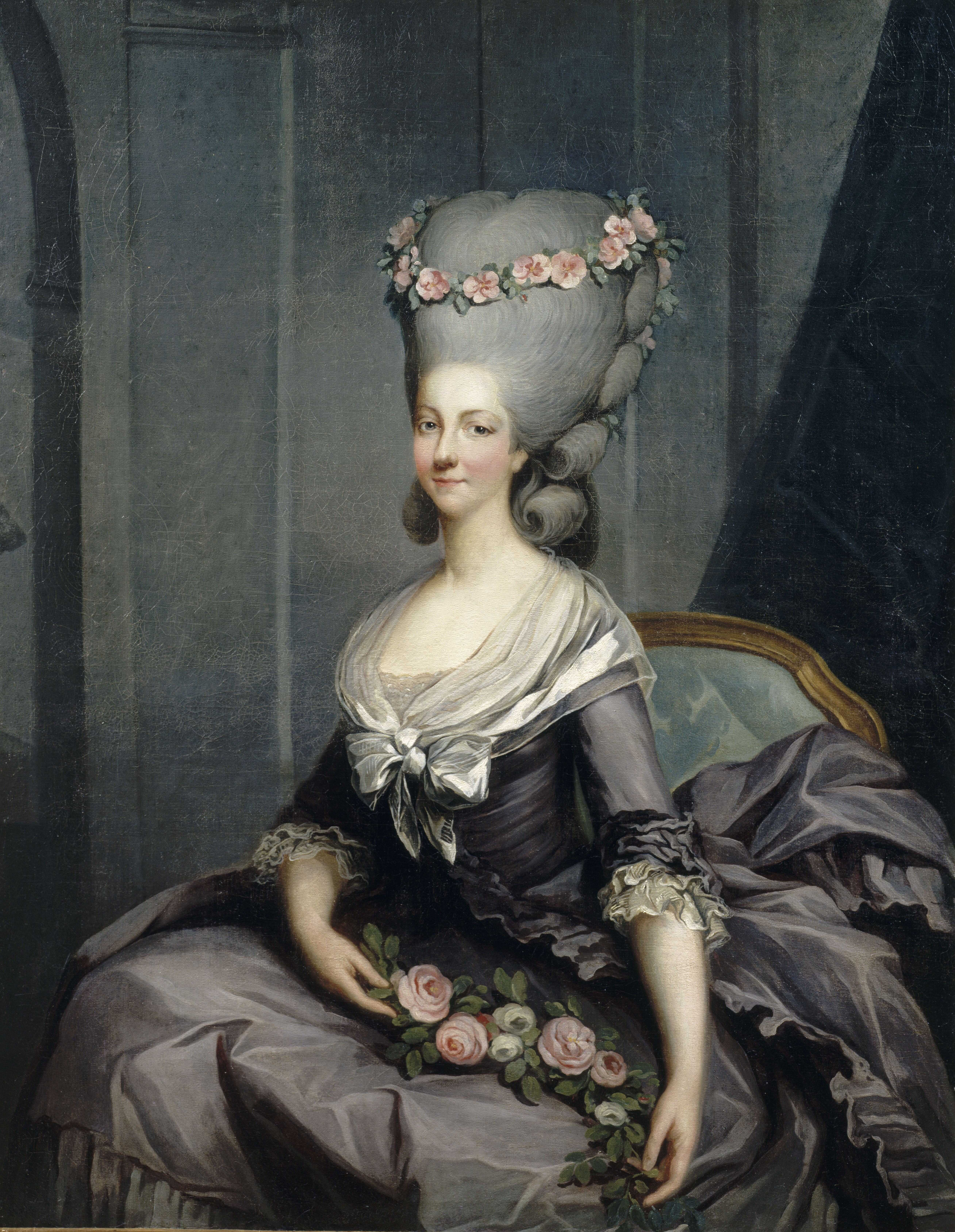
Marie Thérèse Louise of Savoy, Princesse de Lamballe

- July 3 – Duke Ferdinand of Brunswick-Wolfenbüttel (b. 1721)
- July 18 – John Paul Jones, American-born naval captain (b. 1747)
- July 21 – Richard Hancorne, British Royal Navy officer (b. 1754)
- July 29 – René Nicolas Charles Augustin de Maupeou, Chancellor of France (b. 1714)
- August 3 – Richard Arkwright, English inventor (b. 1732)
- August 4 – John Burgoyne, British army officer, playwright and politician (b. 1722)
- August 5 – Frederick North, Lord North, Prime Minister of Great Britain (b. 1732)
- September 3 – Marie Thérèse Louise of Savoy, Princesse de Lamballe, French princess, courtier to Marie Antoinette (killed in September Massacres) (b. 1749)
- September 8 – Charles d'Abancour, French statesman (killed in September Massacres) (b. 1758)
- September 16 – Nguyễn Huệ, Vietnamese emperor (b. 1753)
- September 18 – August Gottlieb Spangenberg, German religious leader (b. 1704)
- September 25 – Adam Gottlob Moltke, Danish statesman (b. 1710)
- September 29 – George Browne, Russian-Irish field-marshal (b. 1698)
- October 7 – George Mason, American patriot (b. 1725)
- October 14 – Sophie Charlotte Ackermann, German actress (b. 1714)
- October 21 – Anders Rudolf du Rietz, Swedish general, count and politician (b. 1722)
- October 22 – Guillaume Le Gentil, French astronomer (b. 1725)
- October 28
  - Paul Möhring, German physician and scientist (b. 1710)
  - John Smeaton, English civil engineer (b. 1724)
- November – Samuel Hearne, English explorer, fur-trader, author and naturalist (b. 1745)
- December 7 – Marie Jeanne Riccoboni (Laboras de Mezières), French novelist (b. 1714)
- December 8 – Henry Laurens, political leader during the American Revolutionary War, father of John Laurens (b. 1724)
- December 15
  - Joseph Martin Kraus, Swedish composer (b. 1756)
  - Hugh Pigot, British Royal Navy admiral (b. 1722)

1793

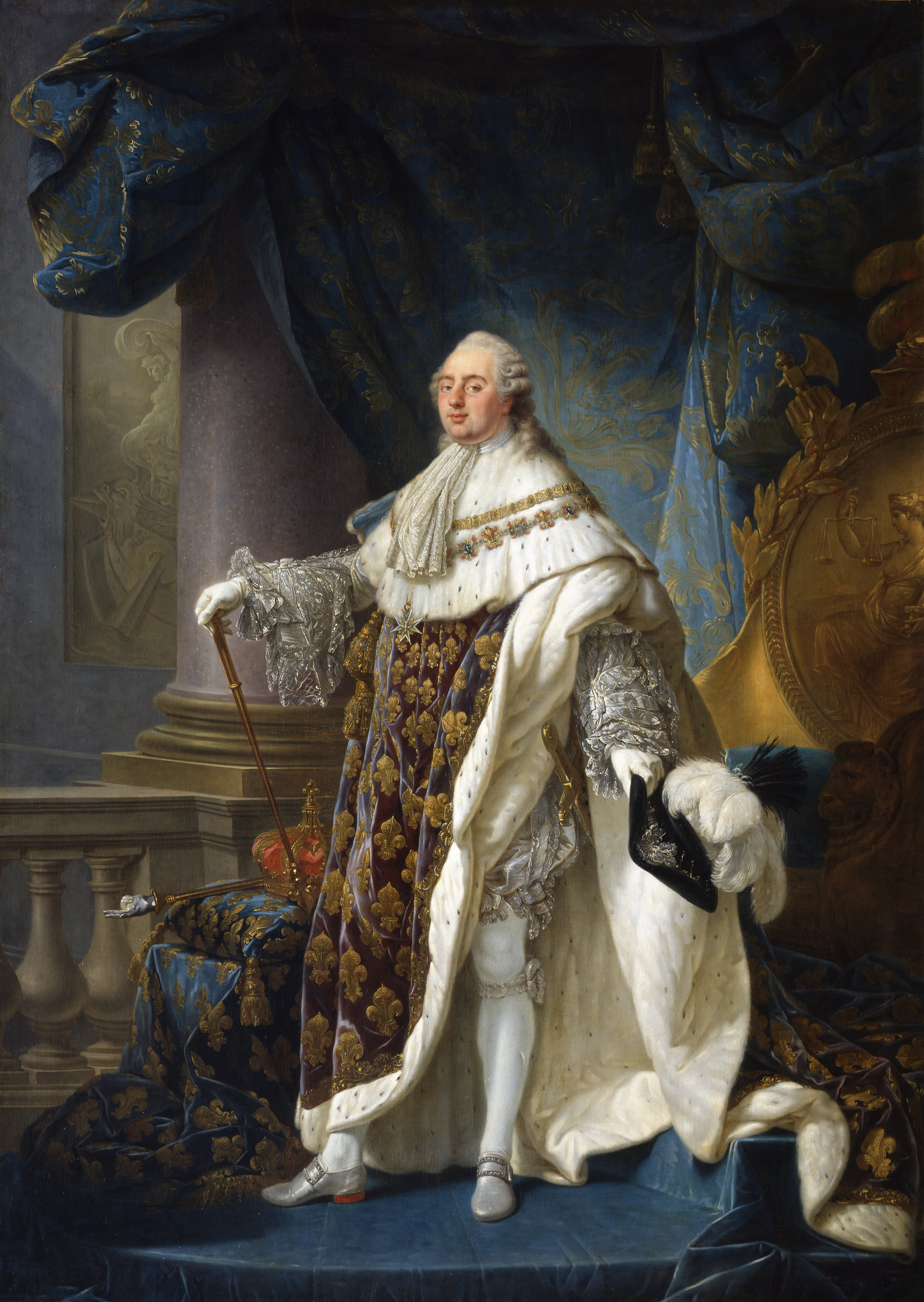
Louis XVI

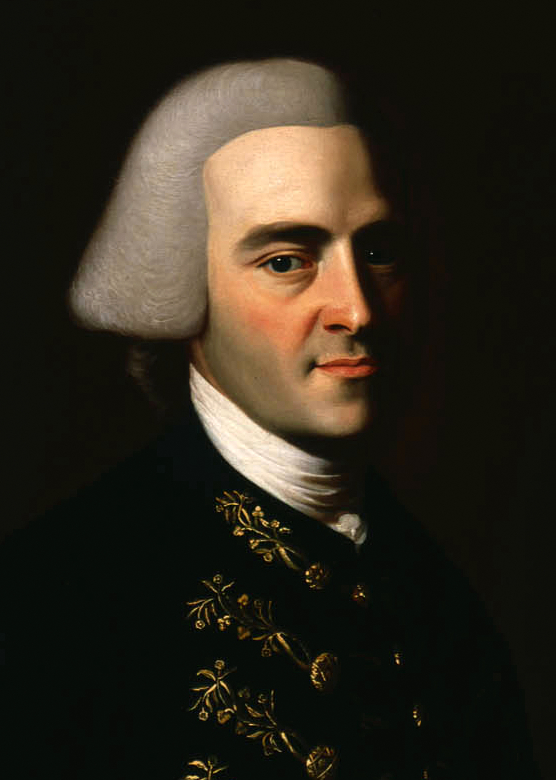
John Hancock

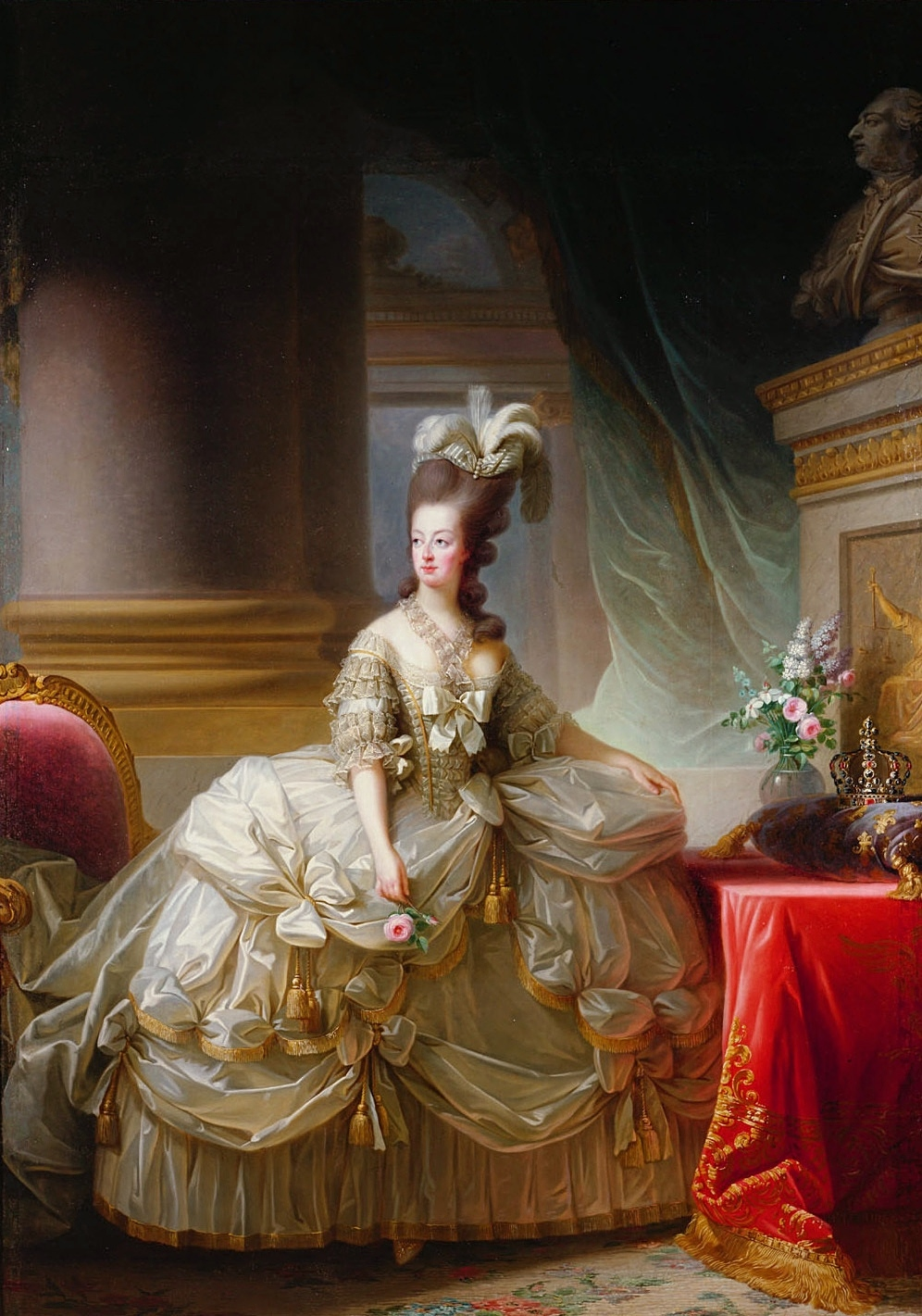
Marie Antoinette

- January 1 – Francesco Guardi, Italian painter (b. 1712)
- January 21 – King Louis XVI of France (executed) (b. 1754)
- February 1 – William Barrington, 2nd Viscount Barrington, British statesman (b. 1717)
- February 2 – Samuel Whittemore, American farmer and oldest known colonial combatant of the American Revolution (b. 1696)
- February 6 – Carlo Goldoni, Italian playwright (b. 1707)
- March 2 – Carl Gustaf Pilo, Swedish-born artist (b. 1711)
- March 4 – Louis Jean Marie de Bourbon, Duke of Penthièvre, French admiral (b. 1725)
- March 20 – William Murray, 1st Earl of Mansfield, Scottish judge, politician (b. 1705)
- March 26 – John Mudge, English physician, inventor (b. 1721)
- April 13 – Princess Marie Victoire d'Arenberg, Margravine of Baden-Baden as consort of Augustus George (b. 1714)
- April 15 – Ignacije Szentmartony, Croatian Jesuit missionary, geographer (b. 1718)
- April 29
  - Yechezkel Landau, Polish rabbi, Talmudist (b. 1713)
  - John Michell, English scientist (b. 1724)
- May 3 – Martin Gerbert, German theologian, historian (b. 1720)
- May 7 – Pietro Nardini, Italian composer (b. 1722)
- May 18 – Timur Shah Durrani, ruler of the Durrani Empire (b. 1748)
- May 20 – Charles Bonnet, Swiss naturalist (b. 1720)
- May 26 – Eliza Lucas, American agronomist (b. 1722)
- June 26 – Gilbert White, English ornithologist (b. 1720)
- July 13 – Jean-Paul Marat, Swiss-born French Revolutionary leader (assassinated) (b. 1743)
- July 17 – Charlotte Corday, French assassin of Jean-Paul Marat (executed) (b. 1768)
- July 23 – Roger Sherman, American lawyer, signer of the Declaration of Independence (b. 1721)
- July 26 – Alessandro Besozzi, Italian composer (b. 1702)
- August 22
  - Louis de Noailles, French peer and Marshal of France (b. 1713)
  - John Thomas, Dean of Westminster; Bishop of Rochester (b. 1712)
- August 28 – Adam Philippe, Comte de Custine, French general (executed) (b. 1740)
- September 17 – George Handley, American politician (b. 1752)
- September 20 – Fletcher Christian, English sailor (b. 1764)
- October 7
  - Wills Hill, 1st Marquess of Downshire, English politician (b. 1718)
  - Antoine Joseph Gorsas, French publicist, politician (executed) (b. 1752)
- October 8 – John Hancock, American businessman and patriot, signer of the Declaration of Independence (b. 1737)
- October 9 – Jean Joseph Marie Amiot, French Jesuit missionary (b. 1718)
- October 16 – Marie-Antoinette, Queen Consort of France (executed) (b. 1755)
- October 31
  - Pierre Victurnien Vergniaud, French revolutionary leader (executed) (b. 1744)
  - Claude Fauchet, French revolutionary leader (executed) (b. 1754)
  - Armand Gensonné, French revolutionary leader (executed) (b. 1758)
  - Jacques Pierre Brissot, French revolutionary leader (executed) (b. 1754)
- November 3 – Olympe de Gouges, French playwright (executed) (b. 1748)
- November 6 – Louis Philippe II, Duke of Orléans, French noble, revolutionary leader (executed) (b. 1747)
- November 8 – Madame Roland, French Revolutionary hostess (executed) (b. 1754)
- November 10 – Jean-Marie Roland, vicomte de la Platière, French revolutionary leader (suicide) (b. 1734)
- November 12 – Jean Sylvain Bailly, French astronomer (b. 1736)
- November 14 – Caterina Dolfin, Italian (Venetian) poet (b. 1736)
- November 24 – Clément Charles François de Laverdy, French statesman (executed) (b. 1723)
- November 29 – Antoine Barnave, French revolutionary leader (executed) (b. 1761)
- December 4 – Armand de Kersaint, French revolutionary leader (executed) (b. 1742)
- December 5 – Jean-Paul Rabaut Saint-Étienne French revolutionary leader (executed) (b. 1743)
- December 6 – Sir John Dashwood-King, 3rd Baronet, English country gentleman (b. 1716)
- December 7 – Joseph Bara, French Revolution child-hero (b. 1780)
- December 8
  - Étienne Clavière, French financier, politician (suicide) (b. 1735)
  - Madame du Barry, French courtesan (executed) (b. 1743)
- date unknown – Im Yunjidang, Korean scholar, writer and neo-Confucian philosopher (b. 1721)

1794

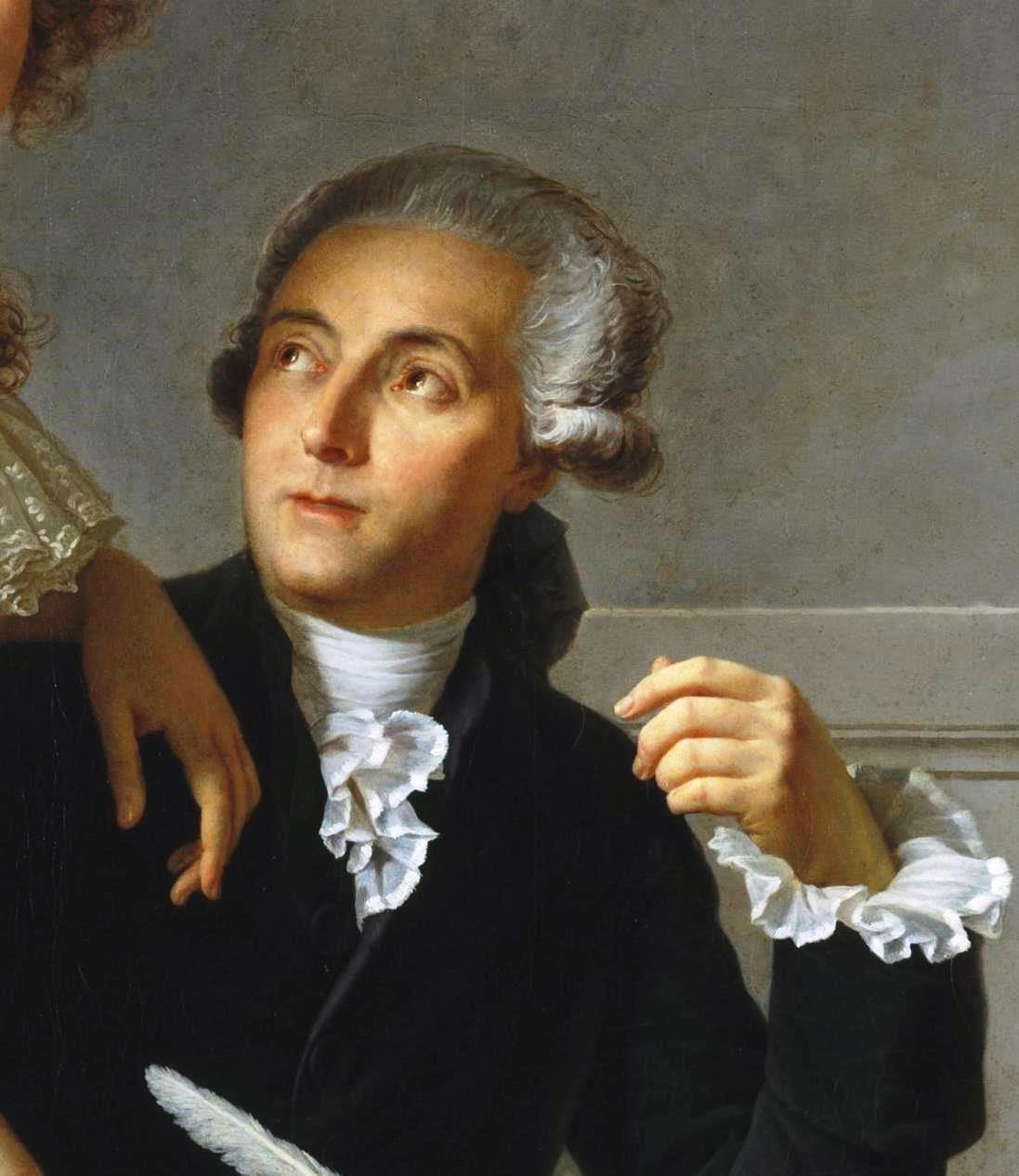
Antoine Lavoisier

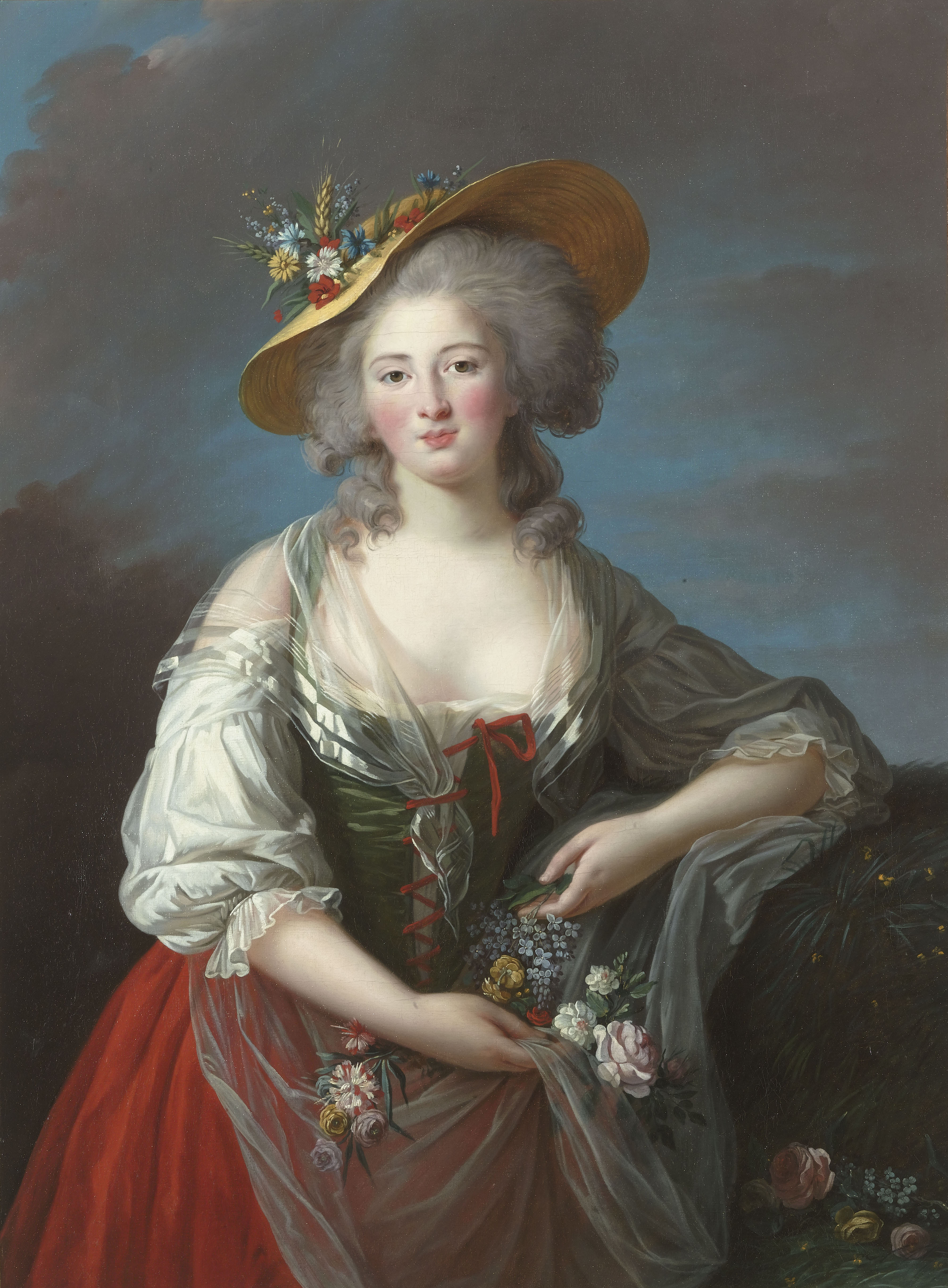
Élisabeth of France

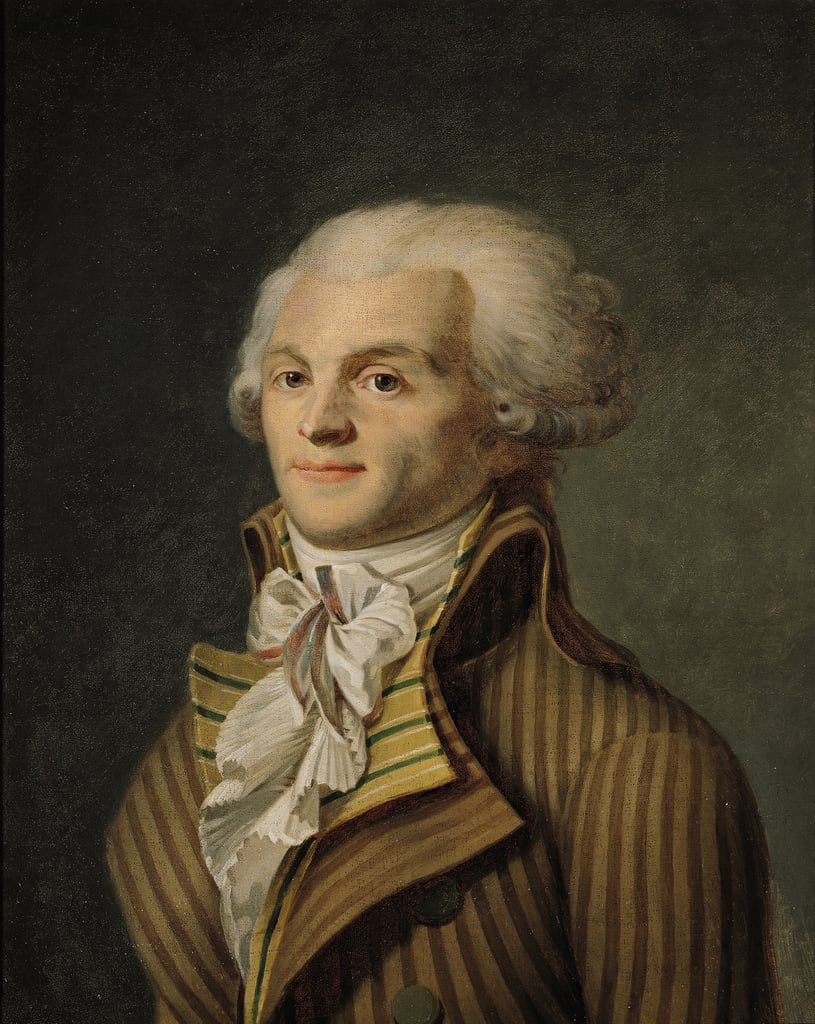
Maximilien Robespierre

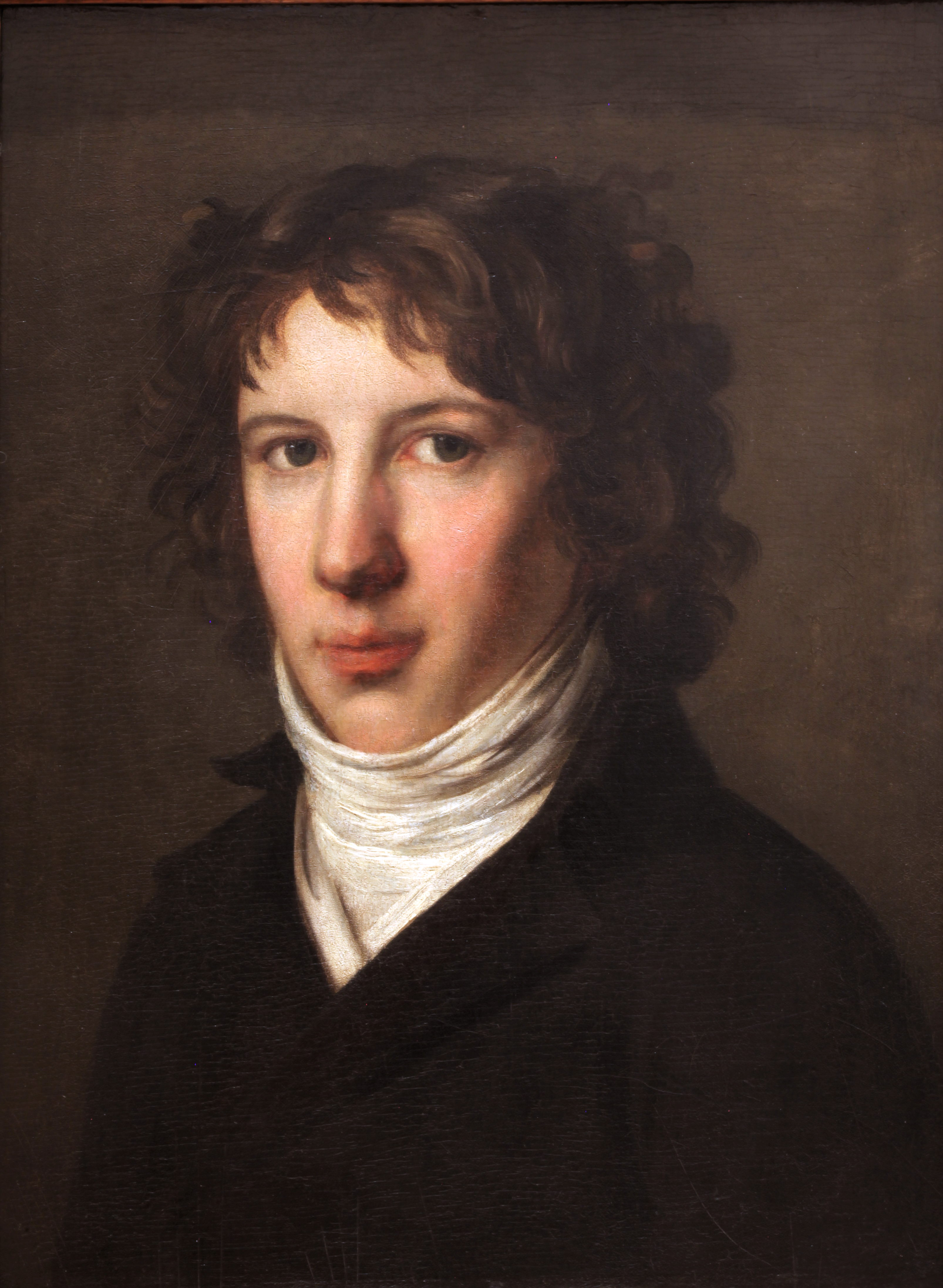
Louis Antoine de Saint-Just

- January 4 – Nicolas Luckner, Marshal of France (executed) (b. 1722)
- January 6
  - Pierre Bouchet, French physician (b. 1752)
  - Maurice d'Elbée, French Revolutionary leader (executed) (b. 1752)
- January 8 – Justus Möser, German statesman (b. 1720)
- January 11 – Caroline Townshend, 1st Baroness Greenwich, English peeress (b. 1717)
- January 16 – Edward Gibbon, English historian (b. 1737)
- January 17 – Peniston Portlock Powney, English politician (b. 1743)
- January 24 – Marie-Adélaïde de La Touche-Limouzinière, French aristocrat, counter-revolutionary and combatant in the War of the Vendée (b. 1760)
- January 28 – Henri de la Rochejaquelein, French Revolutionary leader (b. 1772)
- January 31 – Mariot Arbuthnot, British admiral (b. 1711)
- February 10 – Jacques Roux, French priest (b. 1752)
- February 12 – Mahadaji Shinde, Maratha emperor of India (1764–1794)
- March 24 – Jacques Hébert, French Revolutionary leader (executed) (b. 1757)
- March 29 – Marquis de Condorcet, French mathematician, philosopher and political scientist (died in prison) (b. 1743)
- April 5
  - Georges Danton, French Revolutionary leader (executed) (b. 1759)
  - Camille Desmoulins, French Revolutionary leader (executed) (b. 1760)
  - Marie-Jean Hérault de Séchelles, French Revolutionary leader (executed) (b. 1759)
  - Fabre d'Églantine, French dramatist, revolutionary (executed) (b. 1750)
  - François Joseph Westermann, French Revolutionary leader and general (executed) (b. 1751)
- April 13
  - Pierre Gaspard Chaumette, French Revolutionary leader (executed) (b. 1763)
  - Lucile Duplessis, wife of Camille Desmoulins (executed) (b. 1770)
- April 17 – Angélique du Coudray, pioneering French midwife (b. 1714)
- April 18 – Charles Pratt, 1st Earl Camden, Lord Chancellor of Great Britain (b. 1714)
- April 23 – Guillaume-Chrétien de Lamoignon de Malesherbes, French statesman (executed) (b. 1721)
- April 27
  - James Bruce, Scottish explorer (b. 1730)
  - Sir William Jones, British philologist (b. 1746)
- May 8 – Antoine Lavoisier, French chemist (executed) (b. 1743)
- May 10 – Élisabeth of France, French princess (executed) (b. 1764)
- May 17 – Sir Thomas Dyke Acland, 9th Baronet (b. 1752)
- May 27 – Mary Palmer, English writer (b. 1716)
- June 14 – Francis Seymour-Conway, 1st Marquess of Hertford, Viceroy of Ireland (b. 1718)
- June 17 – Marguerite-Élie Guadet, French Revolutionary leader (executed) (b. 1753)
- June 18
  - François Buzot, French Revolutionary leader (suicide) (b. 1760)
  - James Murray, British military officer, administrator (b. 1721)
- June 19 – Richard Henry Lee, 12th President of the Continental Congress (b. 1732)
- June 25 – Jean-Olivier Briand, French-born Catholic bishop of Quebec (b. 1715)
- June 27
  - Wenzel Anton, Prince of Kaunitz-Rietberg, Austrian statesman (b. 1711)
  - Philippe de Noailles, French soldier (executed) (b. 1715)
  - Victor de Broglie, French soldier (executed) (b. 1756)
- July 13 – James Lind, British pioneer of naval hygiene in the Royal Navy (b. 1716)
- July 17 – John Roebuck, English inventor (b. 1718)
- July 23 – Alexandre de Beauharnais, French politician and general (executed) (b. 1760)
- July 25
  - André Chénier, French writer (executed) (b. 1762)
  - Joseph Frye, American general (b. 1712)
- July 28
  - Maximilien Robespierre, French Revolutionary leader (executed) (b. 1758)
  - Augustin Robespierre, French Revolutionary leader (executed) (b. 1763)
  - Louis Antoine de Saint-Just, French Revolutionary leader (executed) (b. 1767)
  - Jean-Baptiste de Lavalette, French general (executed) (b. 1753)
  - François Hanriot, French Revolutionary leader (executed) (b. 1761)
- August 6 – Henry Bathurst, 2nd Earl Bathurst, British politician (b. 1714)
- August 14 – Jacoba van den Brande, Dutch cultural personality (b. 1735)
- August 17 – Countess Palatine Elisabeth Auguste of Sulzbach, politically active Electress of Bavaria (b. 1721)
- September 1 – Catherine Théot, French visionary (b. 1716)
- September 4 – John Hely-Hutchinson, Irish statesman (b. 1724)
- September 15 – Abraham Clark, American signer of the Declaration of Independence (b. 1725)
- September 16 – Hester Bateman, English silversmith (bap. 1708)
- September 25 – Paul Rabaut, French Huguenot pastor (b. 1718)
- October 21
  - Francis Light, founder of the British colony of Penang (b. 1740)
  - Antoine Petit, French physician (b. 1722)
- November 3 – François-Joachim de Pierre de Bernis, French cardinal, statesman (b. 1715)
- November 9 – Thomas Walker, distinguished Virginia physician, explorer (b. 1715)
- November 15
  - Countess Palatine Maria Franziska of Sulzbach, German aristocrat (b. 1724)
  - John Witherspoon, American signer of the Declaration of Independence (b. 1723)
- November 22
  - John Alsop, American Continental Congressman (b. 1724)
  - Alison Cockburn, British poet (b. 1712)
- November 28
  - Friedrich Wilhelm von Steuben, Prussian army officer (b. 1730)
  - Sir James Tylney-Long, 7th Baronet, English politician (b. 1736)
- December 2 – Johann Gottlob Leidenfrost, German physician (b. 1715)
- December 12 – Meshullam Feivush Heller, Austrian Hasidic author (b. c. 1742)
- December 16 – Jean-Baptiste Carrier, French Revolutionary leader (executed) (b. 1756)

1795

=== January–March ===
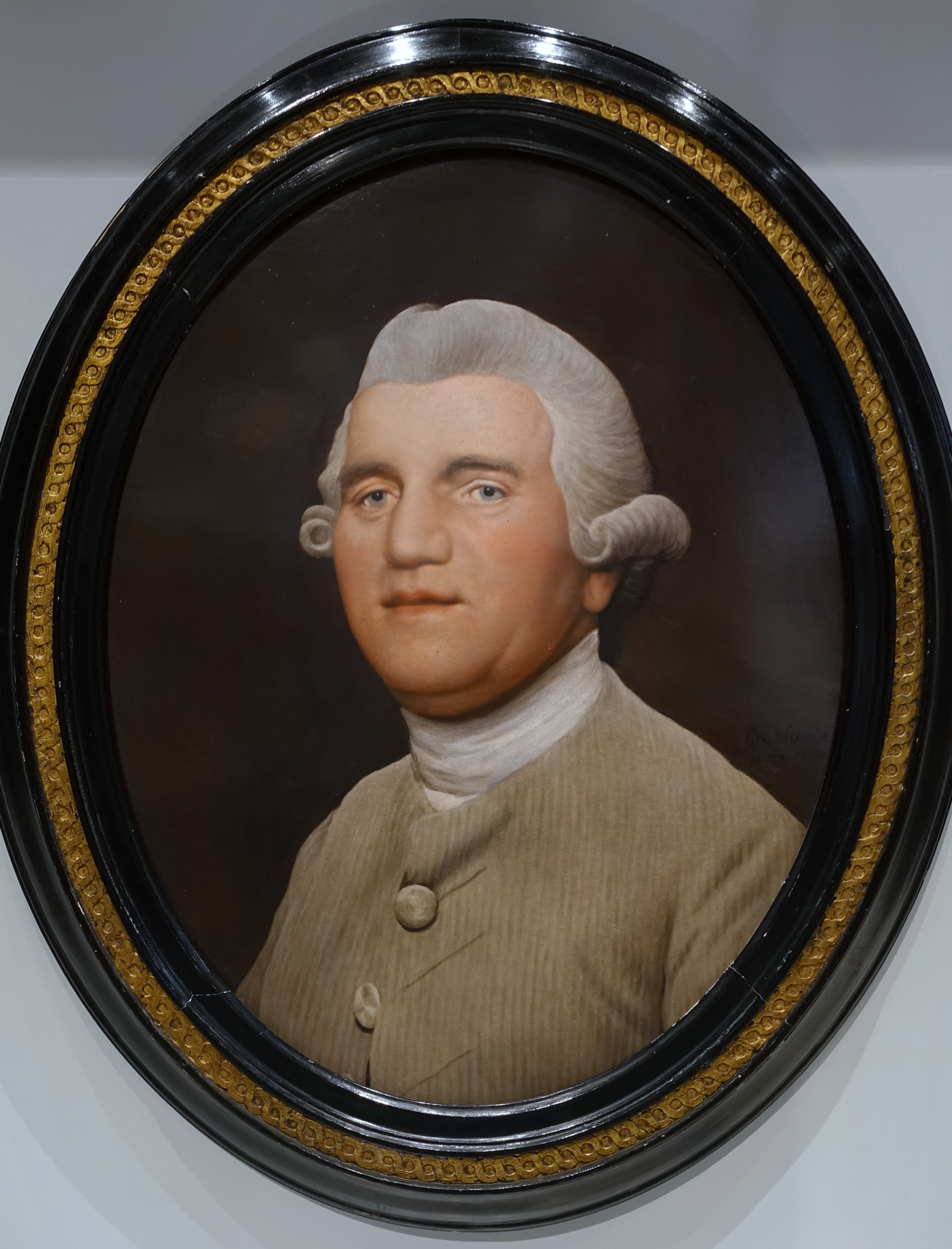
Josiah Wedgwood

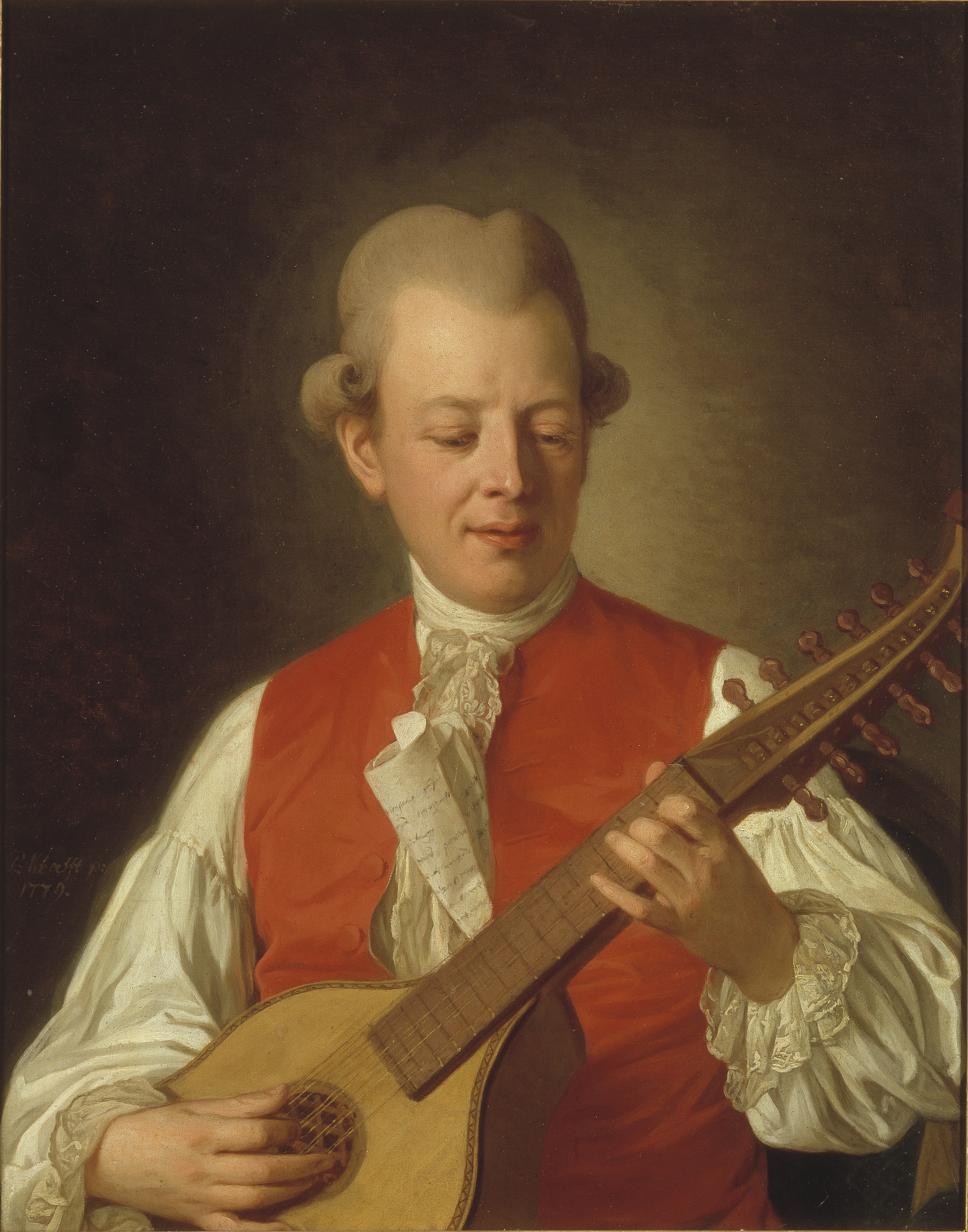
Carl Michael Bellman

- January 3 – Josiah Wedgwood, English potter, entrepreneur (b. 1730)
- January 5
  - Jacobo Fitz-James Stuart, 6th Duke of Liria and Jérica, Spanish noble (b. 1792)
  - Philipp Gotthard von Schaffgotsch, German Prince-Bishop (b. 1716)
- January 10 – David Blackburn, British Royal Navy officer (b. 1753)
- January 19 – Thomas Balguy, English churchman (b. 1716)
- January 21 – Samuel Wallis, English navigator (b. 1728)
- January 22 – Richard Clinton, officer in the Continental Army during the American Revolution (b. 1741)
- January 23 – John Sullivan, American general in the American Revolutionary War, delegate in the Continental Congress (b. 1740)
- January 25 – Morgan Edwards, Welsh-born clergyman (b. 1722)
- January 26 – Johann Christoph Friedrich Bach, German harpsichordist, composer (b. 1732)
- February 3 – Richard Edwards, British naval officer and colonial governor of Newfoundland (b. c. 1715)
- February 7 – Antoine Polier, Swiss adventurer (b. 1741)
- February 11 – Carl Michael Bellman, Swedish poet (b. 1740)
- February 14 – Samuel Cook Silliman, member of the Connecticut House of Representatives from Norwalk (b. 1741)
- February 27
  - Tanikaze Kajinosuke, Japanese sumo wrestler (b. 1750)
  - Richard Clarke, Massachusetts merchant (b. 1711)
- March 4 – John Collins, 3rd Governor of Rhode Island (b. 1717)
- March 5 – Josef Reicha, Czech cellist (b. 1752)
- March 9 – John Armstrong, Sr., American civil engineer and major general during the Revolutionary War (b. 1717)
- March 15 – Louisa Catharina Harkort, German ironmaster (b. 1718)
- March 18 – Jonathan Buck, founder of Bucksport, Maine (b. 1719)
- March 21
  - Giovanni Arduino, Italian geologist (b. 1714)
  - Honoré III, Prince of Monaco (b. 1720)

=== April–June ===
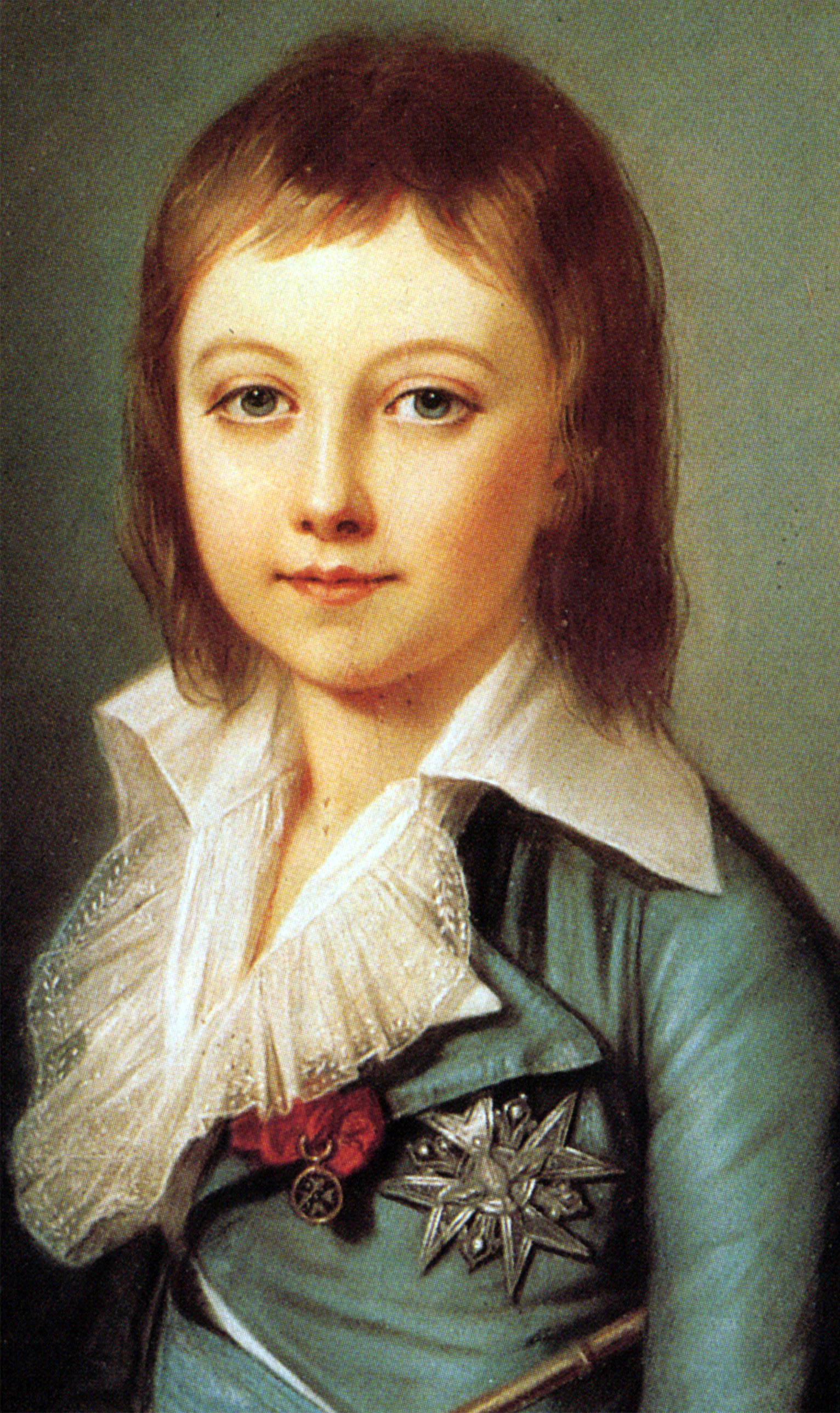
"Louis XVII" of France

- April 1 – Charles II August, Duke of Zweibrücken (b. 1746)
- April 6 – George Collier, British Royal Navy officer served during the Seven Years' War (b. 1738)
- April 12 – Johann Kaspar Basselet von La Rosée, Bavarian general (b. 1710)
- April 30 – Jean-Jacques Barthélemy, French writer and numismatist (b. 1716)
- May 2 – Increase Moseley, American politician (b. 1712)
- May 6 – Pieter Boddaert, Dutch physician and naturalist (b. 1730)
- May 7 – Antoine Quentin Fouquier-Tinville, French revolutionary leader (executed) (b. 1746)
- May 11 – Joachim Edler von Popper, Austrian banker (b. 1722)
- May 12 – Ezra Stiles, American academic, educator and author (b. 1727)
- May 17 – Thomas Pelham-Clinton, 3rd Duke of Newcastle, British Army general (b. 1752)
- May 18 – Robert Rogers, British Army officer and American colonial frontiersman (b. 1731)
- May 19
  - Josiah Bartlett, signer of the United States Declaration of Independence (b. 1729)
  - James Boswell, Scottish author (b. 1740)
- May 20
  - Francesco Paolo Di Blasi, Sicilian jurist (b. 1753)
  - Louis Eugene, Duke of Württemberg, third son of Duke Karl Alexander (b. 1731)
- May 27 – Thomas-Laurent Bédard, Canadian priest (b. 1747)
- June 1 – Pierre-Joseph Desault, French anatomist and surgeon (b. 1744)
- June 8 – Titular King Louis XVII of France (b. 1785)
- June 13 – Stephen Popham, British politician and solicitor (b. 1745)
- June 17 – Gilbert Romme, French politician and mathematician (b. 1750)
- June 18 – Marie Marguerite Bihéron, French anatomist (b. 1719)
- June 23 – James Craig, Scottish architect (b. 1739)
- June 24 – William Smellie, Scottish printer and encyclopedist (b. 1740)

=== July–September ===
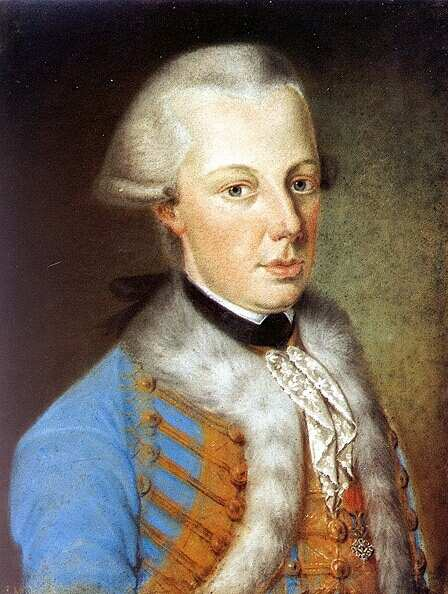
Archduke Alexander Leopold of Austria

- July 3
  - Louis-Georges de Bréquigny, French historian (b. 1714)
  - Antonio de Ulloa, Spanish general and governor of Louisiana (b. 1716)
- July 9 – Henry Seymour Conway, British general and statesman (b. 1721)
- July 10 – Omar Ali Saifuddin I, Sultan of Brunei since 1740 (b. 1711)
- July 12 – Archduke Alexander Leopold of Austria (b. 1772)
- July 27 – Louis Grégoire Deschamps Destournelles, French politician (b. 1744)
- July 28 – Zebulon Butler, American soldier and politician (b. 1731)
- July 31
  - Basílio da Gama, Portuguese poet and member of the Society of Jesus (b. 1740)
  - Grigory Shelikhov, Russian merchant (b. 1747)
- August 4 – Timothy Ruggles, American-born Tory politician (b. 1711)
- August 5 – William Fleming, Scottish-born physician and 3rd Governor of Virginia (b. 1729)
- August 14
  - George Adams, English optician and writer (b. 1750)
  - Marianne Ehrmann, Swiss-born journalist and novelist (b. 1755)
- August 19 – Friedrich Hartmann Graf, German flautist and composer (b. 1727)
- August 20 – William Jones, Welsh radical and antiquary (b. 1726)
- August 23 – William Bradford, American lawyer and judge (b. 1755)
- August 26 – Alessandro Cagliostro, Italian Freemason (b. 1743)
- August 31 – François-André Danican Philidor, French composer and chess player (b. 1726)
- September 3 – Benjamin Beddome, English Baptist minister and hymnist (b. 1717)
- September 22 – Sayat-Nova, Armenian musician and poet (b. 1712)
- September 30 – George Butt, English chaplain and poet (b. 1741)

=== October–December ===
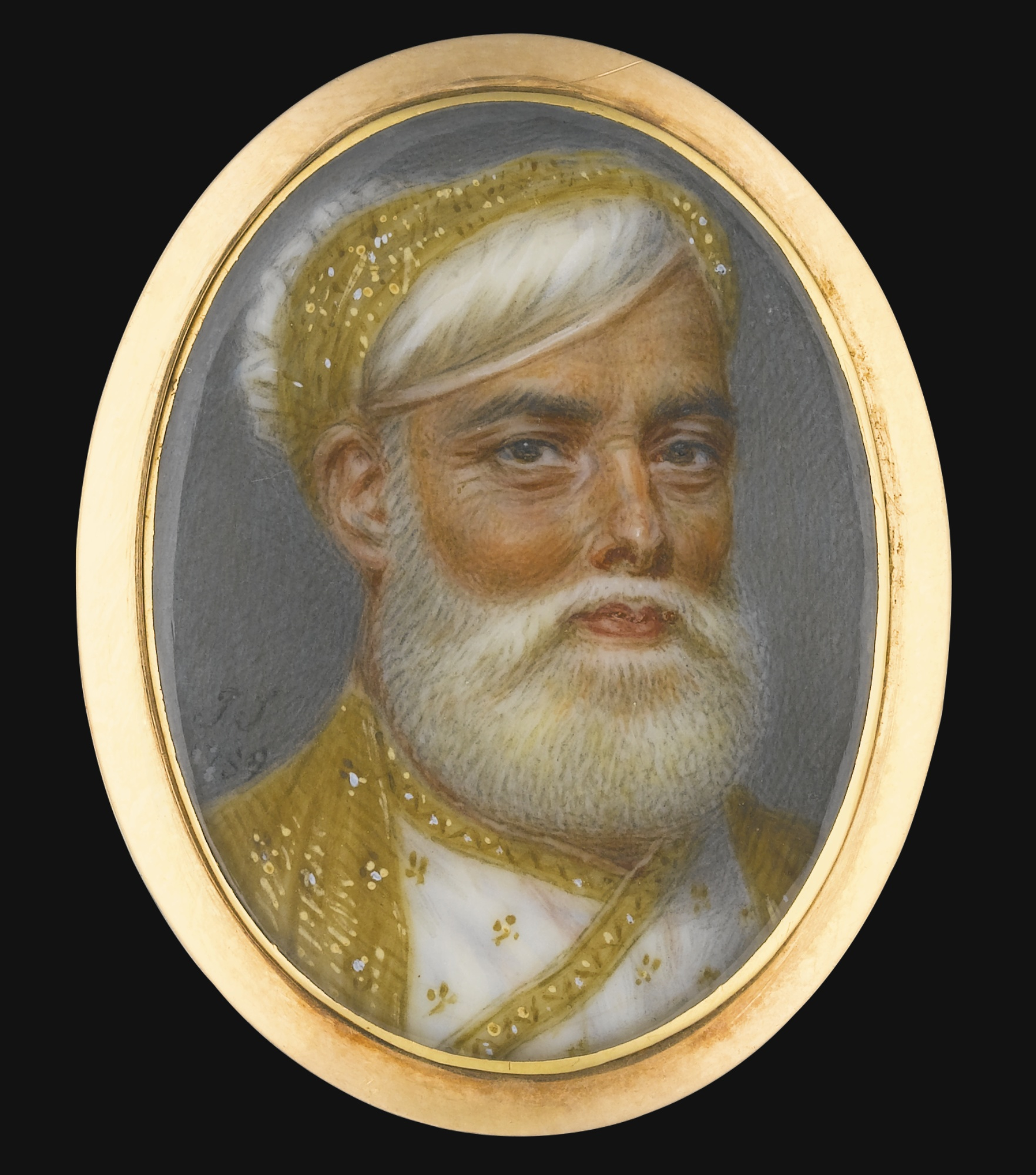
Muhammad Ali Khan Wallajah

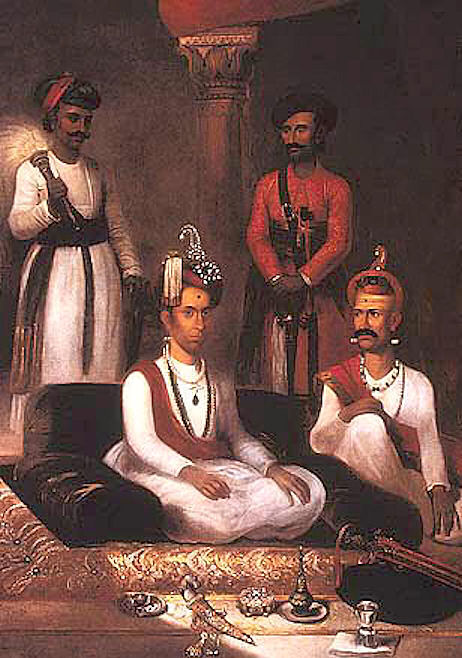
Madhavrao II

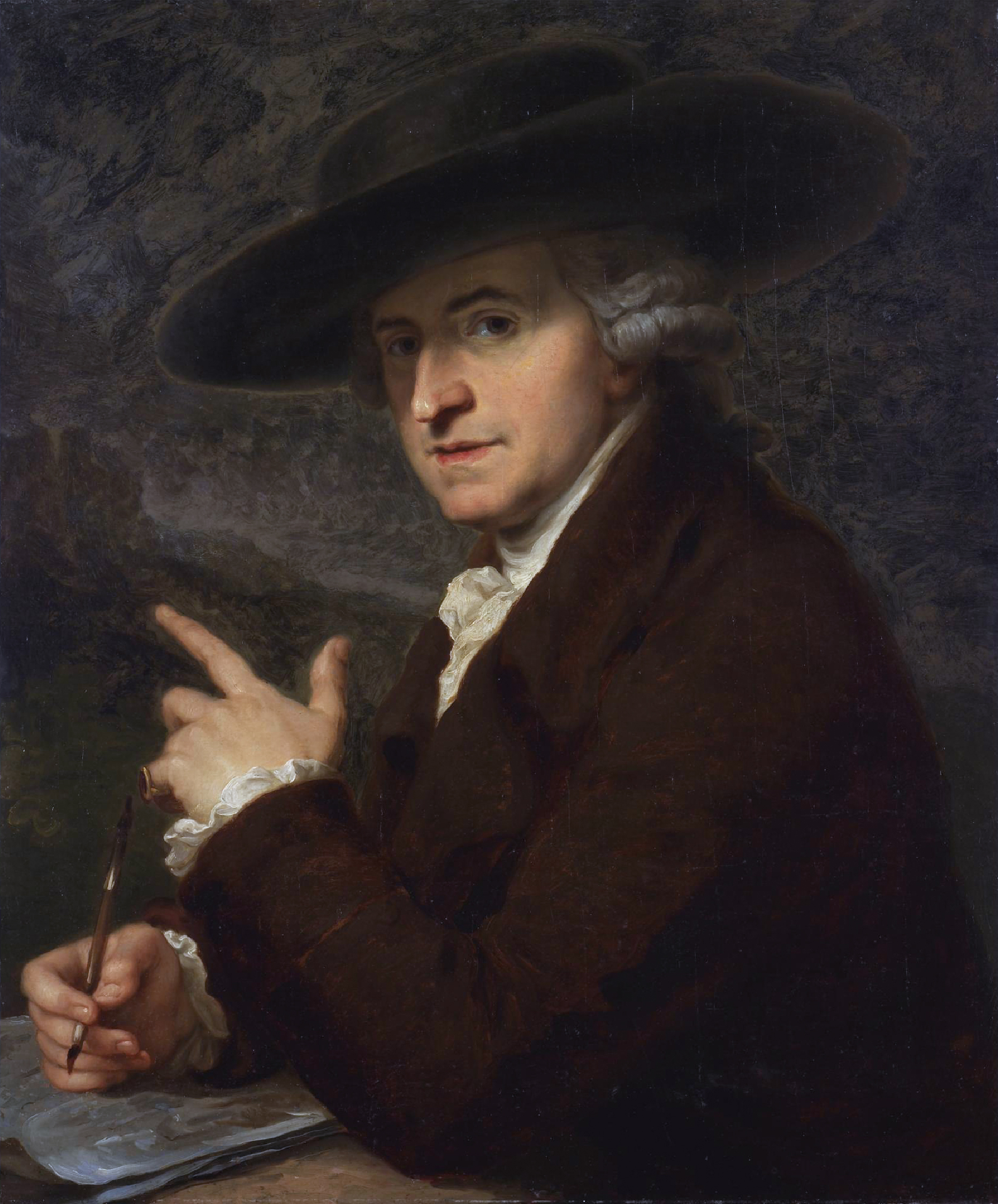
Antonio Zucchi

- October 8 – Andrew Kippis, English nonconformist clergyman and biographer (b. 1725)
- October 10
  - Samuel Fraunces, American restaurateur (b. 1722)
  - Francesco Antonio Zaccaria, Italian theologian and historian (b. 1714)
- October 13
  - William Prescott, American colonel during the Revolutionary War (b. 1726)
  - Muhammad Ali Khan Wallajah, Nawab of Arcot in India (b. 1717)
- October 27 – Madhavrao II, Peshwa of the Maratha Empire in India (b. 1774)
- November 3 – Sir John Hotham, 9th Baronet, English clergyman (b. 1734)
- November 6 – Jiří Antonín Benda, Bohemian composer (b. 1722)
- November 11 – George Dixon, British Royal Navy officer (b. 1748)
- November 15 – Charles-Amédée-Philippe van Loo, French painter (b. 1719)
- November 17 – Samuel Bishop, English poet (b. 1731)
- November 18
  - Antonio Cavallucci, Italian painter (b. 1752)
  - Jan August Cichocki, Polish general (b. 1750)
- December 4 – Prince Eugene of Saxe-Hildburghausen (b. 1730)
- December 10 – John Johnstone, Scottish nabob with the East India Company (b. 1734)
- December 23 – Henry Clinton, British general (b. 1730)
- December 26 – Antonio Zucchi, Italian painter (b. 1726)
- December 28 – Eugenio Espejo, Ecuadorian scientist (b. 1747)

1796

=== January–March ===
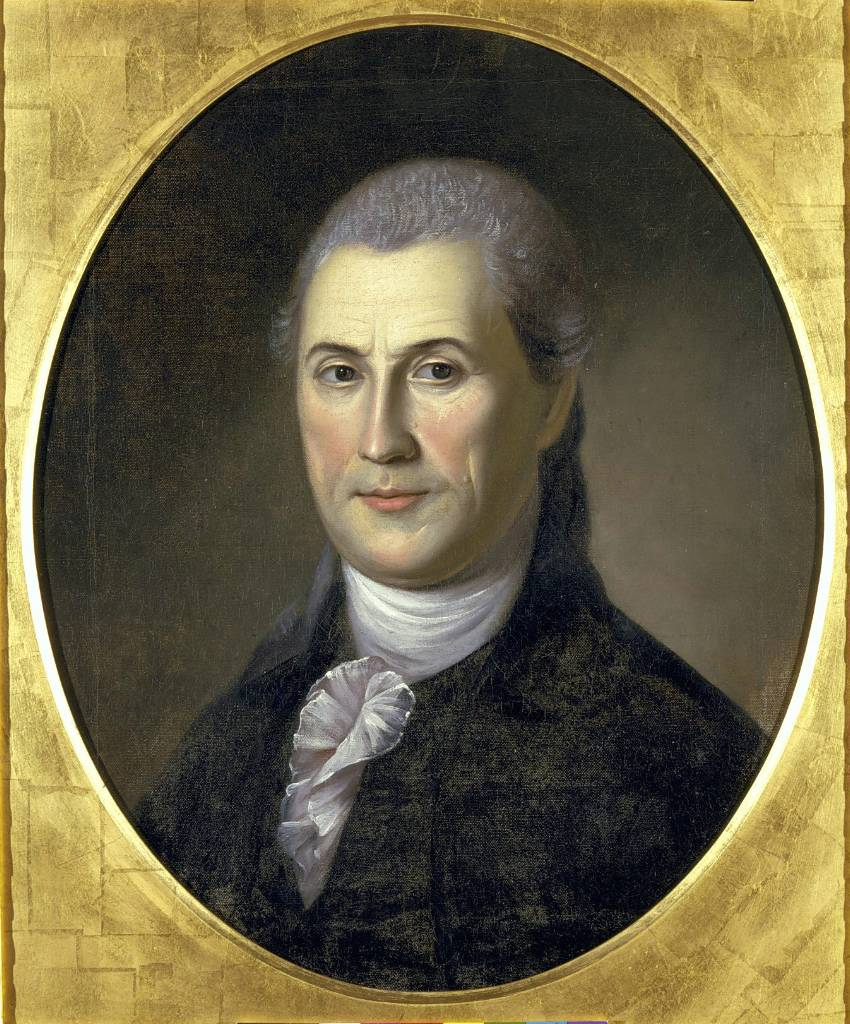
Samuel Huntington

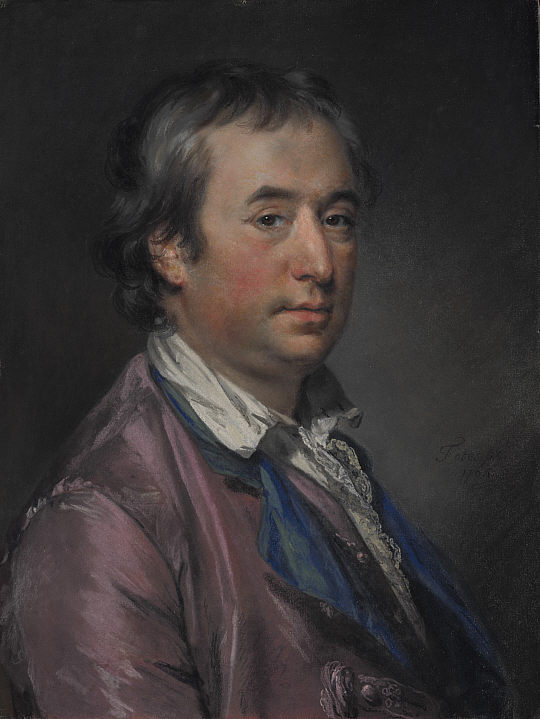
William Chambers (architect)

- January 1
  - Alexandre-Théophile Vandermonde French musician and chemist (b. 1735)
  - Giambattista Vasco, Italian economist (b. 1733)
- January 5 – Samuel Huntington, Connecticut jurist (b. 1731)
- January 5 – Anna Barbara Reinhart, Swiss mathematician (b. 1730)
- January 13 – John Anderson, Scottish scientist and inventor (b. 1726)
- February 7 – Sir Francis Geary, 1st Baronet, officer of the British Royal Navy (b. 1709)
- February 14 – Samuel Pegge, English antiquary (b. 1704)
- February 15 – John Caesar Australian bushranger of African descent (b. 1763)
- February 17 – James Macpherson, Scottish writer (b. 1736)
- February 25 – Jean-Nicolas Stofflet, French royalist general (executed) (b. 1751)
- February 28 – Friedrich Wilhelm Rust, German violinist (b. 1739)
- March 1 – Carl Fredrik Adelcrantz, Swedish architect and civil servant (b. 1716)
- March 3 – Pierre-René Rogue, French Catholic priest, member of the Congregation of the Mission (b. 1758)
- March 6 – Guillaume Thomas François Raynal, French writer, man of letters during the Age of Enlightenment (b. 1713)
- March 10
  - William Chambers, Scottish-Swedish architect (b. 1723)
  - John Forbes, British Royal Navy officer (b. 1714)
- March 12 – Franz Töpsl, Augustinian Canon Regular (b. 1711)
- March 16 – Joseph Gerrald, Scottish political reformer (b. 1763)
- March 19 – Hugh Palliser, British naval officer, administrator (b. 1722)
- March 26 – François de Charette, French Royalist soldier, politician (b. 1763)
- March 30 – Princess Augusta Wilhelmine of Hesse-Darmstadt (b. 1765)

=== April–June ===
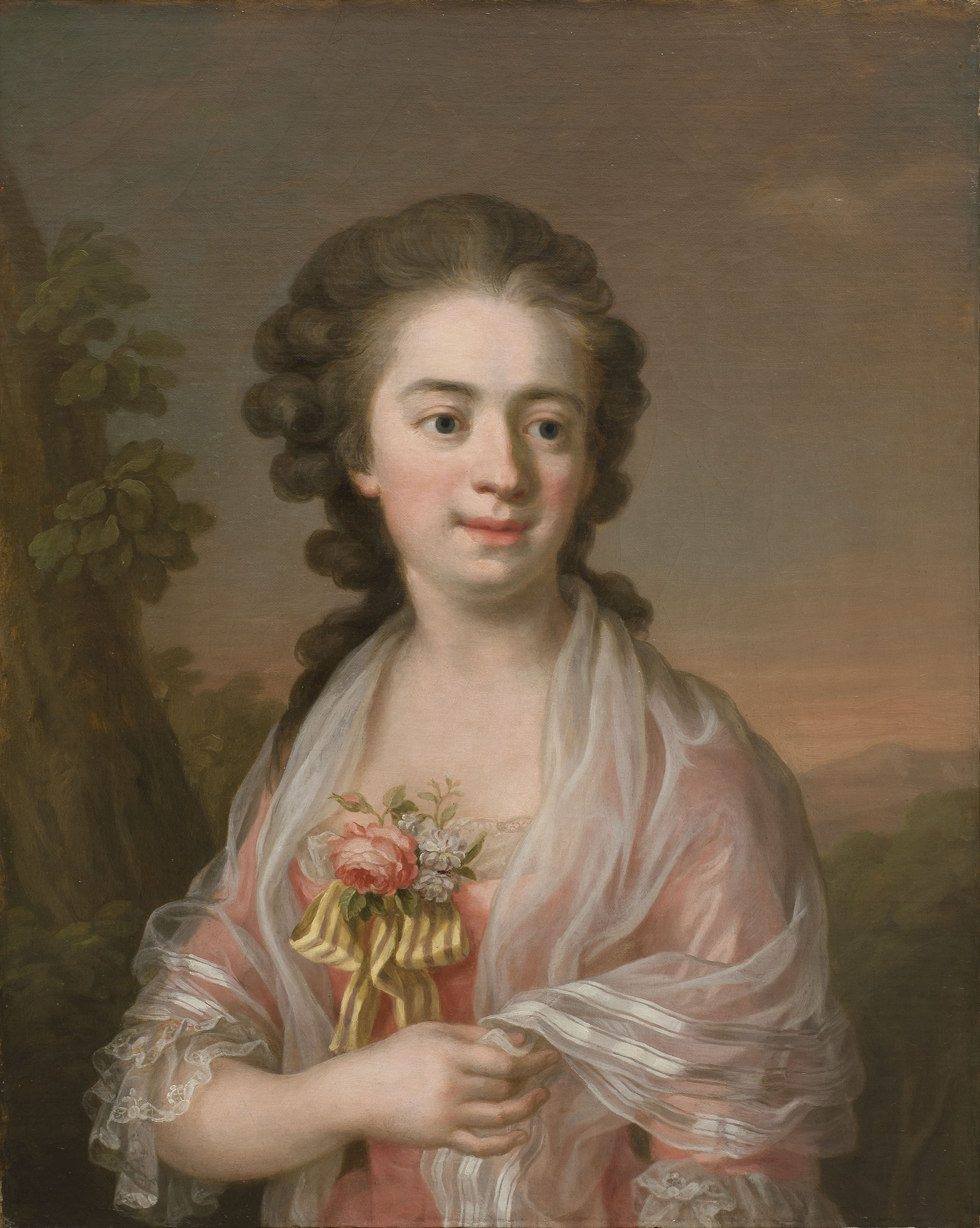
Ulrika Pasch

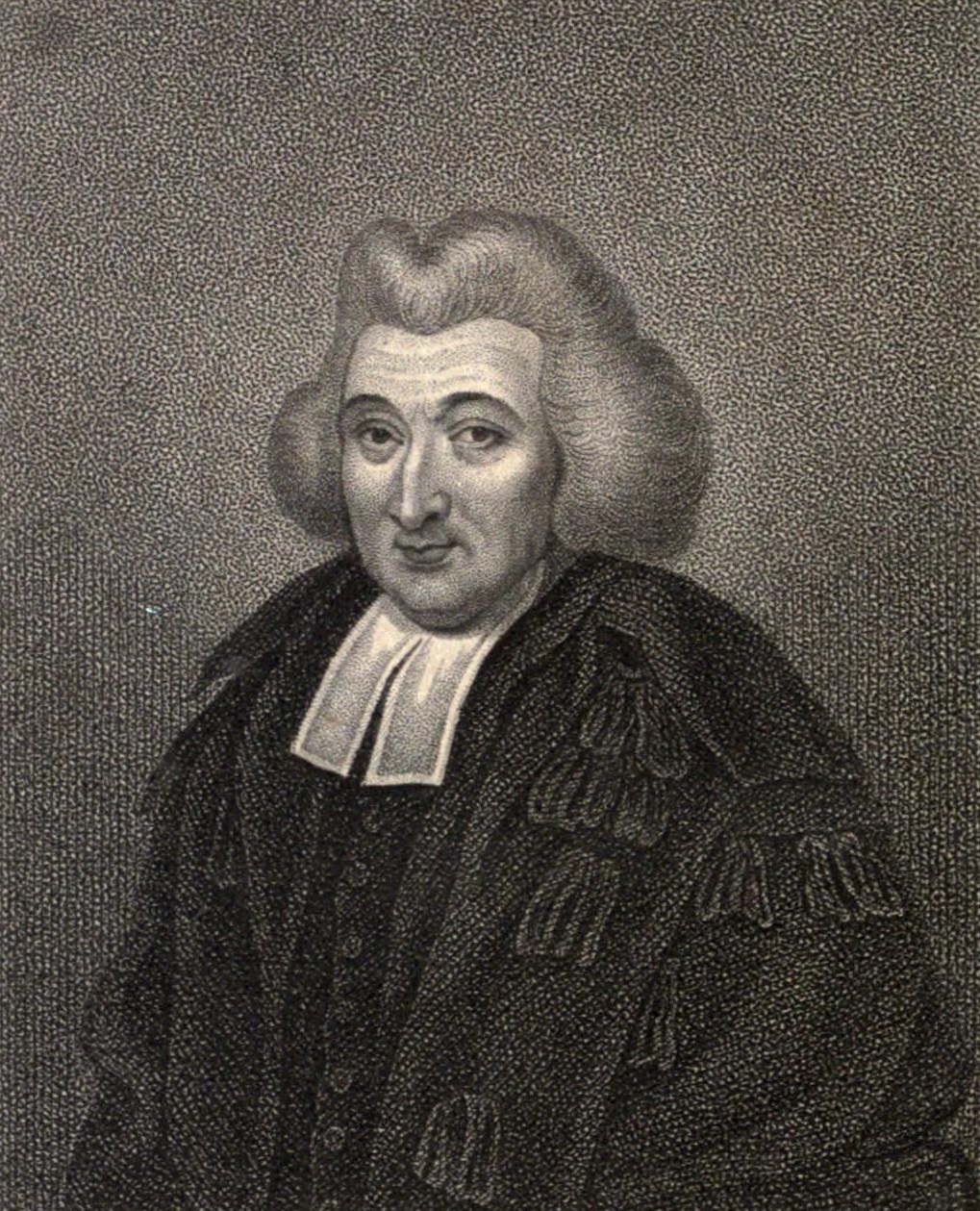
George Campbell

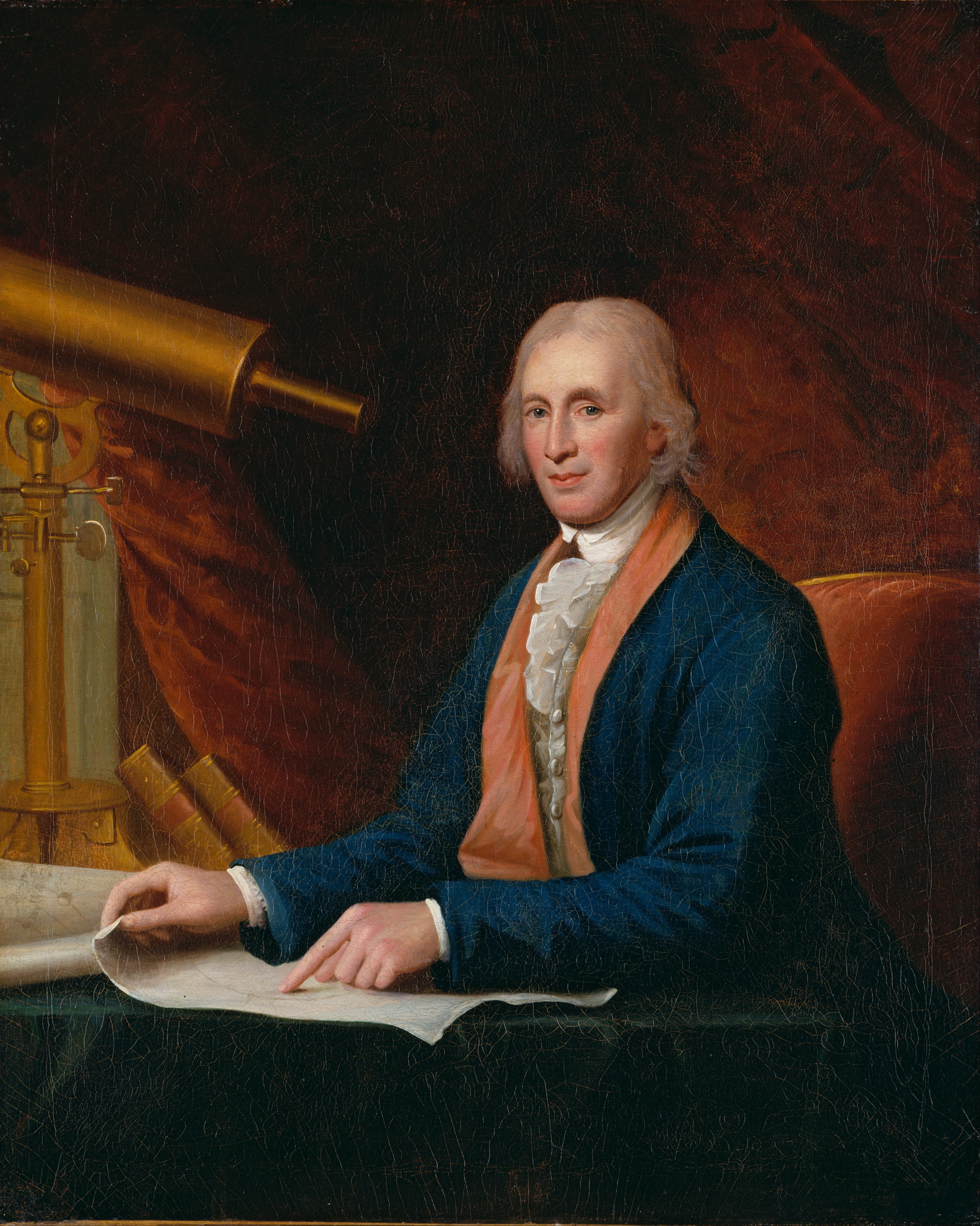
David Rittenhouse

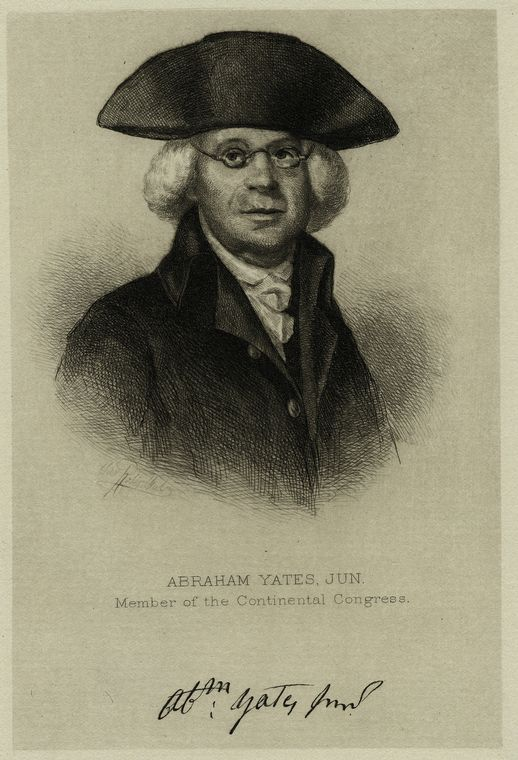
Abraham Yates Jr.

- April 2 – Ulrika Pasch, Swedish rococo painter and miniaturist (b. 1735)
- April 6 – George Campbell, Scottish minister (b. 1719)
- April 9 – Frederick Albert, Prince of Anhalt-Bernburg, German prince of the House of Ascania (b. 1735)
- April 11 – François-Antoine Devaux, French writer (b. 1712)
- April 16 – Molly Brant Mohawk United Empire Loyalist (b. c.1736)
- April 17 – Raja Chamaraja Wodeyar IX of Mysore (b. 1774)
- April 30 – Franciszka Corvin-Krasińska, Polish noblewoman, morganatic wife of Charles of Saxony (b. 1742)
- May 1 – Alexandre Guy Pingré, Catholic priest and scientist (b. 1711)
- May 2 – Juan García Ruiz, bishop of Nueva Segovia (1784–1796) (b. 1728)
- May 6 – Adolph Freiherr Knigge, German writer, Freemason (b. 1752)
- May 12 – Johann Uz, German poet (b. 1720)
- May 13 – John Butler, Loyalist who led an irregular militia unit during the American Revolutionary War (b. 1728)
- May 17 – Gotthard Friedrich Stender, Baltic-German Lutheran priest who played an outstanding role in Latvia's history of culture (b. 1714)
- May 28 – Caroline of Stolberg-Gedern, Princess of Stolberg-Gerdern by birth and by marriage a princess of Hohenlohe-Langenburg (b. 1732)
- May 29 – Carl Fredrik Pechlin, Swedish politician and demagogue (b. 1720)
- June 7 – Elisabetta Caminèr Turra, Venetian writer (b. 1751)
- June 8
  - Jean-Marie Collot d'Herbois, French revolutionary (b. 1749)
  - Felice Giardini, Italian composer, violinist (b. 1716)
- June 9 – José Álvarez de Toledo, Duke of Alba, patron of the artist Francisco Goya (b. 1756)
- June 11
  - Nathaniel Gorham, Massachusetts politician, merchant (b. 1738)
  - Samuel Whitbread, English brewer, politician (b. 1720)
- June 14
  - Charles Albert II, Prince of Hohenlohe-Waldenburg-Schillingsfürst, 3rd Prince of Hohenlohe-Waldenburg-Schillingsfürst from 1793 to 1796 (b. 1742)
  - John Laforey, British naval officer (b. 1729)
- June 16
  - Charles of Saxony, Duke of Courland, German prince from the House of Wettin and Duke of Courland (b. 1733)
  - Walter Stewart, Irish-born American general during the American Revolutionary War (b. 1756)
- June 19 – Consider Tiffany, British loyalist (b. 1732)
- June 21 – Richard Gridley, American Revolutionary soldier (b. 1710)
- June 25 – Johann Philipp Siebenkees, German philosopher (b. 1759)
- June 26 – David Rittenhouse, American astronomer, inventor, mathematician, surveyor, scientific instrument craftsman and public official (b. 1732)
- June 28 – Antonio Maria Lorgna, Italian mathematician (b. 1735)
- June 30 – Abraham Yates Jr., American lawyer, civil servant from Albany (b. 1724)

=== July–September ===
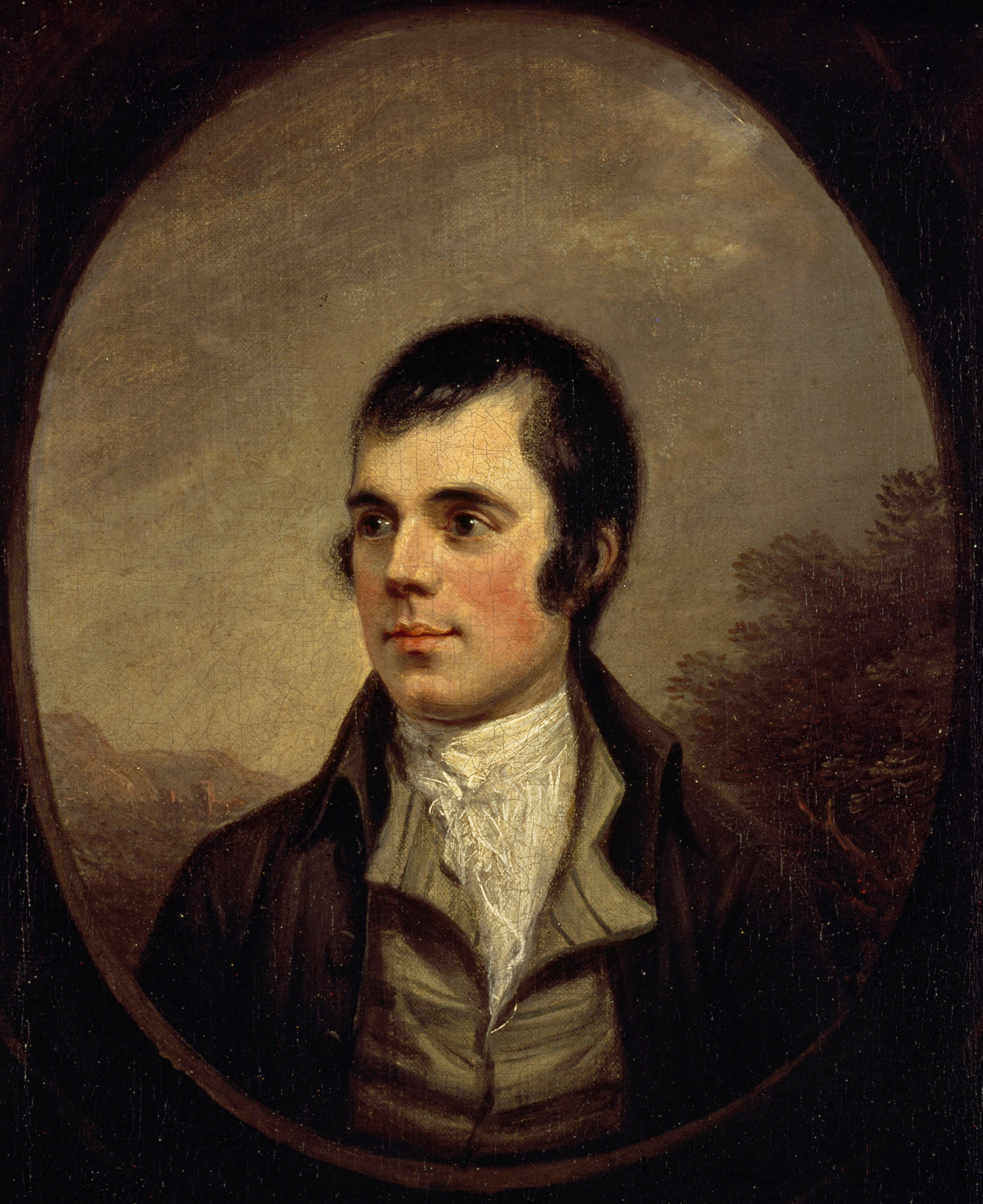
Robert Burns

- July 8
  - John Mills, American soldier, officer (b. 1754)
  - Adam Naruszewicz, Polish-Lithuanian nobleman (b. 1733)
- July 16
  - William Gerard Hamilton, English statesman (b. 1729)
  - George Howard, British field marshal (b. 1718)
- July 17 – John Christopher Hartwick, Lutheran minister in Colonial America, founder of Hartwick College (b. 1714)
- July 20 – John Houstoun, American lawyer, statesman from Savannah (b. 1744)
- July 21
  - Robert Burns, Scottish poet (b. 1759)
  - Philip Carteret, British naval officer, explorer in two circumnavigation expeditions (b. 1733)
- August 1
  - Robert Pigot, 2nd Baronet, British Army officer during the American Revolutionary War (b. 1720)
  - Sir Robert Pigot, 2nd Baronet, British army officer (b. 1720)
- August 2 – Sarah Osborn, American writer (b. 1714)
- August 10 – Ignaz Anton von Indermauer, Austrian nobleman from Tyrol, Landvögte and Kreishauptmann of Vorarlberg (b. 1759)
- August 12
  - Richard Beckford, English member of parliament
  - Mary Ann Wrighten, English singer, actress (b. 1751)
- August 25 – Isaac Parsons, American planter (b. 1752)
- August 31 – John McKinly, American physician, politician from Wilmington (b. 1721)
- September 1 – David Murray, 2nd Earl of Mansfield (b. 1727)
- September 7 – Henri François Lambert, brigadier general of the French revolutionary army (b. 1760)
- September 11 – Anna Barbara Gignoux, German industrialist (b. 1725)
- September 20
  - Juan José Elhuyar, Spanish chemist, mineralogist (b. 1754)
  - Christian Febiger, American Revolutionary War commander (b. 1749)
- September 21 – François Séverin Marceau-Desgraviers, French revolutionary general (killed in battle) (b. 1769)
- September 27 – Jonathan Sewall, last British attorney general of Massachusetts (b. 1729)
- September 29 – Henry Hamilton, Anglo-Irish soldier, government official of the British Empire (b. c. 1734)

=== October–December ===
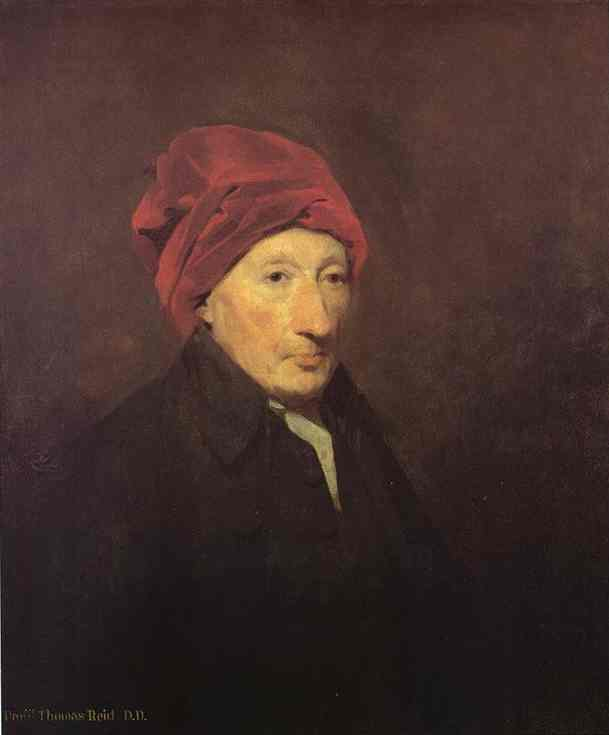
Thomas Reid

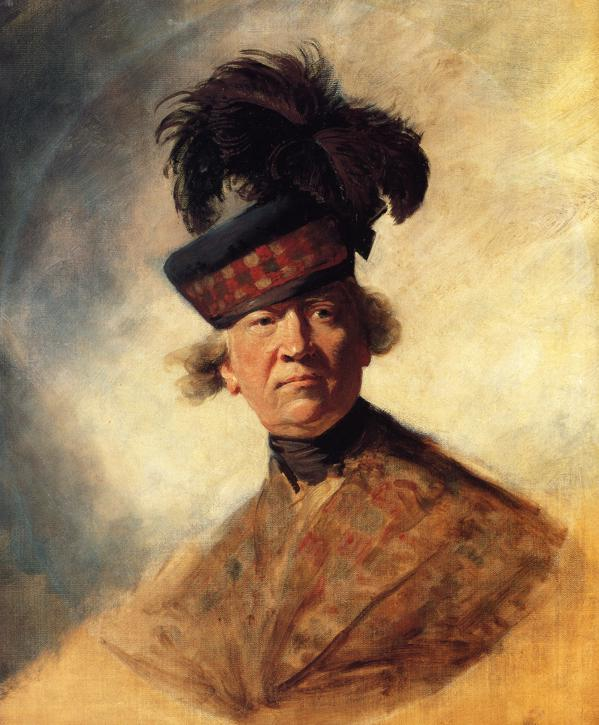
Archibald Montgomerie, 11th Earl of Eglinton

- October 7 – Thomas Reid, religiously trained Scottish philosopher (b. 1710)
- October 10 – Juliana Maria of Brunswick-Wolfenbüttel (b. 1729)
- October 16
  - Antoine-Joseph Pernety, French writer (b. 1716)
  - Victor Amadeus III, King of Sardinia (b. 1726)
- October 30 – Archibald Montgomerie, 11th Earl of Eglinton, Scottish general (b. 1726)
- November 8 – King Ang Eng of Cambodia (b. 1773)
- November 17 – Empress Catherine II of Russia (b. 1729)
- November 19 – Thomas Thynne, 1st Marquess of Bath (b. 1734)
- December 2 – Jean Charles Abbatucci, French general during the War of the First Coalition (b. 1771)
- December 5 – George Mason V, American planter, businessman (b. 1753)
- December 10 – Israel Jacobs, colonial Pennsylvania Legislator and United States Representative from Pennsylvania (b. 1726)
- December 12 – William Buller, English clergyman (b. 1735)
- December 15 – Anthony Wayne, United States Army officer, statesman, and member of the United States House of Representatives (b. 1745)
- December 16 – Johann Daniel Titius, German astronomer, professor at Wittenberg (b. 1729)
- December 18 – Lord John Cavendish, British nobleman, statesman (b. 1732)
- December 19 – Pyotr Rumyantsev, Russian general (b. 1725)
- December 25
  - Bengt Anders Euphrasén, Swedish botanist (b. 1756)
  - Velu Nachiyar, Indian queen of Sivaganga estate (1760–1790) (b. 1730)
- December 28 – Prince Louis Charles of Prussia, son of Frederick William II of Prussia and Frederika Louisa of Hesse-Darmstadt (b. 1773)

1797

=== January–March ===
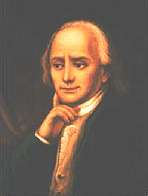
Francis Lightfoot Lee

- January 11 – Francis Lightfoot Lee, member of the House of Burgesses in the Colony of Virginia (b. 1734)
- January 13 – Elisabeth Christine of Brunswick-Wolfenbüttel-Bevern, queen consort of Prussia (b. 1715)
- January 19 – David Graeme, British Army general (b. 1716)
- January 26 – Antão de Almada, 12th Count of Avranches (b. 1718)
- January 30 – John Glover, American military general, fisherman and merchant (b. 1732)
- February 1 – James Duane, American lawyer (b. 1733)
- February 8 – Princess Joséphine of Lorraine (b. 1753)
- February 11 – Antoine Dauvergne, French composer (b. 1713)
- February 13 – Sir Robert Burdett, 4th Baronet, British politician and member of the English gentry (b. 1716)
- February 17 – Maria Anna Sophia of Saxony, daughter of King Augustus III of Poland (b. 1728)
- February 21 – John Parkhurst, English academic (b. 1728)
- February 22 – Karl Friedrich Hieronymus Freiherr von Münchhausen, German officer and adventurer (b. 1720)
- March 2 – Horace Walpole, English politician and writer (b. 1717)
- March 5 – Empress Xiaoshurui, first Empress Consort of the Jiaqing Emperor of the Qing Dynasty (b. 1760)
- March 7
  - John Gabriel Stedman, British–Dutch colonial soldier and author (b. 1744)
  - Johann Heinrich Samuel Formey, German writer (b. 1711)
- March 16 – Cristina Roccati, Italian scholar in physics (b. 1732)
- March 17 – Daniel Dulany the Younger, Maryland Loyalist politician (b. 1722)
- March 26 – James Hutton, Scottish geologist (b. 1726)
- March 30 – Pierre Jean Van Stabel, French rear-admiral (b. 1744)
- March 31
  - Olaudah Equiano, Nigerian ex-slave, abolitionist (b. c. 1746)
  - Elizabeth Washington Lewis, younger sister of George Washington, the only sister to live to adulthood (b. 1733)

=== April–June ===
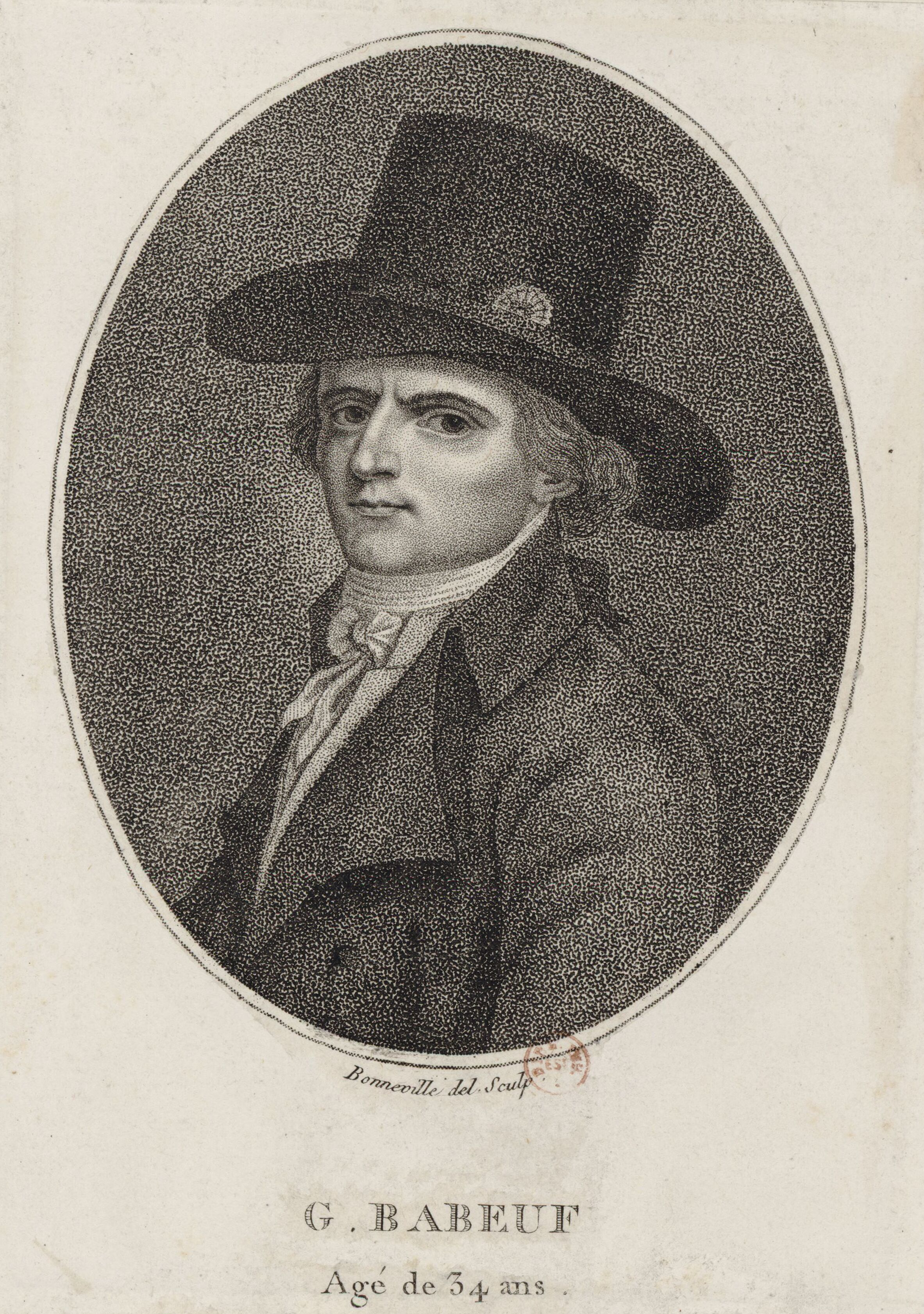
François-Noël Babeuf

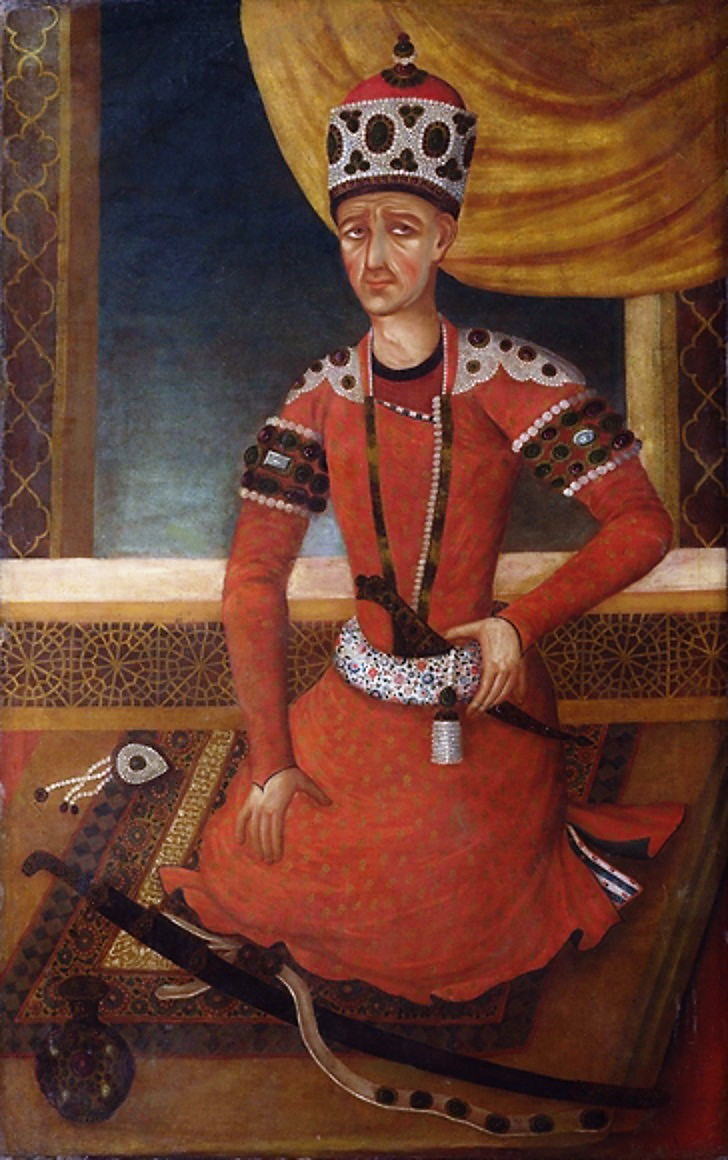
Agha Mohammad Khan Qajar

- April 4 – Pierre-François Berruer, French sculptor (b. 1733)
- April 17 – Susanna Boylston, prominent early-American socialite (b. 1708)
- April 27 – Henry Louis, Prince of Nassau-Saarbrücken, titular prince of Nassau-Saarbrücken (b. 1768)
- April 29 – Elizabeth Ryves, Irish writer, translator (b. 1750)
- May 7 – Jedediah Strutt, English hosier and cotton spinner from Belper (b. 1726)
- May 14 – Giovanni Fagnano, Italian churchman and mathematician (b. 1715)
- May 17 – Michel-Jean Sedaine, French dramatist (b. 1719)
- May 25
  - Andrew Elliot, acting colonial governor of the Province of New York (b. 1728)
  - John Griffin, 4th Baron Howard de Walden, British field marshal (b. 1719)
- May 27
  - François-Noël Babeuf, French revolutionary leader (executed) (b. 1760)
  - Augustin Alexandre Darthé, French revolutionary leader (executed) (b. 1769)
- June 15 – Christen Friis Rottbøll, Danish physician, botanist and pupil of Carolus Linnaeus (b. 1727)
- June 17
  - Agha Mohammad Khan Qajar, founder of the Qajar dynasty of Iran (b. 1742)
  - Mohammad Khan Qajar, Iranian king (b. 1742)
- June 21 – Andreas Peter Bernstorff, Danish statesman, politician (b. 1735)
- June 24 – Bahadur Shah of Nepal, younger son of King Prithvi Narayan Shah (1723–1775) of modern Nepal (b. 1757)
- June 30
  - Welbore Ellis Doyle, third Military Governor of British Ceylon (b. 1758)
  - Richard Parker, English sailor executed for his role as president of the so-called "Floating Republic" (b. 1767)

=== July–September ===
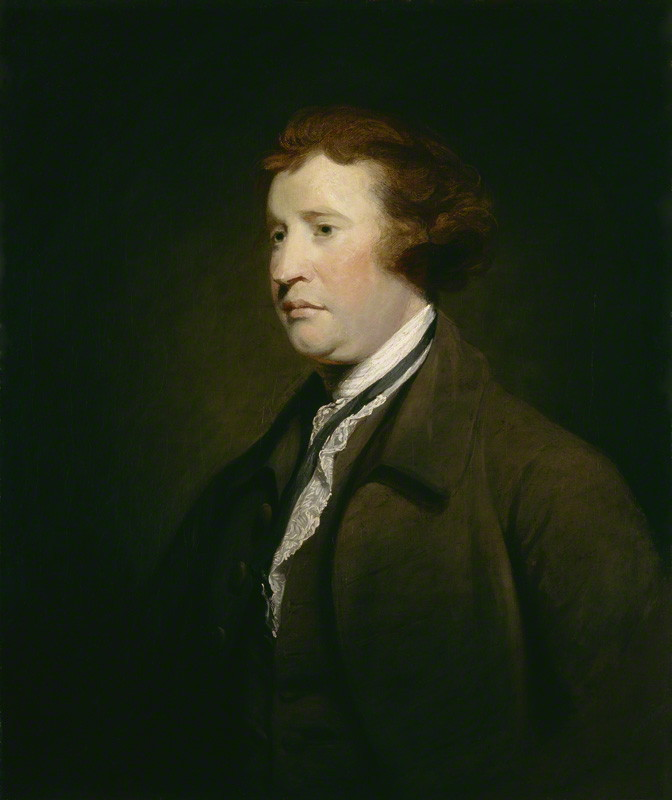
Edmund Burke

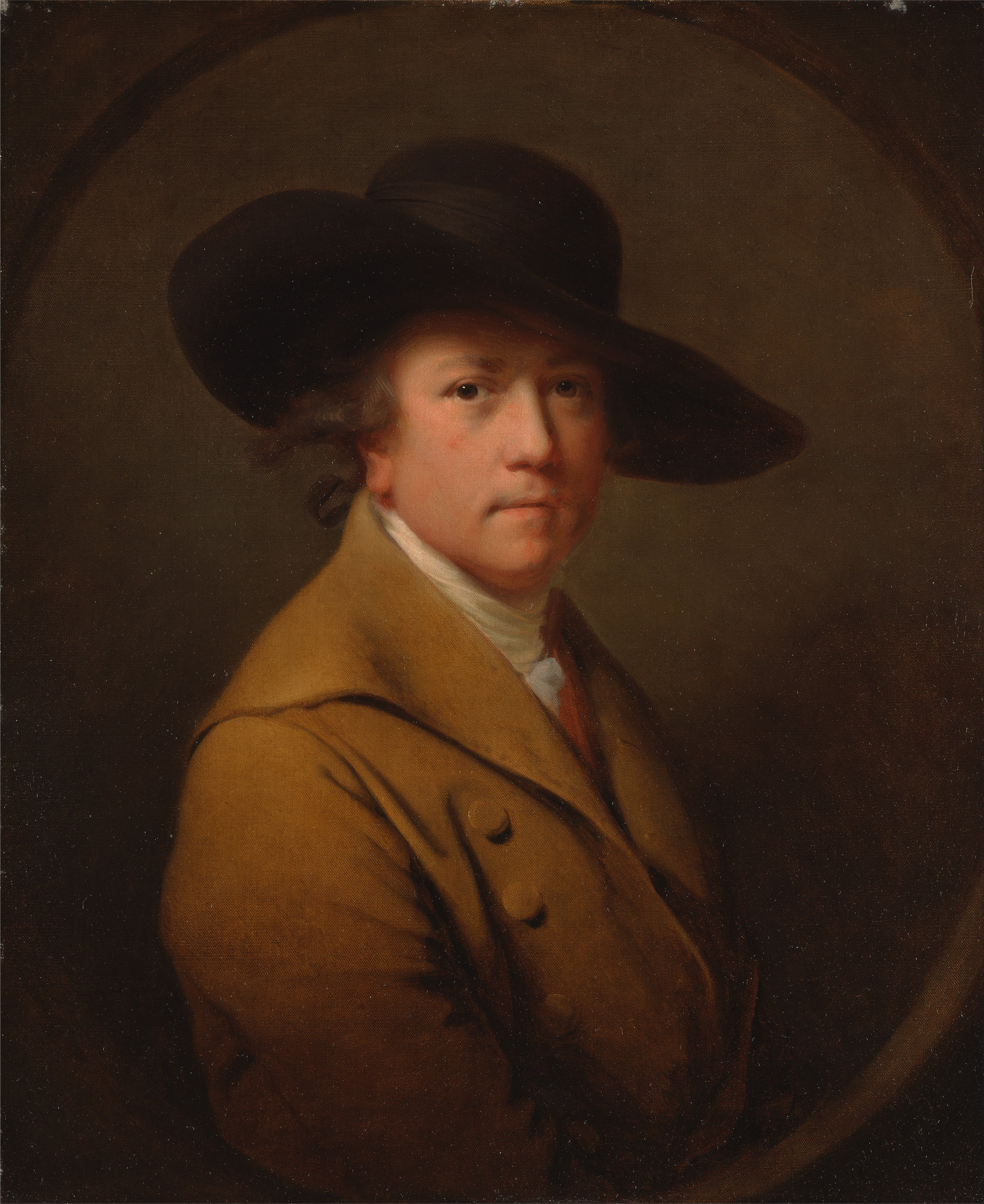
Joseph Wright of Derby

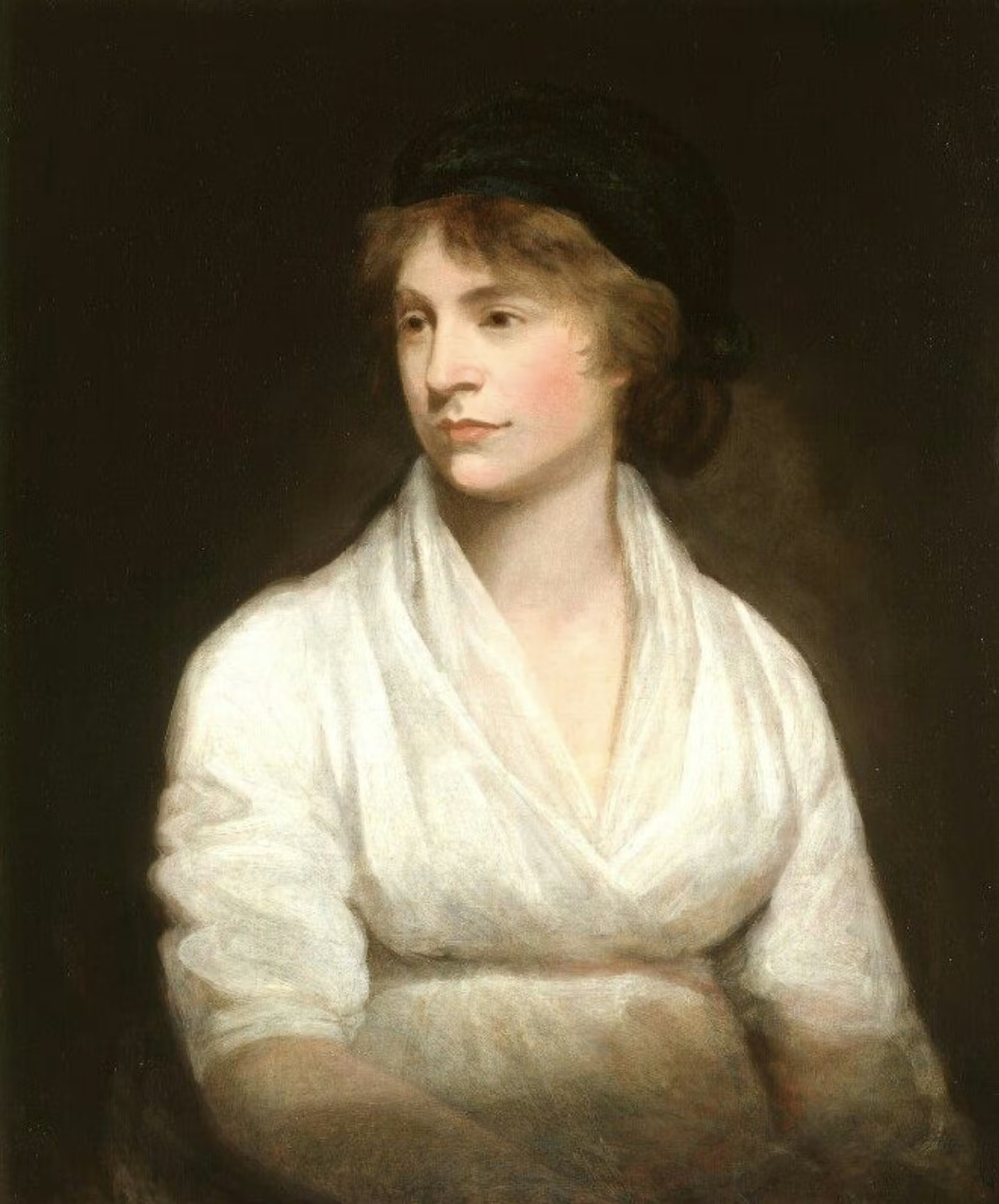
Mary Wollstonecraft

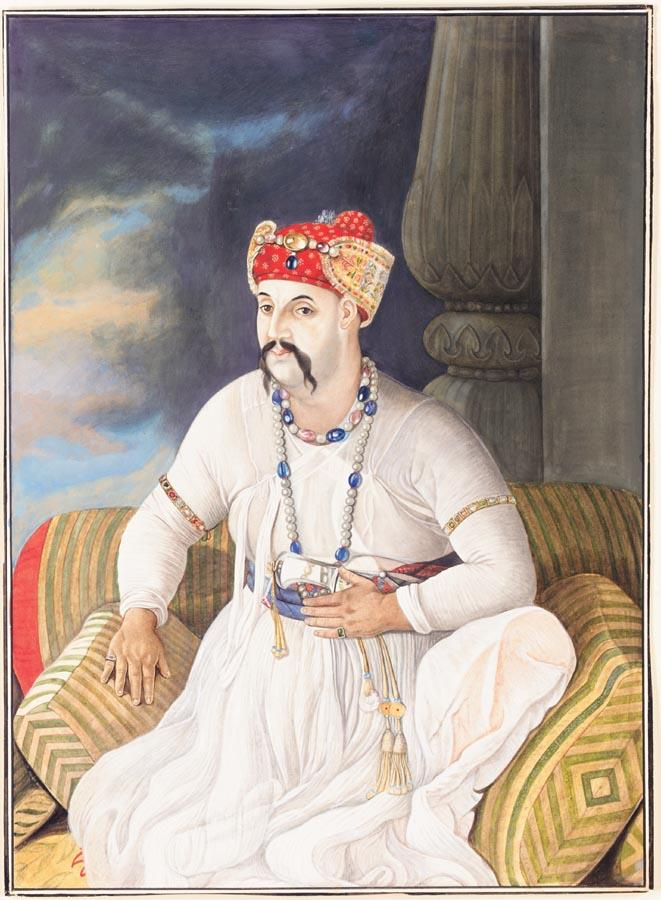
Asaf-ud-Daula

- July 9 – Edmund Burke, Irish philosopher (b. 1723)
- July 11 – Ienăchiță Văcărescu, Wallachian writer (b. 1740)
- July 12 – Peter Bonnevaux, fourth Military Governor of British Ceylon, third General Officer Commanding (b. 1752)
- July 14 – Emmanuel de Rohan-Polduc, member of the wealthy and influential Rohan family of France (b. 1725)
- July 25
  - Richard Bowen, officer of the Royal Navy during the American War of Independence and the French Revolutionary Wars (b. 1761)
  - George Thorp, officer of the British Royal Navy during the French Revolutionary Wars (b. 1777)
- July 29 – John Weatherhead, officer of the British Royal Navy (b. 1775)
- August 3
  - August 3 – Jeffrey Amherst, 1st Baron Amherst, British soldier and conqueror of Quebec (b. 1717)
  - James Davenport, American lawyer (b. 1758)
- August 6 – James Pettit Andrews, English historian, antiquary (b. 1737)
- August 10 – Alexei Senyavin, Russian admiral (b. 1716)
- August 22 – Dagobert Sigmund von Wurmser, Alsatian-born Austrian general (b. 1724)
- August 25 – Thomas Chittenden, first governor of the state of Vermont (b. 1730)
- August 29 – Joseph Wright of Derby, English landscape and portrait painter (b. 1734)
- September 4 – Sir William Ashburnham, 4th Baronet, Church of England clergyman, baronet (b. 1710)
- September 10 – Mary Wollstonecraft, English feminist author (b. 1759)
- September 12 – David Forman, brigadier general of New Jersey militia (b. 1745)
- September 19
  - Samuel Enderby, English whale oil merchant known for sponsoring Arctic exploration (b. 1719)
  - Lazare Hoche, French soldier who rose to be general of the Revolutionary army (b. 1768)
- September 21
  - Asaf-ud-Daula, nawab wazir of Oudh (b. 1748)
  - Hugh Pigot, British Royal Navy officer (b. 1769)
- September 25 – John Baughan, English carpenter, thief and transportee to Australia (b. 1754)
- September 30 – Gunning Bedford Sr., American lawyer and politician from New Castle (b. 1742)

=== October–December ===
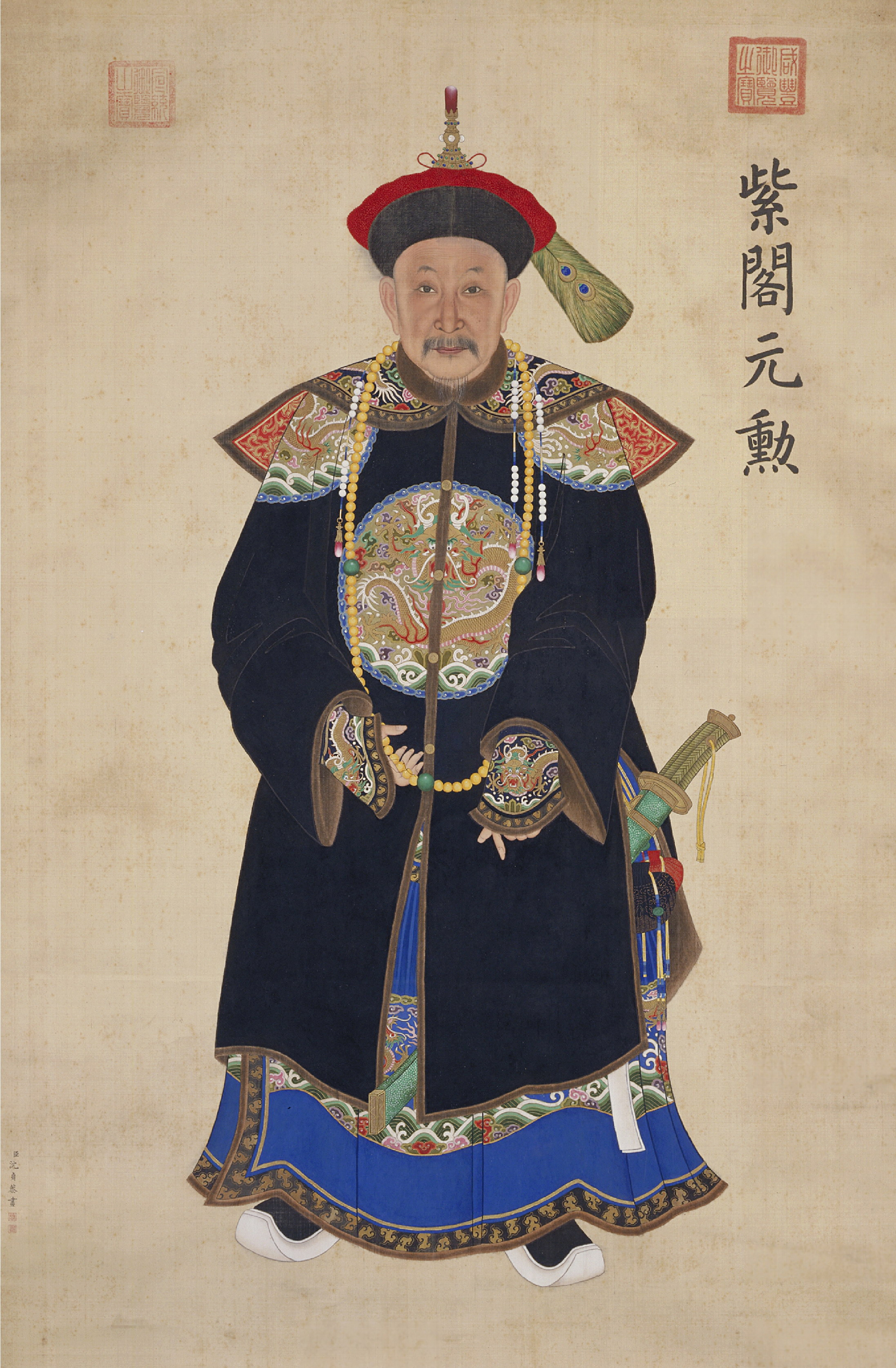
Agui

- October 9 – Vilna Gaon, Lithuanian rabbi (b. 1720)
- October 10
  - Agui, Manchu noble general for the Qing dynasty (b. 1717)
  - Carter Braxton, signer of the United States Declaration of Independence, merchant, planter, Virginia politician (b. 1736)
- October 14 – William Orr, member of the United Irishmen (executed) (b. 1766)
- October 17 – Jean-François Hubert, bishop of Quebec (b. 1739)
- October 20 – William Cooke, English cleric, academic (b. 1711)
- November 14 – Ivan Shuvalov, founder of Moscow University (b. 1727)
- November 16 – King Frederick William II of Prussia (b. 1744)
- November 18 – Jacques-Alexandre Laffon de Ladebat, French shipbuilder, merchant (b. 1719)
- November 26 – Andrew Adams, American lawyer (b. 1736)
- November 27 – Johann Baptist Wendling, Alsatian-born flute player, composer of the Mannheim School (b. 1723)
- November 29 – Samuel Langdon, American Congregational clergyman, President of Harvard University (b. 1723)
- December 1 – Oliver Wolcott, American politician (b. 1726)
- December 11 – Richard Brocklesby, English physician (b. 1722)
- December 13 – Louis Legendre, French politician of the Revolution period (b. 1752)
- December 23
  - Frederick II Eugene, Duke of Württemberg (b. 1732)
  - Solomon Southwick, Newport, Rhode Island printer, newspaper publisher (b. 1731)
- December 26 – John Wilkes, English radical (b. 1725)
- December 30 – David Martin, British painter, engraver (b. 1737)
- Date unknown
  - Joseph Ferrers, English Carmelite friar.
  - Wang Zhenyi, Chinese astronomer

1798

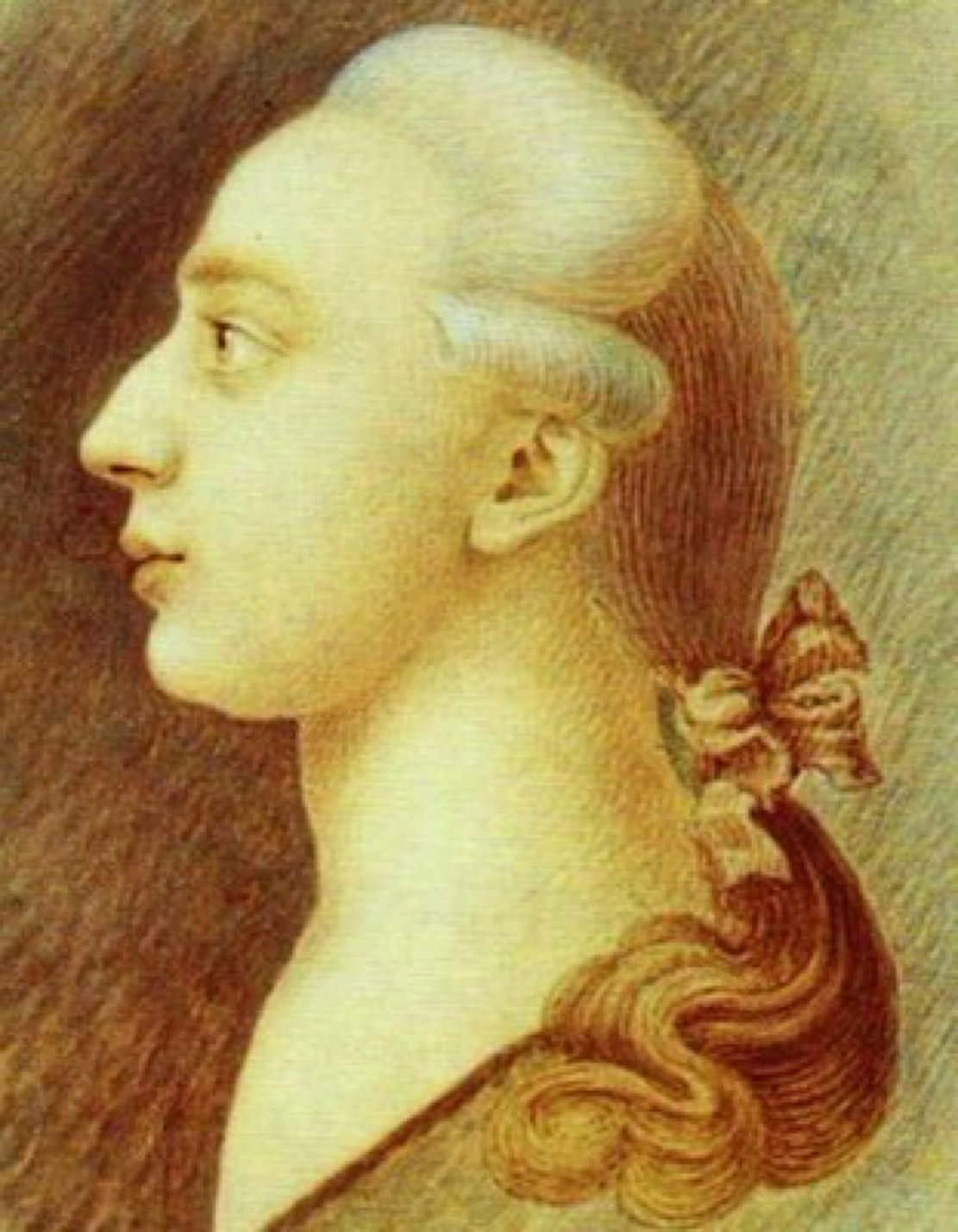
Giacomo Casanova

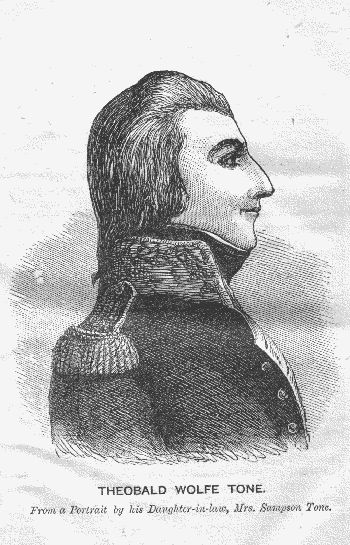
Wolfe Tone

- January 3 – Carlo Aurelio Widmann, Venetian nobleman and admiral (b. 1750)
- January 22 – Lewis Morris, American landowner and developer, signer of the United States Declaration of Independence (b. 1726)
- February 12 – Stanisław August Poniatowski, deposed last King of Poland and Grand Duke of Lithuania (b. 1732)
- February 25 – Louis Jules Mancini Mazarini, French diplomat, writer (b. 1716)
- March 22 – Justin Morgan, American horse breeder and composer (b. 1747)
- March 25 – General Michel Joachim Marie Raymond, French leader of the army of the Nizam of Hyderabad (poisoned) (b. 1755)
- April – Gideon Morris, trans-Appalachian pioneer (b. 1756)
- April 11 – Karl Wilhelm Ramler, German poet (b. 1725)
- April 12 – Madeleine de Puisieux, French writer, active feminist (b. 1720)
- April 14 – Henry Mowat, Scottish-born British Royal Navy officer (b. 1734)
- April 29 – Nikolaus Poda von Neuhaus, German entomologist (b. 1723)
- May 10 – George Vancouver, British Royal Navy officer, explorer (Vancouver, Canada is named after him) (b. 1757)
- May 19 – William Byron, 5th Baron Byron, English dueler (b. 1722)
- June – Betsy Gray, Irish rebel heroine
- June 4 – Giacomo Casanova, Italian adventurer, writer (b. 1725)
- June 21 – John Kelly of Killanne, Irish republican
- June 25 – Thomas Sandby, English cartographer, architect (b. 1721)
- June 29 – Catharina Mulder, Dutch orangist (b. 1723)
- July 17 – Henry Joy McCracken, Irish republican
- July 21 – François Sébastien Charles Joseph de Croix, Count of Clerfayt, Austrian field marshal (b. 1733)
- August 1 – François-Paul Brueys d'Aigalliers, French admiral (killed in battle) (b. 1753)
- August 11 – Joshua Clayton, American politician (b. 1744)
- August 18 – John Lewis Gervais, American revolutionary and politician (b. 1741)
- August 21 – James Wilson, American politician (b. 1742)
- August 24 – Thomas Alcock, English clergyman (b. 1709)
- August 25 – Mikiel'Ang Grima, Maltese surgeon (b. 1731)
- September 21 – George Read, American lawyer, signer of the Declaration of Independence (b. 1733)
- November 5 – John Zephaniah Holwell, British surgeon (b. 1711)
- November 15 – Angelo Maria Amorevoli, Italian operatic tenor (b. 1716)
- November 19 – Wolfe Tone, Irish republican (b. 1737)
- November 21 – Gabriel Lenkiewicz, Belarusian Temporary Vicar General of the Society of Jesus (b. 1722)
- December 4 – Luigi Galvani, Italian physicist (b. 1737)
- December 16 – Thomas Pennant, Welsh naturalist (b. 1726)

1799

=== January–June ===
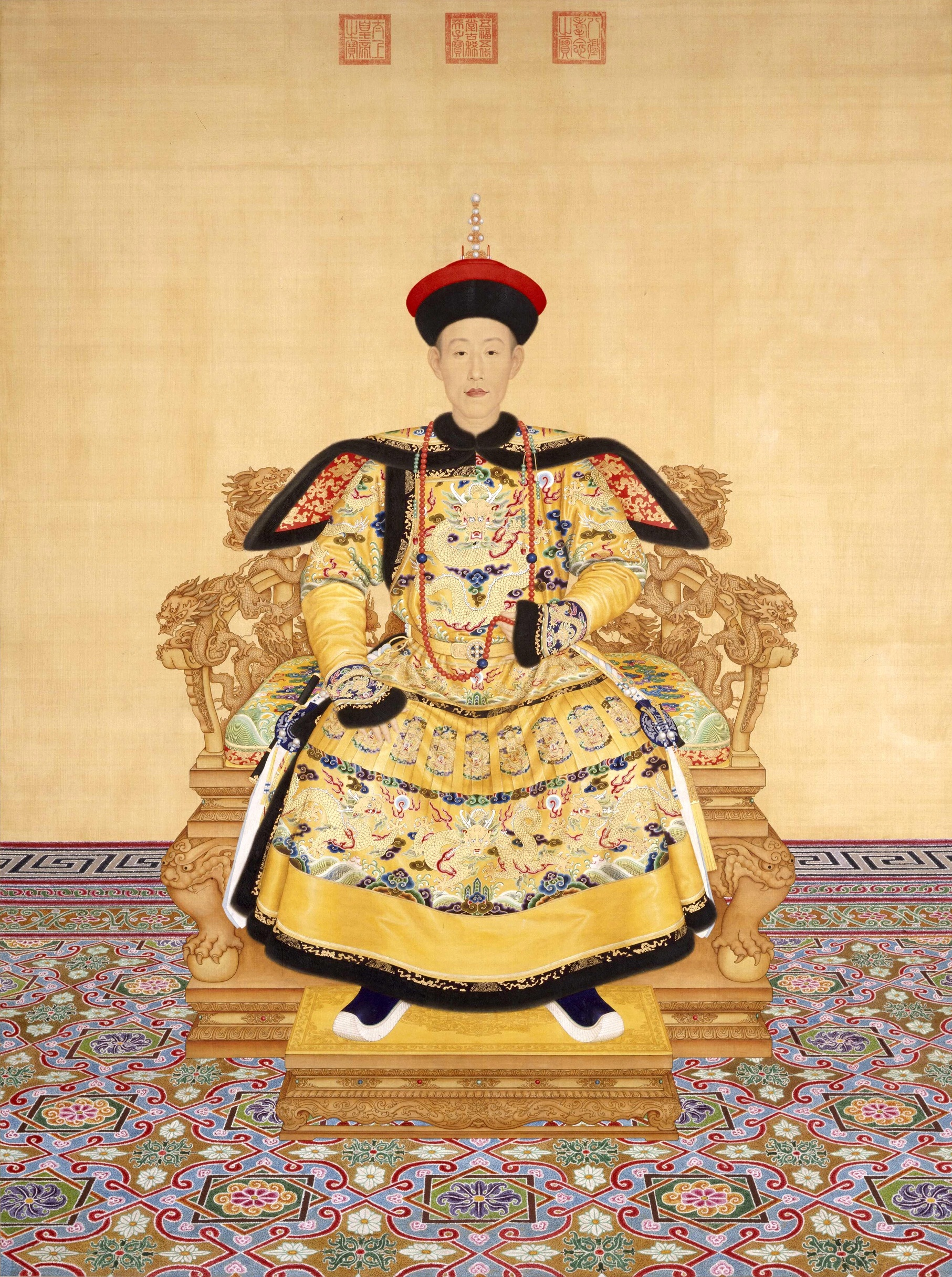
Qianlong Emperor

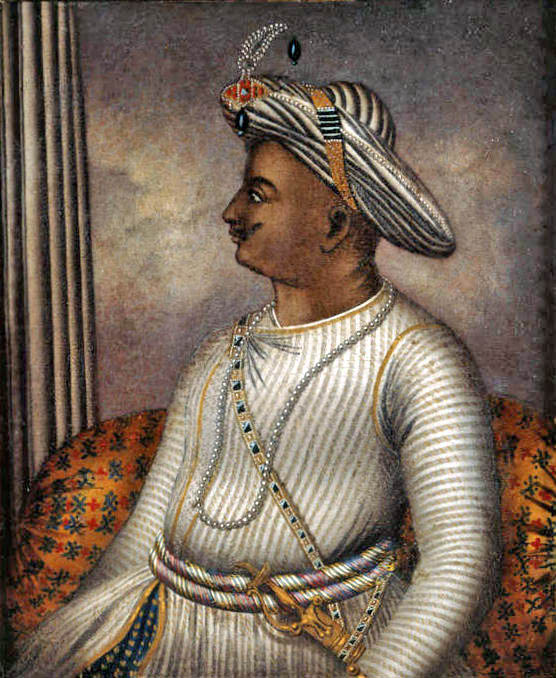
Tipu Sultan

- January 9 – Maria Gaetana Agnesi, Italian mathematician (b. 1718)
- January 18 – Heinrich Johann Nepomuk von Crantz, Luxembourgish botanist (b. 1722)
- January 22 – Horace-Bénédict de Saussure, Swiss aristocrat, alpinist (b. 1740)
- January 26 – Gabriel Christie (British Army officer), British Army general (b. 1722)
- February 6 – Étienne-Louis Boullée, French architect (b. 1728)
- February 7 – Qianlong Emperor of China (b. 1711)
- February 9 – Johann Baptist Babel, Swiss sculptor (b. 1716)
- February 12
  - František Xaver Dušek, Czech composer (b. 1731)
  - Lazzaro Spallanzani, Italian biologist, physiologist (b. 1729)
- February 16 – Charles Theodore, Elector of Bavaria (b. 1724)
- February 19 – Jean-Charles de Borda, French mathematician, physicist, political scientist and sailor (b. 1733)
- February 22 – Heshen, Manchu official under Qianlong (b. 1750)
- February 24 – Georg Christoph Lichtenberg, German scientist, satirist and Anglophile (b. 1742)
- March 13 – Richard Hotham, English property developer and politician (b. 1722)
- March 17 – Sir Charles Thompson, 1st Baronet, British admiral, politician (b. c. 1740)
- March 18
  - Charles Guillaume Le Normant d'Étiolles, French official, husband of Madame de Pompadour (b. 1717)
  - Adam Friedrich Oeser, German etcher (b. 1717)
- March 28 – Etta Palm d'Aelders, Dutch-French feminist (b. 1743)
- March 29 – Helena Dorothea von Schönberg, German industrialist (b. 1729)
- April 3 – Pierre Charles Le Monnier, French astronomer (b. 1715)
- April 6 – Alexander Bezborodko, Grand Chancellor of Russia, architect of Catherine the Great's foreign policy (b. 1747)
- April 28 – Matthew Griswold, 17th Governor of Connecticut (1784–1786) (b. 1714)
- May 2 – Guemes Padilla Horcasitas, Viceroy of New Spain (b. 1740)
- May 4 – Tipu Sultan, Indian warrior and ruler of the Kingdom of Mysore, killed in battle (b. 1750)
- May 18 – Pierre Beaumarchais, French writer (b. 1732)
- May 22 – Toypurina, Medicine woman of the Tongva nation and rebel leader (b. 1750)
- May 26 – James Burnett, Lord Monboddo, Scottish jurist (b. 1714)
- May 30 – Robert McQueen, Lord Braxfield, Scottish advocate and judge (b. 1722)
- June 6 – Patrick Henry, American revolutionary politician, Governor of Virginia (b. 1736)
- June 7 – Victoire of France, French princess (b.1733)
- June 10 – Chevalier de Saint-Georges, Guadeloupe-born French musician (b. 1745)
- June 24 – Dunbar Douglas, 4th Earl of Selkirk, Scottish peer (b. 1722)
- June 30 – Francesco Caracciolo, Neapolitan admiral, revolutionist (b. 1752)

=== July–December ===
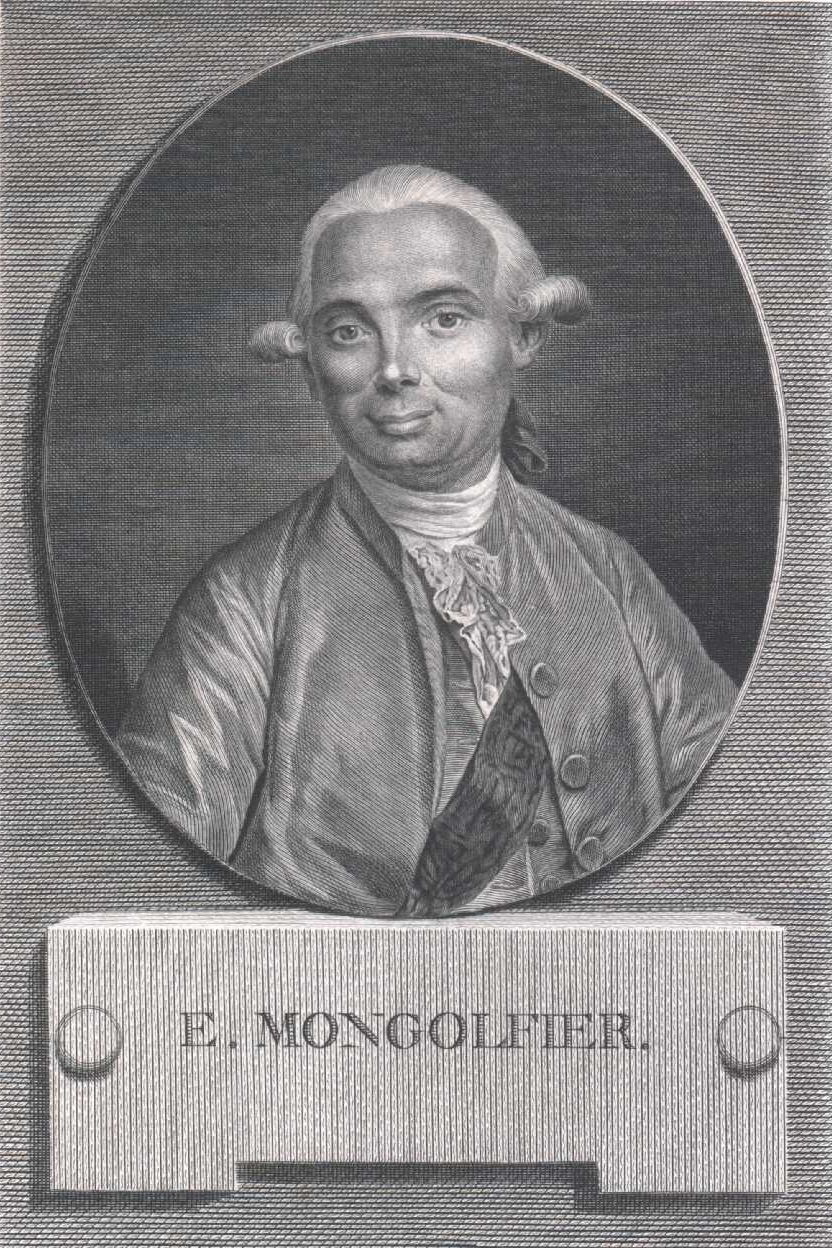
Jacques-Étienne Montgolfier

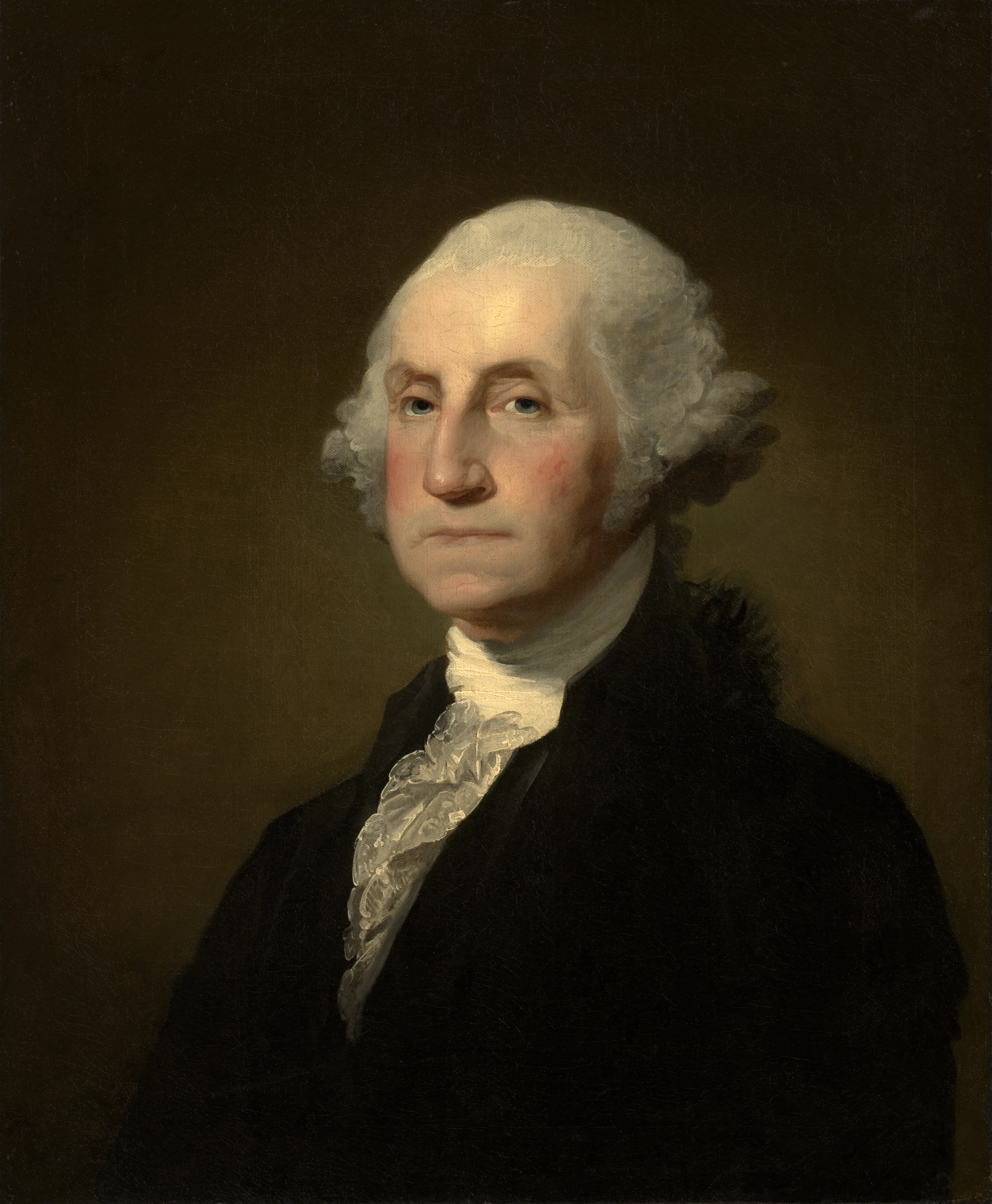
George Washington

- July 7 – William Curtis, English botanist, entomologist (b. 1746)
- August 2 – Jacques Étienne Montgolfier, French inventor of the hot-air balloon, balloonist (b. 1744)
- August 4 – John Bacon, British sculptor (b. 1740)
- August 5 – Richard Howe, British admiral (b. 1726)
- August 15 – Barthélemy Catherine Joubert, French general (b. 1769)
- August 29 – Pope Pius VI (b. 1717)
- August 31 – Nicolas-Henri Jardin, French architect (b. 1720)
- September 7
  - Jan Ingenhousz, Dutch physician, physiologist, biologist and chemist (b. 1730)
  - Louis Guillaume Lemonnier, French botanist (b. 1717)
- October 6 – William Withering, British physician (b. 1741)
- October 9 – Pierre Pigneau de Behaine, French priest who helped to establish the Nguyễn dynasty (b. 1741)
- October 20 – James Iredell, Associate Justice of the Supreme Court of the United States (b. 1751)
- October 24 – Carl Ditters von Dittersdorf, Austrian composer (b. 1739)
- November 22 – Judith van Dorth, Dutch orangist (b. 1747)
- November 23 – Mark Robinson (Royal Navy officer), Royal Navy admiral (b. 1722)
- December 6 – Joseph Black, Scottish physician, physicist and chemist (b. 1728)
- December 14 – George Washington, military leader of the American Revolution, president of the Constitutional Convention (1787) and 1st President of the United States (b. 1732)
- December 18 – Jean-Étienne Montucla, French mathematician (b. 1725)
- December 31 – Jean-François Marmontel, French historian and writer (b. 1723)

== See also ==
- List of state leaders in the 18th century
