= 1797 =

1797 in various calendars
- Gregorian calendar: 1797; MDCCXCVII
- French Republican calendar: 5–6; V–VI
- Ab urbe condita: 2550
- Armenian calendar: 1246; ԹՎ ՌՄԽԶ
- Assyrian calendar: 6547
- Balinese saka calendar: 1718–1719
- Bengali calendar: 1203–1204
- Berber calendar: 2747
- British Regnal year: 37 Geo. 3 – 38 Geo. 3
- Buddhist calendar: 2341
- Burmese calendar: 1159
- Byzantine calendar: 7305–7306
- Chinese calendar: 丙辰年 (Fire Dragon); 4494 or 4287 — to — 丁巳年 (Fire Snake); 4495 or 4288
- Coptic calendar: 1513–1514
- Discordian calendar: 2963
- Ethiopian calendar: 1789–1790
- Hebrew calendar: 5557–5558
- Hindu calendars
- Vikram Samvat: 1853–1854
- Shaka Samvat: 1718–1719
- Kali Yuga: 4897–4898
- Holocene calendar: 11797
- Igbo calendar: 797–798
- Iranian calendar: 1175–1176
- Islamic calendar: 1211–1212
- Japanese calendar: Kansei 9 (寛政９年)
- Javanese calendar: 1723–1724
- Julian calendar: Gregorian minus 11 days
- Korean calendar: 4130
- Minguo calendar: 115 before ROC 民前115年
- Nanakshahi calendar: 329
- Thai solar calendar: 2339–2340
- Tibetan calendar: མེ་ཕོ་འབྲུག་ལོ་ (male Fire-Dragon); 1923 or 1542 or 770 — to — མེ་མོ་སྦྲུལ་ལོ་ (female Fire-Snake); 1924 or 1543 or 771

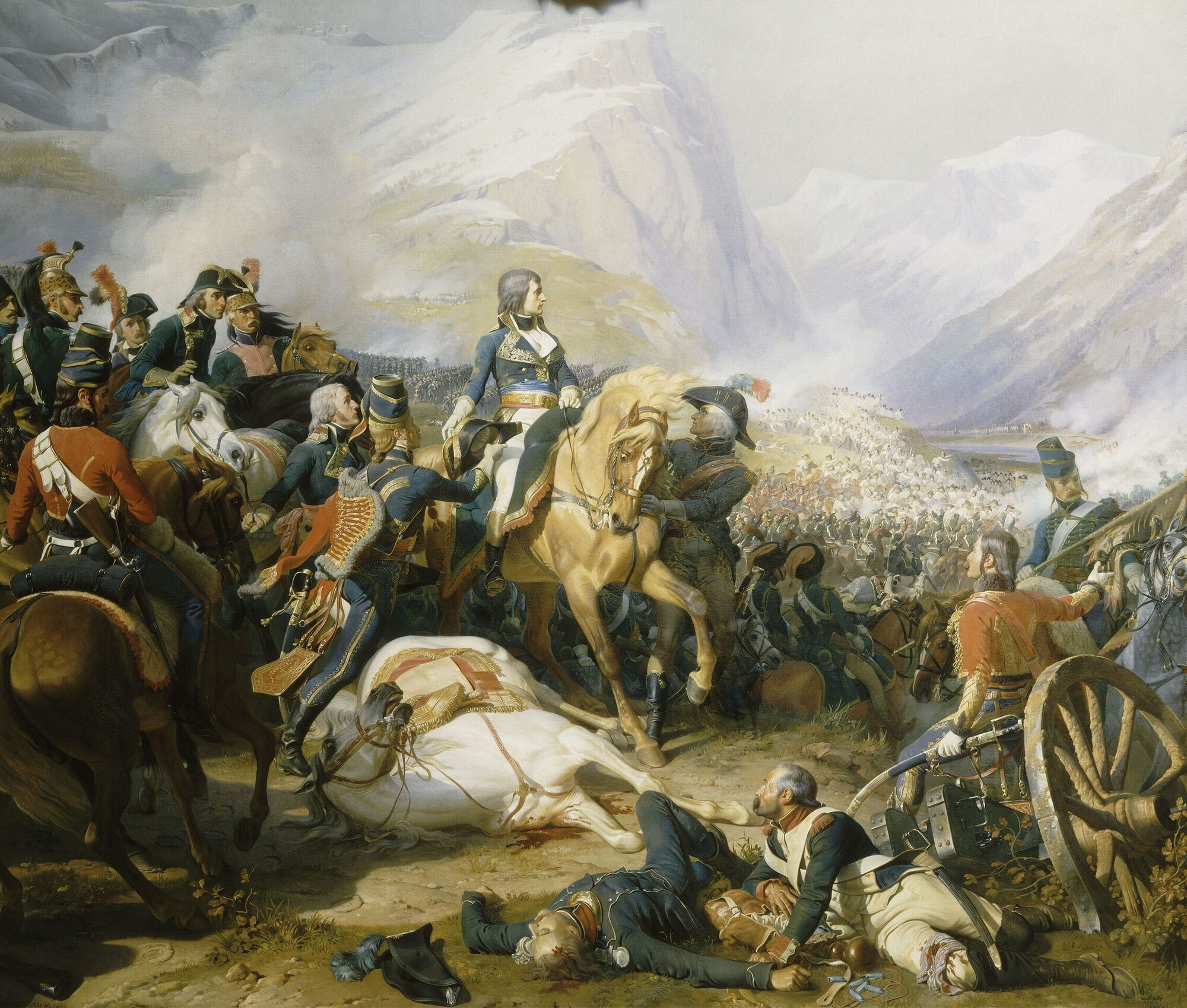
January 14: Napoleon leads troops to victory at Battle of Rivoli.

1797 (MDCCXCVII) was a common year starting on Sunday of the Gregorian calendar and a common year starting on Thursday of the Julian calendar, the 1797th year of the Common Era (CE) and Anno Domini (AD) designations, the 797th year of the 2nd millennium, the 97th year of the 18th century, and the 8th year of the 1790s decade. As of the start of 1797, the Gregorian calendar was 11 days ahead of the Julian calendar, which remained in localized use until 1923.

== Events ==
=== January–March ===
- January 3 – The Treaty of Tripoli, a peace treaty between the United States and Ottoman Tripolitania, is signed at Algiers (see also 1796).
- January 7 – The parliament of the Cisalpine Republic adopts the Italian green-white-red tricolour as their official flag (this is considered the birth of the flag of Italy).
- January 13 – Action of 13 January 1797, part of the War of the First Coalition: Two British Royal Navy frigates, HMS Indefatigable and HMS Amazon, drive the French 74-gun ship of the line Droits de l'Homme aground on the coast of Brittany, resulting in over 900 deaths.
- January 14 – War of the First Coalition – Battle of Rivoli: French forces under General Napoleon Bonaparte defeat an Austrian army of 28,000 men, under Feldzeugmeister József Alvinczi, near Rivoli (modern-day Italy), ending Austria's fourth and final attempt to relieve the fortress city of Mantua.
- January 15–16 – War of the First Coalition – Battle of La Favorita: French forces (28,000 men) under Napoleon Bonaparte stop the Austrian push to relieve Mantua. The garrison under Field Marshal Dagobert von Wurmser is deprived of food and reinforcements. The next day, Napoleon orders the city to be surrounded and sends French troops under General Pierre Augereau to blockade the approaches from Legnago.
- January 26 – The Treaty of the Third Partition of Poland is signed in St. Petersburg by the Russian Empire, Austria and the Kingdom of Prussia.
- February 2 – Siege of Mantua: Field marshal Dagobert von Wurmser surrenders the fortress city to the French; only 16,000 men of the garrison are capable of marching out as prisoners of war.
- February 3 – Battle of Faenza: A French corps (9,000 men) under General Claude-Victor Perrin defeats the forces from the Papal States, at Castel Bolognese near Faenza, Italy.
- February 4 – The Riobamba earthquake in Ecuador, estimated magnitude 8.3, causes up to 40,000 casualties.
- February 12 – "Gott erhalte Franz den Kaiser" is first performed, with the music composed in January by Joseph Haydn, and it also becomes the tune of the Deutschlandlied, the German national anthem (Deutschland, Deutschland über alles, later Einigkeit und Recht und Freiheit).
- February 14 – French Revolutionary Wars – Battle of Cape St. Vincent: The British Royal Navy under Admiral Sir John Jervis defeats a larger Spanish fleet off Cape St. Vincent, Portugal.
- February 18 – Invasion of Trinidad: Spanish Governor José María Chacón peacefully surrenders the colony of Trinidad to a British naval force, commanded by Sir Ralph Abercromby.
- February 19 – Treaty of Tolentino: Pope Pius VI signs a peace treaty with Revolutionary France. He is forced to deliver works of art, treasures, territory, the Comtat Venaissin, and 30 million francs.
- February 22 – The last invasion of Britain begins: French forces, under the command of American Colonel William Tate, land near Fishguard, Wales.
- February 25 – William Tate surrenders to the British at Fishguard.
- February 26 – Bank Restriction Act removes the requirement for the Bank of England (the national bank of Great Britain) to convert banknotes into gold – Restriction period lasts until 1821. The Bank of England issues the first one-pound and two-pound notes (pound notes discontinued March 11, 1988).
- March 5 – Protestant missionaries from the London Missionary Society land in Tahiti, from the Duff (celebrated as Missionary Day in French Polynesia).
- March 13 – Médée, an opera by Luigi Cherubini, is premiered in Paris.
- March 16 – Battle of Valvasone: The Austrian army, led by Archduke Charles, fights a rearguard action at the crossing of the Tagliamento River, but is defeated by Napoleon Bonaparte at Valvasone.
- March 21 – Battle of Parramatta: Resistance leader Pemulwuy leads a group of aboriginal warriors, estimated to be at least 100, in an attack on a government farm at Toongabbie in Sydney, Australia.

=== April–June ===
- April 16 – The Spithead and Nore mutinies break out in the British Royal Navy.
- April 17
  - Battle of San Juan: Sir Ralph Abercromby unsuccessfully invades San Juan, Puerto Rico in what will be one of the largest British attacks on Spanish territories in the western hemisphere, and one of the worst defeats of the British Royal Navy for years to come.
  - Veronese Easter: Citizens of Verona, Italy, began an unsuccessful eight-day rebellion against the French occupying forces.
- April 18 – Armistice of Leoben: On behalf of the French Republic, a delegation under Napoleon Bonaparte signs a peace treaty with the Holy Roman Empire at Leoben.
- May 10 – The first ship of the United States Navy, the frigate USS United States, is commissioned.
- May 12 – War of the First Coalition: Napoleon Bonaparte conquers Venice, ending the city and Republic of Venice's 1,100 years of independence. The last doge of Venice, Ludovico Manin, steps down. The Venetian Ghetto is thrown open.
- May 30 – English abolitionist William Wilberforce marries Barbara Ann Spooner about six weeks after their first meeting.
- June 28 – French troops disembark in Corfu, beginning the First period of French rule in the Ionian Islands.
- June 29 – Napoleon Bonaparte decrees the birth of the Cisalpine Republic; he appoints ministers and establishes the first constitution.

=== July–September ===
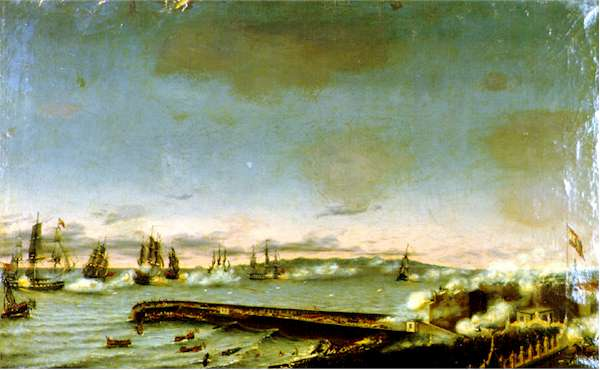
July 24: Battle of Santa Cruz

- July 9 – U.S. Senator William Blount becomes the first federal legislator to be expelled from office, as his fellow Senators vote 25 to 1 to block him from his seat during an investigation against him on charges of criminal conspiracy.
- July 13 – Gual and España conspiracy against Spanish rule in Colonial Venezuela is exposed.
- July 24 – Horatio Nelson is wounded at the Battle of Santa Cruz, losing an arm.
- August 29 – Massacre of Tranent: British troops attack protestors against enforced recruitment into the militia at Tranent, Scotland, killing 11 and injuring 8.
- September 4 – The Coup of 18 Fructidor is carried out in France as three of the five members of The Directory, France's executive council, arrested royalist members of the Council of Five Hundred, the national legislature, and discard the results of the spring elections.
- September 5 – France's new government decrees that citizens who left the country without authorization are subject to the death penalty if they return.
- September 30 – Dominique-Vincent Ramel-Nogaret, French finance minister, repudiates two thirds of France's debt.

=== October–December ===
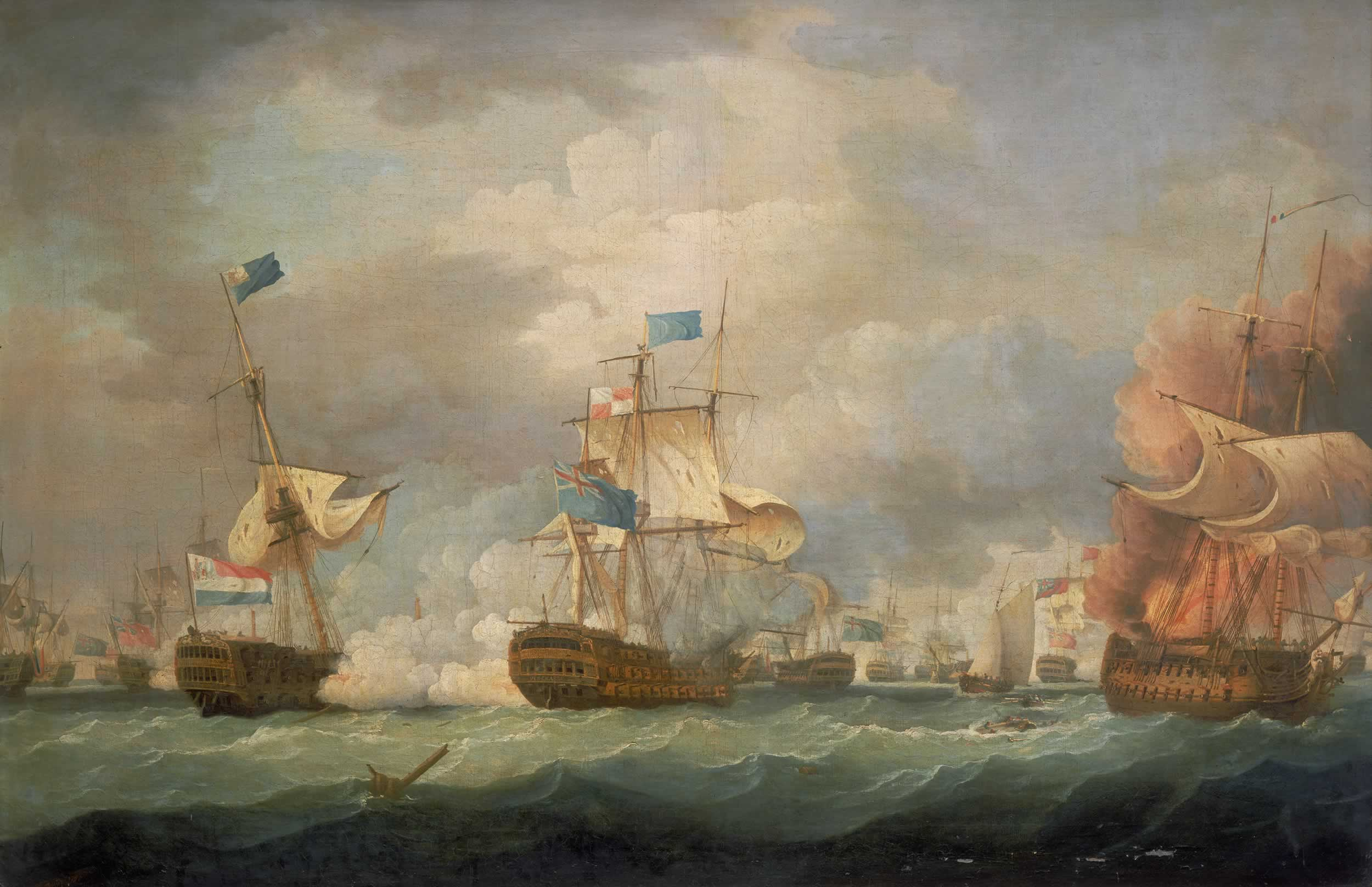
October 11: Battle of Camperdown

- October 11 – Battle of Camperdown: the British Royal Navy defeats the fleet of the Batavian Republic off the coast of Holland.
- October 17 – The Treaty of Campo Formio ends the War of the First Coalition.
- October 18 – The XYZ Affair inflames tensions between France and the United States when American negotiators Charles Cotesworth Pinckney, John Marshall, and Elbridge Gerry meet with French government representatives Jean-Conrad Hottinguer, Pierre Bellamy and Lucien Hauteval and are told that a treaty between France and the U.S. will require payment of a bribe to France's Foreign Minister Charles Talleyrand and a large loan of American cash to France. Pinckney tells people later that his response was "No, no, not a sixpence!"; Hottinguer, Bellamy and Hauteval are referred to, respectively, as "X", "Y" and "Z" in U.S. government reports on the failed negotiations.
- October 21 – In Boston Harbor, the 44-gun United States Navy frigate USS Constitution is launched to fight Barbary pirates off the coast of Tripoli; the ship will remain in commission in the 21st century.
- October 22 – André-Jacques Garnerin makes the first parachute descent, at Parc Monceau, Paris; he uses a silk parachute to descend approximately 3,000 feet (910 m) from a hot air balloon.
- November – 1797 Rugby School rebellion: The students at Rugby School in England rebel against the headmaster, Henry Ingles, after he decrees that the damage to a tradesman's windows should be paid for by the students.
- November 16
  - The Prussian heir apparent, Frederick William, becomes King of Prussia as Fredrick William III.
  - (or November 23?) – British Royal Navy frigate HMS Tribune (1796) is wrecked on the approaches to Halifax, Nova Scotia; of the 240 on board, all but 12 are lost.

=== Undated ===
- The secret Lautaro Lodge as the Logia de los Caballeros Racionales ("Lodge of Rational Knights") is founded, perhaps in Cádiz; membership will include many leaders of the Spanish American wars of independence such as Francisco de Miranda, Bernardo O'Higgins and José de San Martín.
- Shinyukan Cram School (進修館) founded by Masataka Okudaira (奥平昌孝) in Nakatsu, Buzen Province (now Oita Prefecture), Kyushu Island, as predecessor of Keio-Gijyuku University in Japan.
- Joseph-Louis Lagrange publishes his treatise on differential calculus, entitled Théorie des fonctions analytiques.

== Births ==
=== January–March ===
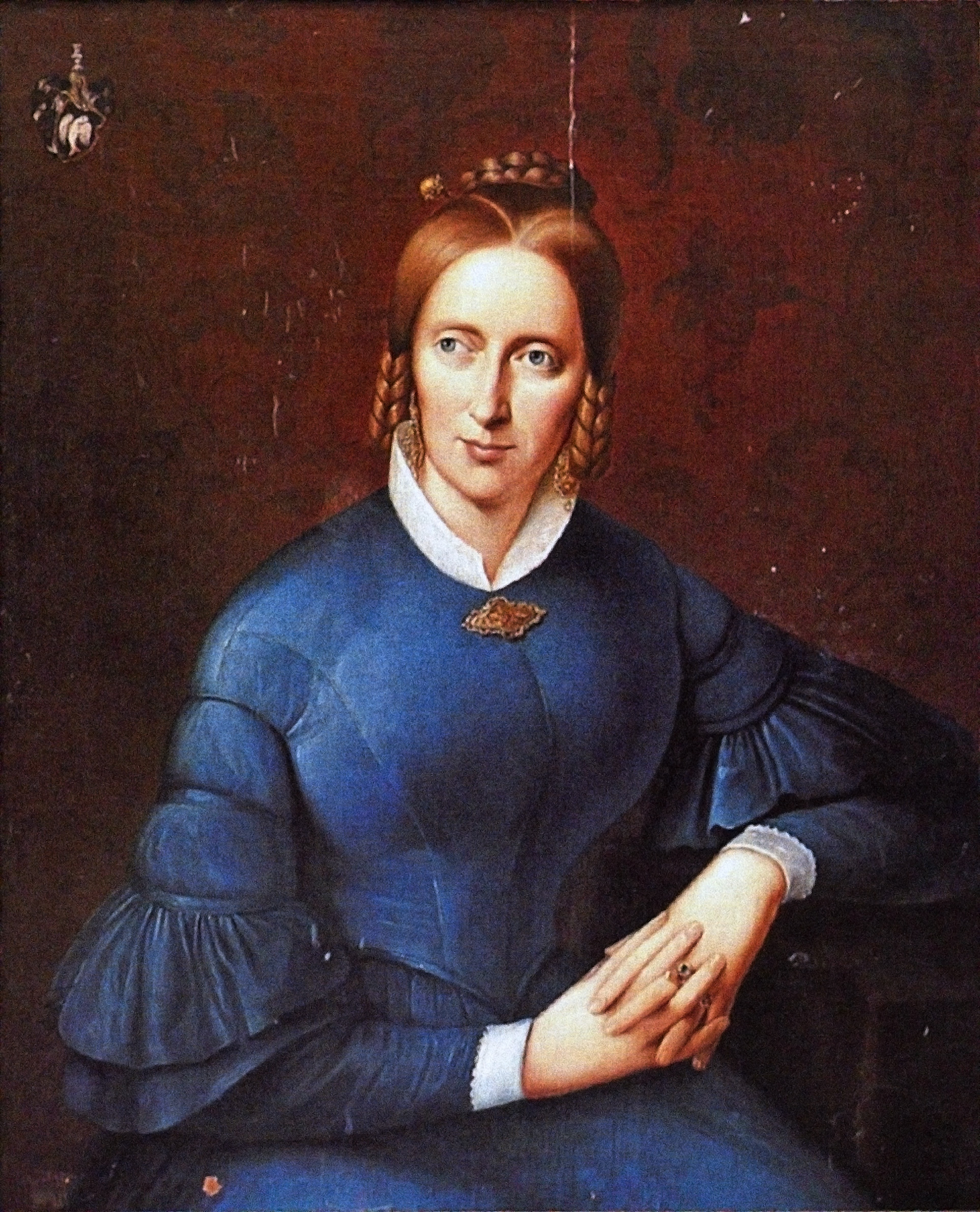
Annette von Droste-Hülshoff

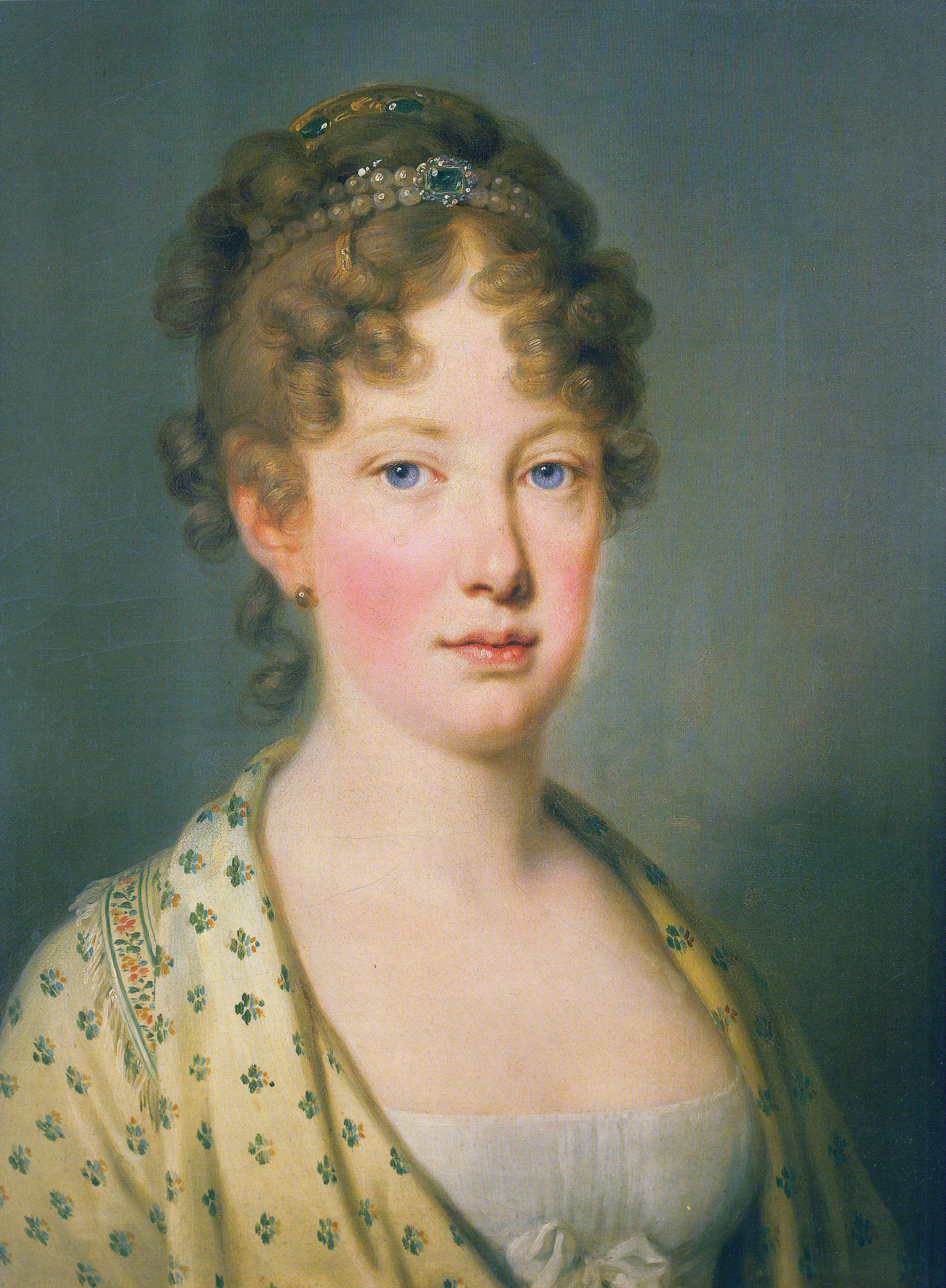
Maria Leopoldina of Austria

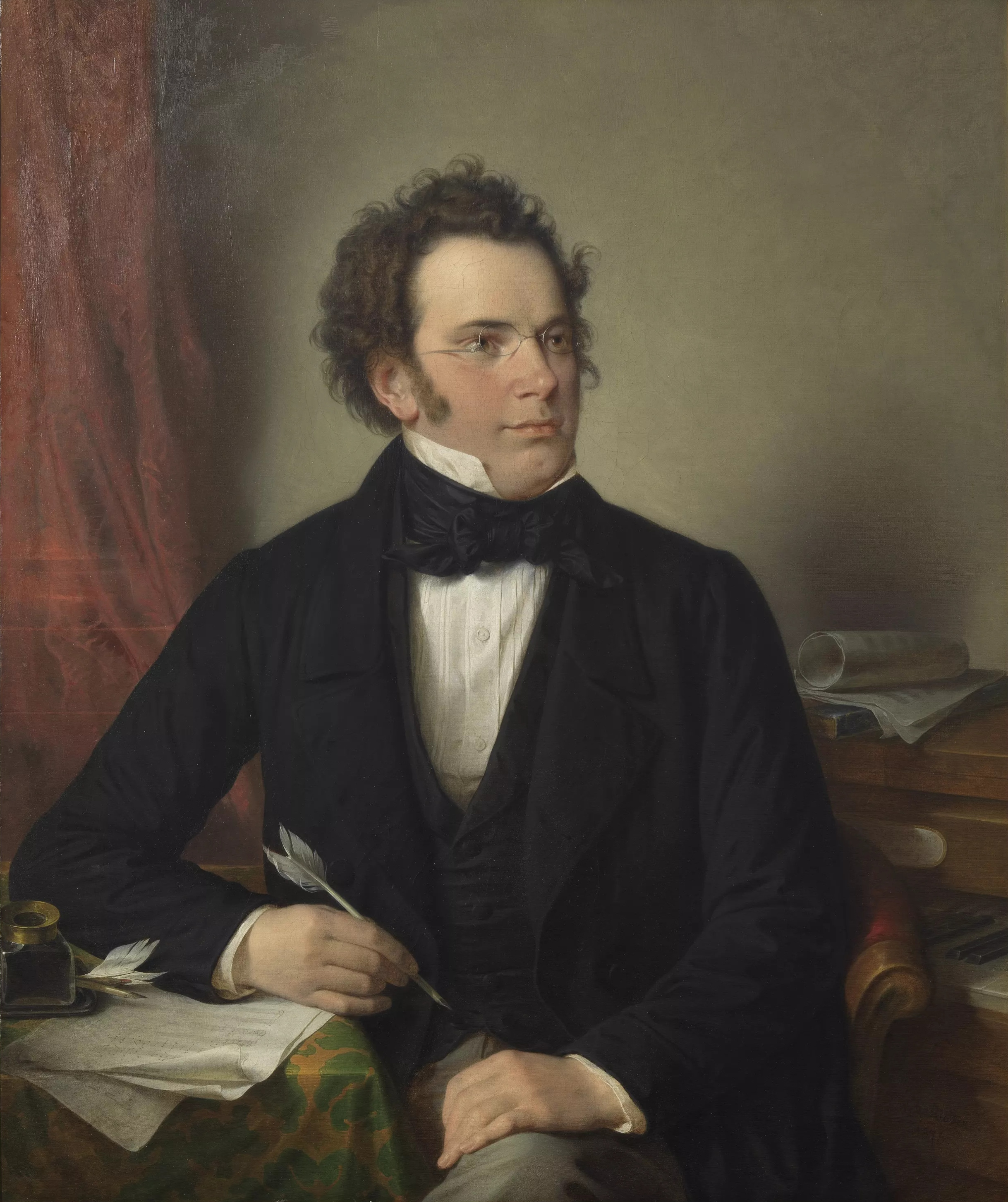
Franz Schubert

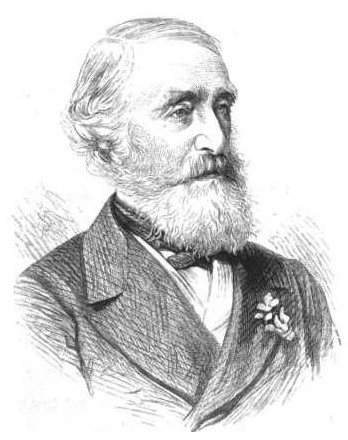
George Julius Poulett Scrope

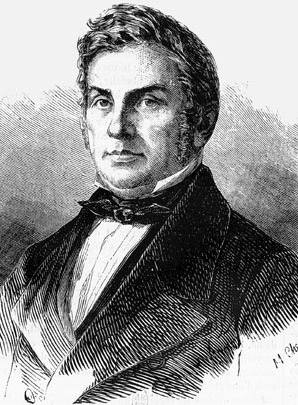
Michel Goudchaux

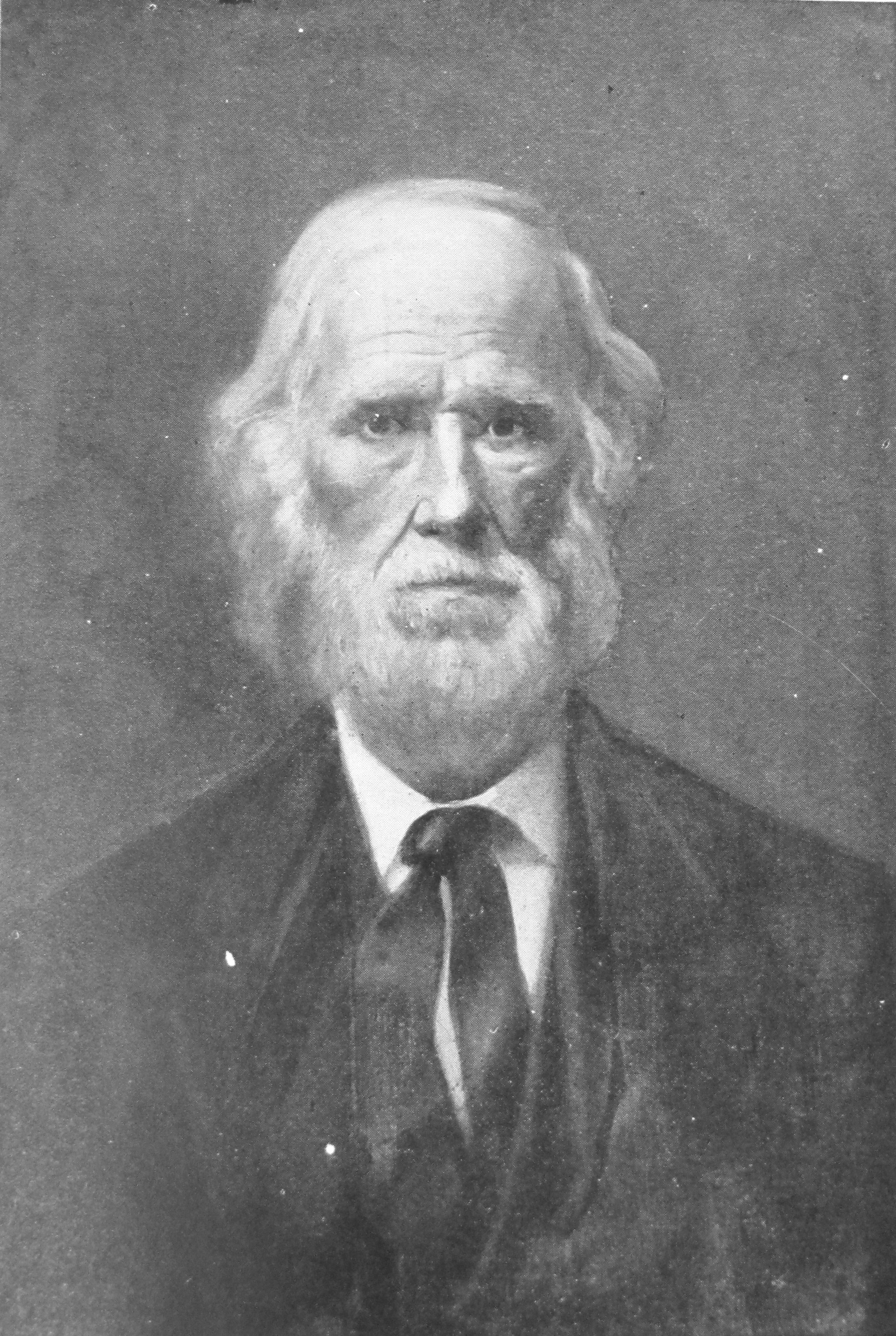
J. G. M. Ramsey

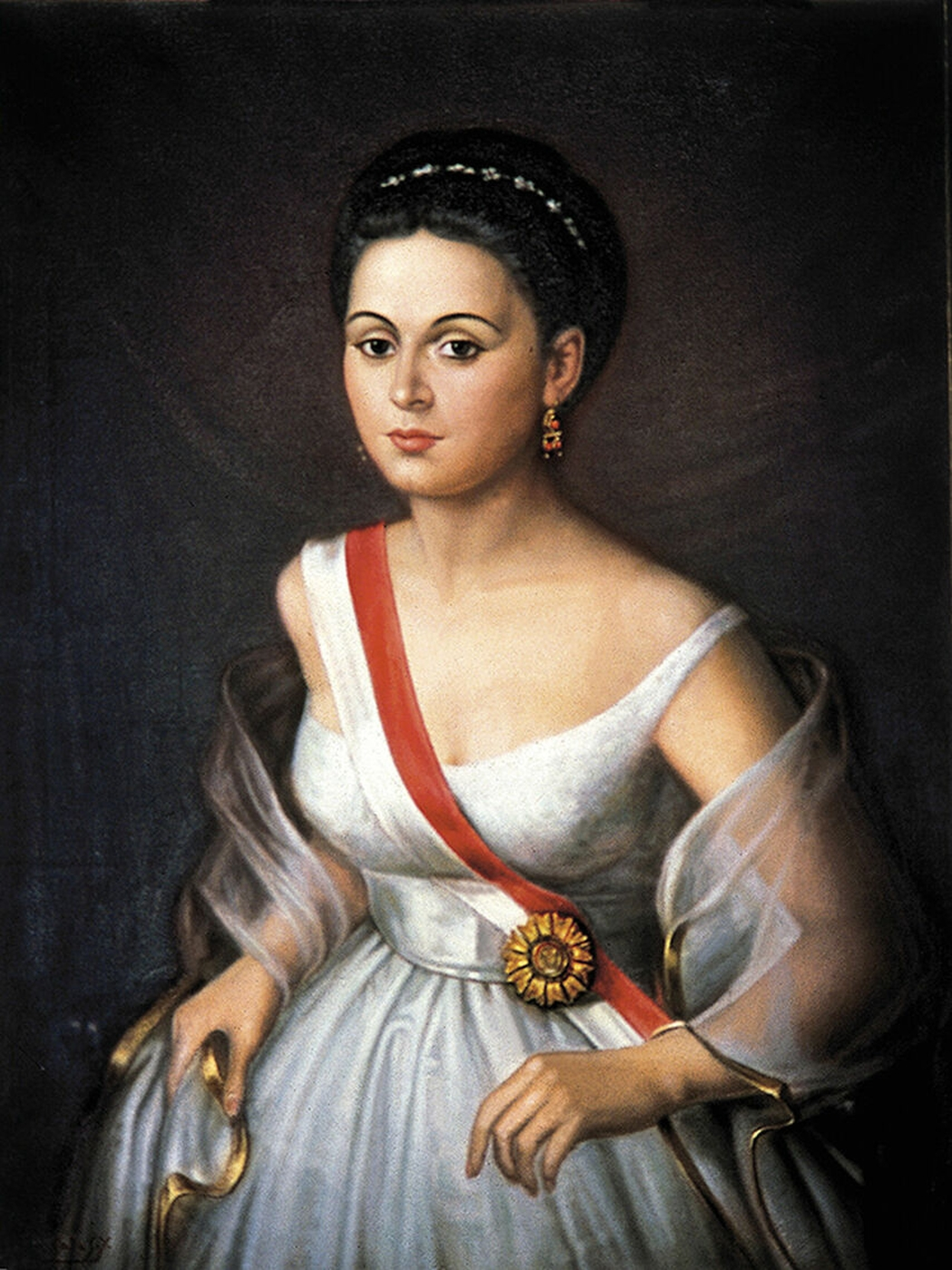
Manuela Sáenz

- January 1
  - Christopher Jacob Boström, Swedish philosopher (d. 1866)
  - Utagawa Kuniyoshi, Japanese woodblock printer (ukiyo-e) (d. 1861)
- January 3 – Frederick William Hope, English entomologist at the University of Oxford (d. 1862)
- January 4 – Wilhelm Beer, German banker, astronomer (d. 1850)
- January 5 – Eduard Vogel von Falckenstein, Prussian general (d. 1885)
- January 6 – Edward Turner Bennett, English zoologist and writer (d. 1836)
- January 9 – Edmund Murray Dodd, Canadian lawyer (d. 1876)
- January 10 – Annette von Droste-Hülshoff, German writer (d. 1848)
- January 11
  - Carl Rottmann, German landscape painter, the most famous member of the Rottmann family of painters (d. 1850)
  - Connop Thirlwall, English bishop (in Wales), historian (d. 1875)
- January 12
  - Gideon Brecher, Austrian physician, writer (d. 1873)
- January 14 – George Agar-Ellis, 1st Baron Dover, British peer and man of letters (d. 1833)
- January 15 – Vincenz Kollar, Austrian entomologist specializing in Diptera (d. 1860)
- January 17 – Joseph Barclay Pentland, Irish geographer (d. 1873)
- January 19
  - Henri-Bernard Dabadie, French baritone (d. 1853)
  - Cornelia Aletta van Hulst, Dutch painter (d. 1870)
- January 20 – Jonathan Leavitt, American bookbinder, co-founder of the New York City publishing firm of Leavitt & Trow (d. 1852)
- January 21 – Joseph Méry, French writer (d. 1866)
- January 22
  - Archduchess Maria Leopoldina of Austria, Empress consort of Brazil (d. 1826)
  - Thomas Moore-Lane, Irish oculist, surgeon, physician to the Nawab (d. 1844)
- January 24 – Leo Dupont, Martinique-born Venerated French Catholic, who helped spread various Catholic devotions (d. 1876)
- January 25
  - Achille Rémy Percheron, French entomologist (d. 1869)
  - John Stuart, 12th Earl of Moray (d. 1867)
- January 26 – Therese Albertine Luise Robinson, German-American author (d. 1870)
- January 28 – Narcisse Girard, French violinist (d. 1860)
- January 29
  - Marguerite Beaubien, Canadian nun, mother superior with the Sisters of Charity (d. 1848)
  - Prince Adolf zu Hohenlohe-Ingelfingen, Prussian nobleman (d. 1873)
- January 30 – Edwin Vose Sumner, career United States Army officer who became a Union Army general during the American Civil War (d. 1863)
- January 31 – Franz Schubert, Austrian pianist, composer (d. 1828)
- February 1 – Frederick Sullivan, English first-class cricketer associated with Marylebone Cricket Club (MCC) (d. 1873)
- February 2
  - Joseph Louis Corbin, French general who took command of the successful attack that lifted the Siege of Constantine in 1837 (d. 1859)
  - Bertha Zück, German-born treasurer of Queen Josephine of Sweden (d. 1868)
- February 5 – György Andrássy, Hungarian nobleman (d. 1872)
- February 6
  - Richard Hawes, United States Representative from Kentucky and the second Confederate Governor of Kentucky (d. 1877)
  - Vaast Barthélemy Henry, French Catholic priest (d. 1884)
  - Joseph von Radowitz, conservative Prussian statesman, general (d. 1853)
- February 10 – George Chichester, 3rd Marquess of Donegall, British landowner, courtier and politician (d. 1883)
- February 11 – Richard Temple-Nugent-Brydges-Chandos-Grenville, 2nd Duke of Buckingham and Chandos, English Conservative politician (d. 1861)
- February 12 – John Timon, first Roman Catholic Bishop of Buffalo (d. 1867)
- February 14 – Pierre Sylvain Dumon, French politician, deputy (1831-1848) (d. 1870)
- February 15 – Henry Engelhard Steinway, German-American piano manufacturer (d. 1871)
- February 17 – Charles Alexandre, French Hellenist (d. 1870)
- February 18
  - Jean-Baptiste Boucho, French-born Vicar Apostolic of Malacca-Singapore (d. 1871)
  - John Day, Liberian politician and jurist, 2nd Chief Justice of Liberia (1854 until his death) (d. 1859)
- February 19
  - Giuseppe Avezzana, Italian soldier fighting in Europe and America (d. 1879)
  - Wincenty Smokowski, Polish-Lithuanian painter, illustrator (Academic and Classical styles) (d. 1876)
- February 21 – João Mouzinho de Albuquerque, Portuguese writer, administrator (d. 1881)
- February 22
  - Jean Baptiste Hippolyte Dance, French pathologist remembered for Dance's sign (d. 1832)
  - Yelizaveta Golitsyna, Russian noble, Catholic nun (d. 1844)
- February 23 – Heinrich Halfeld, German engineer (d. 1873)
- February 24 – Samuel Lover, Irish songwriter (d. 1868)
- February 25 – Maria Abdy, English poet (d. 1867)
- February 27
  - Wilhelm Meinhold, Pomeranian priest, author (d. 1851)
  - Henry George Ward, English diplomat, politician, and colonial administrator (d. 1860)
- February 28 – John Henderson, Mississippi lawyer, United States Senator (d. 1857)
- March 2 – Étienne Mulsant, French entomologist, ornithologist (d. 1880)
- March 3 – Gotthilf Hagen, German civil engineer who made important contributions to fluid dynamics (d. 1884)
- March 5
  - Friedrich von Gerolt, Prussian Privy Councillor, Envoy Extraordinary and Minister Plenipotentiary in the United States (d. 1879)
  - James Rider, American politician from New York (d. 1876)
- March 6 – Gerrit Smith, American social reformer (d. 1874)
- March 7 – Édouard Thibaudeau, Lower Canadian lawyer, political figure (d. 1836)
- March 10
  - Henry Acton, English Unitarian minister (d. 1843)
  - Selah R. Hobbie, United States Representative from New York (d. 1854)
  - Henry Liddell, 1st Earl of Ravensworth, British peer, Member of Parliament for several constituencies (d. 1878)
  - George Julius Poulett Scrope, English geologist, political economist and magistrate (d. 1876)
- March 12 – Benjamin Caesar, English professional cricketer who played first-class cricket (1824-1830) (d. 1867)
- March 13
  - Eleazer Parmly, American dentist in New York City (d. 1874)
  - Charles de Rémusat, French politician and writer (d. 1875)
  - George Bacon Wood, American physician (d. 1879)
- March 15 – Benjamin Guérard, French librarian, historian (d. 1854)
- March 16
  - Lavinia Ryves, British woman claiming to be a member of the British royal family (d. 1871)
  - Alaric Alexander Watts, British poet, journalist (d. 1864)
- March 17
  - Andrew Fernando Holmes, Canadian physician (d. 1860)
  - Johann Adam Pupikofer, Swiss historian, curator of the Thurgau cantonal archive in Frauenfeld (d. 1882)
- March 18 – Michel Goudchaux, French banker, politician who was twice Minister of Finance during the French Second Republic (d. 1862)
- March 19
  - John Braithwaite, English engineer, inventor of the first steam fire engine (d. 1870)
  - Addison Gardiner, American lawyer and politician, Chief Judge of the New York Court of Appeals (1854-1855) (d. 1883)
- March 20 – John Roberton, Scottish physician, social reformer (d. 1876)
- March 21 – Johann Andreas Wagner, German palaeontologist (d. 1861)
- March 22
  - Eduard Gans, German jurist (d. 1839)
  - Emperor Wilhelm I of Germany (d. 1888)
  - Jean-Bernard Rousseau, French Roman Catholic professed religious of the Institute of the Brothers of the Christian Schools (d. 1867)
  - Józef Zaliwski, Polish independence activist (d. 1855)
- March 23 – Ernest Edgcumbe, 3rd Earl of Mount Edgcumbe, English politician (d. 1861)
- March 24
  - Abraham Hoagland, early American Mormon leader (d. 1872)
  - Thomas B. Jackson, United States Representative from New York (d. 1881)
  - Sackville Lane-Fox, British Conservative Party politician (d. 1874)
  - Antonio Rosmini-Serbati, Italian Catholic priest, philosopher (d. 1855)
- March 25
  - Auguste-Arthur, Comte de Beugnot, French historian, statesman (d. 1865)
  - J. G. M. Ramsey, American historian (d. 1884)
  - John Winebrenner, American founder of the Churches of God General Conference (d. 1860)
- March 26
  - Fortunato José Barreiros, Portuguese colonial administrator, military architect (d. 1885)
  - Joseph Fielding, early American leader of the Latter Day Saint movement (d. 1863)
  - Hedworth Lambton, Liberal Party politician in the United Kingdom (d. 1876)
- March 27
  - John Dix Fisher, physician and founder of Perkins Institution for the Blind in Boston (d. 1850)
  - George Glyn, 1st Baron Wolverton, English banker with interests in the railways (d. 1873)
  - Heinrich LXXII, Prince Reuss of Lobenstein and Ebersdorf (d. 1853)
  - Alfred de Vigny, French poet, early leader of French Romanticism (d. 1863)
- March 28 – George O. Belden, American politician, Representative from New York (d. 1833)
- March 29 – Charles I. du Pont, American manufacturer, politician (d. 1869)
- March 31
  - William Ryerson, Methodist minister, political figure in western Canada (d. 1872)
  - Walter Calverley Trevelyan, English naturalist, geologist (d. 1879)

=== April–June ===
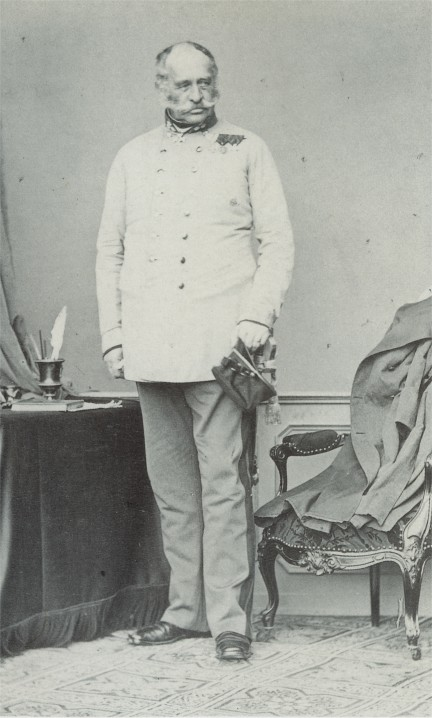
Franz Graf von Wimpffen

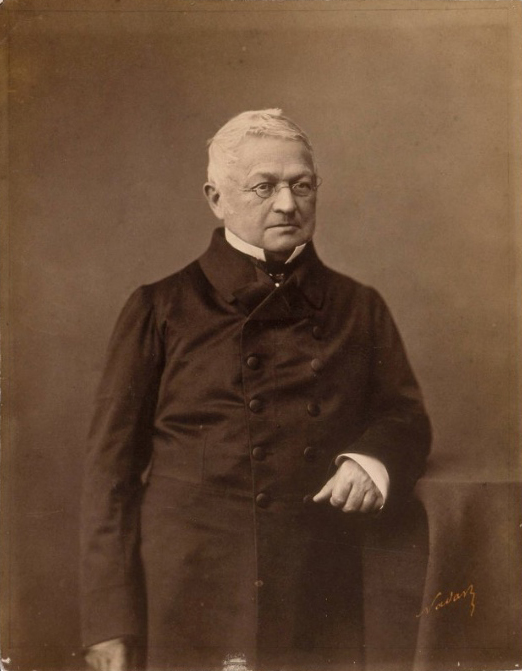
Adolphe Thiers

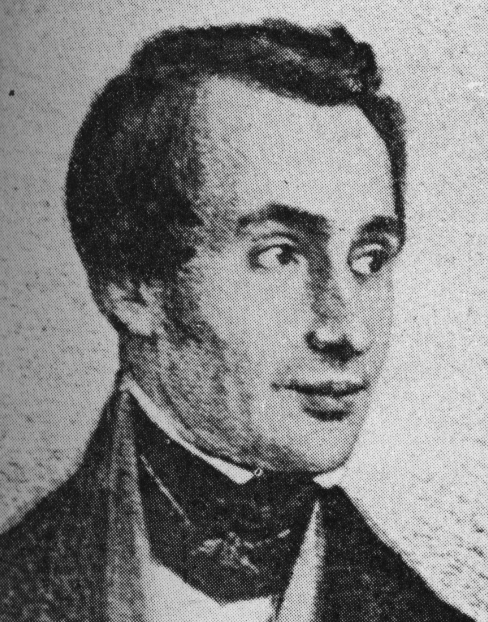
Jean Victoire Audouin

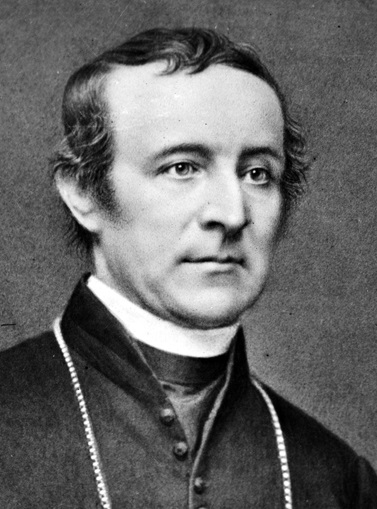
John Hughes

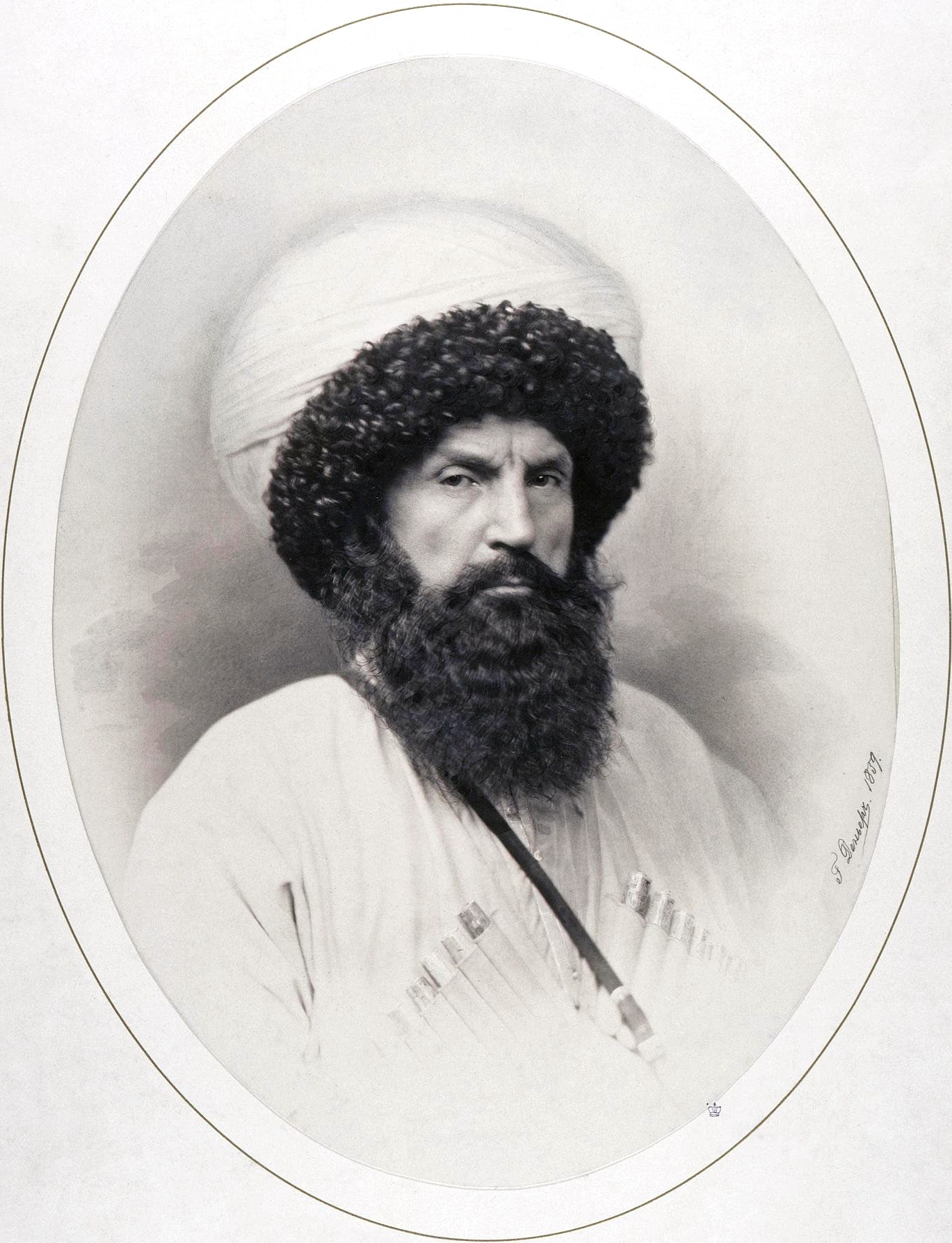
Imam Shamil

- April 1
  - Sir William Alexander, 3rd Baronet of England (d. 1873)
  - Ludwig Titze, Austrian singer associated with Franz Schubert's songs (d. 1850)
- April 2
  - Samuel Bogart, itinerant Methodist minister, militia captain from Ray County, Missouri (d. 1861)
  - Joseph-François Deblois, Lower Canadian lawyer (d. 1860)
  - John Peter Gassiot, English businessman, amateur scientist (d. 1877)
  - Dunning R. McNair, Sergeant at Arms of the United States Senate (1853-1861) (d. 1875)
  - David Robertson, 1st Baron Marjoribanks, Scottish stockbroker, politician (d. 1873)
  - Franz Graf von Wimpffen, Austrian general, admiral (d. 1870)
- April 3
  - Judson Allen, American businessman, politician (d. 1880)
  - Ebenezer Childs, American pioneer (d. 1864)
  - Barthélemy Charles Joseph Dumortier, Belgian botanist, Member of Parliament (d. 1878)
- April 4
  - Asa Wentworth Jr., Vermont businessman and politician, President of the Vermont State Senate (d. 1882)
  - Joseph Dresser Wickham, American minister (d. 1891)
- April 5
  - Karl August Devrient, German stage actor best known for performances of Schiller and Shakespeare (d. 1872)
  - Johann Fischbach, Austrian painter (d. 1871)
  - Henry Perrine, physician, horticulturist, United States Consul in Campeche, Mexico (d. 1840)
- April 6
  - Meta Heusser-Schweizer, Swiss poet (d. 1876)
- April 7
  - Théodore Anne, French playwright (d. 1869)
  - Louis Thomas Jérôme Auzoux, French anatomist, naturalist (d. 1880)
  - Pierre Leroux, French philosopher, political economist (d. 1871)
  - Joseph Young, early American convert to the Latter Day Saint movement, missionary, longtime general authority of the LDS Church (d. 1881)
- April 8 – Jehiel Brooks, American soldier, territorial governor, and plantation owner (d. 1886)
- April 9
  - Pierre Carmouche, French playwright, chansonnier (d. 1868)
  - John Hill, United States Representative from North Carolina (d. 1861)
- April 12 – Zina Pitcher, American physician (d. 1872)
- April 13 – Stanislas Julien, French sinologist, Chair of Chinese at the Collège de France for over 40 years (d. 1873)
- April 15
  - Philip Dorsheimer, politician, New York State Treasurer (d. 1868)
  - Michel Garicoïts, French Basque Roman Catholic priest, founder of the Congregation of the Sacred Heart of Jesus of Bétharram (d. 1863)
  - Adolphe Thiers, President of France and Prime Minister of France (d. 1877)
- April 17
  - William Beresford, British Conservative politician (d. 1883)
  - John Ogilvie, Scottish lexicographer, editor of the Imperial Dictionary of the English Language (d. 1867)
- April 18
  - Thomas J. Drake, American lawyer, Lieutenant Governor of Michigan (d. 1875)
  - Richard Ryan, British biographer of Irish descent (d. 1849)
- April 19
  - Carlo Emanuele Muzzarelli, Italian clergyman (d. 1856)
  - Jeronis de Soysa, pioneering Ceylonese entrepreneur, philanthropist (d. 1860)
- April 21 – George Stephen Benjamin Jarvis, Upper Canadian judge, political figure (d. 1878)
- April 23
  - Ranulph Dacre, New Zealand naval seaman (d. 1884)
  - Giuseppe Ferlini, Italian combat medic turned explorer and treasure hunter (d. 1870)
  - Penina Moise, United States poet (d. 1880)
  - Ernst Ferdinand Oehme, German Romantic painter, illustrator (d. 1855)
- April 24
  - Henry Bliss, author, lawyer and provincial agent for New Brunswick and Nova Scotia (d. 1873)
  - Peter I. Borst, American politician, United States Representative from New York (d. 1848)
- April 26 – Albert Seerig, German surgeon, anatomist (d. 1862)
- April 27
  - Jean Victoire Audouin, French naturalist, entomologist, herpetologist, ornithologist, and malacologist (d. 1841)
  - Eliphaz Fay, fourth president of Colby College (then called the Waterville College) in Maine (d. 1854)
  - William B. Slaughter, United States politician (d. 1879)
  - Linus Yale Sr., American inventor, manufacturer of locks (d. 1858)
- April 28 – John Richardson, Australian convict, accompanies several exploring expeditions as botanical collector (d. 1882)
- April 29 – Gideon Hard, American lawyer, politician (d. 1885)
- May 1
  - Pierre Nicolas Gerdy, French physician, native of Loches-sur-Ource (d. 1856)
  - Johann Jakob Stähelin, Swiss theologian (d. 1875)
- May 2
  - Abraham Pineo Gesner, Canadian geologist and inventor (d. 1864)
- May 3
  - Heinrich Berghaus, German geographer (d. 1884)
  - George Webster, English architect practising in Kendal (d. 1864)
- May 6 – Joseph Brackett, American religious leader, composer (d. 1882)
- May 7
  - Walter Colton, Chaplain for the United States Navy (d. 1851)
  - Charles Frederick, Royal Navy officer, Third Naval Lord (d. 1875)
  - Elizabeth Grant, British diarist (d. 1885)
  - José Antonio Saco, Cuban statesman, deputy to the Spanish Cortes, writer, social critic, publicist, essayist, anthropologist, historian (d. 1879)
- May 8
  - Giacomo Luigi Brignole, Italian Catholic Cardinal, Camerlengo of the Sacred College of Cardinals (d. 1853)
  - John Septimus Roe, first Surveyor-General of Western Australia (d. 1878)
- May 9 – Lansdown Guilding, St. Vincent-born English theologian, early naturalist (d. 1831)
- May 10 – Daniel Lynn Carroll, sixth President of Hampden–Sydney College (1835-1838) (d. 1851)
- May 11
  - Clement Finley, 10th Surgeon General of the United States Army (d. 1879)
  - Ernst Meyer, German-born Danish genre painter of Jewish ancestry (d. 1861)
  - José Mariano Salas, Mexican general and politician, twice interim president of Mexico (1846 and 1859) (d. 1867)
- May 12 – Johann Hermann Kufferath, German composer (d. 1864)
- May 13 – Ulrik Frederik Cappelen, Norwegian jurist and politician (d. 1864)
- May 14 – Carl Georg Christian Schumacher, German painter (d. 1869)
- May 15
  - George Dromgoole, Virginia politician, lawyer (d. 1847)
  - Lydia Irving, British philanthropist, prison visitor (d. 1893)
  - Auguste Bottée de Toulmon, 19th-century French composer, musicologist (d. 1850)
- May 16
  - Pascual Echagüe, Argentine soldier, politician (d. 1867)
  - Pierre-Chéri Lafont, French actor (d. 1873)
- May 18
  - Stoddard Judd, American physician, politician (d. 1873)
  - Frederick Augustus II of Saxony (d. 1854)
- May 19
  - Jean-Baptiste Marc Bourgery, French physician and anatomist, native of Orléans (d. 1849)
  - Richard Pakenham, British diplomat, Ambassador to the United States (d. 1868)
  - Maria Isabel of Portugal, Queen of Spain (d. 1818)
- May 20 – Alexis-François Rio, French writer on art (d. 1874)
- May 21
  - Claus Winter Hjelm, Norwegian legal scholar, judge (d. 1871)
  - Nathan Ryno Smith, American surgeon, medical school professor (d. 1877)
- May 24
  - James Turner Morehead, United States Senator and the 12th Governor of Kentucky (d. 1854)
  - Archibald Randall, United States federal judge (d. 1846)
  - Lars Rasch, Norwegian jurist, politician (d. 1864)
  - Henry Thynne, 3rd Marquess of Bath, England (d. 1837)
- May 26 – Ralph Randolph Gurley, American clergyman (d. 1872)
- May 27 – Sir Thomas Bazley, 1st Baronet of England (d. 1883)
- May 29
  - Edwin Croswell, American journalist, politician (d. 1871)
  - Nicolas Roret, French editor, publisher known for an important series of manuals (Manuels) and encyclopedias (d. 1860)
- May 30 – Georg Amadeus Carl Friedrich Naumann, German mineralogist (d. 1873)
- June 1 – Abby Hadassah Smith, early American suffragist, campaigner for property and voting rights from Glastonbury (d. 1879)
- June 2 – Joseph Blake, 3rd Baron Wallscourt, Irish nobleman and pioneering socialist (d. 1849)
- June 6 – Rehuel Lobatto, Dutch mathematician (d. 1866)
- June 7
  - Manuel Alves Branco, 2nd Viscount of Caravelas, Brazilian politician (d. 1855)
  - Richard Samuel Guinness, Irish lawyer and a Member of Parliament (d. 1857)
- June 8 – Henry William-Powlett, 3rd Baron Bayning, English peer and clergyman (d. 1866)
- June 11
  - Francis Conyngham, 2nd Marquess Conyngham, English soldier, courtier and politician (d. 1876)
  - Henry Lascelles, 3rd Earl of Harewood, English peer and Member of Parliament (d. 1857)
  - José Trinidad Reyes, Honduran Father, national hero, and founder of Autonomous National University of Honduras (d. 1855)
- June 12 – Thomas Ainslie Young, official and political figure in Lower Canada (d. 1860)
- June 15
  - Honoratus Bonnevie, Norwegian politician (d. 1848)
  - Sámuel Brassai, centenarian, linguist, teacher, "The Last Transylvanian Polymath" (d. 1897)
- June 16
  - Sophie Frémiet, French painter (d. 1867)
  - Alexander Kazarsky, Russian Navy officer, hero of the Russo-Turkish War (d. 1833)
- June 17 – Alexandre Vinet, Swiss critic and theologian (d. 1847)
- June 19 – Hamilton Hume, early explorer of the present-day Australian states of New South Wales and Victoria (d. 1873)
- June 20 – Karolina Gerhardinger, German Roman Catholic professed religious, established the School Sisters of Notre Dame (d. 1879)
- June 21 – Christoffel Brand, South African jurist (d. 1875)
- June 23 – Théophile Bra, French Romantic sculptor and exact contemporary of Eugène Delacroix (d. 1863)
- June 24
  - Francisco Freire Allemão e Cysneiro, Brazilian botanist who collected in northeast Brazil and along the Rio de Janeiro (d. 1874)
  - Johan Coenraad van Hasselt, Dutch physician, zoologist (d. 1823)
  - John Hughes, Irish-born prelate of the Roman Catholic Church in the United States (d. 1864)
- June 26 – Imam Shamil, Avar political and religious leader of the Muslim tribes of the Northern Caucasus (d. 1871)
- June 29 – Frederic Baraga, Slovenian Catholic missionary to the United States, grammarian of Native American languages (d. 1868)

=== July–September ===
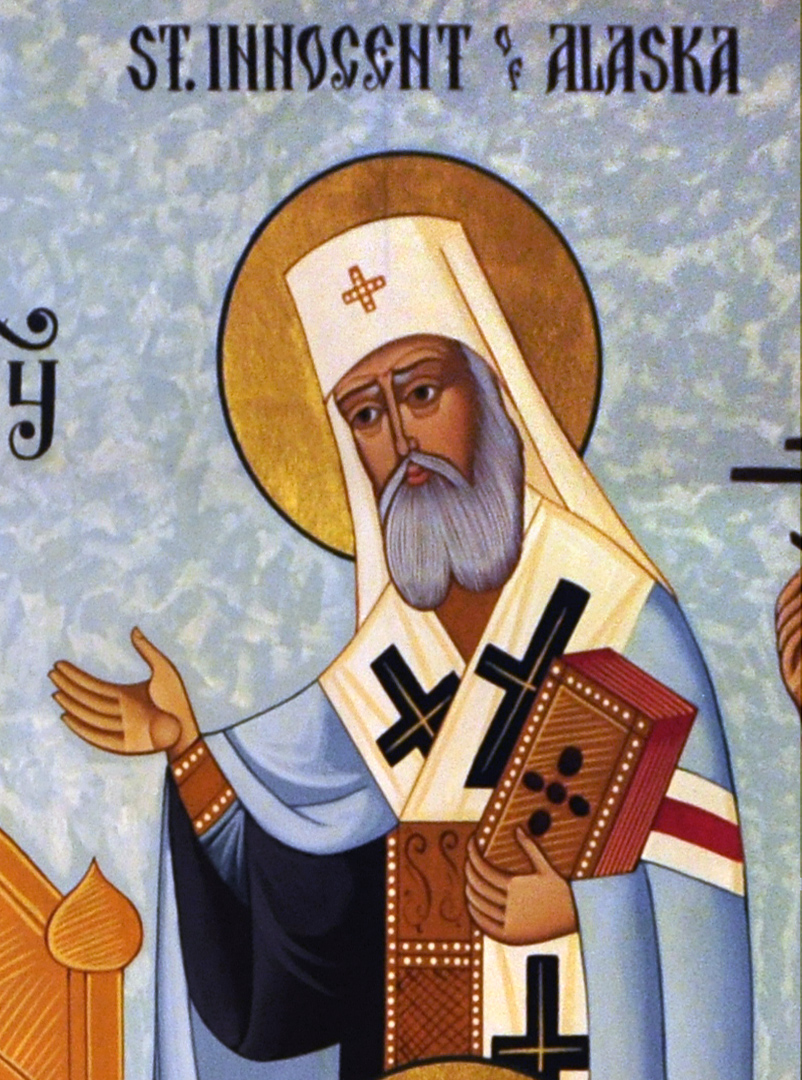
Innocent of Alaska

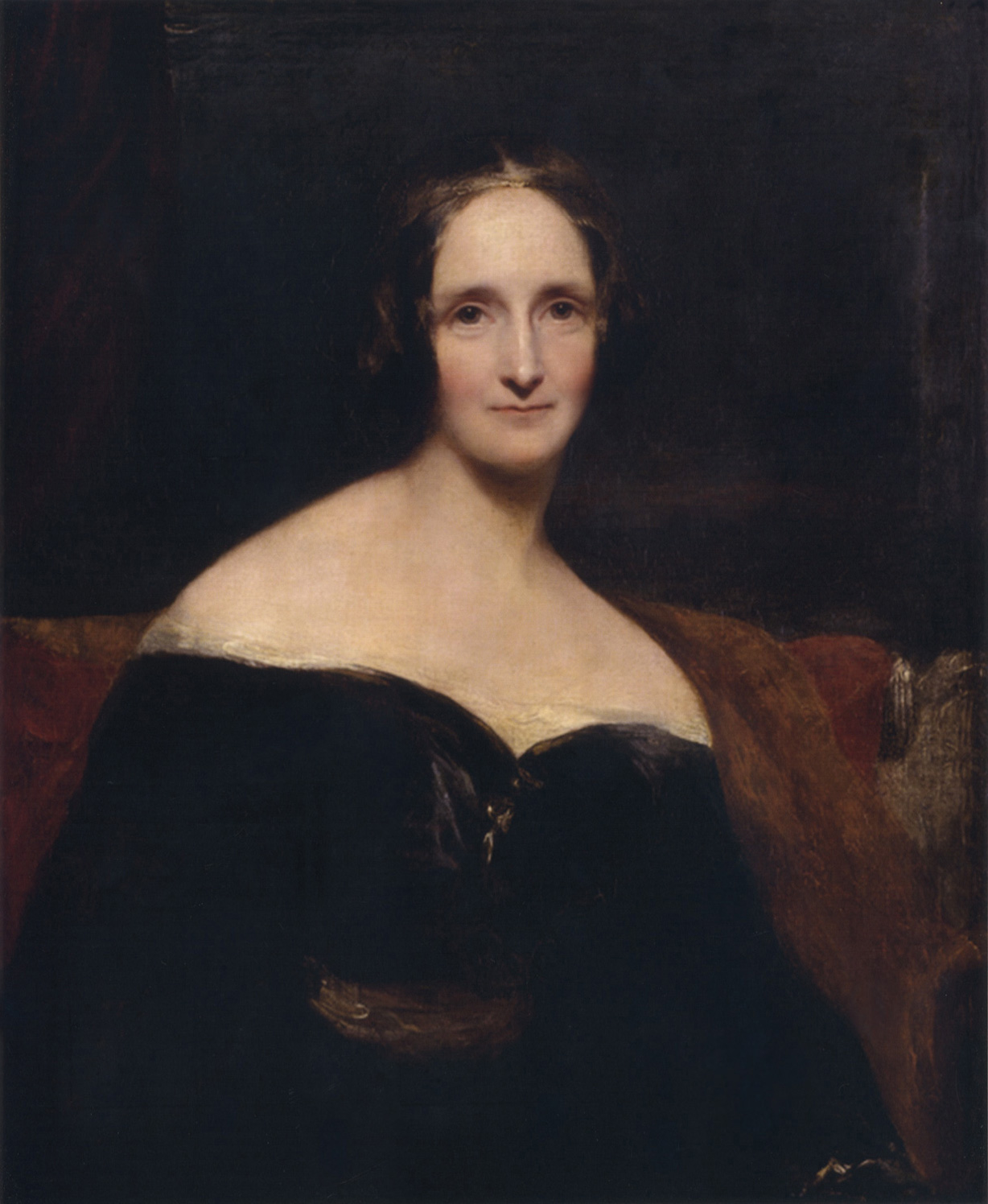
Mary Shelley

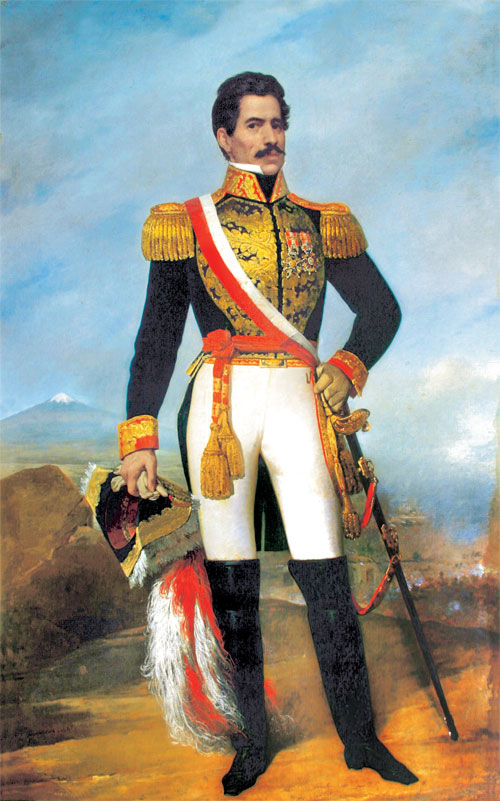
Ramón Castilla

- July 2
  - Maria Antonia Koháry de Csábrág, Hungarian noblewoman, ancestor of several European monarchs (d. 1862)
  - Pierre Joseph Michel Lorquin, French entomologist specializing in Coleoptera and Lepidoptera (d. 1873)
- July 4
  - Jacquette Löwenhielm, Swedish noble and lady-in-waiting (d. 1839)
  - James W. Parker, American pioneer, uncle of Cynthia Ann Parker and the great-uncle of Comanche Quanah Parker (d. 1864)
- July 6 – Henry Paget, 2nd Marquess of Anglesey, England (d. 1869)
- July 7 – George Meads, English professional cricketer who played first-class cricket (1825-1836) (d. 1881)
- July 11 – Francis Close, Anglican rector of Cheltenham (1826–1856) and Dean of Carlisle (1856–1881) (d. 1882)
- July 12
  - John Gaylord, early American Mormon leader (d. 1874)
  - Adele Schopenhauer, German author (d. 1849)
- July 14 – James Scott Bowerbank, British naturalist, palaeontologist (d. 1877)
- July 15
  - Kloka Anna, Swedish cunning woman, medium (d. 1860)
  - Lucius Quintus Cincinnatus Lamar I, attorney, jurist in his native Georgia (d. 1834)
  - Pier Alessandro Paravia, Venetian writer, scholar, philanthropist, professor of Italian eloquence (d. 1857)
- July 16 – Daniel D. Barnard, American politician, Representative from New York (d. 1861)
- July 17
  - Paul Delaroche, French painter (d. 1856)
  - William Matthew Harries, influential member of both houses of the Parliament of the Cape of Good Hope (d. 1865)
  - John Hodgetts-Foley, British Member of Parliament (d. 1861)
- July 18 – Robert Christison, Scottish toxicologist, physician (d. 1882)
- July 20
  - Gotthard Fritzsche, Prussian-Australian pastor (d. 1863)
  - Eli Kirk Price, Philadelphia lawyer (d. 1884)
  - Sir Paweł Strzelecki, Polish explorer, geologist (d. 1873)
- July 21 – John M. Read, American lawyer (d. 1874)
- July 24 – Maria Foote, English actress, peeress (d. 1867)
- July 25
  - Princess Augusta of Hesse-Kassel (d. 1889)
  - Nicholas Marcellus Hentz, French American educator, arachnologist (d. 1856)
  - Nehemiah Platt, American politician from New York (d. 1851)
- July 26
  - William Bulkeley Hughes, Welsh politician (d. 1882)
  - William Gore Ouseley, British diplomat serving in various roles in Washington (d. 1866)
  - William Ranwell, English marine painter (d. 1861)
- July 29
  - François Bourdon, French engineer, inventor (d. 1865)
  - Daniel Drew, American businessman (d. 1879)
  - Beverly R. Wellford, American physician (d. 1870)
- July 30 – Harriet Windsor-Clive, 13th Baroness Windsor of England (d. 1869)
- July 31 – Alonzo C. Paige, American lawyer, politician from New York (d. 1868)
- August 1
  - Joseph Gensoul, French surgeon (d. 1858)
  - William Thomas Knollys, British Army General (d. 1883)
- August 2
  - John Brown, English geographer (d. 1861)
  - William Gibson-Craig, Scottish advocate, politician (d. 1878)
  - Amédée Thierry, French journalist, historian (d. 1873)
- August 4
  - William S. Hamilton, American politician, miner (d. 1850)
  - Benjamin F. H. Witherell, Michigan jurist (d. 1867)
- August 5
  - Cayetano Heredia, Peruvian physician (d. 1861)
  - Friedrich August Kummer, German violoncellist, pedagogue and composer (d. 1879)
- August 6 – August Wilhelm Stiehler, German government official, paleobotanist (d. 1878)
- August 7
  - James Kānehoa, member of the court of King Kamehameha II and Kamehameha III during the Kingdom of Hawaii (d. 1851)
  - Justin von Linde, German jurist, statesman from the Grand Duchy of Hesse (d. 1870)
- August 8
  - George Peck, American Methodist clergyman (d. 1876)
  - Joseph-Nicolas Robert-Fleury, French painter (d. 1890)
  - George Rykert, Upper Canada businessman, surveyor and political figure (d. 1857)
  - William Walker, Quebec lawyer, political figure (d. 1844)
- August 9
  - Charles Allen, United States Representative from Massachusetts (d. 1869)
  - Charles Robert Malden, British naval officer (d. 1855)
  - Christian Wilhelm Niedner, German church historian, theologian (d. 1865)
  - Archibald Yell, American politician, Representative from Arkansas (d. 1847)
- August 10
  - Guillaume Louis Cottrau, French composer, music publisher (d. 1847)
  - Carl Gustaf Mannerheim, Finnish entomologist, governor of the Viipuri province in the Grand Duchy of Finland (d. 1854)
  - John M. Patton, Virginia politician, lawyer (d. 1858)
  - Joseph Gerhard Zuccarini, German botanist (d. 1848)
- August 11 – George Shillibeer, English coachbuilder (d. 1866)
- August 12 – Manuel Aguilar Chacón, Costa Rican head of state (d. 1846)
- August 13 – Horatio Chriesman, American surveyor, politician in Mexican Texas and participant in the Texas Revolution (d. 1878)
- August 14 – Robert Radcliffe, English first-class cricketer associated with Cambridge University (d. 1832)
- August 15 – James Black, Scottish-born Canadian clergyman (d. 1886)
- August 17 – Peter Broun, first Colonial Secretary of Western Australia (d. 1846)
- August 18 – Antoine Claudet, French photographer, artist who produced daguerreotypes (d. 1867)
- August 20
  - Johan Frederik Møller, Danish painter, photographer (d. 1882)
  - John Sinclair, Archdeacon of Middlesex (d. 1875)
  - Francesco Zantedeschi, Italian priest, physicist (d. 1873)
- August 21
  - Chauncey J. Fox, American politician from New York (d. 1883)
  - John Montagu, Indian-born Tasmanian colonial secretary (d. 1853)
  - John Iltyd Nicholl, Welsh Member of Parliament (d. 1853)
- August 22
  - Augustin-Magloire Blanchet, French Canadian Catholic prelate in the Pacific Northwest (d. 1887)
  - Thomas Dale, British priest in the Church of England, Dean of Rochester (d. 1870)
- August 23 – Adhémar Jean Claude Barré de Saint-Venant, French mechanic, mathematician (d. 1886)
- August 24
  - John Cobbold, British brewer, railway developer and Conservative Party politician (d. 1882)
  - Laufilitonga, 39th and last Tuokinai of Tonga (d. 1865)
- August 25
  - John P. Bigelow, American politician (d. 1872)
  - Henrik Hertz, Danish poet (d. 1870)
- August 26
  - Innocent of Alaska, Russian Orthodox missionary priest (d. 1879)
  - Sheldon Peck, American folk artist (d. 1869)
- August 27
  - John Bathurst Deane, South African-born English clergyman, schoolmaster, antiquary and author (d. 1887)
  - Edwin James, American botanist (d. 1861)
- August 28
  - Ferenc Duschek, Hungarian politician (d. 1872)
  - Karl Otfried Müller, German scholar, philodorian (d. 1840)
- August 30 – Mary Wollstonecraft Shelley, English novelist, dramatist, essayist, biographer and travel writer (d. 1851)
- August 31
  - Philipp von Brunnow, Russian diplomat (d. 1875)
  - Ramón Castilla, Peruvian military leader and politician, three times President of Peru (d. 1867)
  - James Ferguson, Scottish-born American astronomer and engineer (d. 1867)
- September 1 – William FitzGerald-de Ros, 23rd Baron de Ros of England (d. 1874)
- September 3 – Benjamin Nottingham Webster, English actor-manager and dramatist (d. 1882)
- September 4
  - Alvan Cullom, American politician, Representative from Tennessee (d. 1877)
  - Raynold Kaufgetz, Swiss soldier (d. 1869)
- September 5
  - Francis H. Cone, Associate Justice of the Supreme Court of Georgia (U (d. 1859)
  - John Blennerhassett Martin, American painter (d. 1857)
  - William Ruggles, professor at George Washington University (d. 1877)
- September 6
  - William Smith, lawyer, congressman, Governor of Virginia, Major General during the American Civil War (d. 1887)
  - Jenny Vertpré, French stage actress (d. 1865)
- September 7
  - Louis Vulliemin, Swiss theologian, historian (d. 1897)
  - Per Erik Wallqvist, Swedish ballet dancer, ballet master (d. 1855)
- September 10
  - Benjamin Nicolas Marie Appert, French philanthropist (d. 1847)
  - Franz Krüger, German (Prussian) painter, lithographer (d. 1857)
  - Daniel Parkhurst Leadbetter, United States Representative from Ohio (d. 1870)
  - Carl Gustaf Mosander, Swedish chemist (d. 1858)
  - Piotr Wysocki, Polish lieutenant, leader of the Polish conspiracy against Russian Tsar Nicolas I (d. 1875)
- September 11 – George Strange Boulton, Upper Canada lawyer, political figure (d. 1869)
- September 12
  - Jacob Barit, Russian Talmudist, communal worker (d. 1883)
  - George Barrell Emerson, American educator, pioneer of women's education (d. 1881)
  - Samuel Joseph May, American reformer (d. 1871)
  - Samuel McLean, United States Consul for Trinidad (d. 1881)
- September 13 – Joseph Stannard, English marine and landscape painter (d. 1830)
- September 14 – Joseph-Désiré Court, French painter of historical subjects and portraits (d. 1865)
- September 15 – Andrew Trumbo, United States Representative from Kentucky (d. 1871)
- September 16
  - Levi Silliman Ives, American theologian, bishop (d. 1867)
  - Samuel Milford, English-born Australian barrister, judge (d. 1865)
  - Anthony Panizzi, Italian-born British librarian, head of the British Museum (d. 1879)
  - Johann Friedrich Ludwig Wöhlert, German businessman (d. 1877)
- September 17
  - Eugène Defacqz, Belgian liberal politician, magistrate (d. 1871)
  - Heinrich Kuhl, German naturalist, zoologist (d. 1821)
- September 18 – Camille-Melchior Gibert, French dermatologist (d. 1866)
- September 19 – January Suchodolski, Polish painter, Army officer (d. 1875)
- September 21
  - George Hamilton Seymour, British diplomat (d. 1880)
  - John Talbot, Irish-born Canadian schoolmaster (d. 1874)
- September 23
  - Johannes Henrik Berg, Norwegian politician (d. 1886)
  - Charles Brown, Democratic member of the U.S. House of Representatives from Pennsylvania (d. 1883)
  - Thomas H. Rochester, 6th son of Colonel Nathaniel Rochester, 6th mayor of Rochester (d. 1874)
- September 24 – Carl Peter Wilhelm Gramberg, German theologian, biblical scholar (d. 1830)
- September 25 – John J. Allen, Virginia lawyer (d. 1871)
- September 26 – Olry Terquem, French pharmacist, paleontologist (d. 1887)
- September 27
  - Édouard Frère, French bookseller (d. 1874)
  - Jacob von der Lippe, Norwegian politician, Bishop of the Diocese of Christianssand (d. 1878)
- September 28
  - Sophie von Knorring, Swedish novelist, noble (d. 1848)
  - Caroline LeRoy, second wife of American author Daniel Webster (d. 1882)
  - Aimée Caroillon des Tillières, wealthy French heiress, saloniste during the July Monarchy (d. 1862)
- September 29
  - Percy Nugent, Irish politician (d. 1874)
  - Joseph Thompson, early settler of Atlanta, Georgia (d. 1885)

=== October–December ===
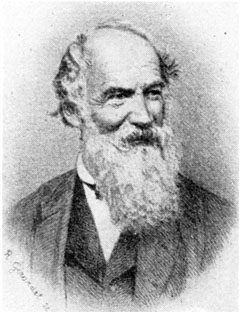
Philippe Suchard

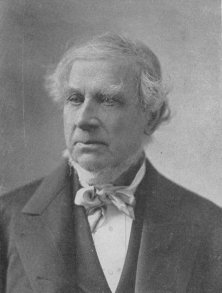
Thurlow Weed

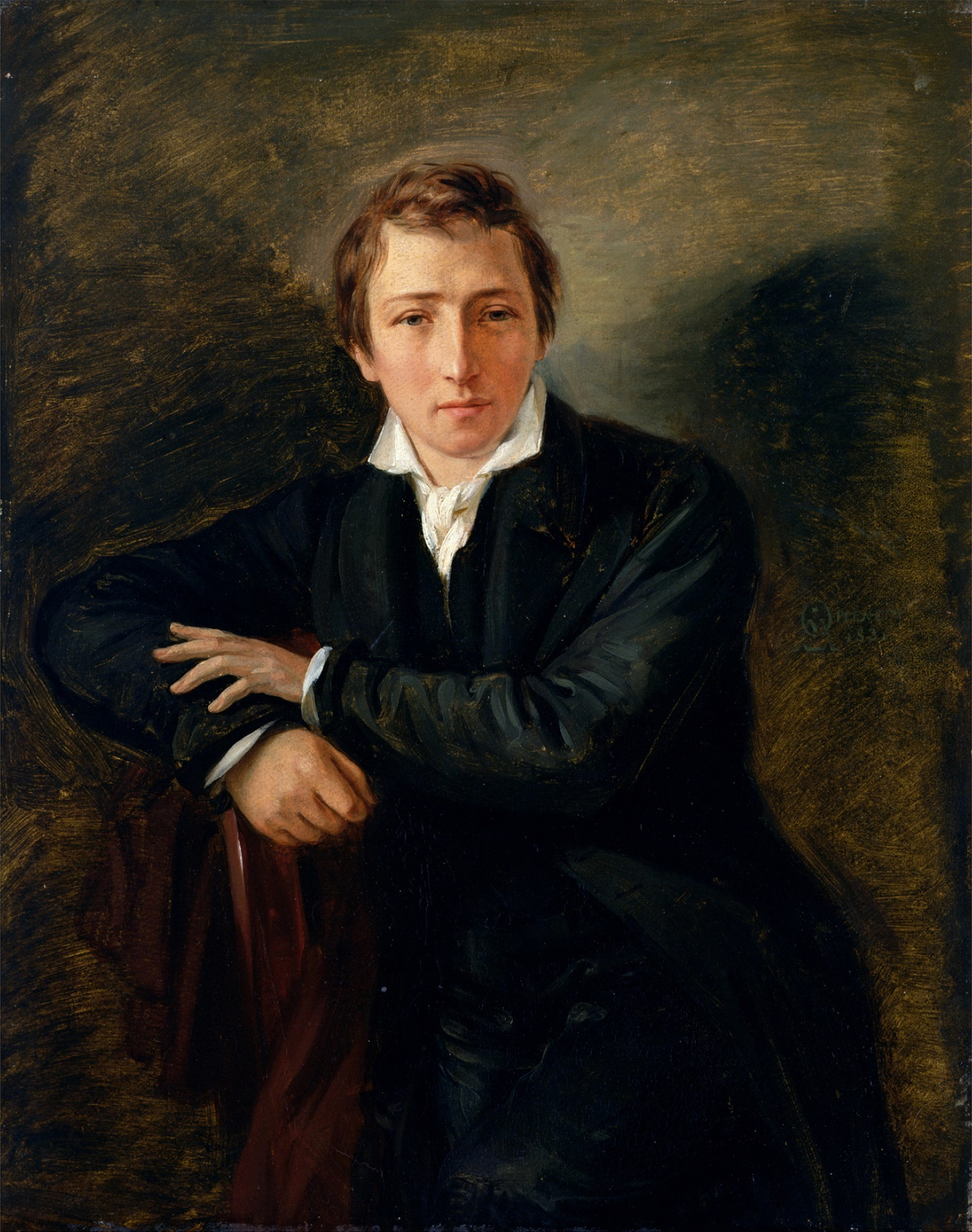
Heinrich Heine

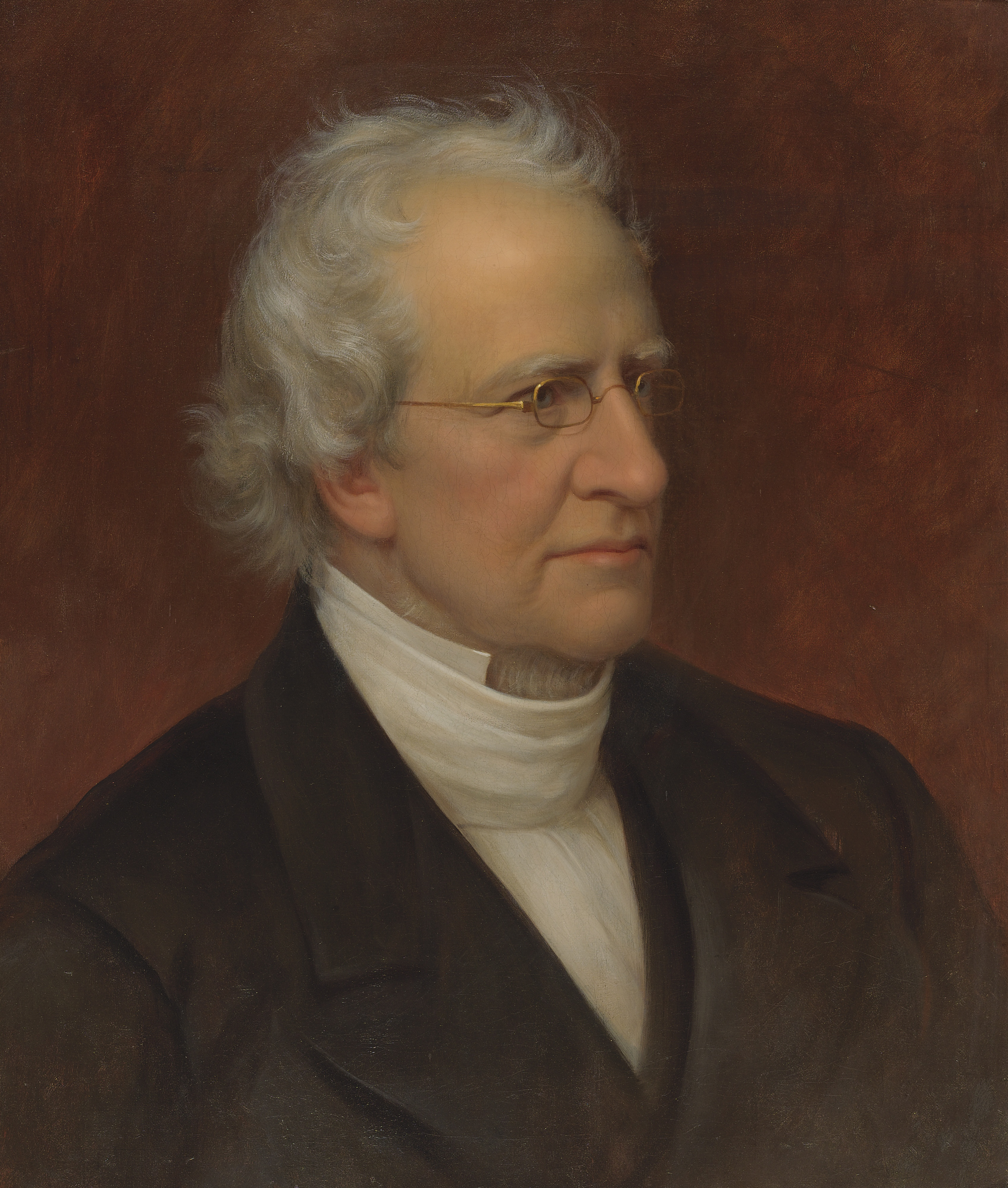
Charles Hodge

- October 1 – Lewis Ruffner, salt manufacturer from Malden, West Virginia (d. 1883)
- October 2 – Jonathan Pitney, American physician, promoter of Absecon Island as healing seashore resort (d. 1889)
- October 3
  - Knud Ibsen, father of Norwegian playwright Henrik Ibsen (d. 1877)
  - Leopold II, Grand Duke of Tuscany (d. 1870)
  - Hopkins L. Turney, Democratic United States Representative from Tennessee (d. 1857)
- October 4
  - Jeremias Gotthelf, Swiss novelist (d. 1854)
  - Charles-Séraphin Rodier, Canadian merchant (d. 1876)
- October 5 – John Gardner Wilkinson, English traveller, writer and pioneer Egyptologist (d. 1875)
- October 6
  - Albrecht Elof Ihre, Swedish diplomat, Swedish-Norwegian prime minister of foreign affairs (d. 1877)
  - Charles Panet, lawyer and political figure in Quebec (d. 1877)
  - Joseph Othmar Rauscher, Austrian Prince-Archbishop of Vienna and cardinal (d. 1875)
- October 7 – Peter Georg Bang, Danish politician, jurist (d. 1861)
- October 8
  - William H. DeLancey, American Episcopal bishop (d. 1865)
  - Ludwig Förster, German-born Austrian architect (d. 1863)
  - Charles Knapp, United States Representative from New York (d. 1880)
  - William Thomasson, United States Representative from Kentucky (d. 1882)
- October 9
  - Thomas Boutillier, Quebec doctor, political figure (d. 1861)
  - Henry Collen, English miniature portrait painter to Queen Victoria of the United Kingdom and the Duchess of Kent (d. 1879)
  - Philippe Suchard, Swiss chocolatier, industrialist (d. 1884)
- October 10
  - August Heinrich Hermann von Dönhoff, Prussian diplomat (d. 1874)
  - Thomas Drummond, British army officer, civil engineer, senior public official (d. 1840)
- October 12 – Gaspard Thémistocle Lestiboudois, French naturalist (d. 1876)
- October 13
  - George Anson, British military officer, Whig politician (d. 1857)
  - Thomas Haynes Bayly, English poet (d. 1839)
  - Dong Haichuan, Chinese martial artist, credited to be the founder of Baguazhang (d. 1882)
  - John H. McHenry, United States House of Representatives (d. 1871)
  - William Motherwell, Scottish poet, antiquary and journalist (d. 1835)
- October 14
  - Jean Crespon, French zoologist and naturalist (d. 1857)
  - Ida Laura Pfeiffer, Austrian traveler and travel book author (d. 1858)
- October 15
  - Johann Gottlieb Fleischer, German botanist and ornithologist (d. 1838)
  - Karl Wilhelm Ludwig Heyse, German philologist (d. 1855)
  - William Siborne, British officer and military historian whose most notable work was a history of the Waterloo Campaign (d. 1849)
- October 16 – James Brudenell, 7th Earl of Cardigan (d. 1868)
- October 17
  - Mario Aspa, Italian composer (d. 1868)
  - Juan Lavalle, Argentine military and political figure (d. 1841)
- October 18
  - Gallus Jacob Baumgartner, Swiss statesman and prominent federalist (d. 1869)
  - Alexandre Jacques François Brière de Boismont, French physician and psychiatrist (d. 1881)
- October 19 – Littleton Kirkpatrick, American Whig Party politician (d. 1859)
- October 20 – José Bernardo Escobar, interim President of Guatemala (d. 1849)
- October 21
  - Thomas M. Allen, clergyman who played a prominent role in establishing the Christian Church in Missouri (d. 1871)
  - William Hale, British inventor (d. 1870)
- October 23 – Jan Jacob Rochussen, Governor-General of the Dutch East Indies (d. 1871)
- October 24 – Štefan Moyses, Slovak bishop, teacher, patriot, co-founder and first chairman of Matica slovenská (d. 1869)
- October 25
  - Crispino Agostinucci, Italian Catholic bishop (d. 1856)
  - Thomas Shuldham O'Halloran, first Police Commissioner and first Police Magistrate of South Australia (d. 1870)
- October 26
  - Johann Adam Philipp Hepp, German physician, lichenologist (d. 1867)
  - Luther Severance, United States Representative, diplomat from Maine (d. 1855)
  - Antoine-Charles Taschereau, Quebec official, political figure (d. 1862)
- October 27 – Andrew Combe, Scottish physician, phrenologist (d. 1847)
- October 28 – James C. Curtis, American lawyer, politician (d. 1881)
- October 30
  - Princess Henrietta of Nassau-Weilburg (d. 1829)
  - Lott Warren, United States Representative from Georgia (U (d. 1861)
- October 31 – Benjamin H. Smith, American politician from Virginia (d. 1887)
- November 1
  - María Santos Corrales, inspiration of Peru's famous poet and patriot soldier (d. 1881)
  - Michael Loam, British (Cornish) engineer, introduced the first man engine to carry men up and down a mine shaft into the UK (d. 1871)
  - Sir Hedworth Williamson, 7th Baronet of England (d. 1861)
- November 2 – Baltazar Mathias Keilhau, Norwegian geologist, mountain pioneer (d. 1858)
- November 3 – Thomas Icely, early colonial New South Wales landholder, stockbreeder (d. 1874)
- November 4 – Carlo Blasis, Italian dancer (d. 1878)
- November 5 – Elisha H. Groves, mid-level American LDS Church leader (d. 1867)
- November 6 – Gabriel Andral, French pathologist, professor at the University of Paris (d. 1876)
- November 13 – Niklas Westring, Swedish entomologist, arachnologist (d. 1882)
- November 14
  - Moses M. Haarbleicher, German-Jewish poet, critic (d. 1869)
  - Tilghman Howard, U.S. Representative from Indiana (d. 1844)
  - Charles Lyell, Scottish geologist (d. 1875)
  - Justus Radius, German pathologist, ophthalmologist (d. 1884)
- November 15
  - Leopold von Sonnleithner, Austrian lawyer (d. 1873)
  - Thurlow Weed, New York newspaper publisher, Whig and Republican politician (d. 1882)
- November 17 – Isaac Funk, American rancher and politician (d. 1865)
- November 18 – Carl Reinhold Roth, Swedish businessman, ironmaster (d. 1858)
- November 19
  - Charles Anthon, American classical scholar (d. 1867)
  - John Crenshaw, American landowner (d. 1871)
  - Jesse Crowell, pioneer settler in Michigan (d. 1872)
- November 20
  - Mary Buckland, English palaeontologist, marine biologist and scientific illustrator (d. 1857)
  - María de los Remedios de Escalada, wife of the leader of the Argentine War of Independence (d. 1823)
- November 21 – Anders Josef Europaeus, Finnish priest, vicar (d. 1870)
- November 22 – David Salomons, leading figure in the struggle for Jewish emancipation in the United Kingdom (d. 1873)
- November 23
  - Bertram Ashburnham, 4th Earl of Ashburnham, British peer (d. 1878)
  - Benjamin Hale, American educator, clergyman (d. 1863)
- November 27 – José Xavier de Cerveira e Sousa, Portuguese prelate (d. 1862)
- November 29
  - Albert Day, American politician, 27th Lieutenant Governor of Connecticut (d. 1876)
  - Gaetano Donizetti, Italian composer (d. 1848)
- November 30
  - Pierre-Martial Bardy, Lower Canada teacher, doctor and political figure (d. 1860)
  - Otto Vincent Lange, Norwegian politician (d. 1870)
- December 2 – Benjamin F. Hallett, Massachusetts lawyer, Democratic Party activist (d. 1862)
- December 3
  - Margaretta Morris, American entomologist (d. 1867)
  - Andrew Smith, Scottish surgeon, explorer, ethnologist and zoologist (d. 1872)
- December 4
  - Thomas Patterson Brockman, member of South Carolina Senate and House of Representatives (d. 1859)
  - George Tupou I, King of Tonga (d. 1893)
- December 5
  - Steen Andersen Bille, Danish vice-admiral and minister for the navy (d. 1883)
  - Eugène Soubeiran, French scientist (d. 1859)
- December 6
  - Károly Nagy, Hungarian astronomer (d. 1868)
  - Antoinette Henriette Clémence Robert, French writer of historical fiction (d. 1872)
- December 7 – Charles J. McCurdy, American lawyer (d. 1891)
- December 8 – Martin Martens, Belgian botanist, chemist (d. 1863)
- December 9
  - Michael Aikman, Lower Canada businessman, political figure (d. 1881)
  - Thomas Davee, United States Representative from Maine (d. 1841)
- December 10 – Raffaele Fidanza, Italian painter (d. 1846)
- December 11
  - Alfred Dockery, American Representative from North Carolina (d. 1875)
  - Hiram Paulding, Rear Admiral in the United States Navy (d. 1878)
- December 12
  - Lucy Anderson, English pianist (d. 1878)
  - Pierre Léonard Vander Linden, Belgian entomologist (d. 1831)
- December 13 – Heinrich Heine, German poet (d. 1856)
- December 14
  - Antonio Maria Cagiano de Azevedo, Catholic Cardinal, holder of significant legal positions in the church (d. 1867)
  - Emil Huschke, German anatomist, embryologist (d. 1858)
- December 15
  - Karl Friedrich Theodor Krause, German anatomist (d. 1868)
  - Joseph Lecompte, United States Representative from Kentucky (d. 1851)
  - Erik Røring Møinichen, Norwegian politician (d. 1875)
  - Andrew Tracy, American politician (d. 1868)
- December 17
  - Richard Cheslyn, English amateur cricketer who played first-class cricket (1825-1846) (d. 1858)
  - Joseph Henry, American scientist (d. 1878)
- December 18
  - August Friedrich Wilhelm Forchhammer, jurist, historian from the Duchy of Schleswig (d. 1870)
  - Dirk van Hogendorp, Dutch jurist (d. 1845)
- December 19 – Antoine Louis Dugès, French obstetrician, naturalist (d. 1838)
- December 22
  - Charles Fox, English Quaker scientist (d. 1878)
  - Thomas Manders, English actor-manager and low comedian (d. 1859)
  - William Benjamin Robinson, Upper Canada fur trader and political figure (d. 1873)
- December 23 – Adrien-Henri de Jussieu, French botanist (d. 1853)
- December 24
  - Robert Irwin Jr., American pioneer, territorial legislator (d. 1833)
  - Lewis Jones, British Royal Navy officer (d. 1895)
- December 25
  - Bernard Donald Macdonald, second Bishop of the Roman Catholic Diocese of Charlottetown, Prince Edward Island (d. 1859)
  - Joseph-Marie Quérard, French bibliographer (d. 1865)
- December 26
  - Enoch Cobb, Massachusetts farmer, businessman, philanthropist (d. 1876)
  - Johann Gustav Heckscher, German politician (d. 1865)
  - Thomas M. Pettit, United States lawyer (d. 1853)
  - Hans Skramstad, Norwegian pianist and composer (d. 1839)
- December 27
  - Mirza Beg Asadullah Khan (Mirza Ghalib), Indian poet (d.1868)
  - Domitila de Castro, Marchioness of Santos (d. 1867)
  - Charles Hodge, Presbyterian theologian, principal of Princeton Theological Seminary (1851-1878) (d. 1878)
  - Manuela Sáenz, Colombian national heroine (d. 1856)
- December 28
  - Rodolphus Dickinson, United States Representative from Ohio (d. 1849)
  - John Marshall, English politician (d. 1836)
- December 29 – François Leuret, French anatomist, psychiatrist (d. 1851)
- approximate date – Sojourner Truth, African-American abolitionist, women's rights activist (d. 1883)

== Deaths ==
=== January–March ===
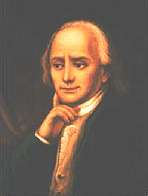
Francis Lightfoot Lee

- January 11 – Francis Lightfoot Lee, member of the House of Burgesses in the Colony of Virginia (b. 1734)
- January 13 – Elisabeth Christine of Brunswick-Wolfenbüttel-Bevern, queen consort of Prussia (b. 1715)
- January 19 – David Graeme, British Army general (b. 1716)
- January 26 – Antão de Almada, 12th Count of Avranches (b. 1718)
- January 30 – John Glover, American military general, fisherman and merchant (b. 1732)
- February 1 – James Duane, American lawyer (b. 1733)
- February 8 – Princess Joséphine of Lorraine (b. 1753)
- February 11 – Antoine Dauvergne, French composer (b. 1713)
- February 13 – Sir Robert Burdett, 4th Baronet, British politician and member of the English gentry (b. 1716)
- February 17 – Maria Anna Sophia of Saxony, daughter of King Augustus III of Poland (b. 1728)
- February 21 – John Parkhurst, English academic (b. 1728)
- February 22 – Karl Friedrich Hieronymus Freiherr von Münchhausen, German officer and adventurer (b. 1720)
- March 2 – Horace Walpole, English politician and writer (b. 1717)
- March 5 – Empress Xiaoshurui, first Empress Consort of the Jiaqing Emperor of the Qing Dynasty (b. 1760)
- March 7
  - John Gabriel Stedman, British–Dutch colonial soldier and author (b. 1744)
  - Johann Heinrich Samuel Formey, German writer (b. 1711)
- March 16 – Cristina Roccati, Italian scholar in physics (b. 1732)
- March 17 – Daniel Dulany the Younger, Maryland Loyalist politician (b. 1722)
- March 26 – James Hutton, Scottish geologist (b. 1726)
- March 30 – Pierre Jean Van Stabel, French rear-admiral (b. 1744)
- March 31
  - Olaudah Equiano, Nigerian ex-slave, abolitionist (b. c. 1746)
  - Elizabeth Washington Lewis, younger sister of George Washington, the only sister to live to adulthood (b. 1733)

=== April–June ===
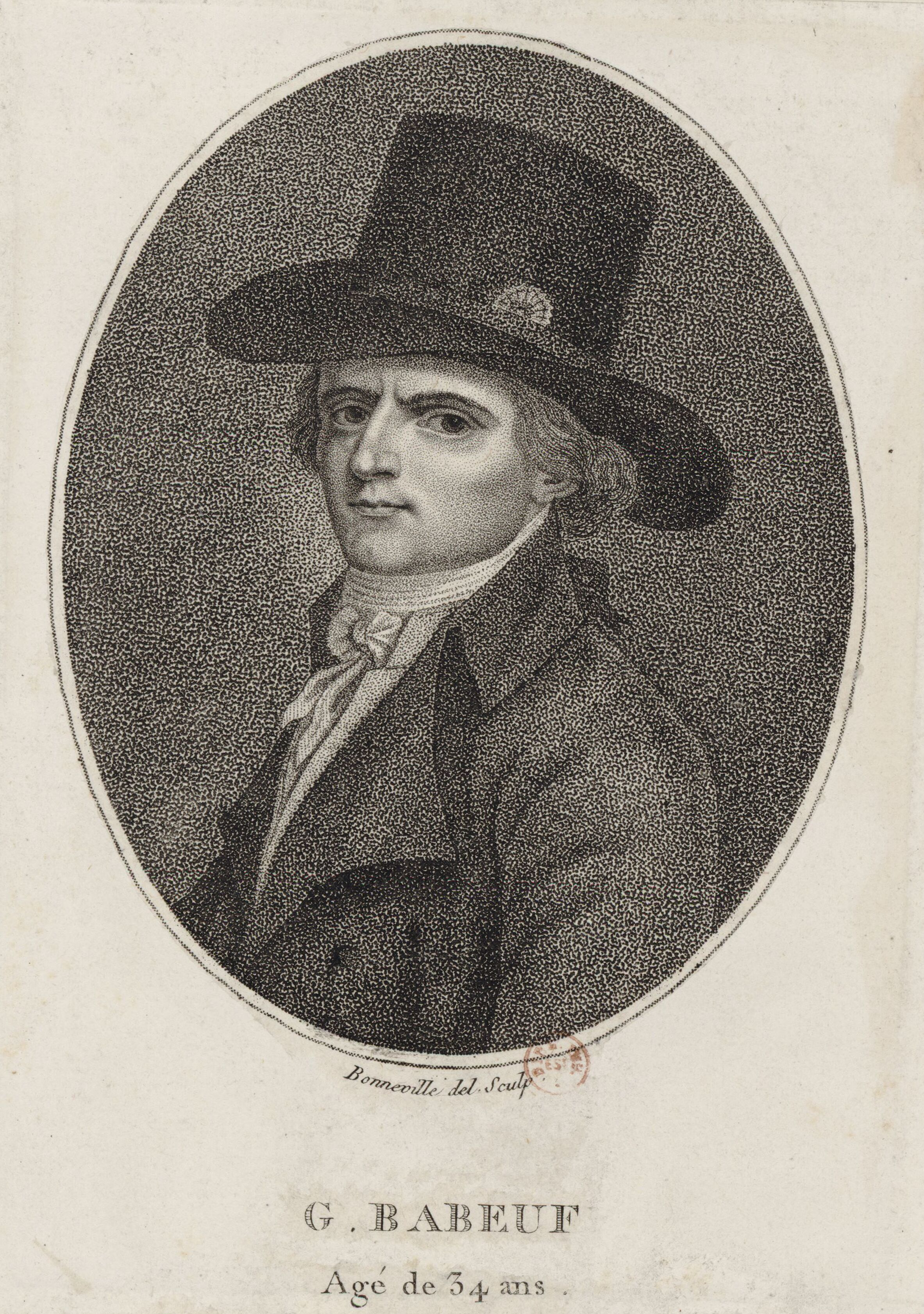
François-Noël Babeuf

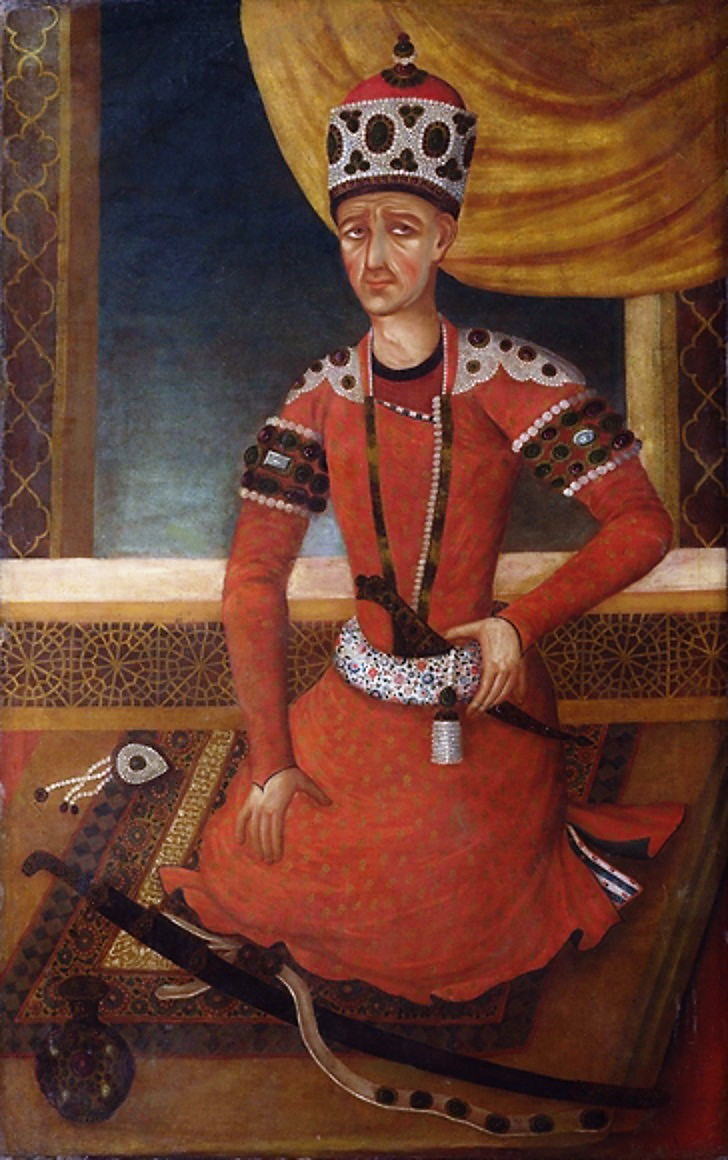
Agha Mohammad Khan Qajar

- April 4 – Pierre-François Berruer, French sculptor (b. 1733)
- April 17 – Susanna Boylston, prominent early-American socialite (b. 1708)
- April 27 – Henry Louis, Prince of Nassau-Saarbrücken, titular prince of Nassau-Saarbrücken (b. 1768)
- April 29 – Elizabeth Ryves, Irish writer, translator (b. 1750)
- May 7 – Jedediah Strutt, English hosier and cotton spinner from Belper (b. 1726)
- May 14 – Giovanni Fagnano, Italian churchman and mathematician (b. 1715)
- May 17 – Michel-Jean Sedaine, French dramatist (b. 1719)
- May 25
  - Andrew Elliot, acting colonial governor of the Province of New York (b. 1728)
  - John Griffin, 4th Baron Howard de Walden, British field marshal (b. 1719)
- May 27
  - François-Noël Babeuf, French revolutionary leader (executed) (b. 1760)
  - Augustin Alexandre Darthé, French revolutionary leader (executed) (b. 1769)
- June 15 – Christen Friis Rottbøll, Danish physician, botanist and pupil of Carolus Linnaeus (b. 1727)
- June 17
  - Agha Mohammad Khan Qajar, founder of the Qajar dynasty of Iran (b. 1742)
  - Mohammad Khan Qajar, Iranian king (b. 1742)
- June 21 – Andreas Peter Bernstorff, Danish statesman, politician (b. 1735)
- June 24 – Bahadur Shah of Nepal, younger son of King Prithvi Narayan Shah (1723–1775) of modern Nepal (b. 1757)
- June 30
  - Welbore Ellis Doyle, third Military Governor of British Ceylon (b. 1758)
  - Richard Parker, English sailor executed for his role as president of the so-called "Floating Republic" (b. 1767)

=== July–September ===
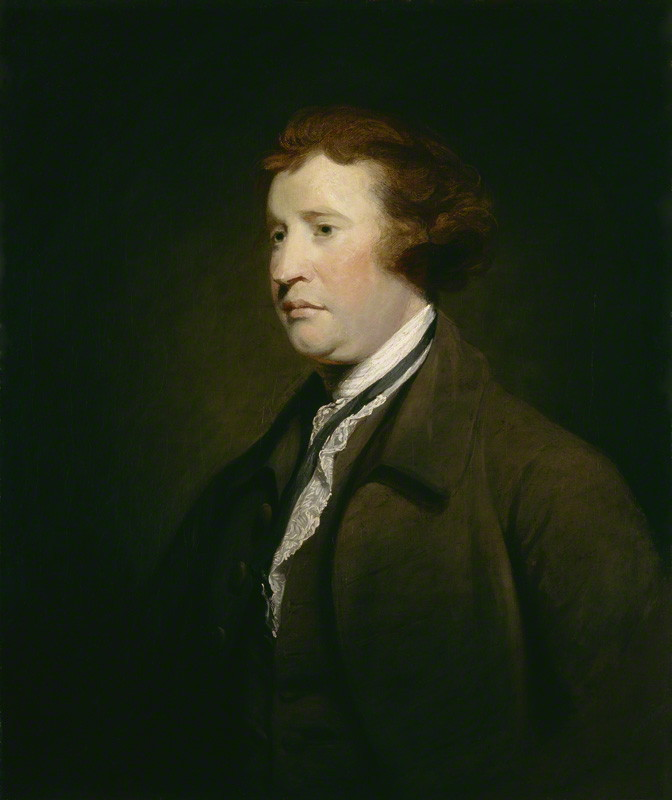
Edmund Burke

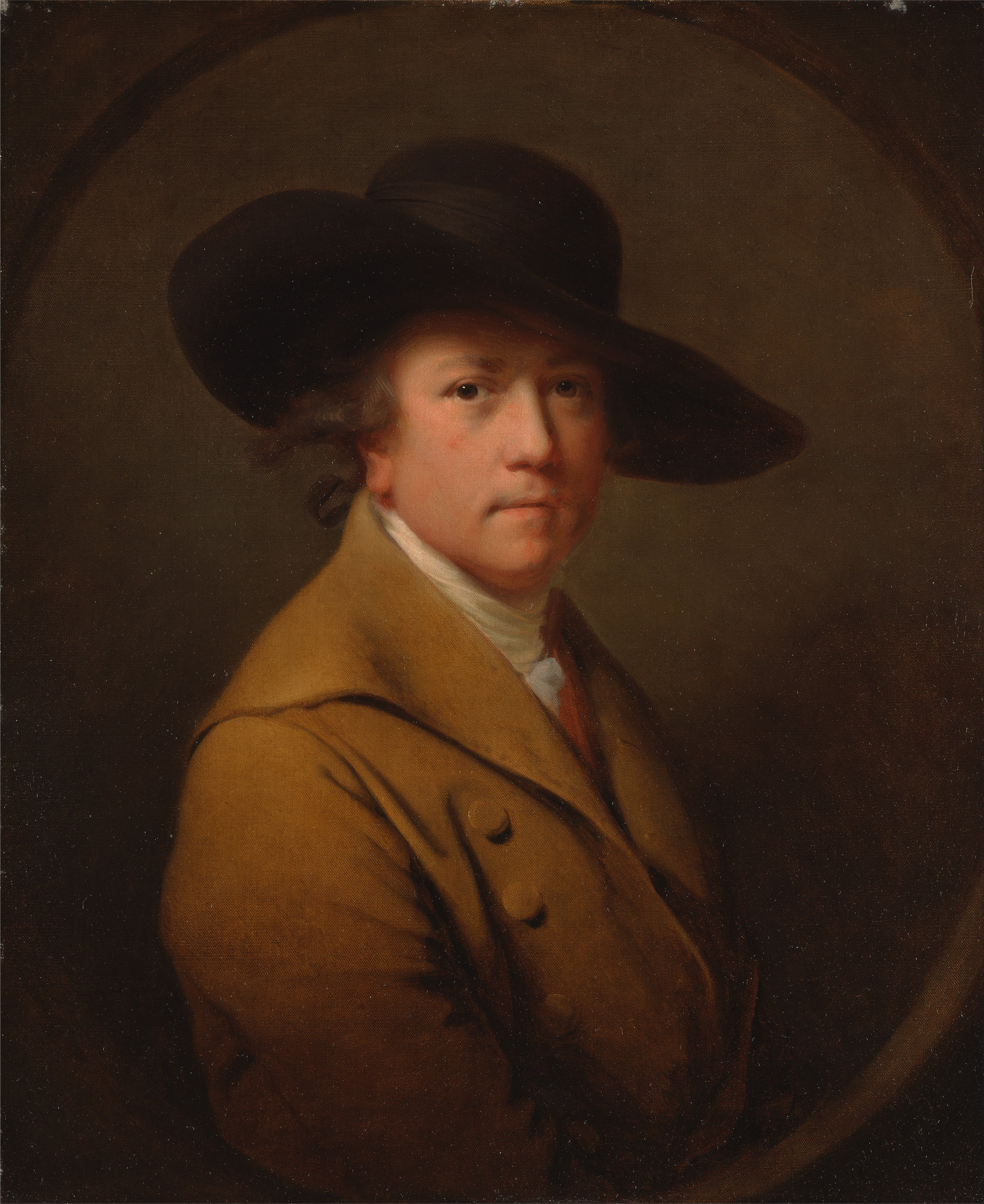
Joseph Wright of Derby

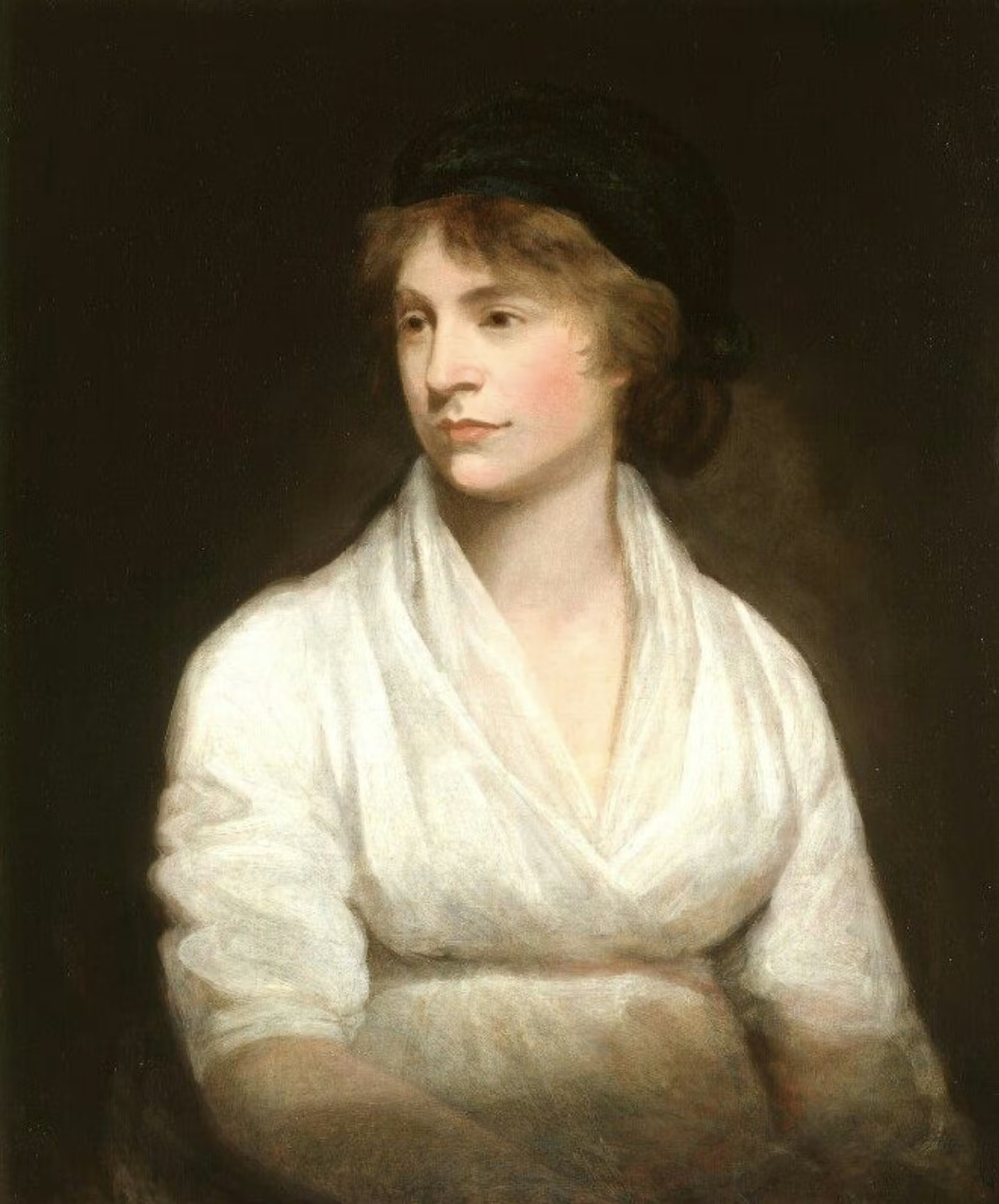
Mary Wollstonecraft

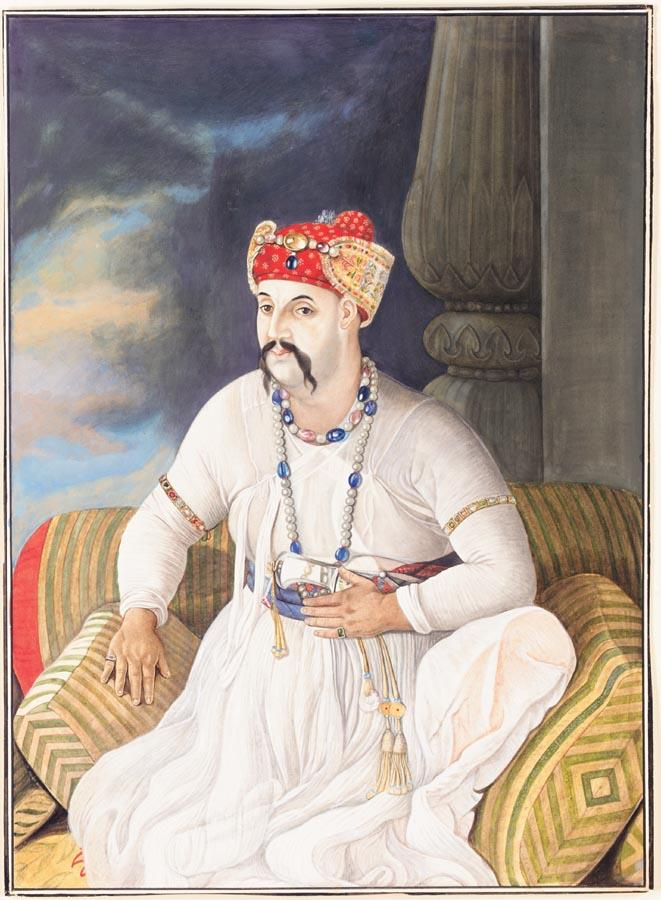
Asaf-ud-Daula

- July 9 – Edmund Burke, Irish philosopher (b. 1723)
- July 11 – Ienăchiță Văcărescu, Wallachian writer (b. 1740)
- July 12 – Peter Bonnevaux, fourth Military Governor of British Ceylon, third General Officer Commanding (b. 1752)
- July 14 – Emmanuel de Rohan-Polduc, member of the wealthy and influential Rohan family of France (b. 1725)
- July 25
  - Richard Bowen, officer of the Royal Navy during the American War of Independence and the French Revolutionary Wars (b. 1761)
  - George Thorp, officer of the British Royal Navy during the French Revolutionary Wars (b. 1777)
- July 29 – John Weatherhead, officer of the British Royal Navy (b. 1775)
- August 3
  - August 3 – Jeffrey Amherst, 1st Baron Amherst, British soldier and conqueror of Quebec (b. 1717)
  - James Davenport, American lawyer (b. 1758)
- August 6 – James Pettit Andrews, English historian, antiquary (b. 1737)
- August 10 – Alexei Senyavin, Russian admiral (b. 1716)
- August 22 – Dagobert Sigmund von Wurmser, Alsatian-born Austrian general (b. 1724)
- August 25 – Thomas Chittenden, first governor of the state of Vermont (b. 1730)
- August 29 – Joseph Wright of Derby, English landscape and portrait painter (b. 1734)
- September 4 – Sir William Ashburnham, 4th Baronet, Church of England clergyman, baronet (b. 1710)
- September 10 – Mary Wollstonecraft, English feminist author (b. 1759)
- September 12 – David Forman, brigadier general of New Jersey militia (b. 1745)
- September 19
  - Samuel Enderby, English whale oil merchant known for sponsoring Arctic exploration (b. 1719)
  - Lazare Hoche, French soldier who rose to be general of the Revolutionary army (b. 1768)
- September 21
  - Asaf-ud-Daula, nawab wazir of Oudh (b. 1748)
  - Hugh Pigot, British Royal Navy officer (b. 1769)
- September 25 – John Baughan, English carpenter, thief and transportee to Australia (b. 1754)
- September 30 – Gunning Bedford Sr., American lawyer and politician from New Castle (b. 1742)

=== October–December ===
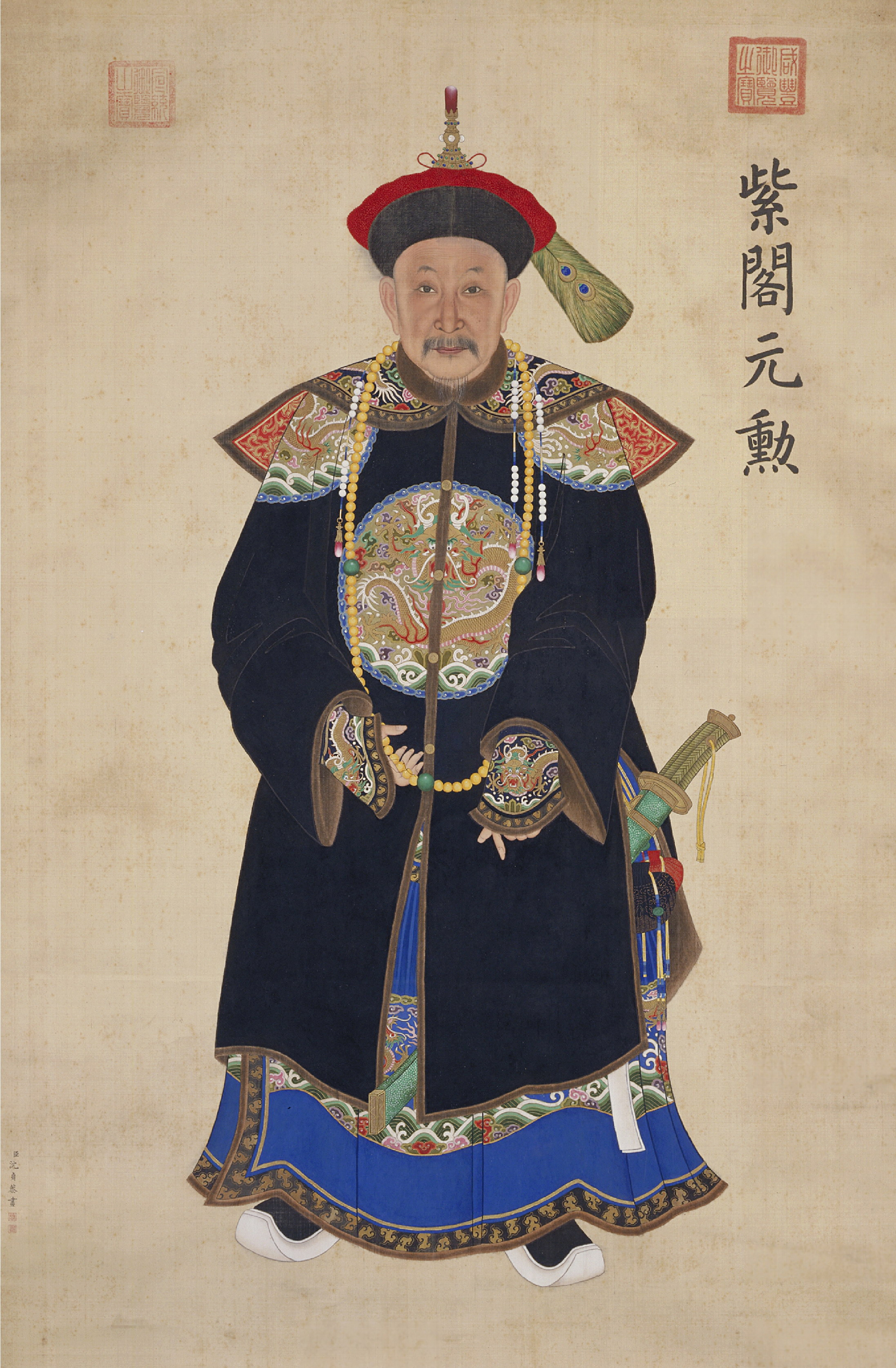
Agui

- October 9 – Vilna Gaon, Lithuanian rabbi (b. 1720)
- October 10
  - Agui, Manchu noble general for the Qing dynasty (b. 1717)
  - Carter Braxton, signer of the United States Declaration of Independence, merchant, planter, Virginia politician (b. 1736)
- October 14 – William Orr, member of the United Irishmen (executed) (b. 1766)
- October 17 – Jean-François Hubert, bishop of Quebec (b. 1739)
- October 20 – William Cooke, English cleric, academic (b. 1711)
- November 14 – Ivan Shuvalov, founder of Moscow University (b. 1727)
- November 16 – King Frederick William II of Prussia (b. 1744)
- November 18 – Jacques-Alexandre Laffon de Ladebat, French shipbuilder, merchant (b. 1719)
- November 26 – Andrew Adams, American lawyer (b. 1736)
- November 27 – Johann Baptist Wendling, Alsatian-born flute player, composer of the Mannheim School (b. 1723)
- November 29 – Samuel Langdon, American Congregational clergyman, President of Harvard University (b. 1723)
- December 1 – Oliver Wolcott, American politician (b. 1726)
- December 11 – Richard Brocklesby, English physician (b. 1722)
- December 13 – Louis Legendre, French politician of the Revolution period (b. 1752)
- December 23
  - Frederick II Eugene, Duke of Württemberg (b. 1732)
  - Solomon Southwick, Newport, Rhode Island printer, newspaper publisher (b. 1731)
- December 26 – John Wilkes, English radical (b. 1725)
- December 30 – David Martin, British painter, engraver (b. 1737)
- Date unknown
  - Joseph Ferrers, English Carmelite friar.
  - Wang Zhenyi, Chinese astronomer
