= Robert Radcliffe =

Robert Radcliffe may refer to:

- Robert Radcliffe of Hunstanton (died 1497), English landowner
- Robert Radcliffe, 1st Earl of Sussex (c. 1483–1542), courtier and soldier
- Robert Radclyffe, 5th Earl of Sussex (1573–1629), English peer
- Robert Radcliffe (cricketer) (1797–1832), English cricketer

== See also ==
- Bobby Radcliff
- Bob Radcliffe, namesake of the Bob Radcliffe Cup
