= James Black (clergyman) =

Scottish clergyman (1797–1886)

- Born: 15 August 1797; Scotland
- Died: 21 April 1886 (aged 88)

James Black (15 August 1797 – 21 April 1886) was born in Scotland and immigrated to Canada with his parents in 1820.

Black had been influenced in Scotland by a new Scottish Baptist movement. He began teaching and preaching in Aldborough Township, Upper Canada.

James Black was a founder of the Disciples of Christ in Upper Canada. He was active in many activities concerning evangelistic work. For example, he supported the efforts of the British and Foreign Bible Society. He was chairman of a Canadian auxiliary to the American Bible Union for a time.
