= Jean Crespon =

French zoologist and naturalist (1797–1857)

Jean Crespon (14 October 1797, Nîmes – 1 August 1857) was a French zoologist and naturalist.

Born into a poor family, he worked as a barber, soldier, and poet before becoming a taxidermist and turning to natural history. In 1840 he published his Ornithologie du Gard et des pays circonvoisins (Ornithology of Gard and Environs), a book that covered 321 species of birds. The book earned the praise of naturalists that included Isidore Geoffroy Saint-Hilaire (1805–1861).

In 1844 Crespon published the two-volume La Faune méridionale (Mediterranean Wildlife), in which he described 27 new species.

Crespon's natural history collections passed to the Muséum d'histoire naturelle in Nîmes on his death.

== Works about Jean Crespon ==
- "Nos ornithologistes. Jean Crespon, 1797-1857," by Albert Hugues (Garnier-Chaboussant, 1922).
