= Johann Adam Pupikofer =

Swiss historian (1797–1882)

Johann Adam Pupikofer (17 March 1797 – 28 July 1882) was a Swiss historian, from 1861 curator of the Thurgau cantonal archive in Frauenfeld.

Pupikofer is known for his History of Thurgau (published in two volumes 1828, 1830). He also authored a large number of smaller publications dealing with the history of Thurgau and the Lake Constance region. In 1872 he received an honorary doctoral degree from the University of Zurich. Pupikofer was a close friend of German antiquary Joseph von Laßberg.

== General references ==
- Erich Trösch: "Pupikofer, Johann Adam" in German, French and Italian in the online Historical Dictionary of Switzerland.
- Hans Ulrich Wepfer: Johann Adam Pupikofer (1797–1882). In: Thurgauische Beiträge zur vaterländischen Geschichte, Bd. 106 (1969), S. 3–204.
- Gerold Meyer von Knonau (1888). "Pupikofer, Johann Adam" . Allgemeine Deutsche Biographie (in German). Vol. 26. Leipzig: Duncker & Humblot. pp. 710–712.
