= Moses M. Haarbleicher =

German-Jewish poet and critic

Moses M. Haarbleicher (14 November 1797, Hamburg — 25 September 1869, Hamburg) was a German-Jewish poet and critic. Following the example of his father, the founder of the Jewish School of Hamburg, and under the influence of his guardian, the father of Gabriel Riesser, he interested himself early in the affairs of the Jews.

He took an active part in the establishment of the Tempelverein, being one of the collaborators in the revision of its prayer-book; and he founded the Verein zur Beförderung Nützlicher Gewerbe unter den Juden, which he directed from 1823 to 1840, when he became secretary of the congregation of Hamburg. Possessing knowledge of Romance and Germanic languages, and writing with ease in Hebrew, he was an acute and clever critic. Forty of his songs and poems are contained in the hymn-book of the Hamburg congregation. His poem "Hagbahah" was often ascribed to Gabriel Riesser. Some years prior to his death he published the first part of Zwei Epochen aus der Gesch. der Deutsch-Israelitischen Gemeinde in Hamburg (Hamburg, 1866), a valuable work which remained unfinished.
