= John Gaylord =

American Mormon leader (1797–1874)

First Seven Presidents of the Seventy
- April 6, 1837 – January 13, 1838
- Called by: Joseph Smith, Jr.
- End reason: Excommunicated for apostasy

Personal details
- Born: John C. Gaylord; July 12, 1797; Pennsylvania, United States
- Died: July 17, 1874 (aged 77); Burlington, Wisconsin, United States

John C. Gaylord (July 12, 1797 – July 17, 1874) was an early Mormon leader and member of the Presidency of the Seventy of the Church of Jesus Christ of Latter Day Saints.

Gaylord was born in 1797, in Pennsylvania, to the family of Chauncey Gaylord. Ordained a seventy December 20, 1836, by Hazen Aldrich; he was installed as one of the Seven Presidents of Seventies on April 6, 1837, by Sidney Rigdon and Hyrum Smith. He replaced Sylvester Smith.

On January 13, 1838, Gaylord was excommunicated from the church along with several others. Gaylord was embittered over the failure of the Kirtland Safety Society. Henry Harriman took his place in the Presidency.

Gaylord rejoined with the church in Nauvoo, Illinois in 1839 and was rebaptized in 1841. He later received his endowment in the Nauvoo Temple.

In 1844 the death of Joseph Smith, Jr., the leader of the Latter Day Saint movement, led to a succession crisis where several people came forward to establish themselves as the new religious leader. Although Brigham Young led a large group of Mormons west to Utah, Gaylord followed James J. Strang in Voree, Wisconsin. After Strang's death, Gaylord became a seventy in the Reorganized Church of Jesus Christ of Latter Day Saints in 1858. He died near Burlington, Wisconsin in 1874 at the age of 77.
