= Justin von Linde =

German jurist and statesman

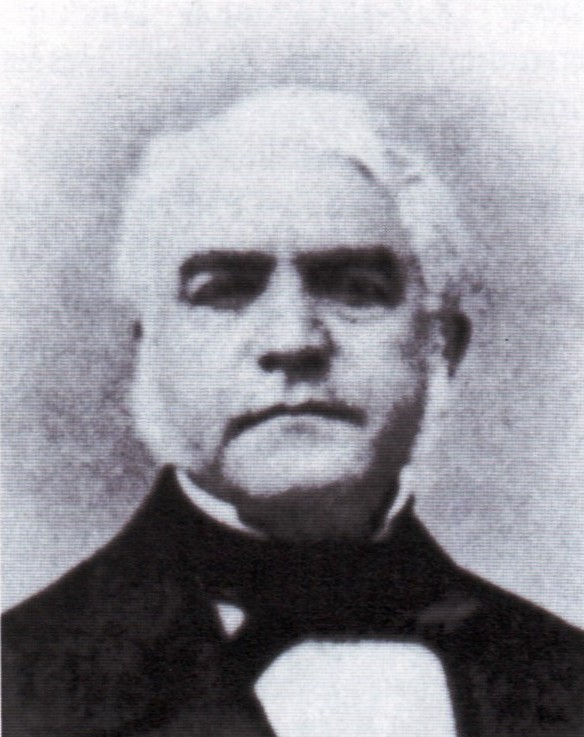
Justin von Linde.

Justin von Linde (7 August 1797, Brilon – 9 June 1870) was a German jurist and statesman from the Grand Duchy of Hesse.
