= Justus Radius =

German pathologist and ophthalmologist

Justus Wilhelm Martin Radius (14 November 1797, in Leipzig – 7 March 1884, in Leipzig) was a German pathologist and ophthalmologist.

He obtained his medical doctorate in Leipzig in 1821, then furthered his education in Vienna, Berlin, London and Paris. In 1825 he became an associate professor for pathology in Leipzig, and in the meantime performed duties as a "free-lance" eye physician. In 1840 he was appointed professor of pathology, hygiene and pharmacology.

In Leipzig, he also served as a physician at St. Georg Hospital (1825–53), and in 1843, following the death of Johann Christian August Heinroth, he was given additional duties as a "part-time chair" of psychiatry. From 1829 to 1861, he was director of the Medizinischen Gesellschaft zu Leipzig.

In 1887 a new building for the Leipzig Conservatory was constructed by way of a donation from Radius. In 1910, the Radiusstraße, a thoroughfare in the Lindenau district of Leipzig, was named after him and his wife, Wilhelmine.

== Selected works ==
- Bemerkungen über den Salzbrunn und Altwasser, Leipzig 1830 - Remarks on Salzbrunn and Altwasser.
- Beiträge zur praktischen Heilkunde, Leipzig 1834–1841 (with Johann Christian August Clarus) - Contribution to practical medicine.
- Handwörterbuch der Chirurgie und Augenheilkunde, six volumes, Leipzig 1836–1840 (with Wilhelm Walther and Michael Jaeger) - Dictionary of surgery and ophthalmic medicine.
- Geschichtliche Skizze des Georgenhospitals als Heilanstalt, Leipzig 1851 - Historical sketch of St. Georg Hospital and sanatorium.
- "Scriptores ophthalmologici minores", Leipzig.
