= George Meads =

English cricketer

George Meads (7 July 1797 at Lindfield, Sussex – 30 July 1881 at Brighton, Sussex) was an English professional cricketer who played from 1825 to 1836. He was mainly associated with Sussex and made 14 known appearances in important matches.

== Bibliography ==
- Arthur Haygarth, Scores & Biographies, Volume 1-2 (1744–1840), Lillywhite, 1862
