= Raffaele Fidanza =

Italian painter (1797–1846)

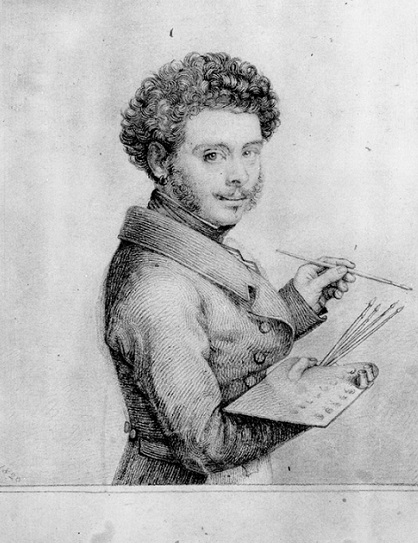
Self-portrait, pencil on paper, 19 x 15 cm., Municipal Art Gallery Raffaele Fidanza, Matelica

Raffaele Fidanza (10 December 1797 – 23 November 1846) was an Italian painter, active in a neoclassical style.

He trained under Vincenzo Camuccini and Francesco Podesti. His paintings and portraits are now placed in the Pinacoteca “Raffaele Fidanza” di Matelica in the second floor of the Palazzo Ottoni of Matelica, where he was born.
