= Hans Skramstad =

Norwegian pianist and composer

Hans Skramstad (26 December 1797 – 15 June 1839) was a Norwegian pianist and composer.

== Music ==
- Brilliant variations on "Stusle sundagskvelden" for piano
