= Johann Hermann Kufferath =

German composer (1797–1864)

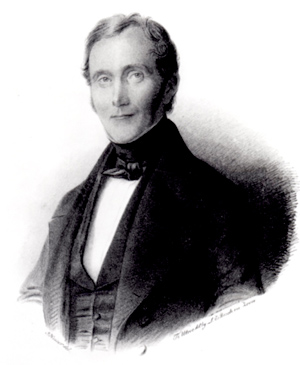
Johann Hermann Kufferath (c. 1835)

Johann Hermann Kufferath (12 May 1797 – 28 July 1864) was a German composer.

== Life ==
Born in Mülheim an der Ruhr, he was the eldest son of watchmaker Carl Kufferath and his wife Catharina née Horst, born in Mülheim an der Ruhr. He and six of his brothers possessed an unusual musical talent, and they were referred to by contemporaries as the "musical Pleiades" (a constellation of seven bright stars).

A pupil of Louis Spohr and Moritz Hauptmann, he was music director in Bielefeld from 1823 and municipal director of music in Utrecht from 1830. He wrote cantatas, overtures, motets and a chant textbook.

Kufferath was married to soprano Elisabeth Sophie Reintjes. He died in Wiesbaden on July 28, 1864.

== See also ==
- Jacques Offenbach
