= Joseph Ferrers =

English friar (1725–1797)

Joseph Ferrers (1725–1797), was an English Carmelite friar.

Ferrers was probably descended from a younger branch of the family of that name seated at Baddesley Clinton in Warwickshire. He was professed in one of the foreign convents in 1745, and ordained priest in 1749, after which he came on the English mission. He became provincial of the English Carmelites, and died in London 29 August 1797, aged 72. He published ‘A Discourse pronounced … in the Chapel of his Excellency the Neapolitan Ambassador, in the Solemn Service celebrated 9 February 1793 for Louis XVI, late King of France. In French and English,’ 8vo, London, 1793.
