= Albert Seerig =

German surgeon and anatomist

Albert Wilhelm Hermann Seerig (26 April 1797 in Rudolstadt – 7 March 1862 in Königsberg) was a German surgeon and anatomist.

He studied medicine at the universities of Jena, Berlin and Breslau, where he also served as an anatomical prosector. In 1826 he became an associate professor at Breslau, then in 1836 relocated to the University of Königsberg as a full professor of surgery. In 1839/40 he served as rector at the university.

== Published works ==
He was the author of the two-part "Anatomische Demonstrationen, oder Sammlung kolossaler Abbildungen aus dem Gebiete der medicinischen Anatomie" (1830–32) that was later translated into English and published as "Anatomical demonstrations, or, Colossal illustrations of human anatomy" (1831–32). Other noteworthy published works by Seerig include:

- De hydroencephaloceles specimine eximio, 1822 (dissertation thesis).
- Über angeborene Verwachsung der Finger und Zehen und Ueberzahl derselben, 1824 – On congenital deformities of the fingers and toes, etc.
- Nonnulla de fungi durae matris origine et diagnosi, 1825.
- Armamentarium chirurgicum; oder, Möglichst vollständige Sammlung von Abbildungen und Beschreibung chirurgischer Instrumente älterer und neuerer Zeit (2 volumes, 1835–38) – Armamentarium chirurgicum, or as complete as possible collection of illustrations and descriptions of surgical instruments from ancient and modern times.
