= Johannes Henrik Berg =

Norwegian politician

Johannes Henrik Berg (23 September 1797 – 12 September 1886) was a Norwegian politician.

He was elected to the Norwegian Parliament in 1854 and 1857, representing the constituency of Fredriksstad. He worked as both stipendiary magistrate (byfoged) and town clerk (byskriver) in that city. He served those two terms in parliament.
