= Enoch Cobb =

American businessman (1797–1876)

Enoch T. Cobb
- Born: December 26, 1797; Barnstable, Massachusetts
- Died: February 26, 1876 (aged 78); Barnstable, Massachusetts
- Occupations: Farmer, businessman
- Known for: Philanthropy

Enoch T. Cobb (December 26, 1797 – February 26, 1876) was an American farmer, businessman, and philanthropist from Barnstable, Massachusetts. He is known locally for bequeathing in his will land that would help to benefit public school students of the town.

== Biography ==
An attendant of the public school system, he married a local woman and had 4 children. Three of the children died in infancy, while the fourth became a Harvard University graduate and a surveyor. His son died at age 24 and two wives predeceased him.

Cobb was a local businessman and farmer, and he co-ran the local general store. He also owned eight woodlots in town which he would later leave to the town upon his death.

== Trust fund ==
=== Early years ===
In his will, Cobb left 100 plus acres of woodlots to the town. He specified in his will that a trustee would be appointed to run the fund. The will called for the raising of funds for the trust to be accomplished by cutting the wood on the land and selling it at public auction. Once the money accumulated to $10,000, the income would be used to buy school books. A trustee for the fund would then be appointed at a town meeting. After the town accepted the terms of the will, they would have to abide by it. The next town meeting after the creation of the trust, voters approved the trust and they also appointed Isaac Davis as the first trustee. After he died, the fund fell into the hands of his son, until he too died in 1932.

=== Disuse ===
Sometime after 1932, the state of Massachusetts passed a law that mandated that schools provide textbooks for their children. The fund also fell out of use after the 1932 death of its trustee because the town did not appoint someone to take their place. As a result, land was rented out for fees ranging between a dollar to one hundred dollars a year. In addition, part of the land on the nearby Barnstable Municipal Airport was used to build a runway. In 1981, plans were brought about which would include the expansion of Runway 15/33, something which abutted the trust fund's land. This brought up the issue of what should be done with the fund, as it became relevant in town politics again. During this time, it was also revealed that the local Veterans of Foreign Wars headquarters was also located on trust land.

=== Revival ===
Town attorneys then revealed plans to put the trust back on track. Local attorney David Cole was suggested to the selectman by another local attorney. Cole started showing interest in the fund in the mid-1970s, and he was one of the few people to actively support change of the fund's purpose. A lawsuit was then brought against the town over the fund. The office of state Attorney General Francis X. Bellotti also became involved as the fund had been seriously misused over the years. The suit was brought in the local probate court. The result of the lawsuit was for a new plan to be developed on how to run the fund. The presiding judge also undid the leases, invalidating them because they were signed by selectman not the trustee. A new plan of operation for trust was adopted after Cole and the assistant attorney general created the plan. The Cy-près doctrine was used to redevelop the trust fund as the original plans of the will would be hard to follow since selling cords of wood was not as profitable as it once was.

As the trustee of the fund, Cole increased the funds from the $10,233 that had existed since 1932 to the over four million dollars that it is at today. The land that was planned for the expansion was then sold to the airport to help to raise further cash for the fund.

=== Trust today ===
Today, there are around 27 acres (110,000 m^{2}) of land remaining in the fund out of the original 100 acres (0.40 km^{2}) plus. Around 2005, there were plans to build affordable housing on 14.32 acres (58,000 m^{2}) of the remaining land. There are over four million dollars left in the fund, and the income of the trust is used for grants. The monies from the fund are not to be used for regular budgetary things, otherwise the use of the fund would be defeated. In 2003, the trust offered over $125,000 in grants to the children of the school district alone.
