= Charles Alexandre =

French hellenist and philologist (1797–1870)

Charles Alexandre (17 February 1797, Amiens – 6 June 1870, Paris) was a 19th-century French hellenist, philologist, general inspector of the Instruction publique and a member of the Institut de France.

He was a student at the École normale supérieure in 1814.

== Works ==
He is the author of many books, in particular an ancient greek-French dictionary published in 1858 as well as a coauthor of a French - ancient greek one published in 1861 and editor of an edition of the greek text, with a Latin translation of the Sibylline Oracles.

== Honours ==
- Commandeur de la Légion d'honneur.
