= Johann Jakob Stähelin =

Swiss theologian (1797–1875)

Johann Jakob Stähelin (1 May 1797, in Basel – 27 August 1875, in Langenbruck) was a Swiss theologian, who specialized in Old Testament studies.

From 1817 to 1821 he studied theology at the University of Tübingen. In 1823 he received his PhD and subsequently worked as a lecturer at the University of Basel. In 1829 he became an associate professor at Basel, where in 1835 he was named a full professor of Old Testament studies. In 1842 he obtained his doctorate of divinity, and in 1846 was appointed university rector.

== Principal works ==
- Kritische Untersuchungen über die Genesis, 1830 – Critical investigations on the biblical Genesis.
- Kritische Untersuchungen über die biblische Chronik, 1830 – Critical investigations on the biblical Chronicles.
- Kritische Untersuchungen über den Pentateuch, die Bucher Josua, Richter, Samuels und der Könige, 1843 – Critical investigations on the Pentateuch, the Books of Joshua, Judges, Samuel and Kings.
- Die messianischen Weissagungen des Alten Testaments in ihrer Entstehung, Entwicklung und Ausbildung : mit Berücksichtigung der hauptsächlichsten neutestamentlichen Citate, 1847 – The messianic prophecies of the Old Testament.
- Specielle Einleitung in die kanonischen Bücher des Alten Testaments, 1862 – Introduction to the canonical books of the Old Testament.
