= Robert Radcliffe (cricketer) =

English cricketer

Personal information
- Full name: Robert Beehoe Radcliffe
- Born: 14 August 1797; Westminster, Middlesex
- Died: 26 August 1832 (aged 35); Leamington, Warwickshire

Domestic team information
- Years: Team
- 1819: Cambridge University
- Source: CricketArchive, 31 March 2013

Robert Beehoe Radcliffe (14 August 1797 – 26 August 1832) was an English cricketer who played for Cambridge University in the 1810s. He is recorded in one match from 1819, in which he scored 6 runs, with a highest score of 6, and took 2 wickets.

Radcliffe was educated at Eton College and King's College, Cambridge. After graduating, he became a Church of England priest and was the vicar of Ashby-de-la-Zouch, Leicestershire, from 1828 until his death.

== Bibliography ==
- Haygarth, Arthur (1862). Scores & Biographies, Volume 1 (1744–1826). Lillywhite.
