= Lick Creek =

Lick Creek may refer to:

== Streams ==
=== Illinois ===
- Lick Creek (Sangamon River), in Illinois

=== Missouri ===
- Lick Creek (Fishing River), in Missouri
- Lick Creek (Meramec River), in Missouri
- Lick Creek (North Fork Cuivre River), in Missouri
- Lick Creek (North Fork River), in Missouri
- Lick Creek (Osage River), in Missouri
- Lick Creek (Smith Creek), in Missouri
- Lick Creek (St. Francis River), in Missouri

=== North Carolina ===
- Lick Creek (Brown Creek tributary), a stream in Anson County, North Carolina
- Lick Creek (Cape Fear River tributary), a stream in Lee County, North Carolina
- Lick Creek (Deep River tributary), a stream in Moore County, North Carolina

=== Pennsylvania ===
- Lick Creek (Shamokin Creek), in Pennsylvania

=== Tennessee ===
- Lick Creek (Duck River), in Tennessee
- Lick Creek (Henderson County, Tennessee), in Tennessee

== Populated places ==
- Lick Creek, Kentucky
- Lick Creek, West Virginia
- Lick Creek Township, Davis County, Iowa

== Formerly populated places ==
- Lick Creek, Indiana
