= Williams Creek =

Williams Creek may refer to:

United States

- Williams Creek, Indiana, a town
- Williams Creek (Cole Camp Creek), a stream in Missouri
- Williams Creek (Fishing River), a stream in Missouri
- Williams Creek (Spring River), a stream in Missouri
- Williams Creek, South Dakota, a township
- Williams Creek (Texas), a river in Texas
- Williams Creek (Florida), a stream in Florida

Canada

- Williams Creek (British Columbia), a historically important gold-bearing creek in British Columbia, Canada
