= Carroll Creek =

Carroll Creek may refer to:

- Carroll Creek (Maryland), a tributary of the Monocacy River
- Carroll Creek (Clear Creek), a stream in Missouri
- Carroll Creek (South Dakota), a stream
