= Ruffner =

List of notable individuals with surname Ruffner

Ruffner is a surname. Notable people with the surname include:

- Clark L. Ruffner (1903–1982), U.S. Army general
- Frederick Gale Ruffner Jr. (1926–2014), American publisher
- Ginny Ruffner (1952–2025), American glass artist
- Henry Ruffner (1790–1861), American educator and Presbyterian minister
- Lewis Ruffner (1797–1883), American merchant, magistrate, slaveowner, and politician
- Mason Ruffner (born 1947), American blues and rock singer, guitarist, and songwriter
- Pattie Ruffner Jacobs (1875–1935), American suffragist
- Paul Ruffner (1948–2022), American basketball player
- Viola Ruffner (1812–1903), American schoolteacher
