= Fishing River Township, Clay County, Missouri =

Township in Clay County, Missouri, U.S.

Chouteau Township
- Township
- Interactive map of Chouteau Township
- Coordinates: 39°12′47″N 94°30′06″W
- Country: United States
- State: Missouri
- County: Clay

Area
  - Total: 52.85 sq mi (136.9 km^{2})
  - Land: 51.94 sq mi (134.5 km^{2})
  - Water: 0.91 sq mi (2.4 km^{2}) 1.72%
- Elevation: 856 ft (261 m)

Population (2020)
  - Total: 61,255
  - Density: 1,179/sq mi (455/km^{2})
- FIPS code: 29-04713780
- GNIS feature ID: 766504

Chouteau Township is a township in Clay County, Missouri, United States. At the 2020 census, its population was 61,255.

Fishing River Township was established in 1821, taking its name from the Fishing River.
