= Germanic mythology =

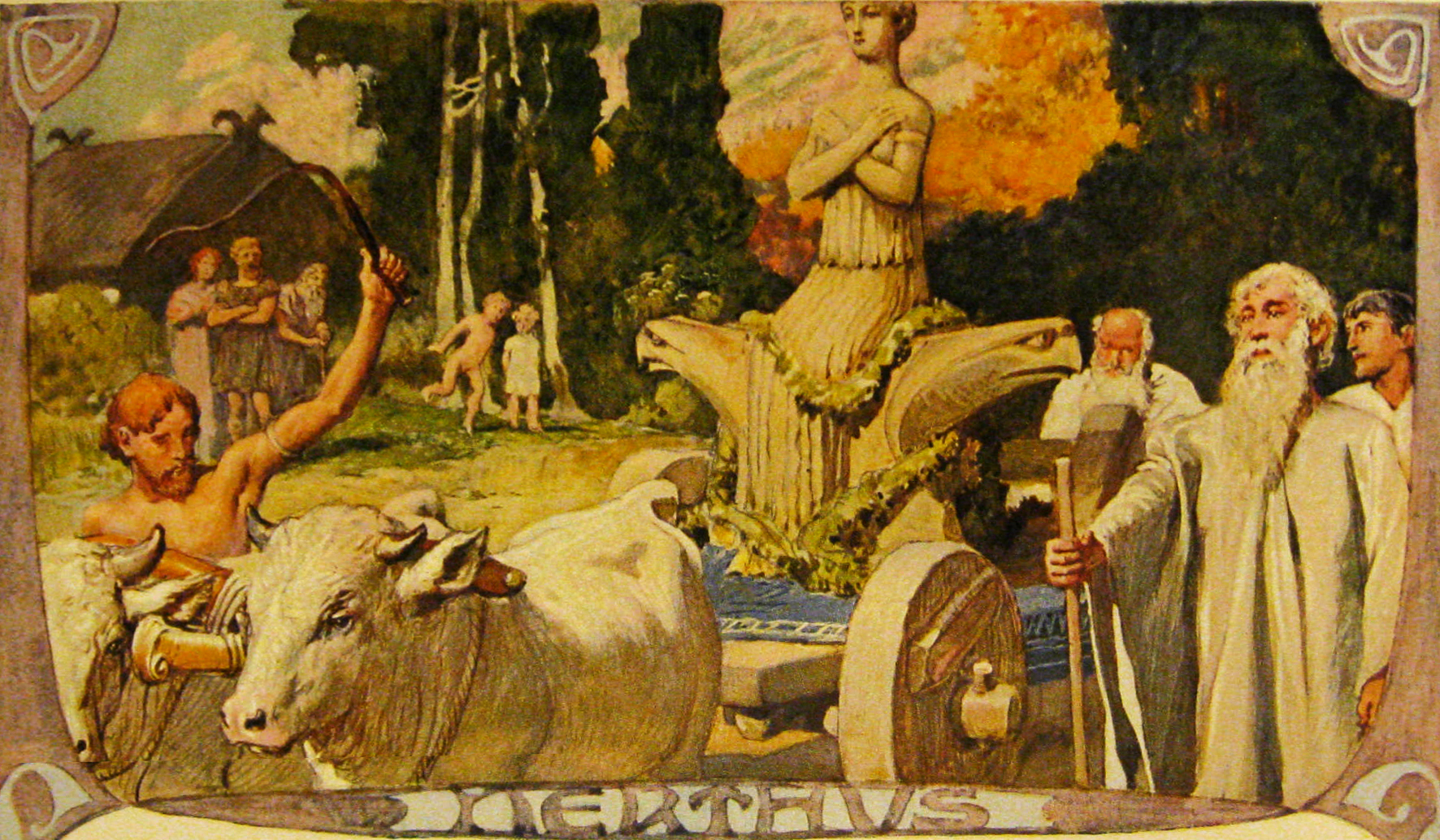
Nerthus (1905) by Emil Doepler depicts Nerthus, an early Germanic goddess whose name developed into Njörðr among the North Germanic peoples

Germanic mythology consists of the body of myths native to the Germanic peoples, including Norse mythology, Anglo-Saxon mythology, and Continental Germanic mythology. It was a key element of Germanic paganism.

== Origins ==
As the Germanic languages developed from Proto-Indo-European language, Germanic mythology is ultimately a development of Proto-Indo-European mythology. Archaeological remains, such as petroglyphs in Scandinavia, suggest continuity in Germanic mythology since at least the Nordic Bronze Age.

== Sources ==
The earliest written sources on Germanic mythology include literature by Roman writers. This includes Commentaries on the Gallic War by Julius Caesar, Geographica by Strabo, and Germania by Tacitus. Later Latin-language sources on Germanic mythology include Getica by Jordanes, History of the Lombards by Paul the Deacon, Ecclesiastical History of the English People by Bede, Vita Ansgari by Rimbert, Gesta Hammaburgensis ecclesiae pontificum by Adam of Bremen, and Gesta Danorum by Saxo Grammaticus.

Vernacular sources on Germanic mythology include the Merseburg Charms, the Nibelungenlied, and various pieces of Old English literature, particularly Beowulf. The most important sources on Germanic mythology, however, are works of Old Norse literature, most of which were written down in the Icelandic Commonwealth during the Middle Ages; of particular importance is the Poetic Edda.

Archaeological evidence, Runic inscriptions and place-names are also useful sources on Germanic mythology.

== Mythology ==
The myths of the Germanic peoples feature narratives focused on Germanic deities and a variety of other entities.

=== Cosmology ===
The beginning and end of the world is told in Völuspá, the first and best known poem in the Poetic Edda. The seeress in Völuspá tells of how the world began with a great magical nothingness called Ginnungagap, until Odin and his two brothers raised the Earth from the sea. They came across the tree trunks Ask and Embla, whom they created into the first human couple.

The accounts of Völuspá are contrasted with those in Vafþrúðnismál and Grímnismál. These say that Odin created the world from the body of the giant Ymir. Odin and his brothers were in turn descended from Búri, who had been created by the primeval cow Auðumbla. Parallels to Auðumbla are found in Indo-Iranian religion, testifying to the ancient Indo-European origins of Germanic mythology.

A central point in the Germanic cosmos is the tree Yggdrasil. Germanic mythology prophesises the end of the world in a coming Ragnarök.

=== Deities ===
A number of Germanic gods are mentioned in Old Norse literature and they are divided into the Æsir and the Vanir. The Æsir are primarily gods of war and dominate the latter, who are gods of fertility and wealth.

The chief god of the Æsir is Odin, a god associated with war, seiðr (witchcraft), and wisdom. He was probably worshipped primarily by kings and noblemen rather than the common people. Odin is the lord of Asgard, the abode of the gods, which includes the majestic hall Valhalla, where warriors who died a heroic death in battle (Einherjar) were admitted in order to prepare them to help Odin in the coming Ragnarök.

Odin's wife was Frigg. His popular son, by the jǫtunn Jǫrð, was Thor, the god associated with thunder. Wielding his hammer Mjölnir, Thor engaged in conflict with the jötnar (giants) and the serpent Jörmungandr. Thor has many parallels in Indo-European mythology. He appears to have been worshiped extensively by the Germanic peoples, particularly warriors and the common people. A notable brother of Thor is Baldr. Other significant Æsir include the trickster god Loki; Heimdallr, who is reported in Rígsþula to have fathered the three classes of men; and Týr, a god associated with war and who lost his hand to the wolf Fenrir, who some scholars have proposed on linguistic evidence may have been a central deity in the Germanic pantheon in earlier times.

In Old Norse literature, the Æsir and Vanir are described as being in conflict. Through this conflict, certain Vanir gods, such as Njörðr, Freyja, and Freyr, join the Æsir. Similarities have been pointed out between Njörðr and Nerthus, a Germanic fertility god mentioned by Tacitus in Germania in the 1st-century AD. Sources also mention numerous other entities, such as Hel, who oversees an underworld location of the same name.

=== Legendary creatures ===
A number of legendary creatures appear in Germanic mythology, such as dísir, fylgjur, draugar, dwarfs, elves, as well as jötnar, goblins, giants, trolls and dragons.

== Legacy ==
During the Middle Ages, Germanic peoples were converted to Christianity. The study of Germanic mythology has remained an important element of Germanic philology since the development of the field and the topic is an integral component of Heathenry, the modern revival of Germanic paganism. Elements of Germanic mythology have survived into modern Germanic folklore.

== See also ==
- List of Germanic deities
- Common Germanic deities
- Germanic Paganism
- Baltic mythology
- Celtic mythology
- Slavic mythology
- Norse mythology
- Anglo Saxon mythology
