= Kanawha saltworks =

Mineral resource, W. Virginia

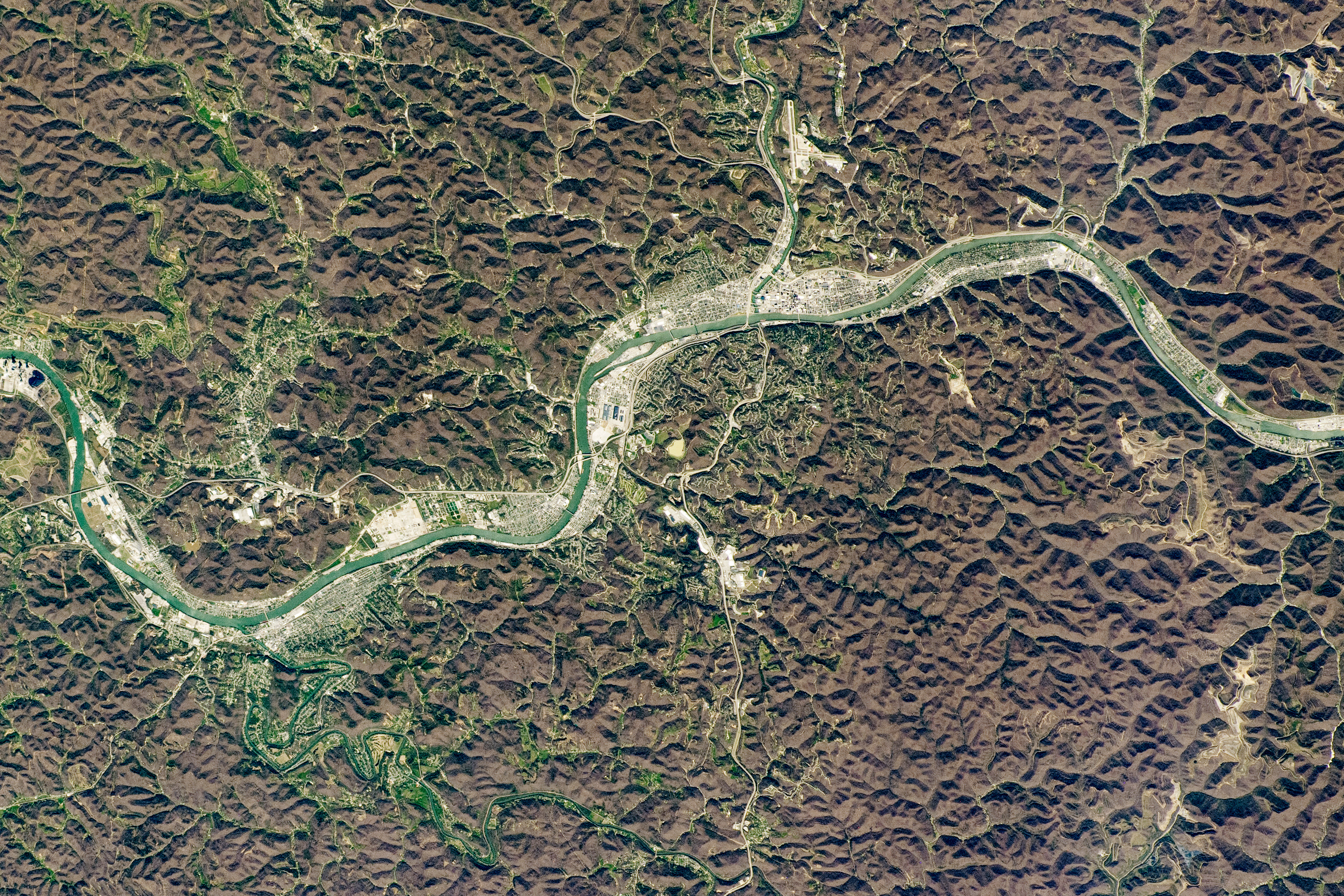
Astronaut photo of the Kanawha River near Charleston, taken from the International Space Station on Expedition 62 in 2020

The Kanawha saltworks were an important 19th-century mineral resource of the United States. Originally known as Buffalo Salt Lick, in the early 19th century salt producers began creating brine wells, in the vicinity of the Great Kanawha River in what is now West Virginia, and building kettles and furnaces for boiling the brine down into salable crystal salt. The Kanawha is a tributary of the Ohio River and the watershed lies within what are now Fayette, Kanawha, Putnam, and Mason counties. The salt works, also known as the Kanawha Salines, ran for 10 mi (16 km) along the river.

== History ==
A captive White woman named Mary Ingles observed Indigenous people harvesting salt in the area in the 1750s.

George Washington owned land in the area in the 18th century, near Burning Spring Branch, and was involved in surveying the general area in the 1770s. Brine was first pumped to the surface in 1785 near Malden. The first salt furnace in the Kanawha valley was built in 1797 near Charleston. Salt sold for three to ten cents a pound in the first decade of the 19th century. Wells drilled in the geologically rich area also surfaced oil and gas, which then leaked into the river, which became known as the Big Greasy River. The furnaces were initially fueled by locally harvested wood, then by coal, and eventually some were fired with natural gas. Finished salt was shipped out by river, at first on canoes and flatboats, then, beginning in the 1820s, by steamboat.

One of the major political issues that drew the attention of Thomas Hart Benton, the Jacksonian Democrat U.S. Senator from Missouri, was attacking the attempted cartelization of the saltworks, which effort he apparently considered to be as critical to his political legacy as the resolution expunging the censure of Andrew Jackson. At its peak, prior to the American Civil War, the valley had at least 50 salt furnaces and was the main salt supply for the U.S.

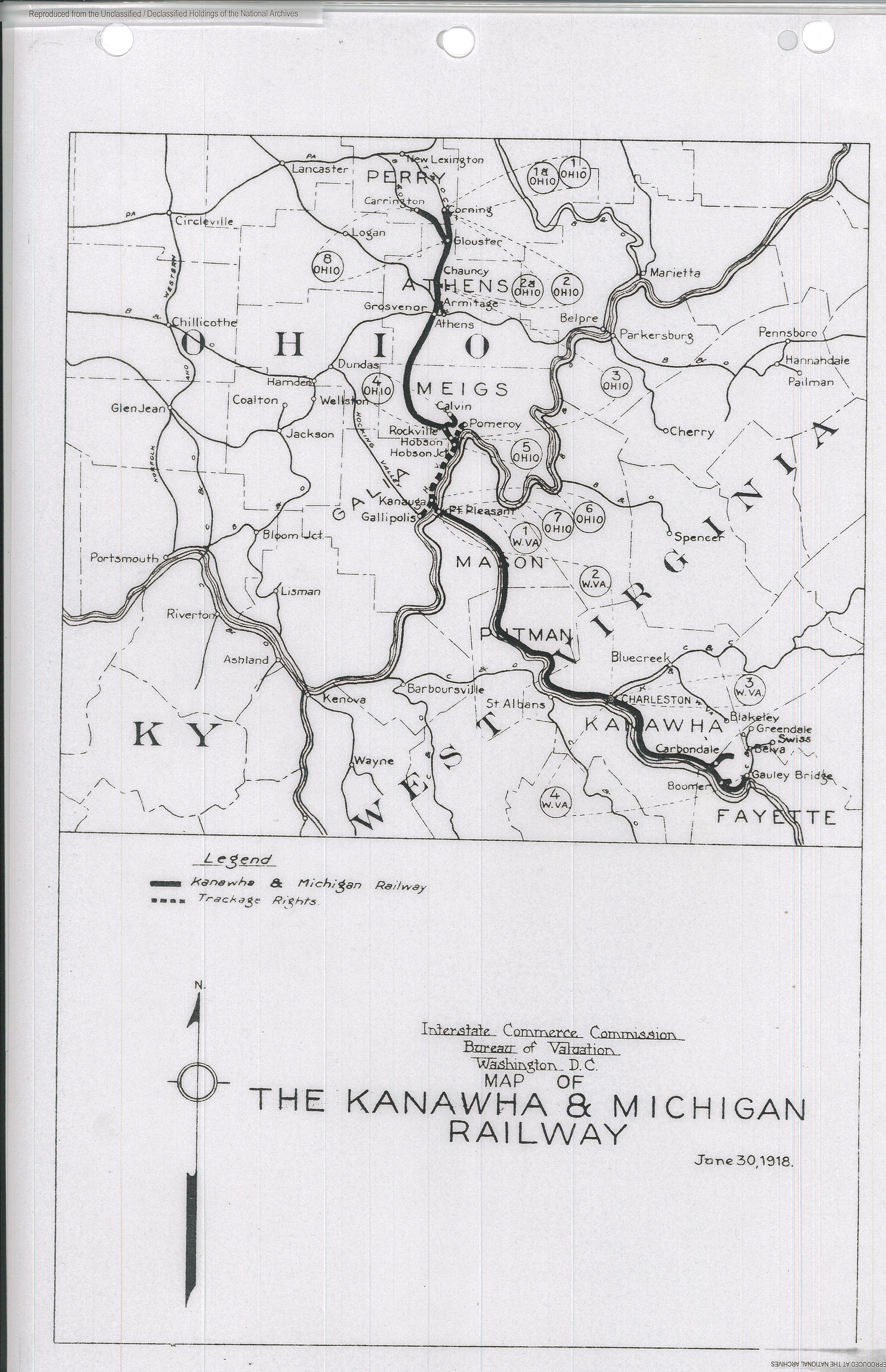
Kanawha & Michigan Railway route map c. 1918

Industrialization and western expansion eventually made Kanawha's salt resources superfluous to needs, and "the low price of salt and the discovery of richer brines in more northern districts have forced the companies, one after another, to discontinue operations. The one plant which is still in successful in operation is located at Malden, six miles above Charleston on the Kanawha & Michigan railroad and on the north bank of the Kanawha river. It is located on the old Ruffner property and was built in the spring of 1865. It is owned and operated by Mr. Dickinson under the name of the J. Q. Dickinson Salt Company."

== Geology ==
According to a 1914 report by the West Virginia Geological Survey, "The salt water at Malden is obtained from the lower sand, ranging in thickness about 200 ft (61 m), and from 700–900 ft (210–270 m) below the surface of the river bottom."

== See also ==
- Malden Historic District
- Salt Sulphur Springs Historic District
- Salt Lick Reservation controversy – Chickasaw treaty grant in Tennessee

== Sources ==
- Davis, Leslie Martz (October 1946). "Economic Development of the Great Kanawha Valley". Economic Geography. 22 (4): 255–267. doi:10.2307/141236. JSTOR 141236.
- Krebs, Charles E.; Teets, D. D. Jr. (1914). "The Salt Industry". Kanawha County. County Reports and Maps. Printed by Wheeling News Litho. Co. Wheeling, West Virginia: West Virginia Geological and Economic Survey. pp. 595–601. OCLC 2413046 – via HathiTrust.
- Stealey, John E. III (2016) [1993]. The Antebellum Kanawha Salt Business and Western Markets. West Virginia and Appalachia. Original publisher: University Press of Kentucky (New ed.). Morgantown, West Virginia: West Virginia University Press. ISBN 978-1-943665-31-0. LCCN 2016039852. OCLC 957345217. Project MUSE book 47682.
