= Holmes Creek =

Stream in the U.S. state of Missouri

Holmes Creek is a stream in Clay County in the U.S. state of Missouri. It is a tributary to the Fishing River.

The stream headwaters arise at 39°17′23″N 94°23′14″W just south of U.S. Route 69. The stream flows northeast passing under Route 69 and past the community of Chandler. It turns to the east again passing under Route 69 before reaching its confluence with the Fishing River just southwest of Mosby at 39°18′49″N 94°17′49″W. The elevation of the headwaters is 950 feet (290 m) and the confluence is at 741 feet (226 m).

Holmes Creek has the name of the local Holmes family.

== See also ==
- Tributaries of the Fishing River
- List of rivers of Missouri
