= Space selfie =

Self-portrait photo taken in outer space

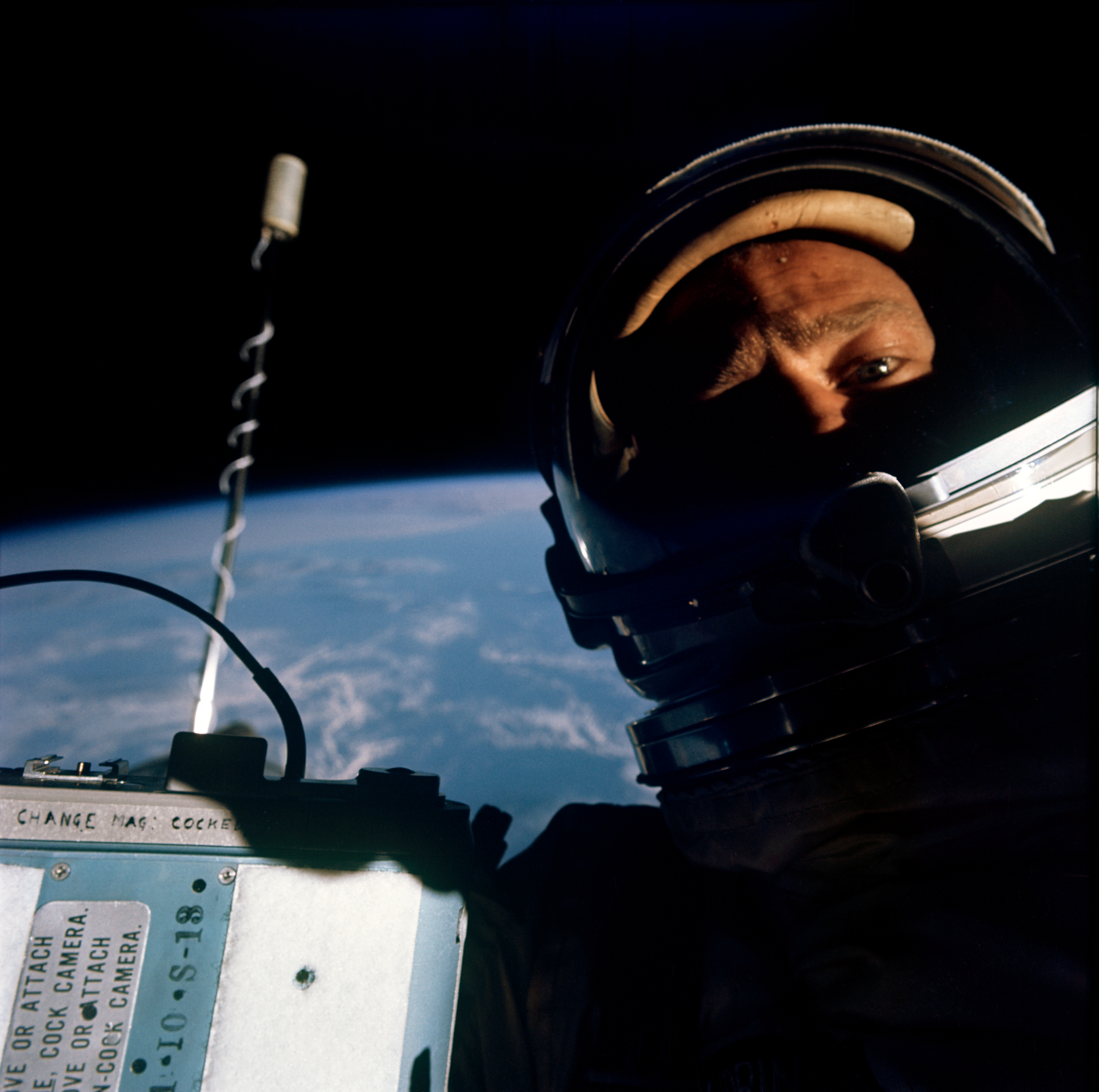
Buzz Aldrin took the first EVA "selfie" in 1966 during the Gemini 12 mission.

A space selfie is a selfie (self-portrait photograph typically posted on social media sites) that is taken in outer space. This include selfies taken by astronauts (also known as astronaut selfies), machines (also known as space robot selfies and rover selfies) and by indirect methods.

== Astronauts ==
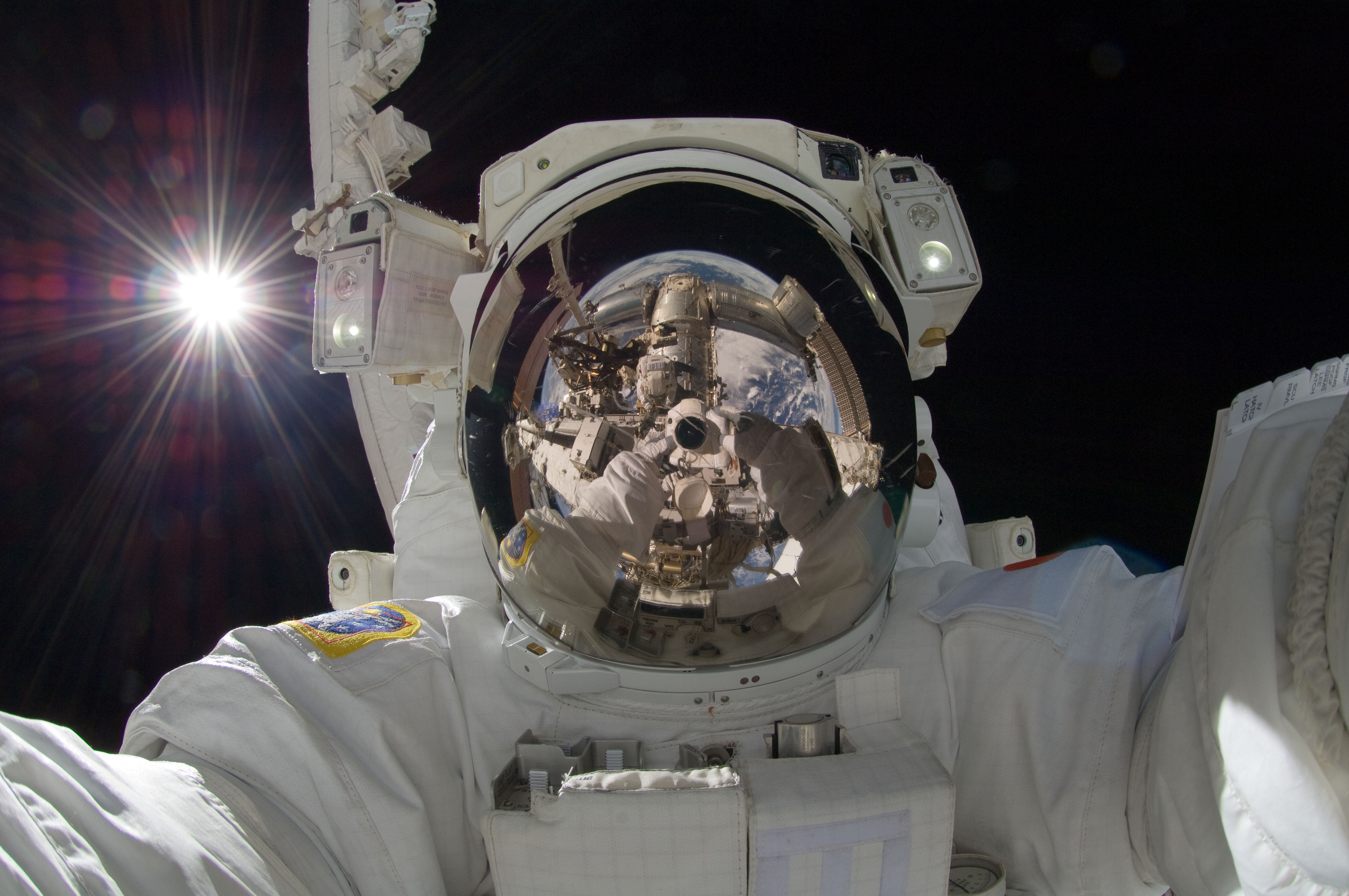
Japan Aerospace Exploration Agency astronaut Akihiko Hoshide took a space selfie in September 2012.

The first known space selfie (during an EVA - an earlier shot inside the capsule was taken on Gemini 10 by Michael Collins) was taken by Buzz Aldrin during the Gemini 12 mission.

The extra-vehicular activity (EVA) equipment used by astronauts during spacewalks contains a specially designed camera for photography in outer space. The main purpose of the EVA camera is to take pictures of the subjects related to the missions.

There have been many space selfies, some of which use the visor of another astronaut's helmet as the mirror. Early space selfies after the word "selfie" was first used in 2002 without assistance from another astronaut included Donald Pettit and Stephen Robinson. Pettit took one during the Expedition 6 in January 2003. Robinson took his during the repair of the Space Shuttle Discovery on August 3, 2005, as part of the STS-114 mission.

Another notable space selfie was taken by Japanese astronaut Akihiko Hoshide during the six-hour, 28-minute spacewalk on September 5, 2012. Hoshide's photo became a viral phenomenon after Commander Chris Hadfield uploaded the photo to his Twitter account on September 30, 2013. Coincidentally, Oxford University Press, the publisher of the Oxford English Dictionary, announced in November 2013 that "selfie" was the word of the year for 2013. The picture topped many selfie lists of the year. Another space selfie of Hoshide also showed up on Instagram and appeared on a list of top selfies of 2013.

== Machines ==
Space selfies can be dated back to 1976 when the lander of the Viking 2 mission took the photo of its deck after landing on Mars; however they were not considered by Discovery News as true selfies in its list of top 10 space robot selfies.

In 1989, the Galileo spacecraft took a selfie using its near-infrared mapping spectrometer (NIMS). The image was taken in order to judge how parts of the spacecraft would block the instrument's view. The resulting image was fuzzy and warped by Galileo's spin.

An unusual approach was taken in 2010 by IKAROS, launched by Japan Aerospace Exploration Agency (JAXA). It included two wireless cameras that were ejected out of the spacecraft for the sole purpose of taking "hand free" space selfies. A blog entry about the photos was posted in 2010 and the link was posted on Twitter in 2013.

=== Orbital Express ===
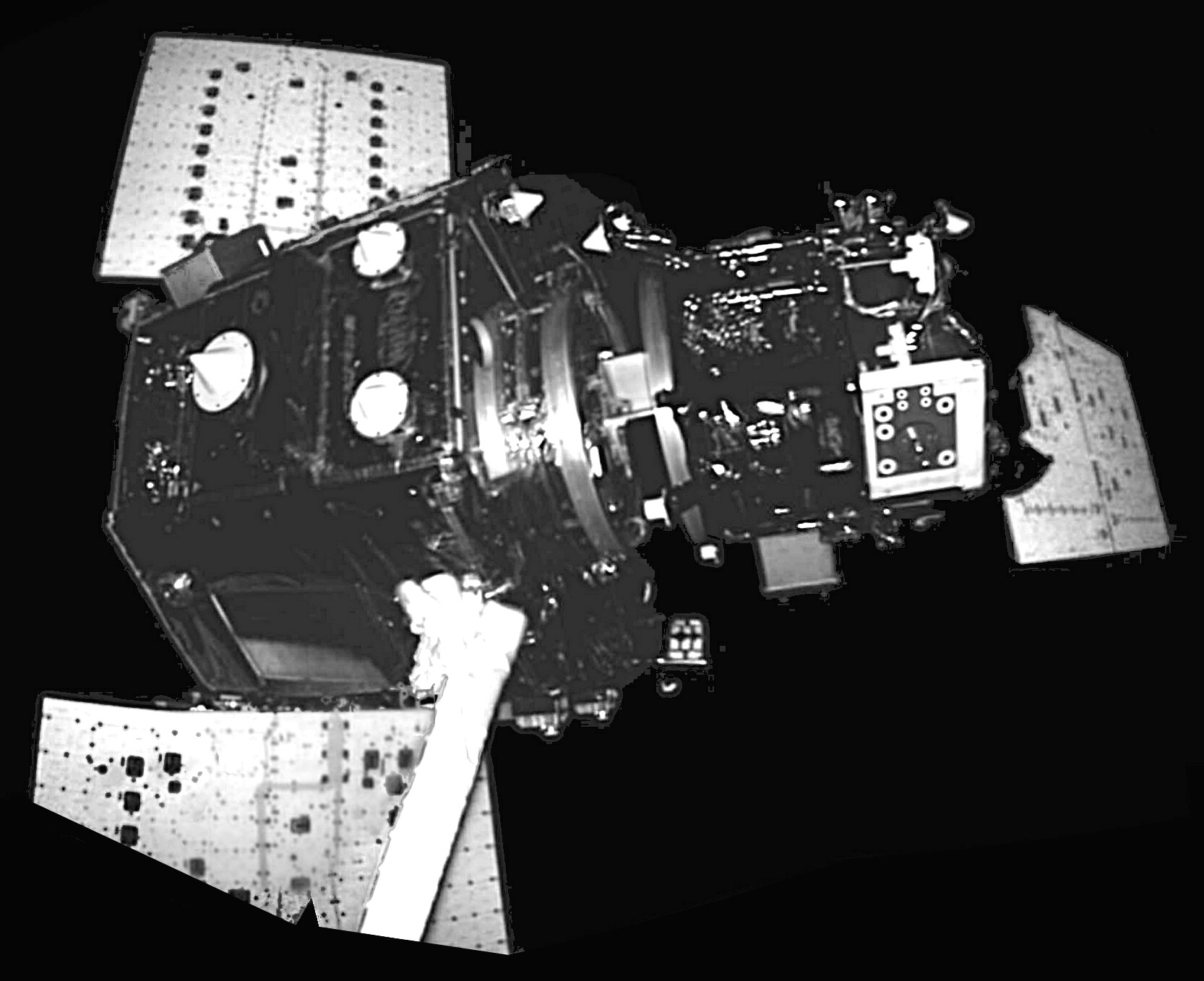
Autonomous robot space selfie of Orbital Express spacecraft

On June 22, 2007, DARPA's Orbital Express spacecraft captured perhaps the first space selfie by an autonomous robot. Taken near the end of mission on July 22, 2007, the selfie was intended to capture a family portrait of the two spacecraft in a mated configuration. The selfie shows the ASTRO "servicing satellite" at left, and the NEXTSat "client satellite" at right. The robot arm used to capture the selfie can be seen in white at the bottom of the frame. The photo has a dark, high-contrast quality to it due to the use of the arm-mounted camera, not intended for general photography, but used to autonomously track and acquire the NEXTSat.

=== Curiosity rover ===
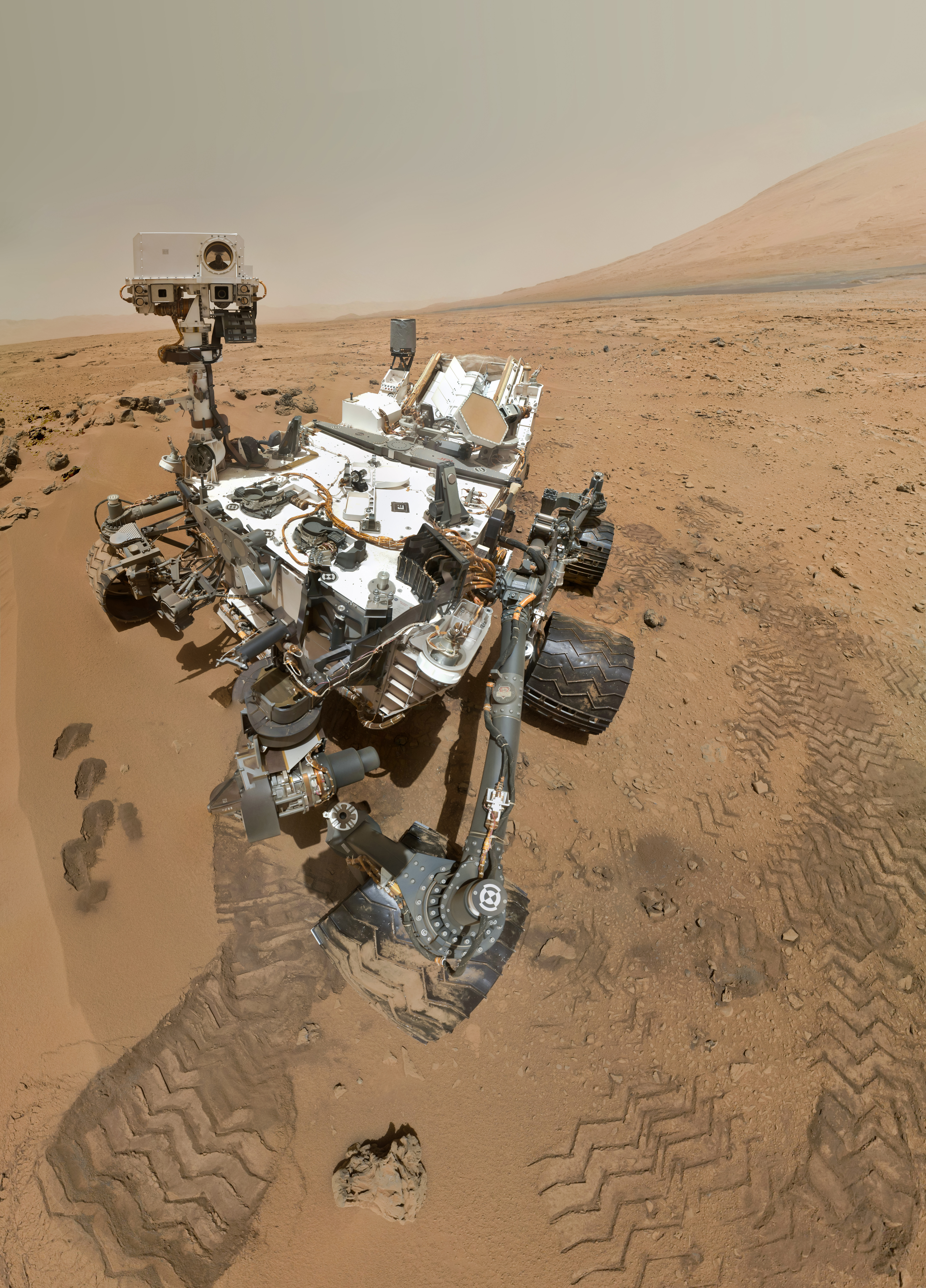
Space selfie of Curiosity rover (2012)

Curiosity, which landed on Mars in 2012, was equipped with the Mars Hand Lens Imager (MAHLI) camera. It can maneuver its robotic arm and turn the attached camera around to take its head shots. Discovery News described the maneuver as the way to take a truly authentic selfie and gave it the title King of Selfies in 2013.

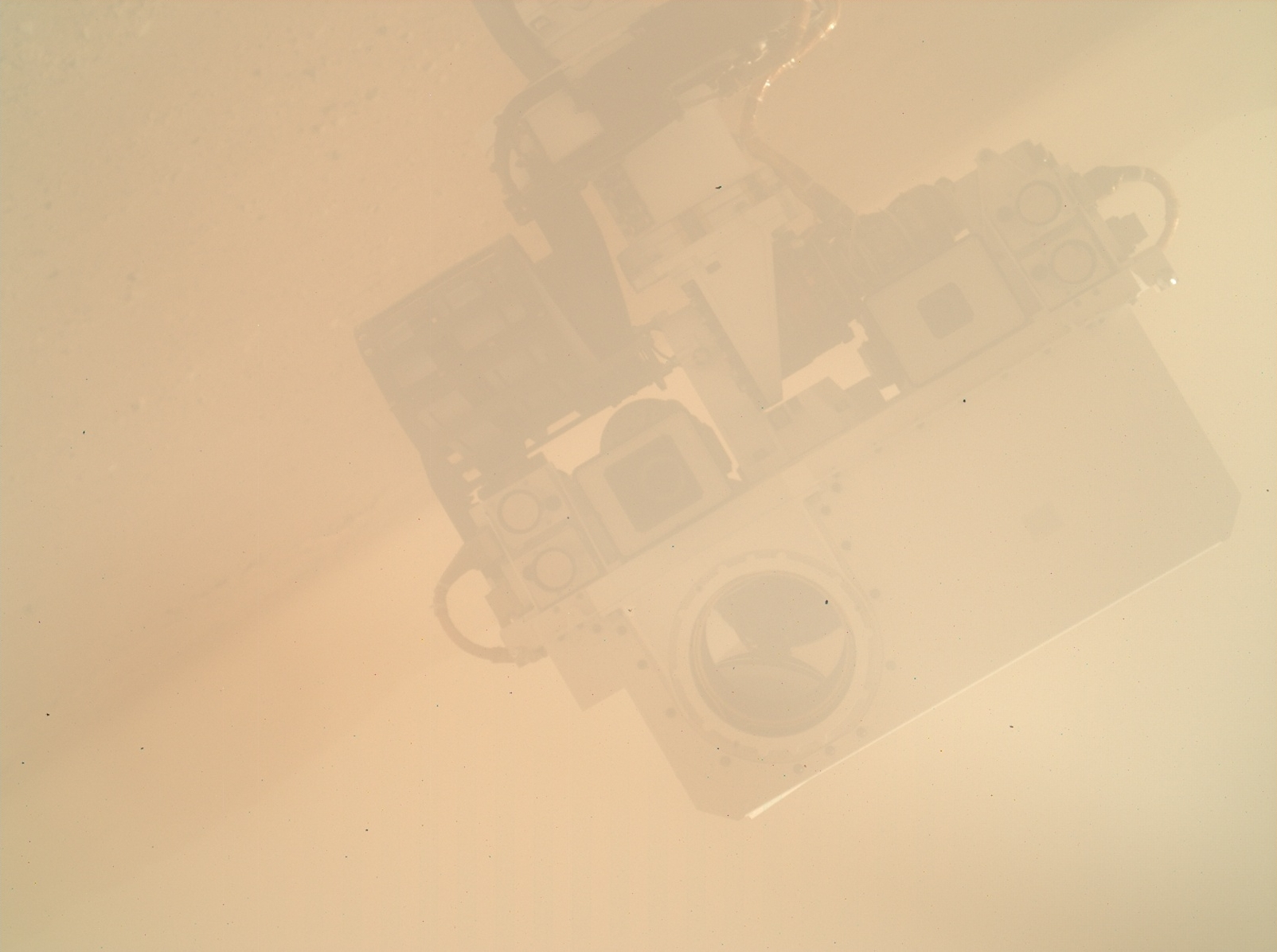
The raw image of the first space selfie taken by the Curiosity rover

The first space selfie on another planet was taken by the Curiosity rover on September 7, 2012, based on the local time at Jet Propulsion Laboratory, the base of the operations in Pasadena, California. It was taken while the clear dust cover of the lens was closed giving a blurry image. The image was slightly modified and posted on its Facebook account on September 8, 2012, with the message:

Hello, Gorgeous! Snapped this self portrait while inspecting my MAHLI camera with its dust cover intentionally left on. This was a test to make sure the cover, its hinge the area it sweeps when it opens are clear of debris.

— NASA's Curiosity Mars Rover, https://www.facebook.com/MarsCuriosity

On November 19, 2013, one day after Oxford announced that "selfie" was the word of the year, the @MarsCuriosity Twitter account posted a space selfie with the message:

Oh, @OxfordWords... Need an illustration for #WOTYselfie? For your consideration. pic.twitter.com/EKNafzYsyp

— @MarsCuriosity, https://www.twitter.com/MarsCuriosity

=== Opportunity rover ===
In February 2018, the Opportunity rover used its MER Microscopic Imager to take a selfie to mark 5,000 sols on Mars. The MER Microscopic Imager has a fixed focus and a fairly narrow field of view resulting in the selfie having to be made up of a series of stitched, out of focus shots. In order to reduce the amount of data that needed to be transmitted the images were scaled down in size and compressed before being transmitted from the rover. This was the first time images from the MER Microscopic Imager had been scaled down by the rover.

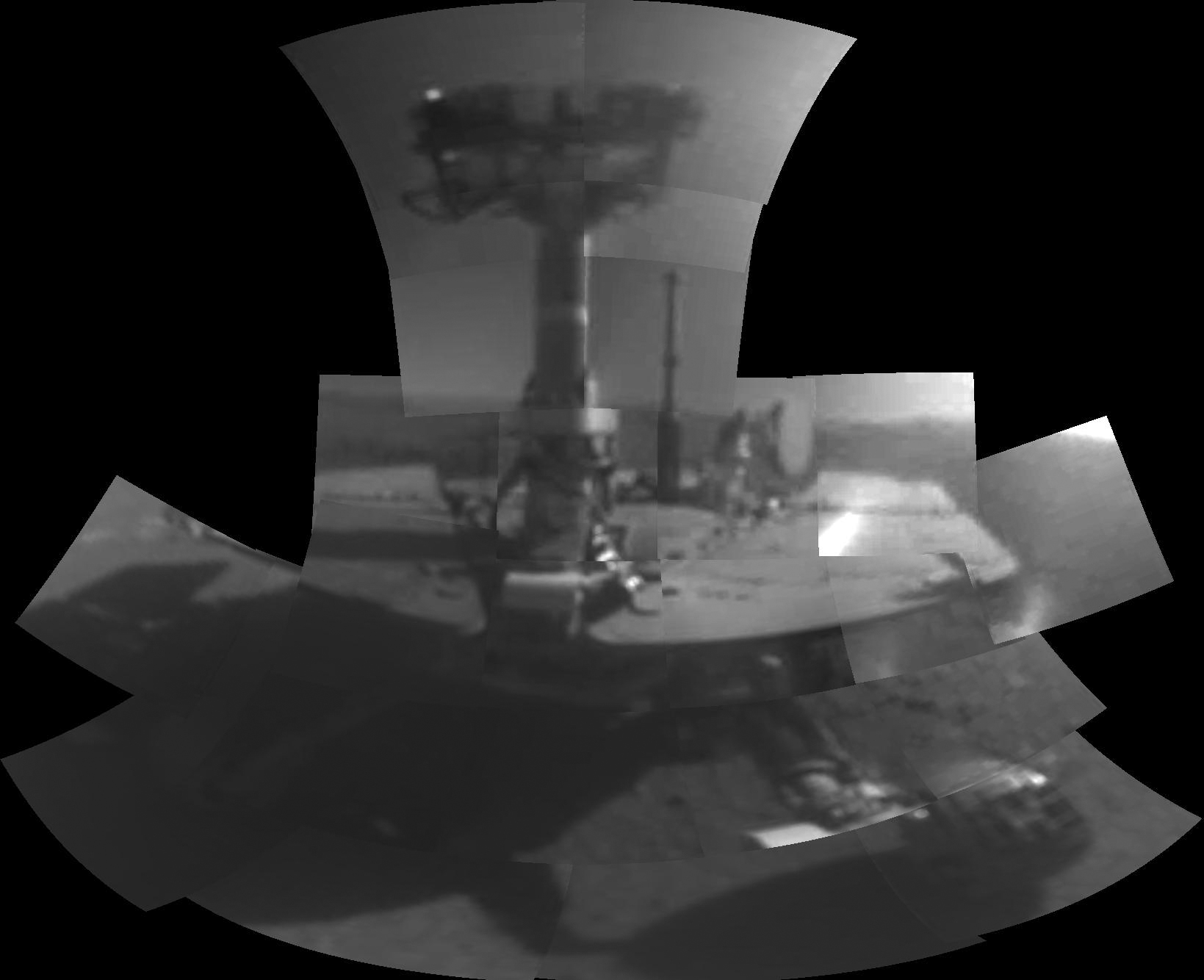
Space selfie of Opportunity rover

=== Perseverance rover ===
Since it landed on Mars on 2020, Perseverance has been taking a multitude of space selfies using its Wide Angle Topographic Sensor for Operations and eNgineering (WATSON) camera. The selfies are initially stitched together from a total of 62 images taken by WATSON, with selfies taking up to an hour to take due to the slow movement of its robotic arm. Most notable is its 6 April 2020 selfie with Ingenuity, the first with another probe on Mars. The rover frequently takes these selfies in order to allow engineers to inspect routine damage on the rover, as well as to inspire the public with photos of Perseverance.

Perseverance taking a space selfie with Ingenuity

Perseverance taking another space selfie after taking the first core samples of the Mars 2020 mission

== Indirect methods ==
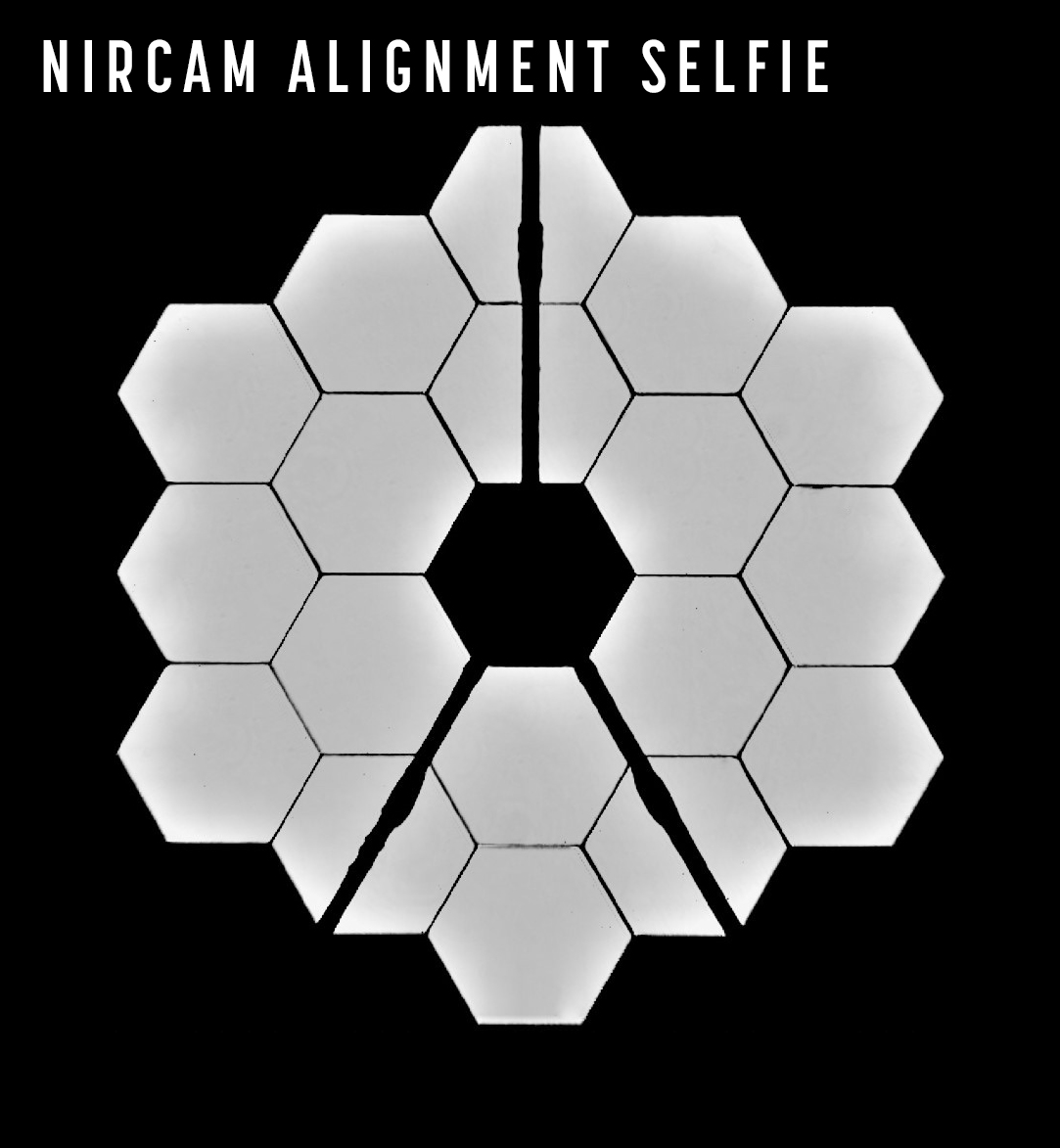
18 primary mirrors of the James Webb Space Telescope reflected in the secondary mirror

During a brief period, an alternative method was presented as available by which a person could, without being in outer space, indirectly take space selfies. This was promoted as part of the crowdfunding efforts for the Planetary Resources's ARKYD mission. The ARKYD "space selfie" method would have allowed donors to upload their own photos to the telescope orbiting the Earth; the telescope would have had a robotic arm equipped with a camera and a small screen to display the picture of the donor on one surface of the telescope, and the on-screen image of the donor was to be visible to the lower part of the camera (with the Earth as the background) allowing a space selfie to be taken.

A similar service was launched in 2014 by Belgian startup SpaceBooth. The SpaceBooth Low Earth Orbit pico-satellite will project uploaded images in front of a transparent window and then take a picture of the projection with space in the background. The space selfie will then be sent back to the Earth.

In November 2019, Spelfie, the selfie from space, was launched to allow users to take a selfie at the exact time that a satellite camera captures their location from space.

Users of the app click on the event they are attending, then, once they are at the venue, the app provides coordinates so the user knows precisely where to position themselves and at what time. They then take a photo of themselves at the moment the satellite is taking its photo and later the same day the app sends back the satellite image juxtaposed with the selfie to be viewed in its gallery.

The tool, which uses Airbus satellites, was demonstrated as part of a BBC documentary showing a village of people spelling out the words Act Now on a beach in Bali, with the image captured on camera from space.

Spelfie is primarily aimed at people attending major sports and cultural events but for its second phase of development, the app will extend beyond specific events and allow users to give a specific location anywhere in the world, and be alerted if the satellite is going to pass overhead.

== See also ==
- The Blue Marble – Photograph of Earth taken by Apollo 17 crew
- The Day the Earth Smiled – 2013 photograph of Saturn and Earth
- Pale Blue Dot – Photograph of Earth by Voyager 1
- Hello, World – 2026 photograph of Earth taken by Reid Wiseman of the Artemis II mission
- Timeline of first images of Earth from space
- Astronaut photo
