= Chandler, Missouri =

Unincorporated community in Missouri, U.S.

Coordinates: 39°18′01″N 94°22′58″W

Chandler is an unincorporated community in Clay County, in northwest Missouri . The community is on the Burlington Northern Railroad Line between the cities of Liberty and Kearney. Holmes Creek flows past the community.

== History ==
A post office called Chandler was established in 1885, and remained in operation until 1947. The community was named after John N. Chandler, an officer in the Civil War.
