= Fort Cooper Creek =

Coordinates: 35°48′39″N 87°17′20″W

Fort Cooper Creek is a stream off of Lick Creek in Hickman County, Tennessee, in the United States. It is a tributary to Lick Creek.

== History ==
Fort Cooper was the name given to the log cabin of the local Cooper family of pioneer settlers.

== See also ==
- List of rivers of Tennessee
