= Shackelford Branch =

River in Ray County, Missouri, United States

Coordinates: 39°15′58″N 94°12′16″W

Shackelford Branch is a stream in Ray County in the U.S. state of Missouri. It is a tributary of the Fishing River.

Shackelford Branch has the last name of Jim and John Shackleford, original owners of the site.

== See also ==
- Tributaries of the Fishing River
- List of rivers of Missouri
