= Lick Creek (North Fork Cuivre River tributary) =

Stream in the American state of Missouri

Coordinates: 39.245599°N 91.251814°W

Lick Creek is a stream in Pike County in the U.S. state of Missouri. It is a tributary of North Fork Cuivre River.

Lick Creek was so named on account of a mineral lick near its course.

== See also ==
- List of rivers of Missouri
