= Lick Creek (Meramec River tributary) =

Stream in the American state of Missouri

Coordinates: 38.041434°N 91.304589°W

Lick Creek is a stream in Crawford County in the U.S. state of Missouri. It is a tributary of the Meramec River.

Lick Creek most likely was named for mineral licks along its course.

== See also ==
- List of rivers of Missouri
