= Auðumbla =

Primeval cow of Norse mythology

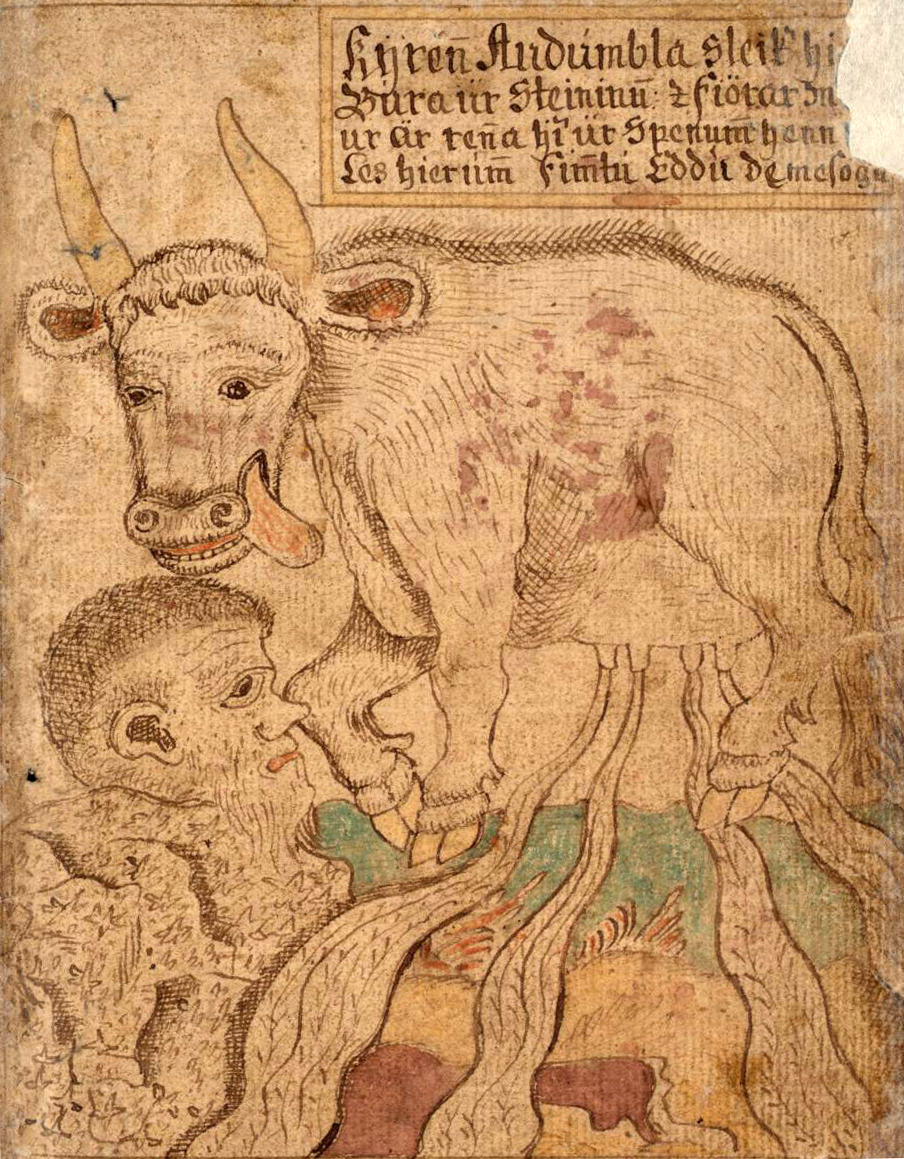
Auðumbla licks Búri free as she produces rivers of milk from her udders, an illustration from an 18th-century Icelandic manuscript of the Prose Edda

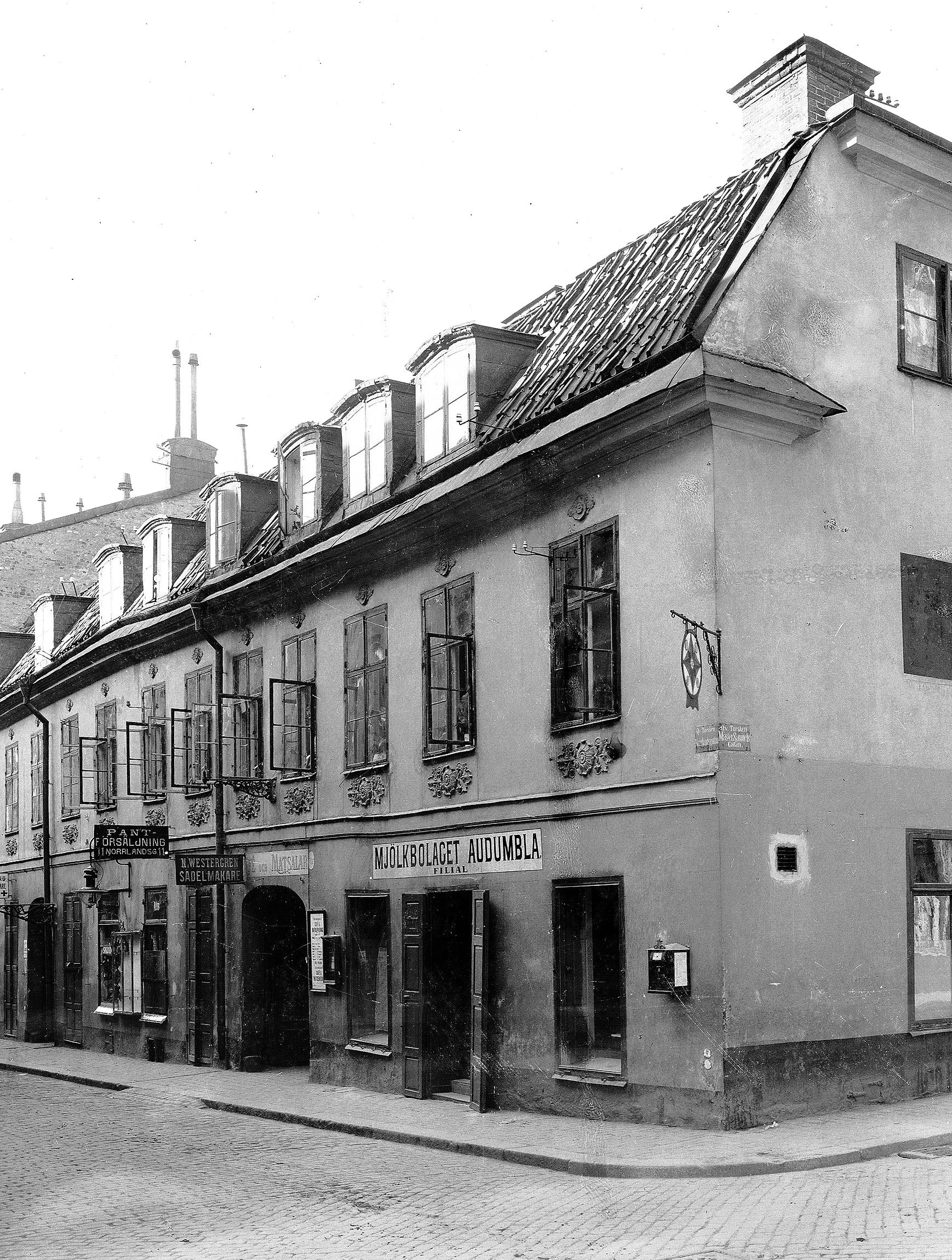
Audumbla milk company in Stockholm 1908. This house was also Alfred Nobel's birthplace.

In Norse mythology, Auðumbla (Old Norse pronunciation: [ˈɔuðˌumblɑ]; also Auðhumla [ˈɔuðˌhumlɑ] and Auðumla [ˈɔuðˌumlɑ]) is a primeval cow. The primordial frost jötunn Ymir fed upon her milk, and over the course of three days she licked away the salty rime rocks and revealed Búri, grandfather of the gods and brothers Odin, Vili and Vé. The creature is attested solely in the Prose Edda, composed in the 13th century by Icelander Snorri Sturluson. Scholars identify her as stemming from a very early stratum of Germanic mythology, and ultimately belonging to larger complex of primordial bovines or cow-associated goddesses.

== Name ==
The cow's name variously appears in Prose Edda manuscripts as Auðumbla [ˈɔuðˌumblɑ], Auðhumla [ˈɔuðˌhumlɑ], and Auðumla [ˈɔuðˌumlɑ], and is generally accepted as meaning 'hornless cow rich in milk' (from Old Norse auðr 'riches' and *humala 'hornless').

The compound presents some level of semantic ambiguity. A parallel occurs in Scottish English humble-cow 'hornless cow', and Northern Europeans have bred hornless cows since prehistoric times. As highlighted above, auð- may mean 'rich' and in turn 'rich hornless cow' remains generally accepted among scholars as a gloss of the Old Icelandic animal name. However, auðr can also mean 'fate' and 'desolate; desert', and so Auðhum(b)la may also have been understood as the 'destroyer of the desert'. This semantic ambiguity may have been intentional.

== Attestations ==
Auðumbla's sole attested narrative occurs in the Gylfaginning section of the Prose Edda, and her name appears among ways to refer to cows later in the Nafnaþulur section of the book. In Gylfaginning, Gangleri (described earlier in Gylfaginning as king Gylfi in disguise) asks where, in the distant past, Ymir lived and what he ate. High says that the cow Auðumbla's teats produced four rivers of milk, from which Ymir fed. Gylfi asks what Auðumbla ate, and High says that she licked salty rime stones for sustenance. He recounts that Auðumbla once licked salts for three days, revealing Búri: The first day she licked free his hair, the second day his head, and the third day his entire body.

The second and final mention of Auðumbla occurs in the Nafnaþulur, wherein the author provides a variety of ways to refer to cows. Auðumbla is the only cow mentioned by name, and the author adds that "she is the noblest of cows".

== Scholarly reception and interpretation ==
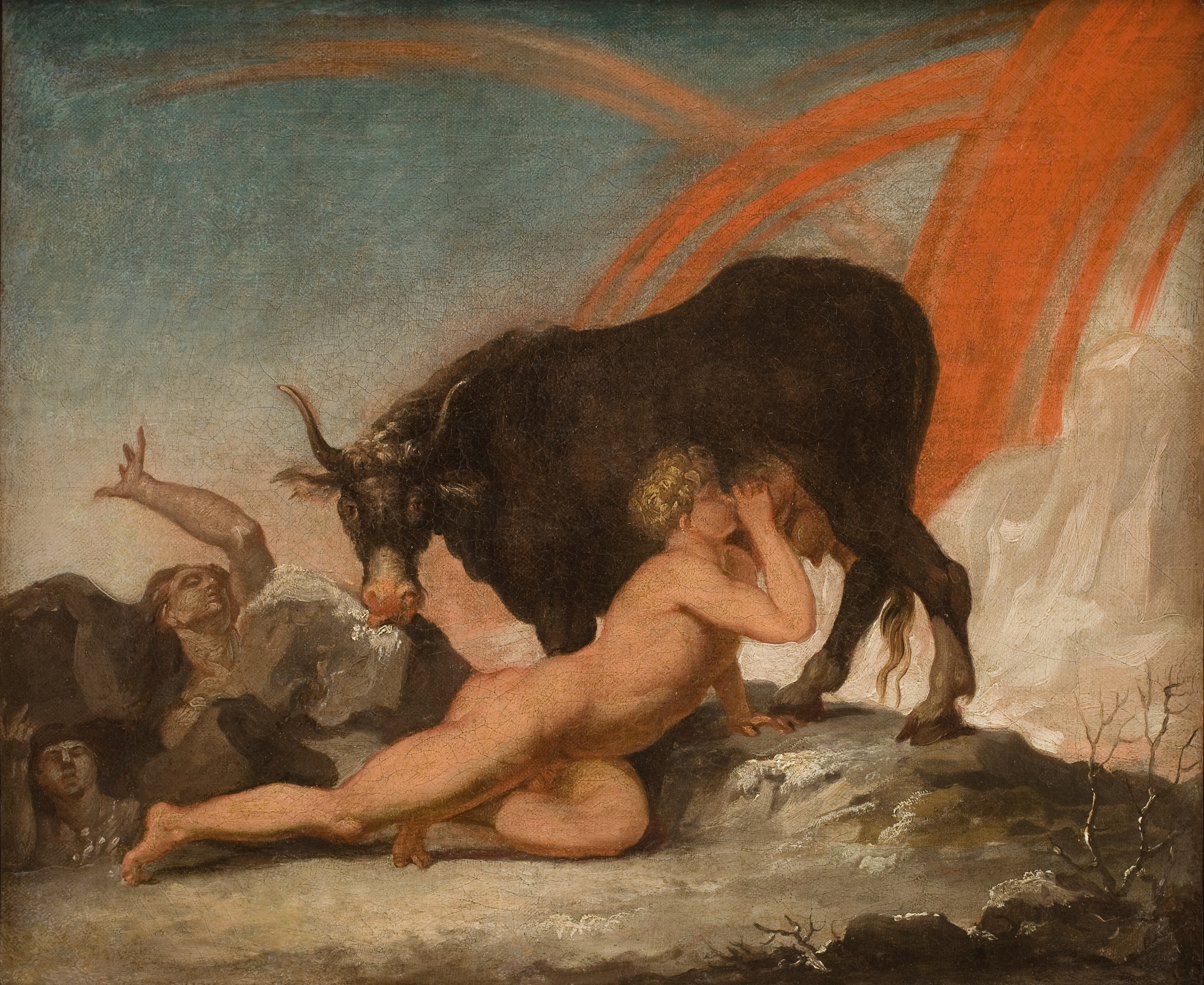
The primordial being Ymir suckles at the udder of Auðumbla as she licks Búri out of the ice in a painting by Nicolai Abildgaard, 1790

On the topic of Auðumbla, John Lindow says that cows appear commonly in creation narratives around the world, yet "what is most striking about Audhumla is that she unites the two warring groups in the mythology, by nourishing Ymir, ancestor of all the giants, and bringing into the light Búri, progenitor of the æsir."

Rudolf Simek highlights that Roman senator Tacitus's first century CE work ethnography of the Germanic peoples Germania mentions that they maintained hornless cattle (see name section above), and notes that the Germania relates how an image of the Germanic goddess Nerthus was borne through the countryside in a wagon drawn by cattle. Simek compares the deity to a variety of cow-associated deities among non-Germanic peoples, such as the Egyptian goddess Hathor (depicted as cow-headed) and Isis (whose iconography contains references to cows), and the Ancient Greek Hera (described as 'the cow-eyed').

== See also ==
- Amalthea, goat who raised Zeus, who suckled on her breast milk, in Classical Greek mythology
- Bull of Heaven, a celestial bull from Sumerian mythology
- El, creator bull deity in Canaanite mythology
- Gavaevodata, primordial cow in Zoroastrian mythology
- Heiðrún, a nanny goat in Norse mythology whose teats produce mead for the Einherjar
- Kamadhenu, cow from Hindu mythology
- Hathor, cow goddess from Egyptian mythology
- Mehet-Weret, celestial cow from Egyptian mythology
- Mithras' tauroctony, a Roman deity who killed a primeval bull
