= Lick Creek (St. Francis River tributary) =

Stream in the US state of Missouri

Coordinates: 36°41′37″N 90°08′21″W

Lick Creek is a stream in Stoddard County in the U.S. state of Missouri. It is a tributary of the St. Francis River which it enters within the Otter Slough Conservation Area.

Lick Creek was so named on account of a mineral lick near its course.

== See also ==
- List of rivers of Missouri
