= Carroll Creek (Clear Creek tributary) =

Stream in Missouri, United States

Coordinates: 39°20′22″N 94°19′05″W

Carroll Creek is a stream in Clay and Clinton counties in the U.S. state of Missouri. It is a tributary of Clear Creek.

Carroll Creek has the name of a pioneer citizen.

== See also ==
- Tributaries of the Fishing River
- List of rivers of Missouri
