= African Zion Baptist Church =

Historic church in West Virginia, United States

- U.S. National Register of Historic Places
- U.S. Historic district – Contributing property
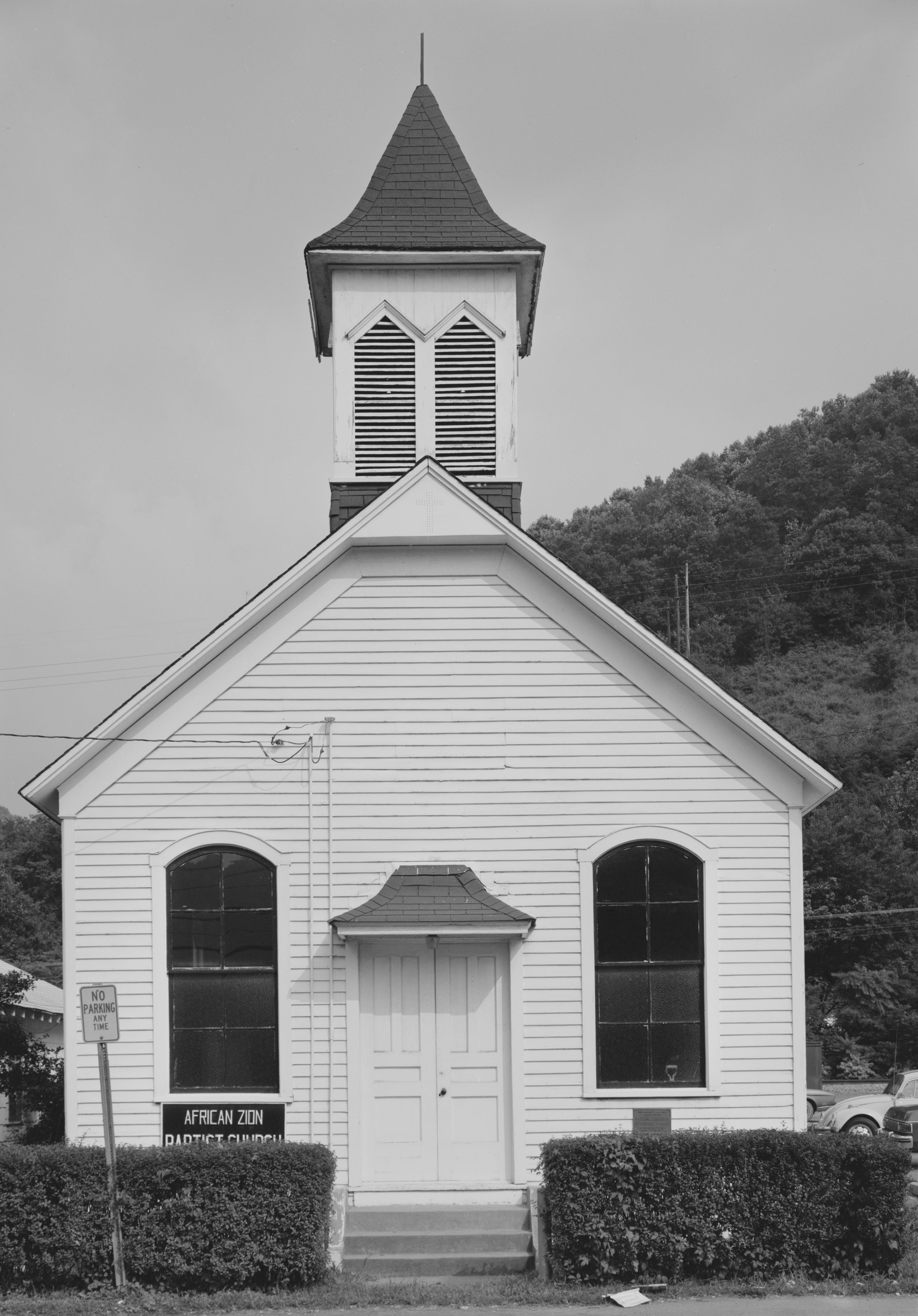
- African Zion Baptist Church, September 1979

- Location within West Virginia Location within the United States
- Location: 4104 Malden Dr., Malden, West Virginia
- Coordinates: 38°17′58″N 81°33′26″W
- Area: 0.5 acres (0.20 ha)
- Built: 1872
- NRHP reference No.: 74002010
- Added to NRHP: December 27, 1974

African Zion Baptist Church is a historic Baptist church at 4104 Malden Drive in Malden, Kanawha County, West Virginia. It is within the Malden Historic District.

It is a one-story frame structure built atop a stone foundation. It has a gable roof topped by a wooden bell tower. This is considered the mother church of African-American Baptists in West Virginia, many of whom migrated there after the American Civil War and Reconstruction. Among its noted members were "Father" Lewis Rice, founder of the church and a leader of the early African-American community in the Kanawha Valley of West Virginia, and Booker T. Washington.

It was listed on the National Register of Historic Places in 1974.
