= Brushy Creek (Fishing River tributary) =

Stream in Missouri, U.S.

Coordinates: 39°19′22″N 94°25′23″W

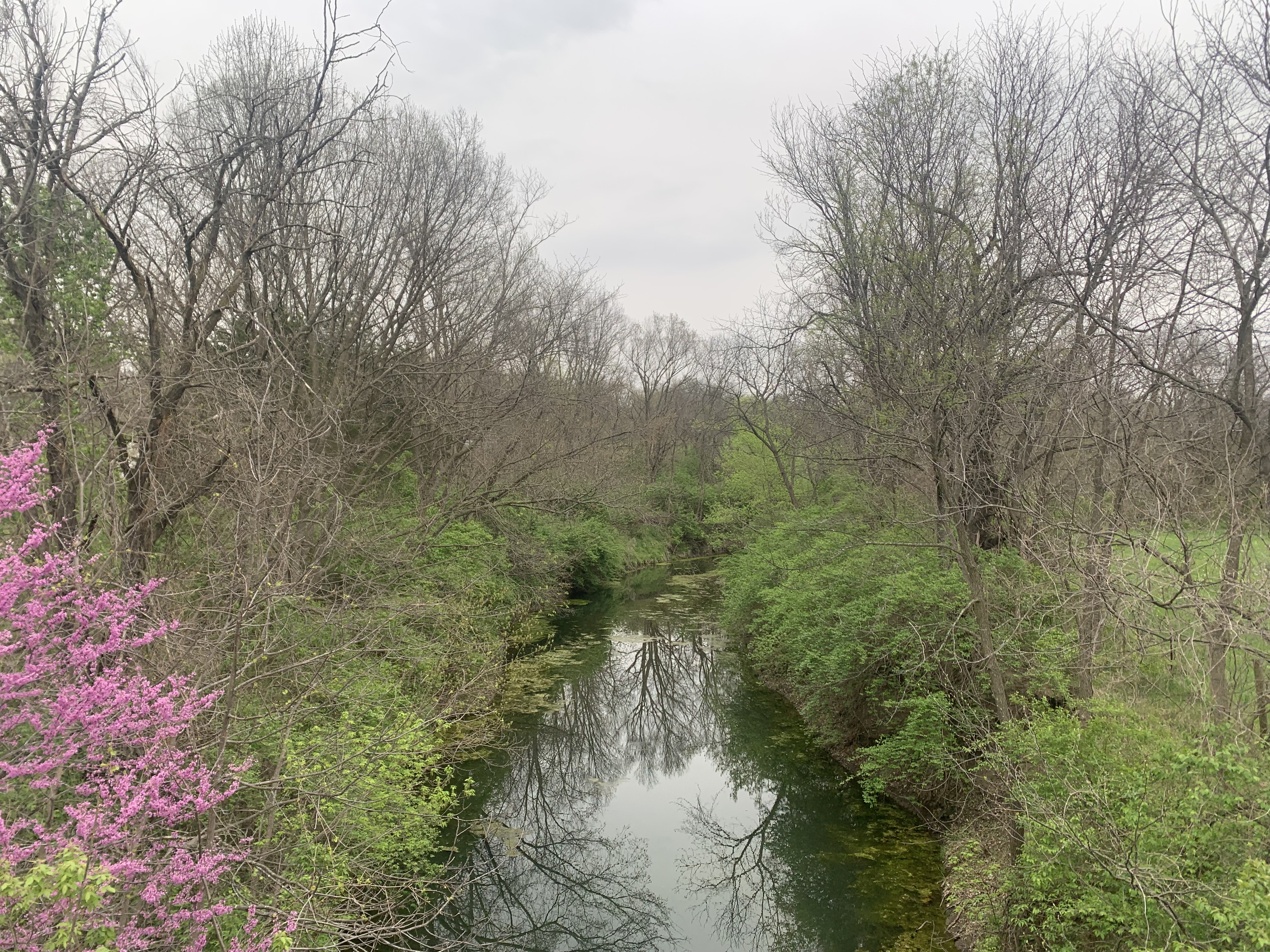
Brushy Creek on Missouri Route A bridge in Liberty Township, Clay County, Missouri

Brushy Creek is a stream in Clay County in the U.S. state of Missouri. It is a tributary of the Fishing River.

Brushy Creek was so named on account of brush lining its banks.

== See also ==
- Tributaries of the Fishing River
- List of rivers of Missouri
