= Bogart Creek =

Stream in the American state of Missouri

Coordinates: 39°15′36″N 94°10′34″W

Bogart Creek is a stream in Ray County in the U.S. state of Missouri. It is a tributary of the Fishing River.

Bogart Creek has the name of Alexander Bogart, an early settler.

== See also ==
- Tributaries of the Fishing River
- List of rivers of Missouri
