= Lick Creek (Smith Creek tributary) =

Stream in the American state of Missouri

Coordinates: 38°33′36″N 92°41′58″W

Lick Creek is a stream in Moniteau and Morgan County in the U.S. state of Missouri. It is a tributary of Smith Creek.

Lick Creek was so named on account of mineral licks near its course.
