= Clear Creek (Fishing River tributary) =

Stream in the U.S. state of Missouri

Clear Creek is a stream in Clay and Clinton counties of northwest Missouri. It is a tributary of the Fishing River.

The headwaters of the stream are in Clinton County southwest of Lathrop and it flows south-southwest into Clay County turning to the southeast to the east of Arley. It then passes under U.S. Route 35 and Missouri Route 92 east of Kearney and on to its confluence with Fishing River just north of U.S. Route 69 to the northwest of Mosby.

The source area is at 39°32′14″N 94°21′07″W and the confluence is at 39°19′25″N 94°19′01″W.

Clear Creek was so named on account of its clear water.

== See also ==
- Tributaries of the Fishing River
- List of rivers of Missouri
