= Lick Creek (Fishing River tributary) =

Stream in the American state of Missouri

Coordinates: 39°16′30″N 94°12′33″W

Lick Creek is a stream in Ray County in the U.S. state of Missouri. It is a tributary of the Fishing River.

Lick Creek was so named on account of mineral licks in the area.

== See also ==
- Tributaries of the Fishing River
- List of rivers of Missouri
