= Crockett Creek =

Stream in Clay County, Missouri, U.S.

Coordinates: 39°18′49″N 94°18′47″W

Crockett Creek is a stream in Clay County in the U.S. state of Missouri. It is a tributary of the Fishing River.

Crockett Creek has the name of David Crockett, a local settler and relative of Davy Crockett.

== See also ==
- Tributaries of the Fishing River
- List of rivers of Missouri
