= Lick Creek (Duck River tributary) =

Stream in Tennessee, U.S.

Coordinates: 35.7867344°N 87.3113999°W

Lick Creek is a stream in Hickman, Maury and Williamson counties, Tennessee, in the United States. It is a tributary of Duck River.

Lick Creek was named for a mineral lick which attracted wildlife.

Its tributaries include Fort Cooper Creek.

== See also ==
- List of rivers of Tennessee
