= Lick Creek (Osage River tributary) =

Stream in the American state of Missouri

Coordinates: 38.2030898°N 92.4921269°W

Lick Creek is a stream in Miller County in the U.S. state of Missouri. It is a tributary of the Osage River.

Lick Creek was so named on account of mineral licks near its course which attracted deer.

== See also ==
- List of rivers of Missouri
