= Lick Creek (Henderson County, Tennessee) =

Stream in Tennessee, U.S.

Coordinates: 35.623681°N 88.291986°W

Lick Creek is a stream in the U.S. state of Tennessee. It is a tributary to the Beech River.

Lick Creek was named for mineral licks along its course which attracted deer.
