= Williams Creek (Fishing River tributary) =

Stream in the American state of Missouri

Coordinates: 39°18′22″N 94°16′31″W

Williams Creek is a stream in Clay County in the U.S. state of Missouri. It is a tributary of the Fishing River.

Williams Creek has the name of Ellis Williams, a pioneer citizen.

== See also ==
- Tributaries of the Fishing River
- List of rivers of Missouri
