= Malden, West Virginia =

- Unincorporated community
- Location within West Virginia and the United States Malden (the United States)
- Coordinates: 38°18′02″N 81°33′25″W
- Country: United States
- State: West Virginia
- County: Kanawha
- Post office established: 1814
- Time zone: UTC-5 (Eastern (EST))
  - Summer (DST): UTC-4 (EDT)
- ZIP codes: 25306

Malden — originally called Kanawha Salines — is an unincorporated community in Kanawha County, West Virginia, United States, within the Charleston metro area.

As of the 2020 census, Malden had a population of 444.

== History ==
The Kanawha Saline(s) post office was established in 1814 and discontinued in 1879. The community changed its name to Malden, establishing Malden PO in 1879; it closed in 1961. This probably means that Malden became a Rural Branch of Charleston in 1961. The present name most likely is derived from Malden, Massachusetts.

== Arts and culture ==
Malden is the location of the Salines salt wells, and the Booker T. Washington Park, owned and maintained by the West Virginia State University.

The African Zion Baptist Church and Malden Historic District are listed on the National Register of Historic Places.

== Notable people ==
Notable people from Malden include General Lewis Ruffner and his wife Viola Ruffner, and Booker T. Washington, president of Tuskegee Institute and a national African-American leader in the early 20th century.

== See also ==
- Kanawha saltworks
