= Carroll Creek (South Dakota) =

Stream in South Dakota, United States

Coordinates: 43.567202°N 103.627139°W

Carroll Creek is a stream in the U.S. state of South Dakota.

== History ==
Carroll Creek was named after Ben Carroll, an early settler.

== See also ==
- List of rivers of South Dakota
