= Williams Creek (Cole Camp Creek tributary) =

Stream in Benton County, Missouri, U.S.

Coordinates: 38.386689°N 93.258537°W

Williams Creek is a stream in Benton County in the U.S. state of Missouri. It is a tributary of Cole Camp Creek.

The name of Williams Creek is attributed to Ezekiel Williams, a pioneer settler.

== See also ==
- List of rivers of Missouri
