= Viola Ruffner =

American activist

Viola Knapp Ruffner (1812–1903) was a schoolteacher and became the second wife of General Lewis Ruffner, a salt and coal mine owner and community leader in Kanawha County, West Virginia. She played a role in the personal development of Booker T. Washington, who worked in their household as a teenager after Emancipation. He credited her with teaching him the essentials of the Puritan ethic. She and the General supported his causes and they became lifelong friends. In his autobiography, Dr. Washington described Mrs. Ruffner as "one of the best friends I ever had."

== Childhood, education, early career ==
She was born in Arlington, Vermont, and attended Bennington Academy, in Bennington, Vermont. Educated as a schoolteacher, she taught in North Carolina and New Jersey. She started her own school, but had to give the work up during an illness. While recuperating, she applied for a job as a governess for General Lewis Ruffner (1797-1883), a widower who was member of the Virginia General Assembly and community leader in the area which is now Charleston, West Virginia. She married the General in 1843.

== Booker T. Washington ==
Young Booker came to Malden, West Virginia with his mother Jane after the Emancipation in late 1865. Following other jobs of manual labor including working in the salt mines, he served as the Ruffner family's houseboy.

According to the first of his autobiographies, Up From Slavery, Mrs. Ruffner had a harsh reputation for her rigid and strict manner, was feared by her servants and could only keep temporary employees due to her demands and expectations. A New England-trained school teacher, she was a conservative and hardworking person who valued education, cleanliness, promptness, and honesty above all else. She taught Washington the value of a dollar, and encouraged him to further his schooling, allowing him to attend school for an hour each day. Washington expresses his extreme respect and utmost regard for Ruffner, calling her "one of the best friends I ever had."

Viola and Lewis Ruffner remained key benefactors of Washington's political and civil efforts, with Viola and Booker T. Washington continuing their strong friendship after the General died in 1883 until her death 20 years later.

In modern times, the Ruffner and Washington families are still good friends, and had a reunion in Charleston, West Virginia in 2002. The Ruffners attend the Washington family reunion at Hampton annually, and both families still contribute to causes for the growth of society.
