= Lewis Ruffner =

American politician (1797–1883)

Member of the West Virginia House of Delegates from the Kanawha County district
- In office July 1, 1864-1865

Member of the West Virginia House of Delegates from the Kanawha and Roane Counties district
- In office July 1, 1861-1863

Wheeling Convention
- In office May 1861

Member of the Virginia House of Delegates from the Kanawha district
- In office December 5, 1825-December 2, 1827 Serving with Van B. Reynolds, James H. Fry
- Preceded by: Joseph Lovell
- Succeeded by: James C. MacFarland

Member of the Virginia House of Delegates from the Kanawha County district
- In office December 3, 1821-December 1, 1822 Serving with Joseph Lovell
- Preceded by: Nathaniel W. Thompson
- Succeeded by: James Wilson

Personal details
- Born: October 1, 1797 Charleston, West Virginia US
- Died: November 19, 1883 (aged 86) Malden, West Virginia, US
- Party: Republican
- Spouse(s): Elizabeth Shrewsbury, Viola Ruffner
- Relatives: Henry Ruffner, Patti Ruffner Jacobs
- Profession: Politician, manufacturer, merchant

Military service
- Allegiance: United States; Union
- Branch/service: infantry US Army; Union Army
- Years of service: 1863
- Rank: General
- Unit: West Virginia militia

Lewis Ruffner (October 1, 1797 – November 19, 1883) was an American merchant, magistrate, slaveowner, and politician who helped found the state of West Virginia. Originally a salt manufacturer in the Kanawha Salines (renamed Malden), Ruffner served several terms in the Virginia House of Delegates representing Kanawha County before resigning as he became the company's agent in Louisville, Kentucky, but returned to Virginia in 1857. Although a slaveowner with relatives who fought for the Confederacy, Ruffner became a prominent Unionist, represented Kanawha County during the Wheeling Conventions, initial West Virginia Constitutional Convention, and first West Virginia House of Delegates during the American Civil War. Fellow legislators named him Major General of the state's militia in 1863, but he declined to accept a commission in the Union Army because salt manufacture was also crucial to the war effort. After the war, General Ruffner suffered a debilitating injury trying to avert a mob attack and became known as a mentor of Booker T. Washington, his former houseboy.

== Early and family life ==
On October 1, 1797, the former Mennonite minister's daughter, Anna Brombach Ruffner (1766–1852) gave birth to Lewis Ruffner, who became the first white child born in Kanawha County, in what became West Virginia in his lifetime. Their father David Ruffner (1767–1843) was descended from German or Swiss emigrants. His father (Lewis' grandfather), Joseph Ruffner Sr., had farmed near Luray, Virginia in the Shenandoah Valley and in 1794 bought land across the Appalachian Mountains in the Kanawha River Valley from John Dickinson, including a famous salt spring. After visiting the property the following year, he moved to the Kanawha Valley, joined within a year by his five sons, daughter and their families. Joseph Ruffner bought additional land nearby, as well as the defensive Clendenin Blockhouse, into which his firstborn son David Ruffner moved with his wife and children in 1796 (and in which Lewis Ruffner was born). The blockhouse was eventually sold to James Wilson, who would later succeed Lewis Ruffner in the Virginia legislature.

Meanwhile, when Joseph Ruffner Sr. died in 1803, his property was divided among his sons David (Lewis's father), Daniel, Joseph Jr., Samuel, Abraham and Tobias. David Ruffner received the property closest to the future city of Charleston (the whole bottom from the mouth of Campbell's Creek to the cross line above Malden), including the famous salt lick, which Joseph Sr. had allowed Elisha Brooks to lease and try to develop. Soon, David and his brother Joseph Jr. decided to develop it themselves, and after resolving lawsuits involving Dickinson's heirs as well as their brother Abraham's share sold to Andrew Donnally Jr. In 1805 David Ruffner bought a mill and house from George Alderson and moved his family to the "Kanawha Salines" (renamed "Malden" in the 1850s), where he began developing the salt works (a/k/a salines). They would make several technical innovations, including drilling through the rock to secure stronger brine for boiling evaporation. The salt industry came to use mostly enslaved labor, so that from 1810 to 1820, the number of slaves in Kanawha county tripled, from 352 to 1073. The slave population was 1,717 in 1830 and reached its highest census-recorded number at 3,140 slaves in 1850, many of them leased and purchased in Kentucky or Eastern Virginia. By 1810, the 11 salt furnaces in the Kanawha valley led national salt production, producing 540,000 bushels annually of the key ingredient needed to preserve meat.

Meanwhile, between 1799 and 1812 (when Joseph Jr. moved to Cincinnati), Kanawha County voters several times elected David Ruffner as one of their two representatives (on a part-time basis) in the Virginia House of Delegates. By 1815 (with demand soaring because the war made British salt unavailable), the number of salt furnaces in the Kanawa Valley had reached 52 and extended four miles below and 3 miles above the original Ruffner operation, and wood to fire the boiling evaporation vats was becoming scarce, until David Ruffner managed to convert that part of the operation to coal, which was discovered nearby. In 1817, David (sometimes referred to using the honorific "Colonel") and his brothers Joseph Jr and Daniel Ruffner were among the founders of the Kanawha Salt Company, a local trust or salt production monopoly formed at the instigation of lawyer Joseph Lovell, with whom Lewis Ruffner would later serve in the legislature.

During his father's development of the salt industry, young Lewis Ruffner attended various schools, first one in Charleston run by Herbert P. Gaines and later by Levi Welch, then in 1808 he went to a school in Scott County, Kentucky, and in 1812 was sent to Rev. John McElhenny's academy in Lewisburg. After the War of 1812 ended in early 1815, Lewis Ruffner continued his studies in Cincinnati. In 1816 Lewis was sent to Lexington, Virginia to study at Washington College (later Washington and Lee University) for two years, following a course laid by his elder brother Henry Ruffner, who became a Presbyterian minister and built a church in his hometown before returning to Washington College to teach and serve as its president.

On November 20, 1826, Lewis Ruffner married Elizabeth Shrewsbury, daughter of another early saline manufacturer, Joel Shrewsbury, and who bore David Henry Ruffner (1835–1862), Lewis Ruffner Jr. (1837–1910), Joel S. Ruffner (1840–1908), and two daughters who survived to adulthood. Almost a year after her death in January 1843, Lewis Ruffner married Viola (née Knapp) Ruffner (1812–1903), a Vermont-born schoolteacher in Hamilton County, Ohio on December 2, 1843. They would have son Ernest Howard Ruffner (1845–1937) and daughter Stella Blanche Ruffner Wiley (1849–1932). Lewis Ruffner's granddaughter (Lewis Jr's daughter), Patti Ruffner Jacobs, became a prominent suffragist in Birmingham, Alabama.

== Career ==
In 1818, having completed his education, Lewis Ruffner taught school for a year, then joined in his father's salt operations, which became his career. In the first three years he made several innovations, including a new furnace to better use coal and using a steam engine to drill wells, and took over the business from his father in 1823 (although father his David Ruffner would become judge of the county court and live another two decades). They managed to secure protective tariffs after severe problems circa 1825 due to vessels using foreign salt as ballast, and after George H. Patrrick of New York developed a new process to remove the red from the evaporated salt, the salt business saw its greatest prosperity (despite an unfavorable sketch of Kanawha County by Anne Royall in a book published in 1826).

Like his father, Lewis Ruffner won election as one of Kanawha County's two representatives in the Virginia House of Delegates. During his first term, which began in 1821, he served alongside Joseph Lovell (who had helped his father, uncles and neighbors establish the Kanawha Salt Company). However, Lewis Ruffner was not re-elected until 1825, when he replaced Lovell as one of Kanawha County's delegates, then won re-election the following year. He did not seek reelection in 1828, perhaps in part because he was elected a local magistrate, a post he held until he moved to Louisville, Kentucky in 1845.

His father had died in 1843, and Louis Ruffner continued in the salt trade in Louisville, as agent for the Kanawha Salt trust now facing competition from salines in Kentucky, Illinois, Ohio as well as mines in New York. Joel Shrewsbury, William Dickenson, John Dickinson Lewis and Lewis Ruffner were sometimes called the "Salt Kings of Kanawha". In Louisville, Lewis Ruffner attended the Presbyterian Church led by Dr. Stuart Robinson. In 1846, the Kanawha salt business had its peak year, producing over 3 million bushels, which with associated barrel production, lumber, boat building and shipping businesses made Malden one of Virginia's wealthiest communities, albeit with considerable pollution, thus many of the wealthiest producers built homes in Charleston downriver. In 1847, four years after their father's death, his brother Rev. Henry Ruffner published a controversial pamphlet that argued slavery was impeding Virginia's economic development, and after resigning as president of Washington College, spent some time with Lewis and his family in Louisville, before himself returning to Malden. On February 28, 1849, Lewis Ruffner joined an emancipation society in Louisville. In 1840 Lewis Ruffner owned 20 slaves in Kanawha County, and in 1850 owned 47 slaves there, and probably indirectly owned others, although not a partner in the county's largest slaveholder, the Shrewsbury and Dickinson saltworks. In 1857 Lewis Ruffner returned to Malden to manage the salt operations, as a depression which had hit the salt industry, driving all but nine salt manufacturing companies out of business by 1860 and reducing the county's slave population to 2,184 persons. In the 1860 census, Lewis Ruffner and his wife, son and daughter lived with his cousin Silas Ruffner (Tobias Ruffner's son and a decade his junior) and his wife Eliza in Kanawha County.

Although a slaveowner with relatives who fought for the Confederacy, Ruffner became a prominent Unionist, leading recruitment of a home guard unit at Malden, as well as represented Kanawha County during the Wheeling Conventions, initial West Virginia Constitutional Convention, and first West Virginia House of Delegates during the American Civil War. Fellow legislators named him Major General of the state's militia in 1863 (hence references to him as "General Ruffner"), but he declined to accept a commission in the Union Army, and salt manufacture was also crucial to the war effort. Meanwhile, Confederates occupied the salt works in late 1862, and his son David Henry Ruffner died that December. Union forces destroyed the salt works to stop further shipments of the valuable commodity to the Confederacy, although John P. Hale (who had joined the Confederate Army in 1861) reorganized it in 1864, with "Gen. L. Ruffner" as "General Advisory Agent".

== Postwar life and Booker T. Washington ==
As war ended, General Ruffner ceased political activity, perhaps compounded by an injury he received in 1868, when he tried to remonstrate with a mob of about 100 white men upset with labor competition and specifically with four or five black men who arrived in Malden from his land in Tinkerville to view a trial. A thrown stone hit Ruffner just above his ear. He fell unconscious and never fully recovered, suffering many memory and vision problems, and needing crutches to walk. In 1873, he turned over his business affairs to his son Lewis Ruffner Jr. (who had returned to Malden after selling salt in St. Louis, Missouri and Evansville, Indiana) and other trustees for the benefit of his children, reserving only an annuity for himself and his wife. During the war, the stepfather of Booker T. Washington, who had been a leased slave at the salt works, returned with his newly emancipated family to join them. Young Washington worked at several manual jobs, including at the salt works, before the General and his (second) wife hired him as a houseboy. According to the first of Washington's autobiographies, Up From Slavery, Mrs. Ruffner had a harsh reputation for her rigid and strict manner, was feared by her servants and could only keep temporary employees due to her demands and expectations. Conservative and hardworking, she valued education, cleanliness, promptness, and honesty above all else. She taught Washington the value of a dollar, and encouraged him to further his schooling, allowing him to attend school for an hour each day. Washington expresses his extreme respect and utmost regard for Ruffner, calling her "one of the best friends I ever had." Mrs. Ruffner inspired Washington to seek an education and the couple and famous African American educator became lifelong friends.

In 1872 Washington left Malden to attend Hampton Institute at the age of sixteen. Viola and Lewis Ruffner remained key benefactors of Washington's political and civil efforts, with Viola and Booker T. Washington continuing their strong friendship until her death.

== Death and legacy ==
Lewis Ruffner died at his Malden home on November 19, 1883. His youngest son, Ernest Ruffner (who graduated from the U.S. Military Academy at West Point in 1867), became a career engineer in the U.S. Army, and for a time supervised the $2 million federal Lock and Dam Improvement Project on the Kanawha River. Since 1980 Malden has been a nationally recognized historic district, including both the stone Presbyterian church and the clapboard African Zion Baptist Church whose construction he helped fund.

The Kanawha saltworks never recovered from the increased competition of the 1850s, wartime depredations and the crash of 1873. Furthermore, a group of businessmen swindled the Kanawha Salt Company in 1882. By 1890 only the J.Q. Dickinson works continued saltmaking in Malden, ceasing production in 1945. In modern times, the Ruffner and Washington families remain good friends, and had a reunion in Charleston, West Virginia in 2002. Ruffner descendants attend the Washington family reunion at Hampton annually, and both families still contribute to causes for the growth of society.
