= Astronaut photo =

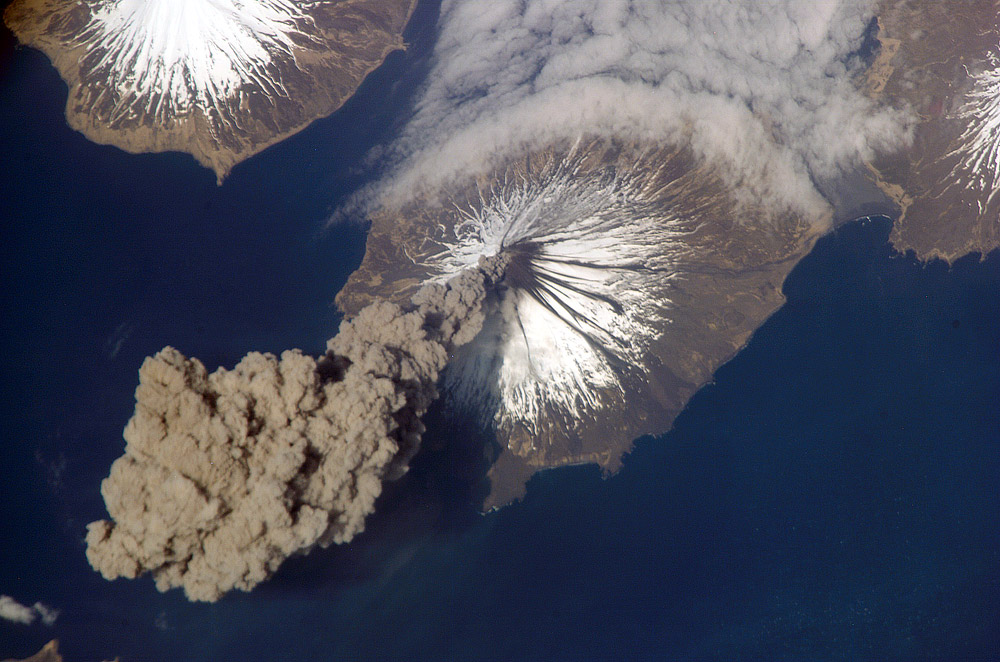
An astronaut photo of the eruption of Mt. Cleveland, an Alaskan volcano

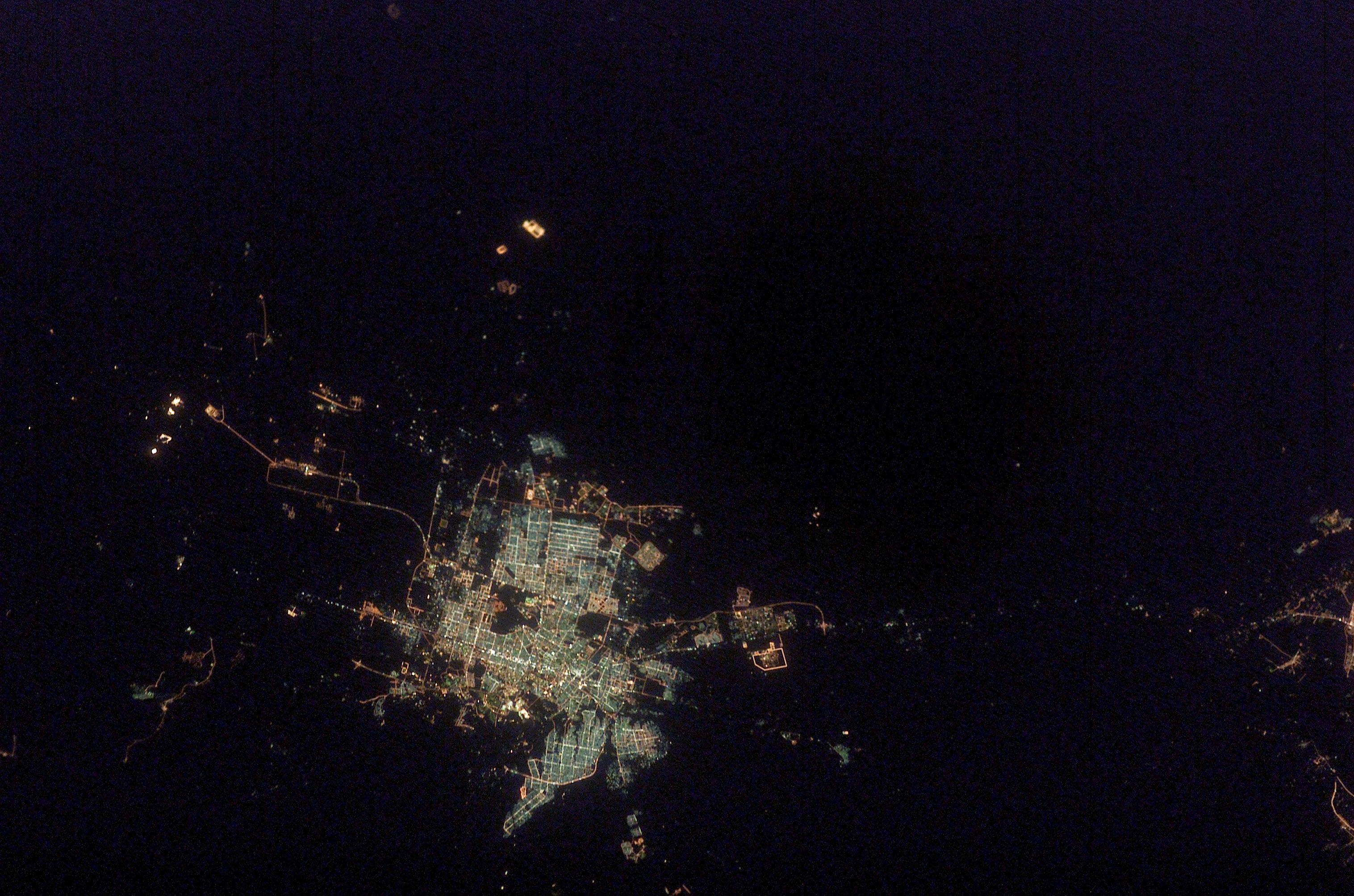
An astronaut photo of the city of Riyadh, Saudi Arabia at night

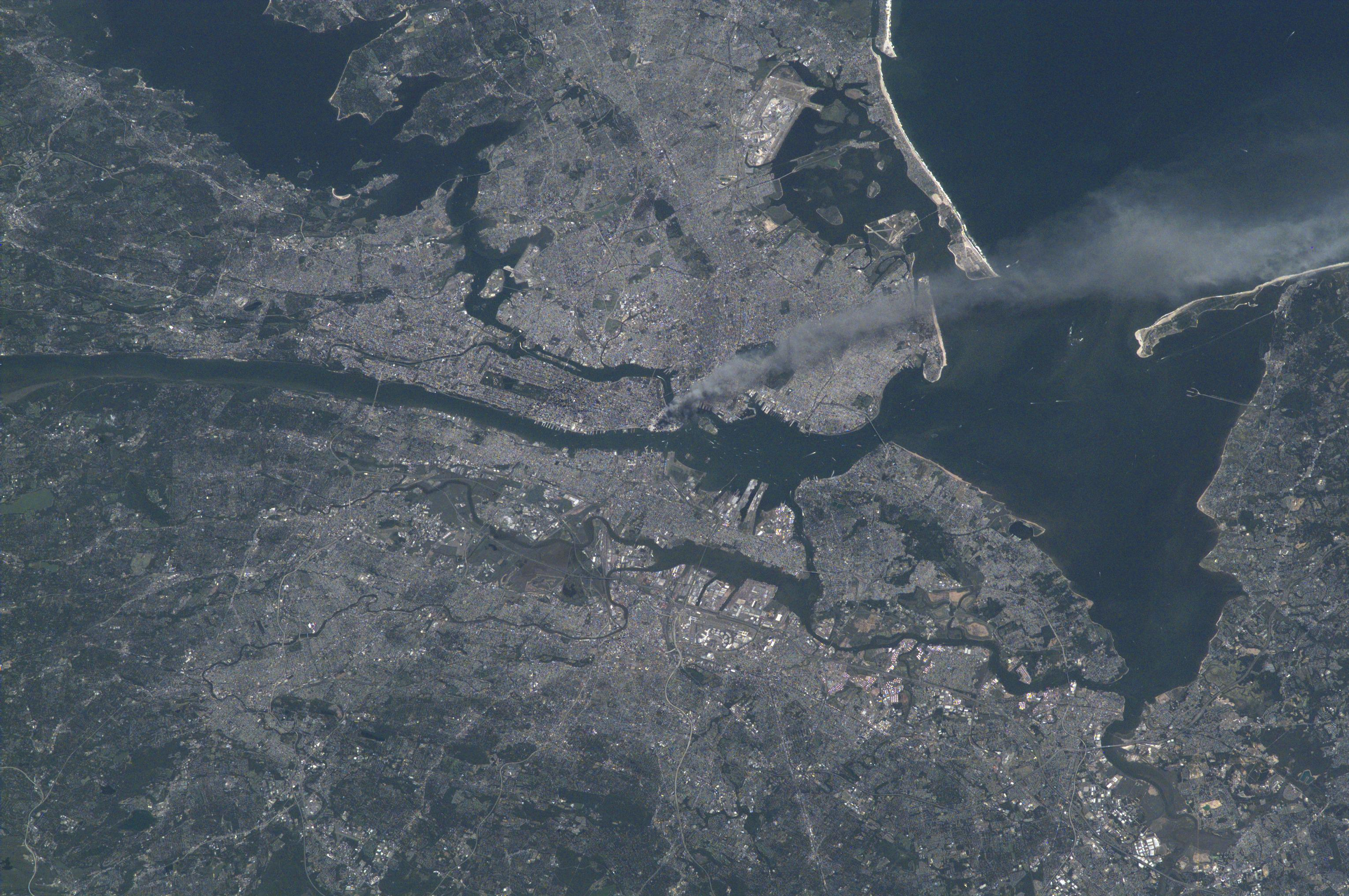
An astronaut photo of New York City during the September 11 attacks

An astronaut photo is a photograph taken by an astronaut or cosmonaut. Astronaut photography, or orbital astrophotography, is distinct from images captured by onboard spacecraft cameras, satellites, space telescopes, or by earthbound photographers. Astronauts may be provided with an array of professional-grade cameras or use their personal phone cameras to capture images of space travel, their fellow astronauts, planets, earth satellites, the spacescape around them, and geographic landmarks of Earth. Astronaut photos have been used to document planetary weather phenomena, for instance in 2025 an astronaut photo depicted a red sprite, or interactions between the atmosphere and outer space such as the aurora borealis. Astronauts also study the impact of humans on the planet, such as nighttime photos of city lights.

Specialists called flight operations imagery instructors train NASA astronauts in photography technique at the Johnson Space Center in Houston, Texas, United States. Confounding circumstances unique to astronaut photography include that "being exo-atmospheric, the sun is a lot brighter" in space and thus photographers must adjust their cameras, and that the astronauts and the vistas tend to pass by each other quite quickly.

== See also ==
- Earthrise
- The Blue Marble
- Earthset
- Space art
- Space selfie
- Donald R. Pettit
- Monkey selfie copyright dispute
