= Fishing River =

Stream in Missouri, U.S.

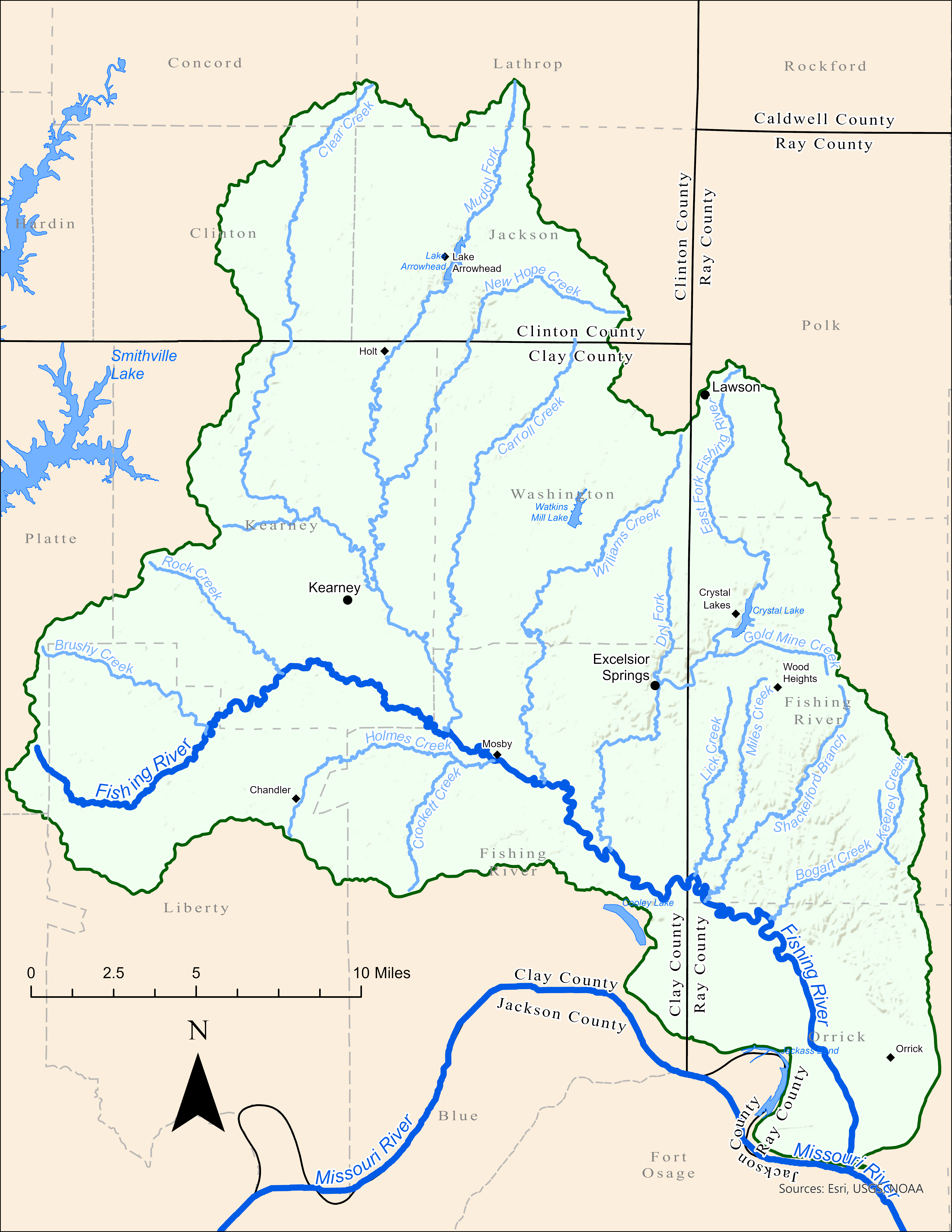
Watershed map of the Fishing River in Missouri.

The Fishing River is a 39-mile-long (63 km) tributary of the Missouri River in western Missouri in the United States. It rises in the northeastern extremity of Kansas City in Clay County and flows generally eastward and southeasterly through Clay and southwestern Ray counties, past the town of Mosby. It joins the Missouri River about 3 miles (5 km) south of the town of Orrick.

Downstream of Mosby, it collects the East Fork Fishing River, which rises at the town of Lawson and flows 20.6 miles (33.2 km) generally southward through Ray and Clay counties, through the resort community of Crystal Lake and past the town of Excelsior Springs.

== History ==
In 1808, William Clark of the Lewis and Clark Expedition established Fort Osage along the Missouri near the mouth of the Fishing River. The fort became a center of trade among European settlers and Native Americans in the region.

Fishing River was named for the fact that it contained an abundance of fish.

== Location ==
Mouth
Confluence with the Missouri River in Ray County, Missouri: 39°10′31″N 94°08′27″W
Source
Clay County, Missouri: 39°18′53″N 94°29′45″W

== Tributaries ==
=== Ray County ===
- Keeney Creek
- Bogart Creek
- Shackelford Branch
- Lick Creek
  - Miles Creek

=== Clay County ===
- East Fork Fishing River
  - Dry Fork
  - Gold Mine Creek
- Williams Creek
- Holmes Creek
  - Crockett Creek
- Clear Creek
  - Carroll Creek
  - Muddy Fork
    - New Hope Creek
  - Gilmore Branch
- Rock Creek
- Brushy Creek

== See also ==
- List of tributaries of the Missouri River
- List of Missouri rivers
