= Williams Creek (Spring River tributary) =

Stream in southwest Missouri, U.S.

Williams Creek is a stream in the Lawrence County of southwest Missouri. It is a tributary of the Spring River.

The stream headwaters are located at 37°06′00″N 93°42′25″W and its confluence with the Spring River is at 37°06′41″N 93°53′30″W. The stream begins as an intermittent stream in the vicinity of Missouri Route K southwest of Chesapeake. The stream flows west to northwest passing under Interstate 44, passing north of Mount Vernon and under Missouri Route 39. It continues to the west joining the Spring River to the east of Stotts City.

Williams Creek has the name of a pioneer settler.

== See also ==
- List of rivers of Missouri
