= Malden Historic District =

Historic district in West Virginia, United States

- U.S. National Register of Historic Places
- U.S. Historic district
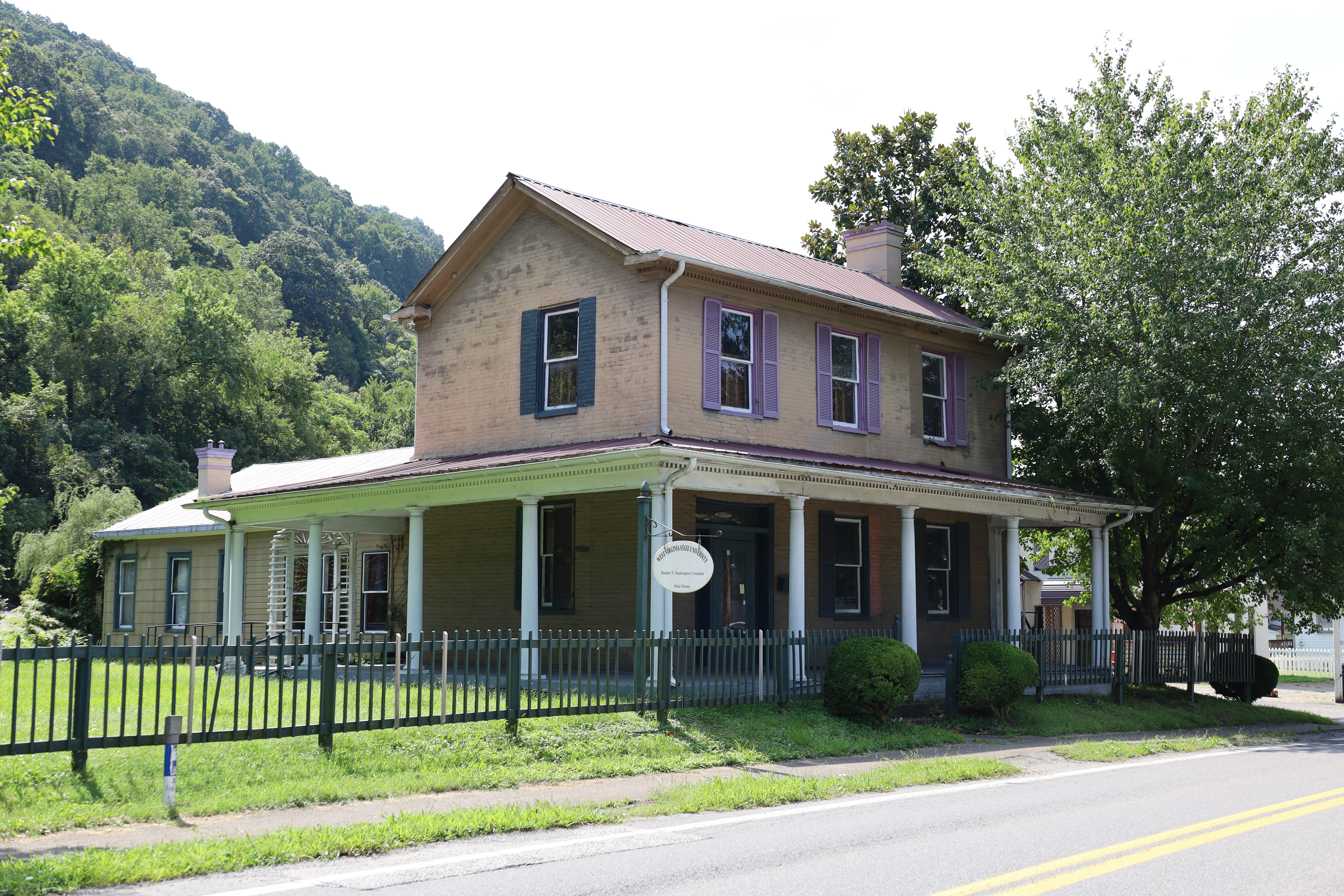
- Hale House in 2021

- Location within West Virginia Location within the United States
- Location: Roughly bounded by RR tracks, Kanawha River, Georges Dr. and U.S. 60, Malden, West Virginia
- Coordinates: 38°17′49″N 81°33′35″W
- Area: 68 acres (28 ha)
- Architect: Multiple
- Architectural style: Late Victorian, Federal
- NRHP reference No.: 80004028
- Added to NRHP: July 18, 1980

Malden Historic District is a national historic district located within the town of Malden, located in Kanawha County, West Virginia.

== Description ==
The district includes 95 contributing buildings. It includes residential, commercial, ecclesiastical, and industrial buildings dated as early as the 1830s.

Notable buildings include the Richard E. Putney House (1836), Kanawha Salines Presbyterian Church (1840), and J. Q. Dickinson & Company building. Located within the district is the separately listed African Zion Baptist Church.

The Malden Historic District was listed on the National Register of Historic Places in 1980.
