= Búri =

Norse mythical character

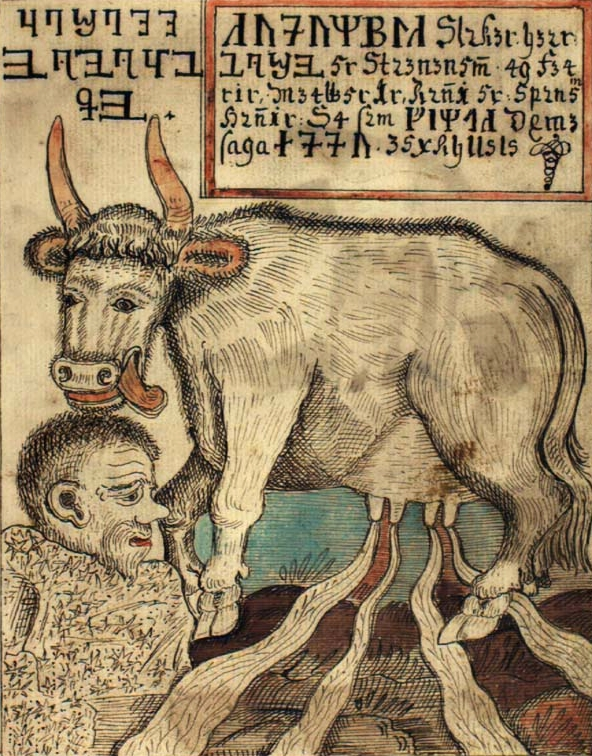
Búri is licked out of a salty ice-block by the cow Auðumbla in this illustration from an 18th-century Icelandic manuscript.

In Norse mythology, Búri (Old Norse: [ˈbuːre]) is a divinity god. Some believe he is the ancestor of Odin and therefore an early ancestor of the Æsir gods of the principal pantheon in Old Norse religion. Búri was licked free from salty rime stones by the primeval cow Auðumbla over the course of three days.

Búri's background beyond this point is unattested; some sources indicate he had a son, Borr, by way of an unknown process, but it is debated whether or not they represent the same figure; if so, then Búri was Odin's father, and if not, than he was Odin's grandfather through Borr.

Búri is attested in the Prose Edda, composed in the 13th century by Icelander Snorri Sturluson. The Prose Edda includes a quote from a 12th-century poem by skald Þórvaldr Blönduskáld that mentions the figure. Búri's mysterious origins are the subject of scholarly commentary and interpretation.

== Name ==
The name Búri, like the name of his son Burr, is derived from the Proto-Germanic *buriz "son, born". Thus, both names basically mean the same thing. In research, Buri's name is translated as "begotten, father" and Burr as "begotten, son" - probably because of the generational sequence. However, how he fathered his son is not explained; either by himself or through sexual reproduction.

== Attestations ==
Búri receives mention twice in the Prose Edda—once in Gylfaginning and again in a skaldic poem quoted in Skáldskaparmál. The Gylfaginning section reads as follows:

Hon sleikti hrímsteinana er saltir váru. Ok hinn fyrsta <dag> er hon sleikti steina, kom ór steininum at kveldi manns hár, annan dag manns höfuð, þriðja dag var þar allr maðr. Sá er nefndr Búri. Hann var fagr álitum, mikill ok máttugr. Hann gat son þann er Borr hét.

Translation:

She licked the ice-blocks, which were salty; and the first day that she licked the blocks, there came forth from the blocks in the evening a man's hair; the second day, a man's head; the third day the whole man was there. He is named Búri: he was fair of feature, great and mighty. He begat a son called Borr[.]

— Brodeur's translation

Búri is mentioned nowhere in the Poetic Edda and only once in the skaldic corpus. In Skáldskaparmál Snorri quotes the following verse by the 12th century skald Þórvaldr blönduskáld:

Nú hefk mart
í miði greipat
burar Bors,
Búra arfa.

Translation:

Now have I snatched
much of the mead [made a lot of poetry]
of Buri's heir
Bor's son [Odin]

— Faulkes' translation
