= Mosby, Missouri =

- City
- Location of Mosby, Missouri
- Coordinates: 39°18′59″N 94°18′34″W
- Country: United States
- State: Missouri
- County: Clay
- Incorporated: 1956

Area
  - Total: 1.81 sq mi (4.69 km^{2})
  - Land: 1.81 sq mi (4.68 km^{2})
  - Water: 0.0077 sq mi (0.02 km^{2})
- Elevation: 761 ft (232 m)

Population (2020)
  - Total: 101
  - Density: 56/sq mi (21.6/km^{2})
- Time zone: UTC-6 (Central (CST))
  - Summer (DST): UTC-5 (CDT)
- ZIP code: 64073
- Area code: 816
- FIPS code: 29-50168
- GNIS feature ID: 2395415

Mosby is a city in Clay County, Missouri, United States, along the Fishing River. The population was 101 at the 2020 census. It is part of the Kansas City metropolitan area.

== History ==
A post office called Mosby was established in 1887, and remained in operation until 1999. The city was named after A. G. Mosby, the original owner of the site.

== Geography ==
According to the United States Census Bureau, the city has a total area of 2.09 square miles (5.41 km^{2}), of which 2.08 square miles (5.39 km^{2}) is land and 0.01 square miles (0.03 km^{2}) is water.

== Demographics ==
Historical population
Census	Pop.	Note	%±
1920	73		—
1930	200		174.0%
1940	218		9.0%
1950	213		−2.3%
1960	293		37.6%
1970	337		15.0%
1980	284		−15.7%
1990	194		−31.7%
2000	242		24.7%
2010	190		−21.5%
2020	101		−46.8%
U.S. Decennial Census

=== Racial and ethnic composition ===
Mosby city, Missouri – Racial and ethnic composition Note: the US Census treats Hispanic/Latino as an ethnic category. This table excludes Latinos from the racial categories and assigns them to a separate category. Hispanics/Latinos may be of any race.
Race / Ethnicity (NH = Non-Hispanic)	Pop 2000	Pop 2010	Pop 2020	% 2000	% 2010	% 2020
White alone (NH)	221	183	81	91.32%	96.32%	80.20%
Black or African American alone (NH)	0	2	0	0.00%	1.05%	0.00%
Native American or Alaska Native alone (NH)	1	0	1	0.41%	0.00%	0.99%
Asian alone (NH)	5	1	0	2.07%	0.53%	0.00%
Native Hawaiian or Pacific Islander alone (NH)	0	0	0	0.00%	0.00%	0.00%
Other race alone (NH)	0	0	0	0.00%	0.00%	0.00%
Mixed race or Multiracial (NH)	11	1	14	4.55%	0.53%	13.86%
Hispanic or Latino (any race)	4	3	5	1.65%	1.58%	4.95%
Total	242	190	101	100.00%	100.00%	100.00%

=== 2010 census ===
At the 2010 census there were 190 people, 72 households, and 47 families living in the city. The population density was 91.3 inhabitants per square mile (35.3/km^{2}). There were 87 housing units at an average density of 41.8 per square mile (16.1/km^{2}). The racial makup of the city was 97.4% White, 1.1% African American, 0.5% Asian, 0.5% from other races, and 0.5% from two or more races. Hispanic or Latino of any race were 1.6%.

Of the 72 households, 29.2% had children under the age of 18 living with them, 47.2% were married couples living together, 9.7% had a female householder with no husband present, 8.3% had a male householder with no wife present, and 34.7% were non-families. 26.4% of households were one person, and 7% were one person aged 65 or older. The average household size was 2.64 and the average family size was 3.21.

The median age was 40.3 years. 20.5% of residents were under the age of 18; 13.6% were between the ages of 18 and 24; 21.5% were from 25 to 44; 33.6% were from 45 to 64; and 10.5% were 65 or older. The gender makeup of the city was 56.3% male and 43.7% female.

=== 2000 census ===
At the 2000 census there were 242 people, 79 households, and 57 families living in the city. The population density was 157.3 inhabitants per square mile (60.7/km^{2}). There were 94 housing units at an average density of 61.1 per square mile (23.6/km^{2}). The racial makup of the city was 91.32% White, 0.41% Native American, 2.07% Asian, 1.65% from other races, and 4.55% from two or more races. Hispanic or Latino of any race were 1.65%.

Of the 79 households, 44.3% had children under the age of 18 living with them, 54.4% were married couples living together, 11.4% had a female householder with no husband present, and 27.8% were non-families. 22.8% of households were one person, and 11.4% were one person aged 65 or older. The average household size was 3.06 and the average family size was 3.54.

In the city the population was spread out, with 36.8% under the age of 18, 7.9% from 18 to 24, 34.7% from 25 to 44, 14.0% from 45 to 64, and 6.6% 65 or older. The median age was 28 years. For every 100 females, there were 128.3 males. For every 100 females age 18 and over, there were 112.5 males.

The median household income was $33,333 and the median family income was $33,250. Males had a median income of $30,263 versus $14,688 for females. The per capita income for the city was $12,617. About 20.0% of families and 18.7% of the population were below the poverty line, including 26.2% of those under the age of eighteen and none of those 65 or over.

== Education ==
The vast majority of Mosby is in the Excelsior Springs 40 School District. Small pieces of the city limits are within the Liberty 53 School District and the Kearney R-I School District.
