= Mineral lick =

Place where animals can lick essential mineral nutrients

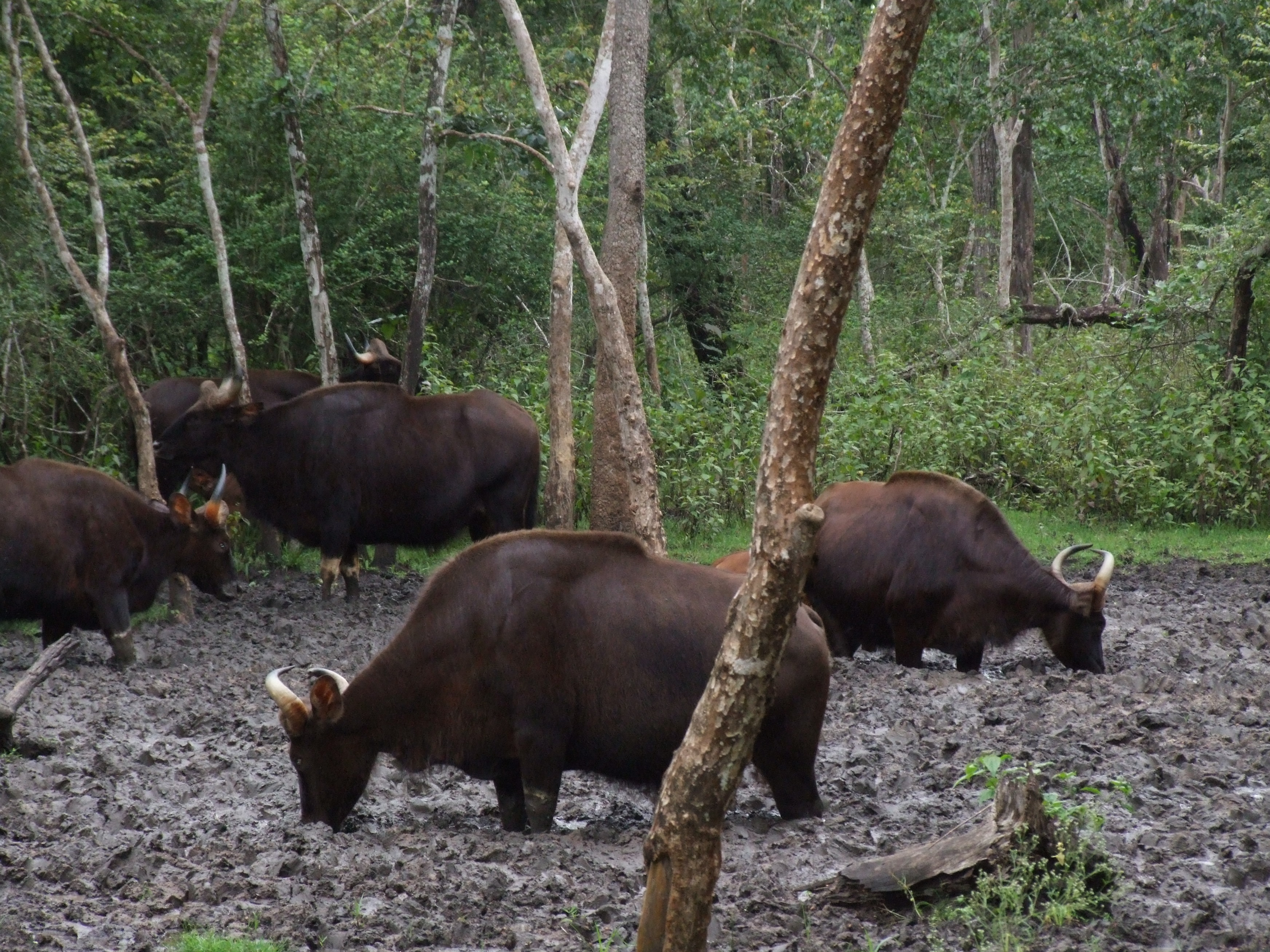
Gaur at a natural salt lick

A mineral lick (also known as a salt lick) is a place where animals can go to lick essential mineral nutrients from a deposit of salts and other minerals. Mineral licks can be naturally occurring or artificial (such as blocks of salt that farmers place in pastures for livestock to lick). Natural licks are common, and they provide essential elements such as phosphorus and the biometals (sodium, calcium, iron, zinc, and trace elements) required for bone, muscle and other growth in herbivorous mammals such as deer, moose, elephants, hippos, rhinos, giraffes, zebras, wildebeests, tapirs, woodchucks, fox squirrels, mountain goats, porcupines, and frugivorous bats. Such licks are especially important in ecosystems such as tropical rainforests and grasslands with poor general availability of nutrients. Harsh weather exposes salty mineral deposits that draw animals from miles away for a taste of needed nutrients. It is thought that certain fauna can detect calcium in salt licks.

== Overview ==
Many animals regularly visit mineral licks to consume clay, supplementing their diet with nutrients and minerals. In tropical bats, lick visitation is associated with a diet based on wild figs (Ficus), which have very low levels of sodium, and licks are mostly used by females that are pregnant or lactating.

Some animals require the minerals at these sites not for nutrition, but to ward off the effects of secondary compounds that are included in the arsenal of plant defences against herbivory. The minerals of these sites usually contain calcium, magnesium, sulfur, phosphorus, potassium, and sodium. Mineral lick sites play a critical role in the ecology and diversity of organisms that visit these sites, but little is still understood about the dietary benefits.

The paths animals made to natural mineral licks and watering holes became the hunting paths predators and early humans used for hunting. It is hypothesized that these salt and water paths became trails and later roads for early humans.

Nonetheless, many studies have identified other uses and nutritional benefits from other micronutrients that exist at these sites, including selenium, cobalt and/or molybdenum. In addition to the utilization of mineral licks, many animals suffer from traffic collisions as they gather to lick salts accumulated on road surfaces. Animals also consume soil (geophagy) to obtain minerals, such as moose from Canada mining for minerals from the root wads of fallen trees.

== Artificial salt licks ==
Artificial salt licks are used in the husbandry of livestock and to attract or maintain wildlife, whether it be for viewing, photography, farming, or hunting purposes. Maintaining artificial salt licks as a form of baiting is illegal in some states in the United States, but legal in others. Inadvertent salt licks may lead to unintended wildlife–human interactions.

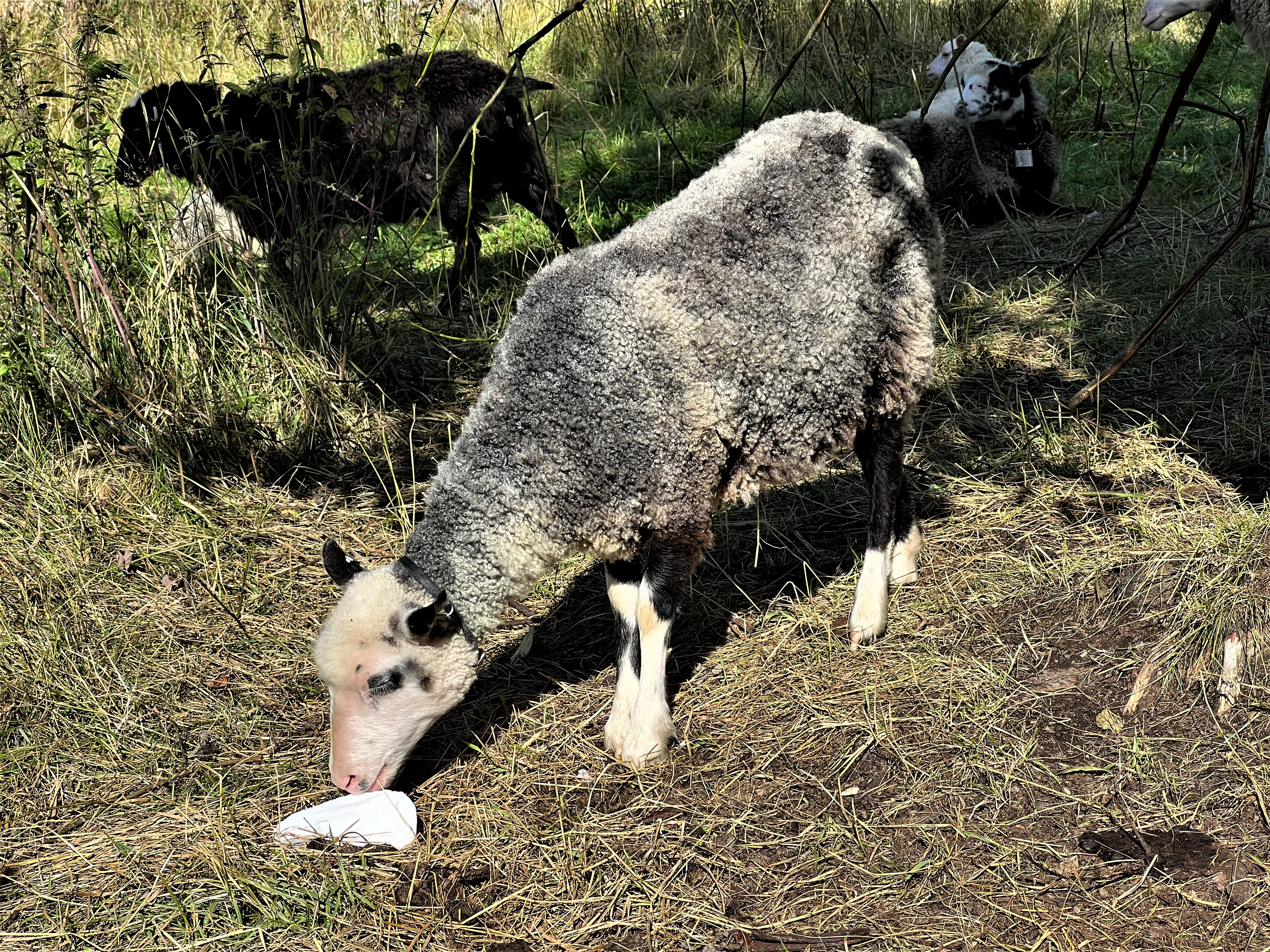
Svärdsjö sheep, an endangered Swedish local breed, licking salt

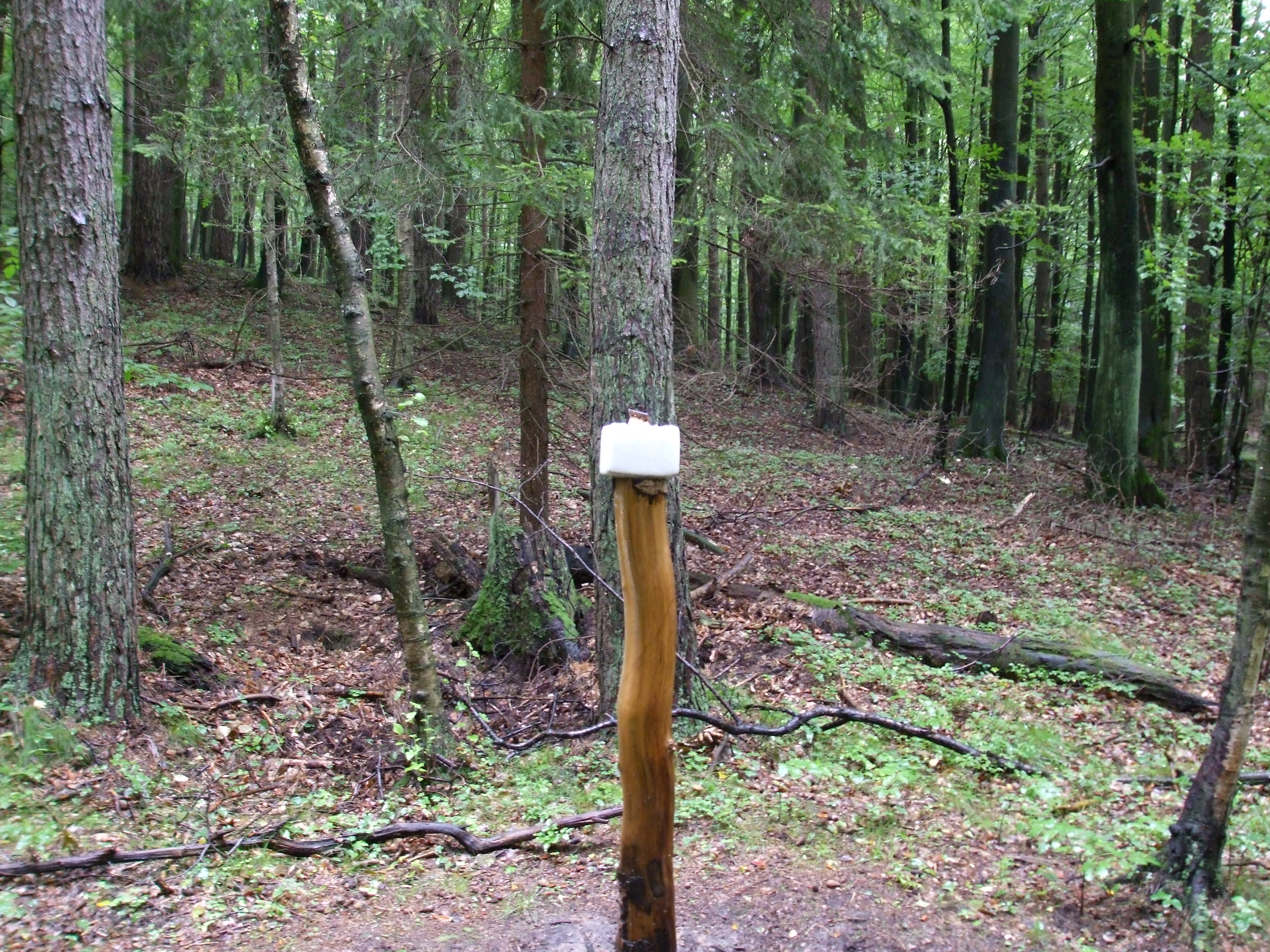
Block of salt mounted on a post in Sopot, Poland

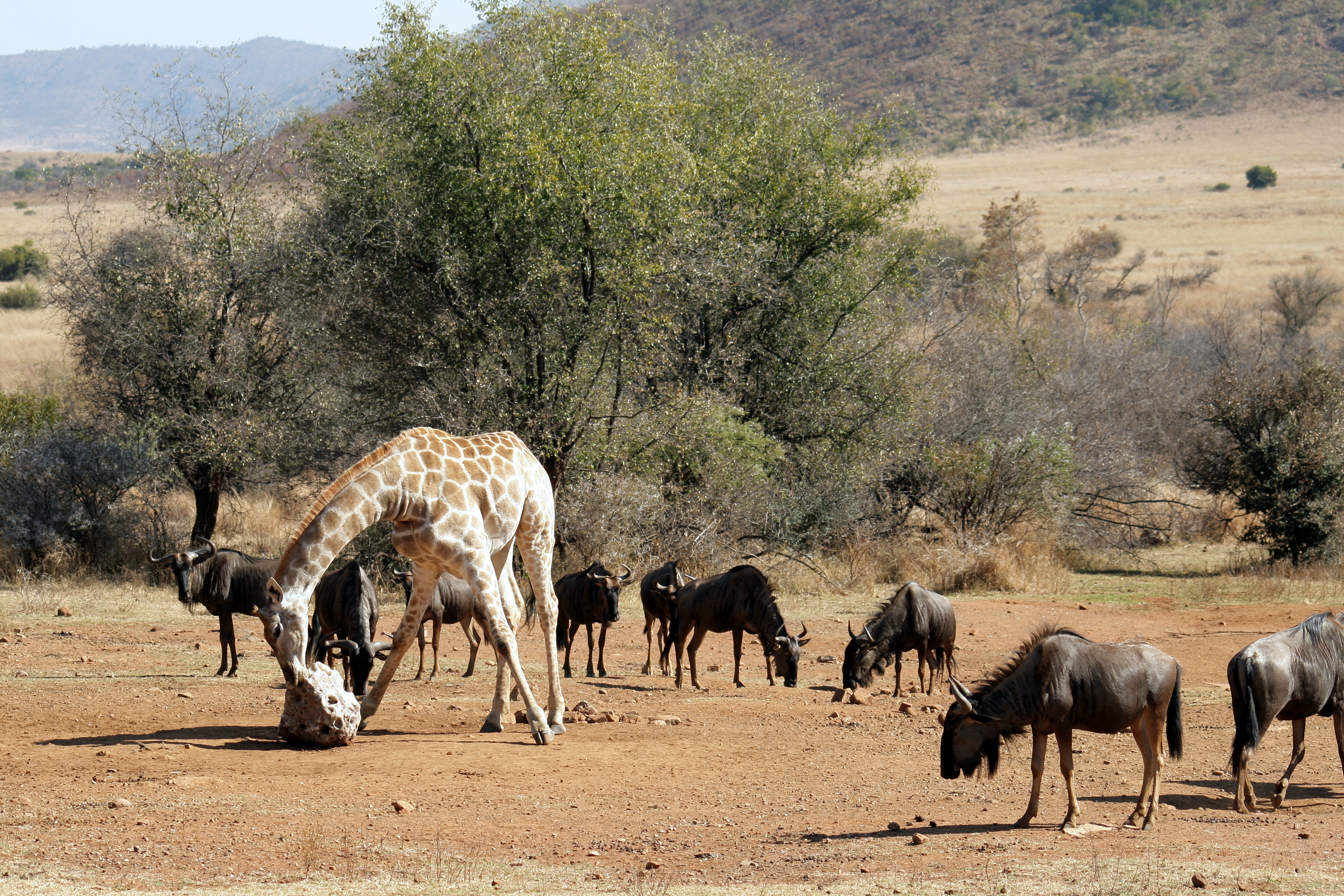
Giraffe and wildebeest at an artificial salt lick in the Pilanesberg Game Reserve, South Africa

== History ==
=== In the Americas ===
The indigenous peoples of the Americas and the longhunter watched salt licks to hunt game. Many became well-known, including Bledsoe Lick in Sumner County, Tennessee; the Blue Lick in central Kentucky; 'Great Buffalo Lick' in Kanawha Salines, now present-day Malden, West Virginia; the French Lick in southern Indiana; and the Blackwater Lick in Blackwater, Lee County, Virginia.

=== Mythology ===
In Norse mythology, before the creation of the world, the primordial cow Auðumbla licked salty ice for three days and uncovered Búri, ancestor of the Æsir (Norse gods) and the grandfather of Odin. On the first day as Auðumbla licked, Buri's hair appeared from the ice; on the second day his head; and the third his body.

== See also ==
- Saltern
- Zoopharmacognosy
