= List of Washington and Lee University people =

Below is a list of notable associated people of Washington and Lee University in Lexington, Virginia, United States. The year after each name designates the graduation year, if the person is an alumnus.

== Law and politics ==
- Robert H. Adams, 1806 – United States senator from Mississippi
- Samuel B. Avis, Law – United States congressman from West Virginia, 1913–1915
- Ronald J. Bacigal, Law 1967 – professor of law, University of Richmond School of Law
- Robert D. Bailey Jr., Law – West Virginia secretary of state, 1965–1969
- Meredith Attwell Baker, 1990 – former Federal Communications Commission commissioner; president of CTIA
- Newton D. Baker, Law 1894 – secretary of war under President Woodrow Wilson, mayor of Cleveland, Ohio, and named partner at BakerHostetler
- Matt Bevin, 1989 – 62nd governor of Kentucky
- Bill Brock, 1953 – former U.S. senator from Tennessee (1971–77), chairman of the National Republican Party (1977–81); U.S. trade representative (1981–85); secretary of labor (1985–87)
- Franklin Brockson, Law – United States congressman from Delaware, 1913–1915
- William T. Brotherton Jr., Law – chief justice of the Supreme Court of West Virginia, 1989–1994
- Clarence J. Brown, Law 1915 – president of Brown Publishing Company and U.S. congressman from Ohio, 1939–1965
- Nathan P. Bryan, Law 1895 – U.S. senator from the State of Florida, judge on the United States Court of Appeals for the Fifth Circuit
- William James Bryan, Law 1899 – U.S. senator from Florida
- Archibald C. Buchanan, Law 1914 – justice on the Supreme Court of Virginia
- Bruce L. Castor Jr., Law 1986 – district attorney, Montgomery County, Pennsylvania (2000–2008); commissioner, Montgomery County, Pennsylvania (2008–2016); attorney general (interim) and first solicitor general of Pennsylvania 2016; president, Pennsylvania District Attorneys' Association, presidential impeachment lead defense counsel 2021
- Lewis Preston Collins II, Law – lieutenant governor of Virginia
- Christian Compton, 1950, Law 1953 – justice of the Supreme Court of Virginia, 1974–2006
- Edward Cooper, Law 1892 – U.S. congressman from West Virginia, 1915–1919
- Spencer Cox, W&L law, 2001 – inaugurated as governor of Utah in 2021; chairman of the Republican Governors Conference
- William Fadjo Cravens, Law – U.S. congressman from Arkansas
- T. Kenneth Cribb Jr., 1970 – former Reagan aide and former president of the Intercollegiate Studies Institute
- John J. Crittenden, 1805 – speaker of the Kentucky House of Representatives; U.S. senator, governor of Kentucky, U.S. attorney general under presidents William Henry Harrison and Millard Fillmore; proposed the Crittenden Compromise to keep the Union intact
- George William Crump, 1804 – member of the United States House of Representatives; first recorded streaker in American history
- John J. Davis, Law 1856 – United States representative from West Virginia
- John W. Davis, 1895, Law 1892 – 1924 Democratic nominee for United States president; Ambassador to Britain; solicitor general; argued more cases before the Supreme Court than anyone else in the twentieth century; American Bar Association president; first president of the Council on Foreign Relations; named partner at Davis Polk & Wardwell
- Mark Steven Davis, Law 1988 – United States district court judge for the Eastern District of Virginia
- John W. Eggleston, Law 1910 – chief justice of the Virginia Supreme Court, 1958–1969
- Gay Elmore, Law – two-time Southern Conference Men's Basketball Player of the Year
- Sarah Feinberg, 1999 – interim president of the New York City Transit Authority, and former administrator of the Federal Railroad Administration
- John P. Fishwick Jr., Law – United States attorney for the United States District Court for the Western District of Virginia
- Henry S. Foote, 1919 – 19th governor of Mississippi
- Vance A. Funk, III, Law 1968 – mayor of Newark, Delaware
- Maciej Golubiewski (born 1976) – Polish political scientist and consul general of the Republic of Poland in New York City
- John Goode, Law – 3rd solicitor general of the United States; United States Congressman from Virginia
- John W. Goode – attended undergraduate school 1939–1942 but transferred to the University of Texas at Austin; attorney and Republican political figure in his native San Antonio, Texas
- Bob Goodlatte, Law 1977 – U.S. congressman from Virginia
- R. Booth Goodwin, Law 1996 – United States attorney for the Southern District of West Virginia
- Herbert B. Gregory, Law 1911 – justice on the Virginia Supreme Court, 1930–1951
- Robert J. Grey Jr., Law 1976 – American Bar Association president 2004–2005
- Morgan Griffith, Law 1983 – congressman from Virginia
- Duncan Lawrence Groner, Law 1894 – U.S. attorney; federal district judge for United States District Court for the Eastern District of Virginia; chief judge of the United States Court of Appeals for the D.C. Circuit
- Pike Hall Jr., attended 1940s – judge in Shreveport, Louisiana
- Alexander Harman, Law – justice on the Supreme Court of Virginia, 1969–1979
- James Hay, Law 1877 – United States representative from Virginia; federal judge on the United States Court of Claims
- George Washington Hays, Law – governor of Arkansas, 1913–1917
- Homer A. Holt, 1918, Law 1923 – governor of West Virginia, 1937–1941
- Linwood Holton, 1944 – governor of Virginia, 1970–1974
- James Murray Hooker, Law 1896 – U.S. congressman from Virginia
- J. Bennett Johnston Jr., 1953 – U.S. senator from Louisiana, 1972–1997; Washington, D.C.-based lobbyist
- Jerrauld Jones, Law 1980 – judge on the Norfolk Circuit Court
- Walter Kelley, 1977, Law 1981 – former federal judge in the Eastern District of Virginia and current partner at Hausfeld
- James L. Kemper, Law 1842 – governor of Virginia; Confederate General wounded during Pickett's Charge at Gettysburg
- Jackson L. Kiser, Law 1952 – judge on the United States District Court for the Western District of Virginia
- Ruby Laffoon, Law 1890 – governor of Kentucky
- Joseph Rucker Lamar, Law 1878 – Associate Justice of the Supreme Court of the United States of the United States Supreme Court (1911–1916), justice of the Supreme Court of Georgia (1903–1905)
- Edwin Gray Lee, Law 1859 – brigadier general in the Confederate States of America
- Harry Jacob Lemley, Law 1910 – federal judge on both the United States District Court for the Eastern District of Arkansas and the United States District Court for the Western District of Arkansas
- Scott Marion Loftin, Law 1899 – U.S. senator from Florida; president of the American Bar Association
- Mary Beth Long, Law 1998 – former Assistant Secretary of Defense for International Security Affairs at the United States Department of Defense and former attorney with Williams & Connolly LLP
- Daniel B. Lucas, Law – poet; justice on the Supreme Court of West Virginia, 1889–1892
- J. Michael Luttig, 1976 – assistant attorney general, Office of Legal Council and counselor to the attorney general; former United States Circuit Court of Appeals judge; twice considered by President George W. Bush for nomination to the U.S. Supreme Court; current executive vice president and general counsel, The Boeing Company
- John Ashton MacKenzie, Law 1939 – federal judge for the United States District Court for the Eastern District of Virginia
- John Otho Marsh Jr., Law 1951 – Secretary of the Army, 1981–1989, United States congressman
- Robert Murphy Mayo, Law 1859 – United States representative from Virginia
- Hayes McClerkin, 1953 – former speaker of the Arkansas House of Representatives; Texarkana, Arkansas attorney
- Alexander McNutt – 12th governor of Mississippi
- Thomas Chipman McRae, Law – governor of Arkansas, United States representative
- John Marks Moore – secretary of state of Texas, 1887–1891
- Jackson Morton, 1814 – U.S. senator from Florida
- Robert Mosbacher, 1947 – Secretary of Commerce, 1989–1992
- Mark Obenshain, Law 1987 – member of the Senate of Virginia; Republican nominee for attorney general of Virginia in the 2013 Virginia election
- Robert E. Payne, Law 1967 – judge for the United States District Court for the Eastern District of Virginia
- Mosby Perrow Jr. – Virginia senator (1943–1964); key figure in Virginia's abandonment of "Massive Resistance" to desegregation
- Archer Allen Phlegar – Virginia Supreme Court justice, Virginia state senator
- Miles Poindexter, Law 1891 – senator from the State of Washington
- Lewis Franklin Powell Jr., 1929, Law 1931 – associate justice of the United States Supreme Court (1972–1987); president of the American Bar Association; named partner at Hunton Williams Gay Powell & Gibson
- William Ray Price Jr., Law 1978 – longest-serving judge and former chief justice of the Supreme Court of Missouri
- Prescott Prince, Law 1983 – attorney defending Khalid Sheikh Mohammed
- Lacey E. Putney, Law – longest-serving member of the Virginia House of Delegates in the history of the Virginia General Assembly
- Heartsill Ragon, Law – U.S. congressman from Arkansas; federal judge on the United States District Court for the Western District of Arkansas
- Robert W. Ray, Law 1985 – partner at Pryor Cashman LLP in New York City and former head of the U.S. Office of the Independent Counsel (succeeded Kenneth Starr)
- Alfred E. Reames, Law 1893 – U.S. senator from Oregon
- Pat Robertson, 1950 – Christian televangelist; founder of several organizations, including Christian Broadcasting Network, the Christian Coalition, the American Center for Law and Justice, and Regent University; host of The 700 Club; candidate for the Republican nomination for president in 1988
- Daniel K. Sadler, Law – justice on the New Mexico Supreme Court
- Jared Y. Sanders Jr., attended 1912–1913 – member of the United States House of Representatives from Louisiana's 6th congressional district
- Tom Sansonetti, Law 1976 – United States assistant attorney general for the United States Department of Justice Environment and Natural Resources Division
- William H. Smathers – senator from the State of New Jersey
- Abram Penn Staples, Law 1908 – attorney general of Virginia; justice on the Supreme Court of Virginia
- Lawrence Vess Stephens, Law 1877 – governor of Missouri
- Roscoe B. Stephenson Jr., 1943, Law 1947 – justice on the Supreme Court of Virginia
- Charles L. Terry Jr. – governor of Delaware 1961–1965
- Thomas Todd, 1783 – United States Supreme Court justice nominated by Thomas Jefferson
- Paul S. Trible Jr. Law 1971 – former U.S. senator from Virginia, president of Christopher Newport University
- William M. Tuck, Law 1921 – governor of Virginia
- Henry St. George Tucker III, Law 1876 – U.S. congressman from Virginia; president of the American Bar Association
- James Clinton Turk, Law 1952 – federal judge and chief judge (1973–1993) on the United States District Court for the Western District of Virginia
- David Gardiner Tyler, Law 1869 – U.S. representative, son of President John Tyler, present at Lee's surrender at Appomattox
- Sol Wachtler, Law – former chief judge of the New York Court of Appeals (1985–1993)
- John W. Warner Jr., 1949 – former secretary of the Navy and retired U.S. senator from Virginia; for a time, a husband of Elizabeth Taylor
- Junius Edgar West, Law – 22nd lieutenant governor of Virginia
- Kennon C. Whittle, Law 1914 – justice on the Supreme Court of Virginia and president of the Virginia Bar Association
- H. Emory Widener Jr., Law 1953 – judge for the United States Court of Appeals for the Fourth Circuit
- Seward H. Williams, Law 1895 – U.S. congressman from Ohio
- Joe Wilson, 1969 – congressman from South Carolina who shouted "You lie!" at President Obama during the 2010 State of the Union address
- John Minor Wisdom, 1925 – judge, United States Court of Appeals for the Fifth Circuit
- Harry M. Wurzbach, Law 1896 – U.S. congressman from Texas

== Business ==
- Drew Baur, 1966 – businessman and owner of St. Louis Cardinals
- Berry Boswell Brooks – cotton broker and big-game hunter
- Christopher Chenery, 1909 – industrialist and horse breeder of Secretariat
- Richard L. Duchossois – industrialist, investor, and director of Churchill Downs
- Kenn George, 1970 – businessman/investor and former member of the Texas House of Representatives
- Rupert H. Johnson, 1962 – vice chairman of Franklin Resources; donor of $100 million, the second-largest gift in Washington and Lee's history, mostly directed to honors scholarships, but also to other programs including continuing grants
- Julius Kruttschnitt, 1873 – Southern Pacific Railroad executive
- H. F. Lenfest, 1953 – philanthropist and CEO of Lenfest Group; gave the second-largest donation in W&L's history, a $33 million challenge gift requiring a 1:1 match, on March 21, 2007 (as of December 31, 2009, over $20 million of the $33 million goal had been met)
- Sydney Lewis, 1940, Law 1943 – Virginia businessman; art collector; founder of Best Products; recipient with his wife, Frances, of 1987 National Medal of the Arts
- Bill Miller, 1972 – chairman and former chief investment officer of Legg Mason Capital Management; donor of $132 million, the largest gift in Washington and Lee's history, allowing the school to make its applications need-blind
- Warren Stephens, 1979 – businessman; chairman, president, and CEO of Stephens Inc.

== Academia ==
- David Lawrence Anderson – founder and first president of Soochow University, China
- George A. Baxter – president of W&L and Hampden-Sydney College
- J. Bowyer Bell, 1953 – historian, artist and art critic
- John Chavis, 1799 – educator and Presbyterian minister, among the first U.S. college graduates of color
- George H. Denny – professor of Latin and president at Washington and Lee University; president of the University of Alabama
- Charles A. Graves, Law 1872 – professor at W&L Law and at the University of Virginia School of Law
- James N. Hardin Jr. – distinguished professor at the University of South Carolina
- William B. Hesseltine, 1922 – history professor at University of Wisconsin-Madison
- Milton W. Humphreys – alumnus; introduced the Roman pronunciation of Latin at Washington and Lee as a professor; first Professor of Latin and Greek at Vanderbilt University and the University of Texas at Austin; taught at the University of Virginia; president of the American Philological Association, 1882–1883
- Robert Huntley, 1950, Law 1957 – former dean of W&L Law, former president of Washington and Lee University, former president, chairman, and CEO of Best Products
- William Swan Plumer, 1825 – professor at Pittsburgh Theological Seminary (1854–1862); professor of didactic and polemic theology at Columbia Theological Seminary (1867–1875); professor of pastoral, casuistic, and historical theology at Columbia (1875–1880)
- John Thomas Lewis Preston, 1828 – founder of Virginia Military Institute
- Henry L. Roediger III, 1969 – cognitive psychologist and researcher at Washington University in St. Louis
- Kenneth P. Ruscio, 1976 – professor of public policy, president of Washington and Lee University
- Jeffrey L. Seglin, 1978 – writer of weekly column "The Right Thing," faculty member, John F. Kennedy School of Government at Harvard University
- Robert Shepherd, 1959, Law 1961 – professor emeritus of law at the University of Richmond School of Law
- Robert Waymouth, 1982 – professor of chemistry at Stanford University
- Charles M. Williams, 1937 – Harvard Business School professor

== Literature and journalism ==
- Samuel Zenas Ammen – literary editor of The Baltimore Sun; founder of the Kappa Alpha Order
- Terry Brooks, Law 1969 – author of fantasy fiction, 12 million copies in print
- David Brown, Law – former host of the Marketplace radio program
- William Alexander Caruthers – author of novels, including The Kentuckian in New York (1834)
- Kelly Evans, 2007 – journalist; co-host of Worldwide Exchange and Squawk on the Street on the CNBC business news channel
- Alex S. Jones, 1968 – Pulitzer Prize-winning ex-reporter for The New York Times; director of Harvard University's Shorenstein Center for Press, Politics and Public Policy
- Philippe Labro – French author, journalist and film director
- Rebecca Makkai, 1999 – author of novels, including Pulitzer and National Book Award finalist The Great Believers, and short stories
- Roger Mudd, 1950 – congressional correspondent for CBS and PBS; host on the History Channel; member of the Delta Tau Delta fraternity
- Frederick Ramsay, 1958 – medical school academic and administrator; mystery writer
- Mark Richard, 1986 – author and winner of the PEN/Ernest Hemingway Foundation Award
- Tom Robbins – author of Even Cowgirls Get the Blues (did not graduate; attended for two years before moving to New York to become a poet)
- Mark Sappenfield – journalist and editor
- Tom Wolfe, 1951 – writer (creator of New Journalism); author of The Electric Kool Aid Acid Test and The Bonfire of the Vanities, with I Am Charlotte Simmons chronicling college life; former trustee; in 2005, became the only outside speaker in recent times to deliver the undergraduate commencement address

== Science and technology ==
- Jennifer Dowd, 1996 – social scientist and public health researcher
- Joseph L. Goldstein, 1962 – won Nobel Prize for Medicine for research in cholesterol metabolism and discovery that human cells have low-density lipoprotein (LDL) receptors that extract cholesterol from the bloodstream
- William Wilson Morgan, 1924–26 undergraduate classes (graduated from University of Chicago 1927) – astronomer; co-developed the MK system for the classification of stars, and classification systems for galaxies and clusters; Director of Yerkes Observatory

== Art, entertainment, and athletics ==
- Rob Ashford, 1982 – choreographer and director; eight-time Tony Award nominee (winning one), five-time Olivier Award nominee, Emmy Award winner, Drama Desk winner, and Outer Critics Circle Award winner
- Fielder Cook, 1946 – three-time Emmy Award-winning director and producer; director of The Homecoming (TV, 1971), which begat series The Waltons
- Kate Cordsen, 1986 – photographer and contemporary artist; first female graduate of W&L
- Dom Flora, 1958 – basketball standout
- Warren Giles – executive in Baseball Hall of Fame
- Jay Handlan, 1952 – basketball standout who once scored 66 points in a single game
- Mike Henry – writer, comedian, producer, Family Guy
- T. C. Lin – Taiwanese filmmaker, photographer, and writer
- Walt Michaels, 1951 – head coach of NFL's New York Jets, 1977–1982; fullback for Generals, led them to 1951 Gator Bowl against Wyoming
- Meagan Miller, 1996 – opera singer
- Mike Pressler, 1982 – head lacrosse coach at Bryant University; former coach at Duke University who resigned during Duke lacrosse case
- W. Stanley Proctor – sculptor
- Gordon P. Robertson, Law – CEO of the Christian Broadcasting Network
- Cy Twombly, 1953 – abstract artist
- Justin Walker – actor, Christian Stovitz in the 1995 comedy film Clueless

== Religion ==
- Steve Breedlove – Anglican cleric, bishop of the Anglican Diocese of Christ Our Hope in the Anglican Church in North America

== Faculty ==
- John White Brockenbrough – federal judge, founder, and former Dean of the Washington and Lee University School of Law
- Martin P. Burks – former dean of W&L Law and justice on the Virginia Supreme Court
- Judy Clarke – criminal defense attorney for Ted Kaczynski, Zacarias Moussaoui, Eric Rudolph, Susan Smith, Jared Lee Loughner, and Dzhokhar Tsarnaev
- Creigh Deeds (born 1958) – Democratic nominee for governor of Virginia in 2009 and Virginia state senator
- Nora Demleitner (born 1966) – former dean of W&L Law and Hofstra University School of Law
- Edward Southey Joynes – professor of Modern Languages
- Donald W. Lemons – justice on the Supreme Court of Virginia
- James G. Leyburn (1902–1993) – sociologist, former dean
- Lee McLaughlin (1917–1968) – American football player with the Green Bay Packers of the National Football League (NFL) and a head football coach at Washington and Lee University
- Jeffrey P. Minear – counselor to Chief Justice John G. Roberts Jr.
- Clark R. Mollenhoff – journalism professor 1976–1991, former Washington bureau chief Des Moines Register, Pulitzer Prize winner in 1958
- Blake Morant – dean of the George Washington University School of Law
- Fred Perry (1909–1995) – tennis champion; won 8 Grand Slams and coached the W&L tennis team
- Marvin Banks Perry Jr. (1918–1994) – president of Goucher College and Agnes Scott College
- Rodney A. Smolla – dean of Widener University School of Law; former dean of W&L Law; First Amendment scholar; former president of Furman University
- Waller Redd Staples – member of the Confederate House of Representatives; justice on the Virginia Supreme Court
- Barry Sullivan – former dean of W&L Law; professor at Loyola University Chicago School of Law
- John Randolph Tucker – Virginia attorney general, former dean, and former president of the American Bar Association

== Trustees and benefactors ==
- Cyrus McCormick – inventor of the mechanical reaper; founder of the McCormick Harvesting Machine Company, which became part of International Harvester Company
- George Washington – first president of the United States, general of the Continental Army

== Presidents ==
See List of presidents of Washington and Lee University.
