= List of Washington and Lee University School of Law alumni =

Washington and Lee University School of Law is a private law school in Lexington, Virginia. Following are some of its notable alumni.

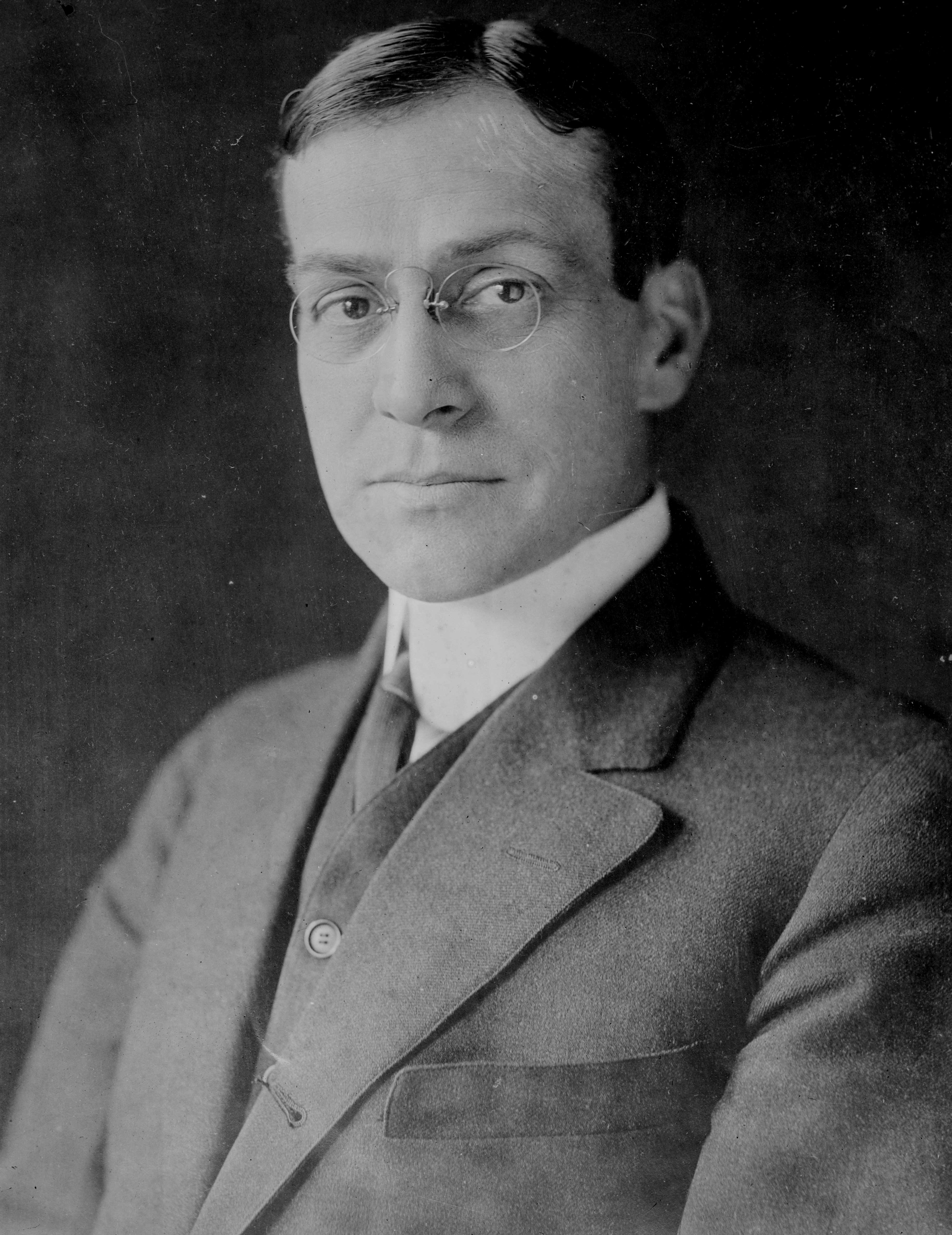
Newton D. Baker, Class of 1894, United States secretary of war

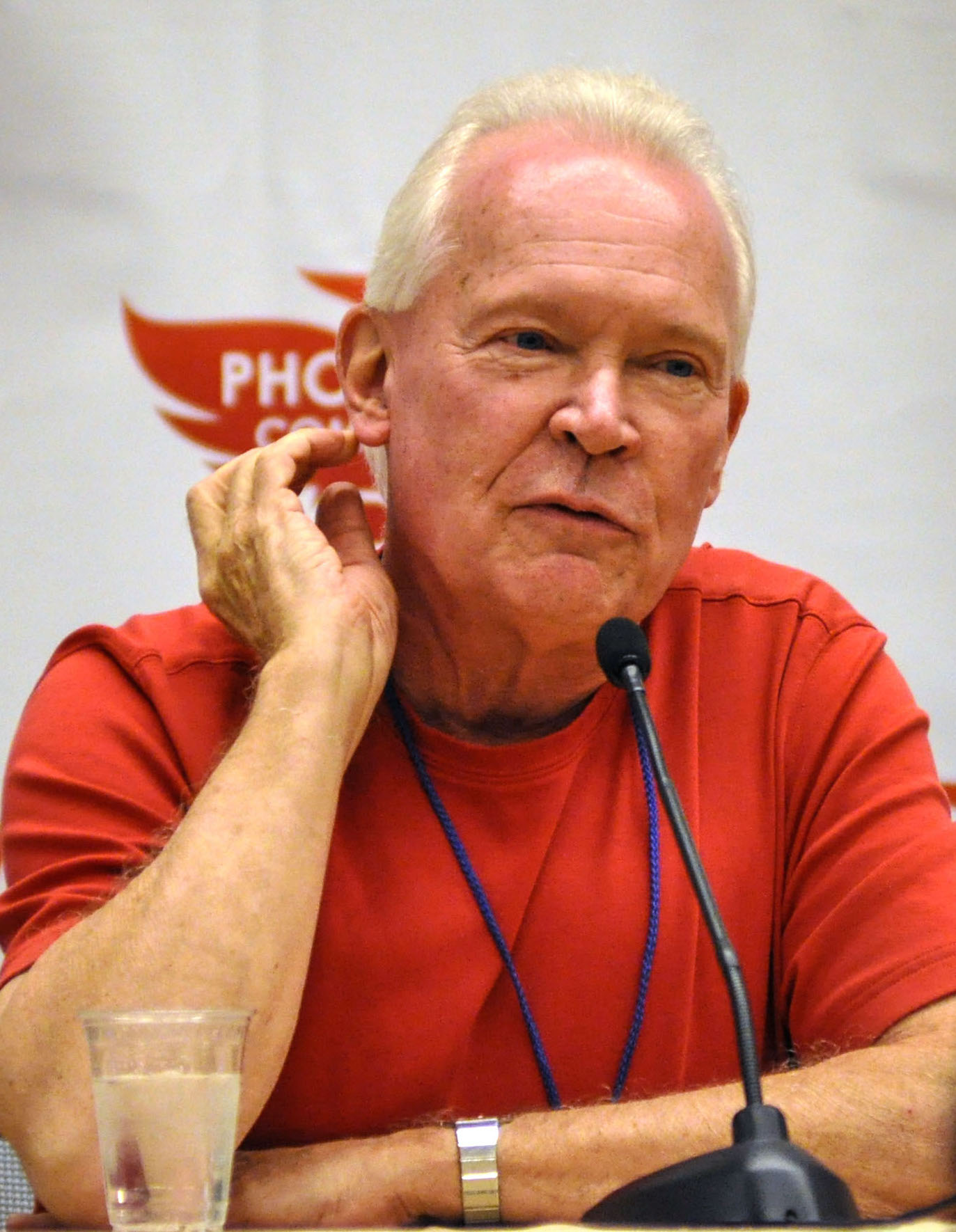
Terry Brooks, Class of 1969, New York Times best selling author

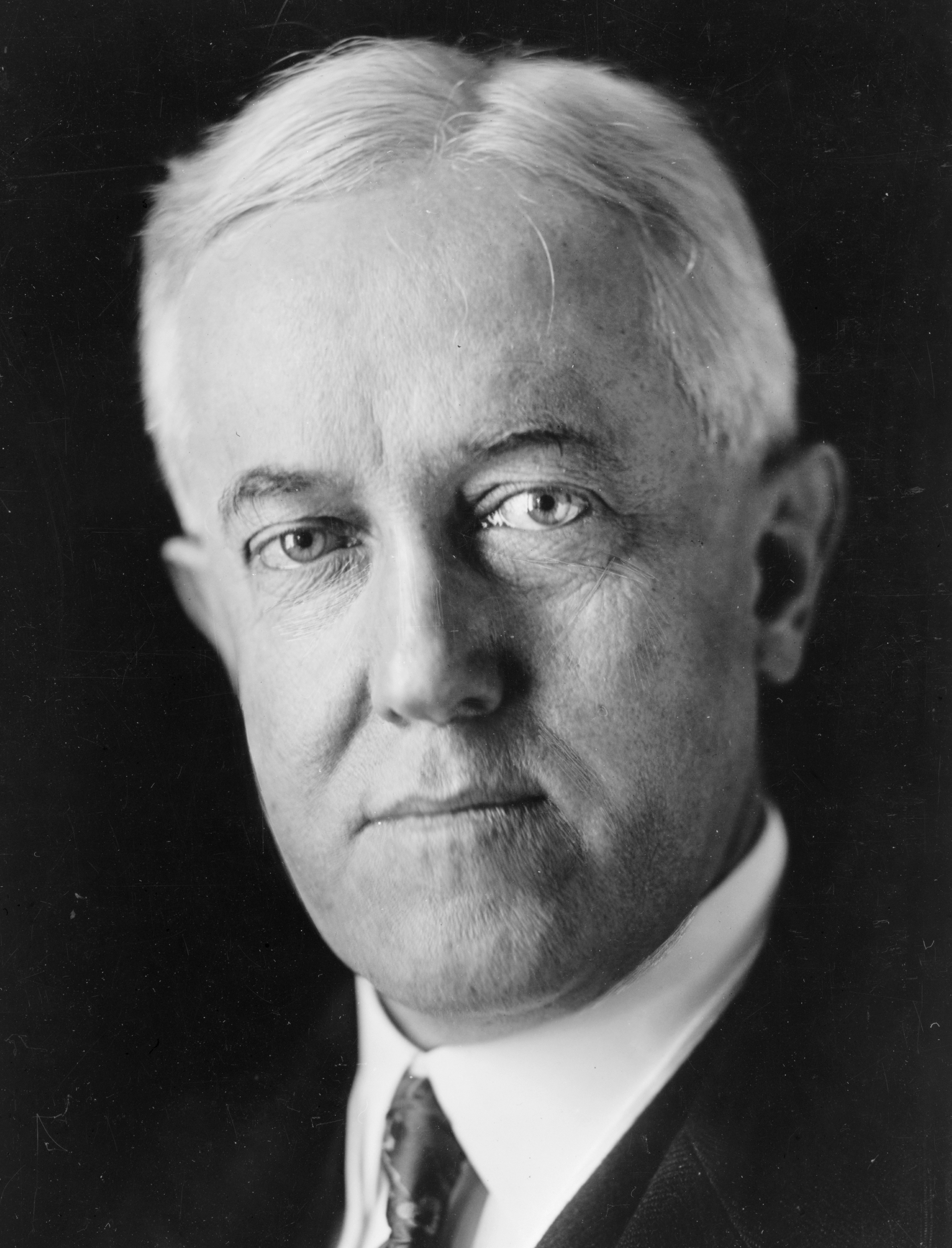
John W. Davis, Class of 1892, United States solicitor general

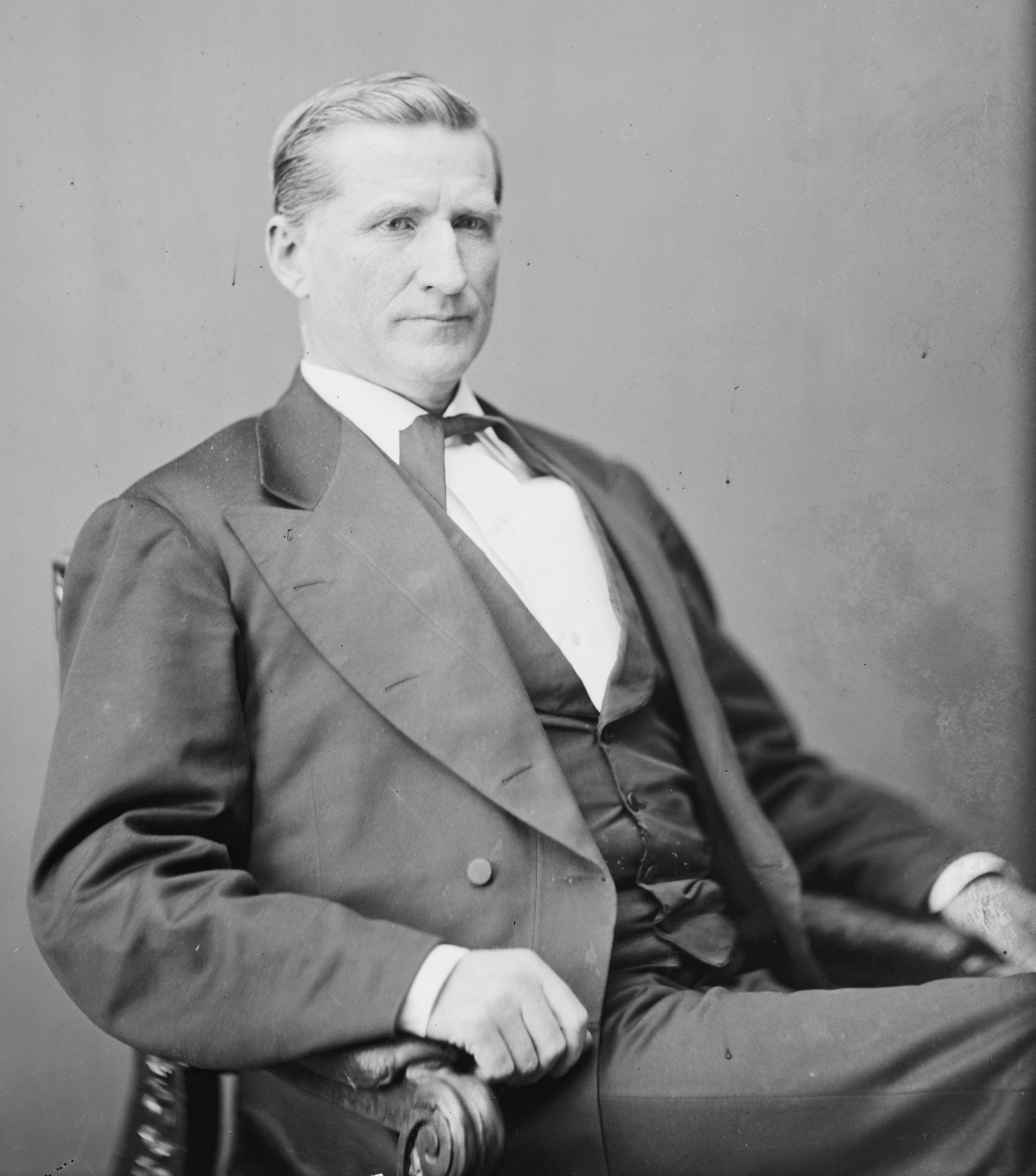
John Goode, class of ~1851, United States solicitor general

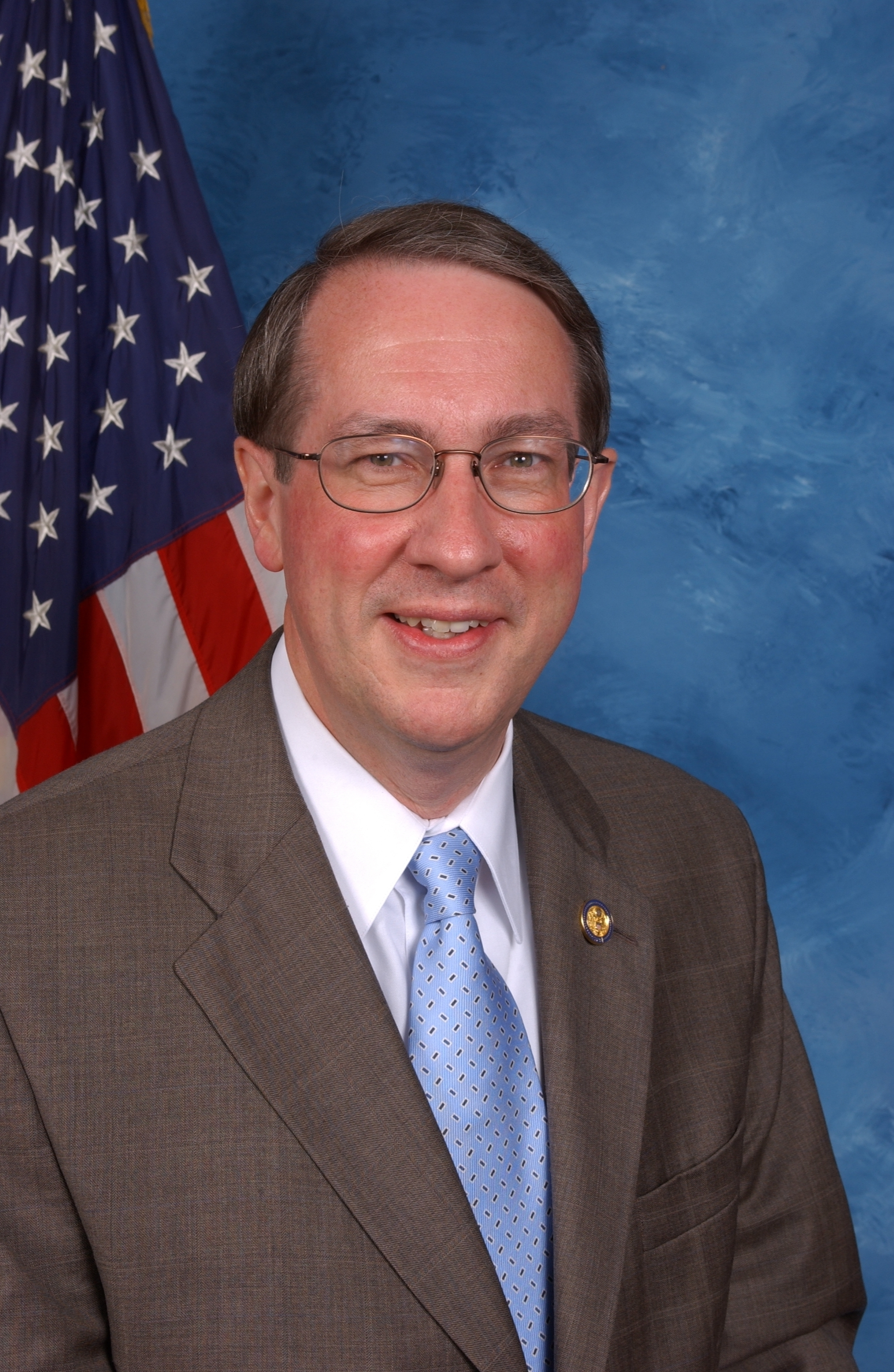
Bob Goodlatte, Class of 1977, former chair of the United States House Committee on the Judiciary

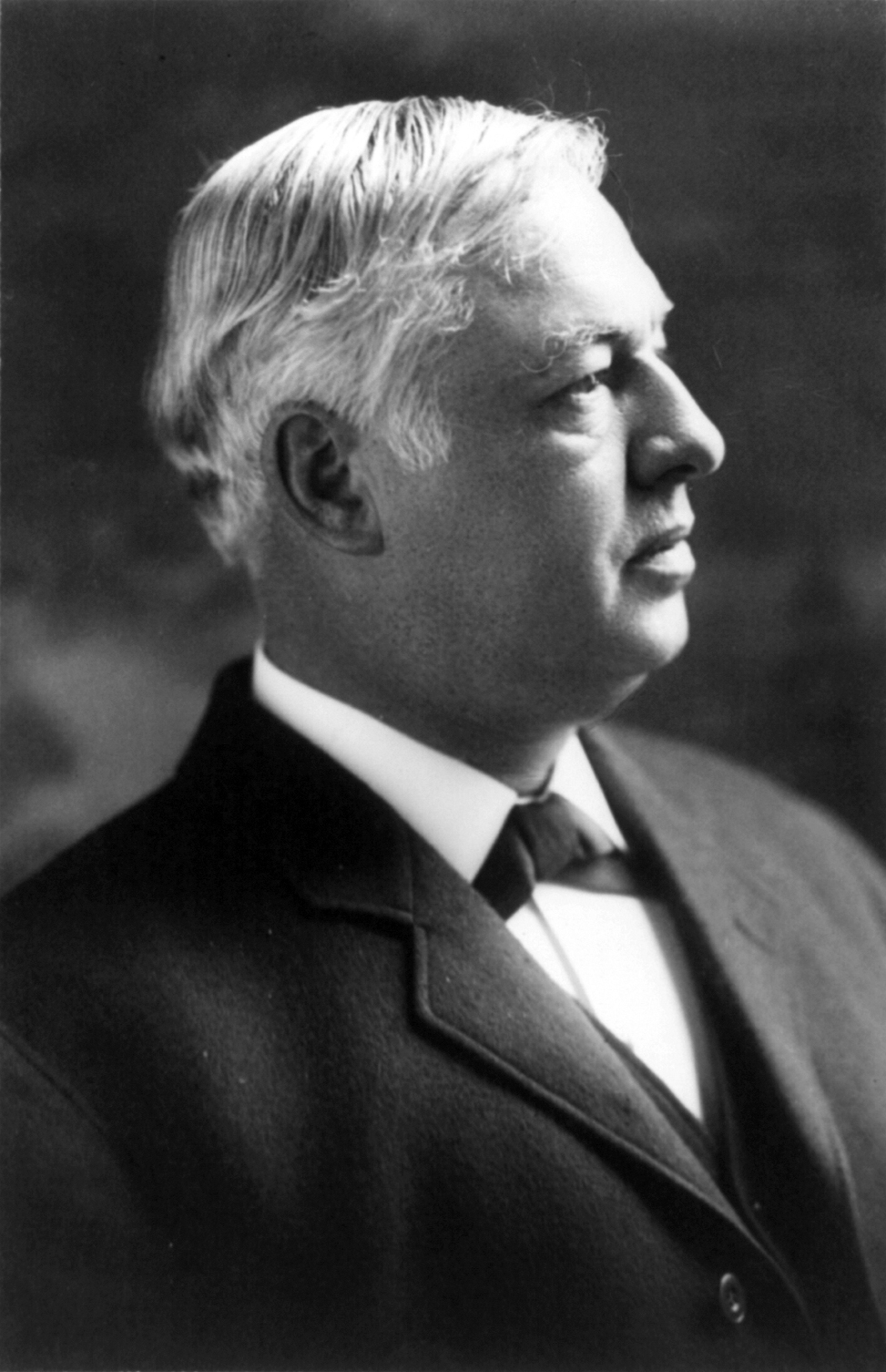
Joseph Rucker Lamar, Class of 1878 (did not graduate), associate justice of the United States Supreme Court

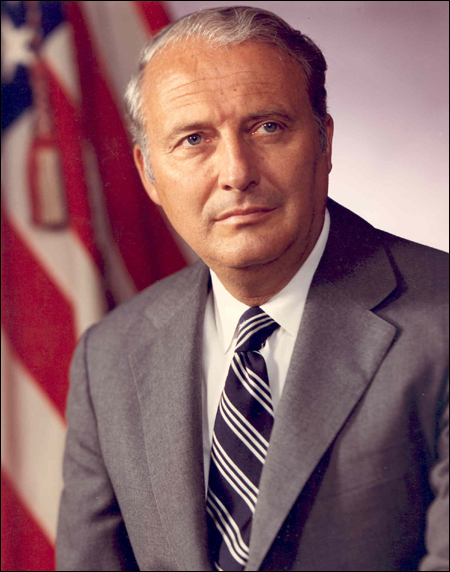
John Otho Marsh Jr., Class of 1951, U.S. secretary of the Army

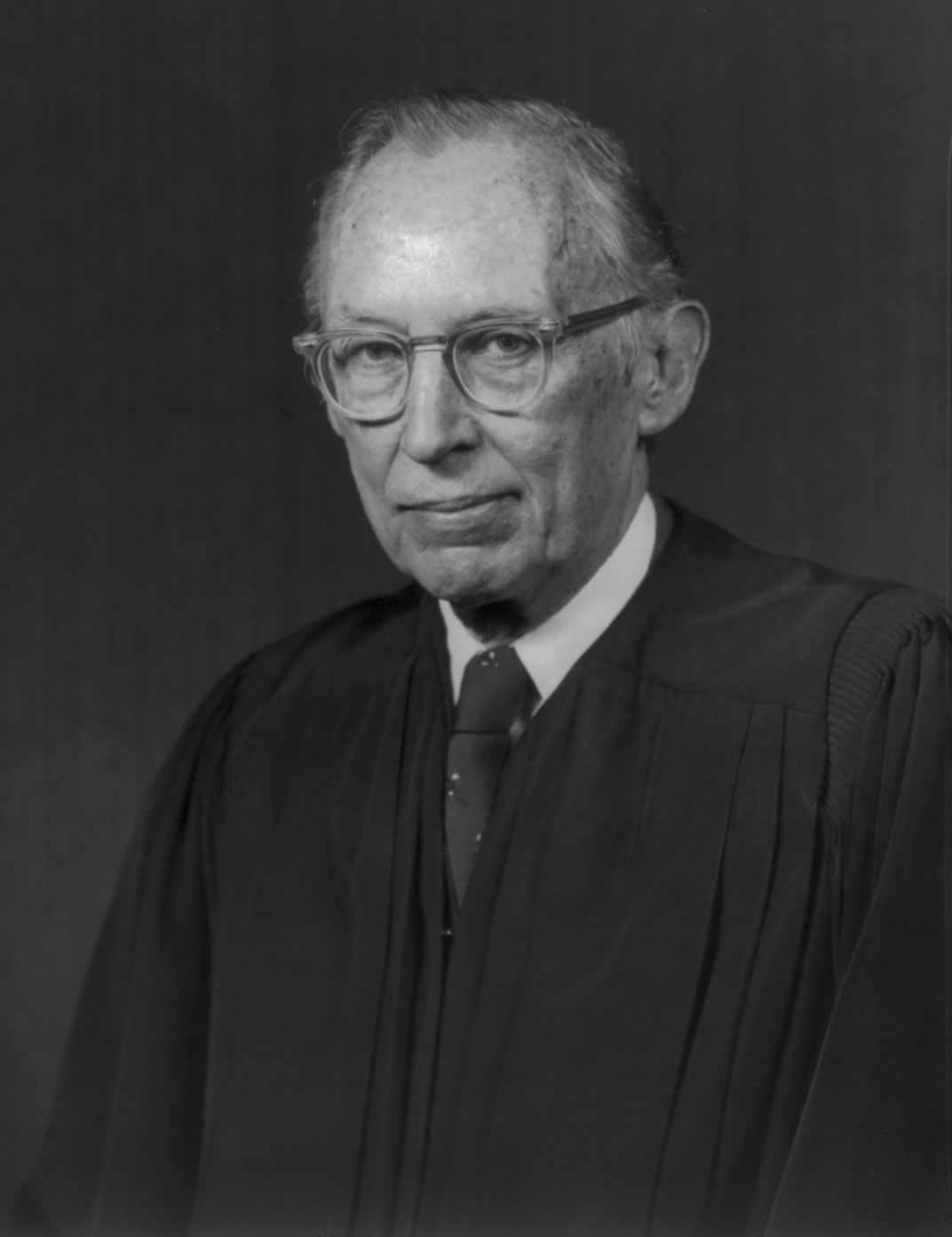
Lewis F. Powell Jr., Class of 1931, associate justice of the United States Supreme Court

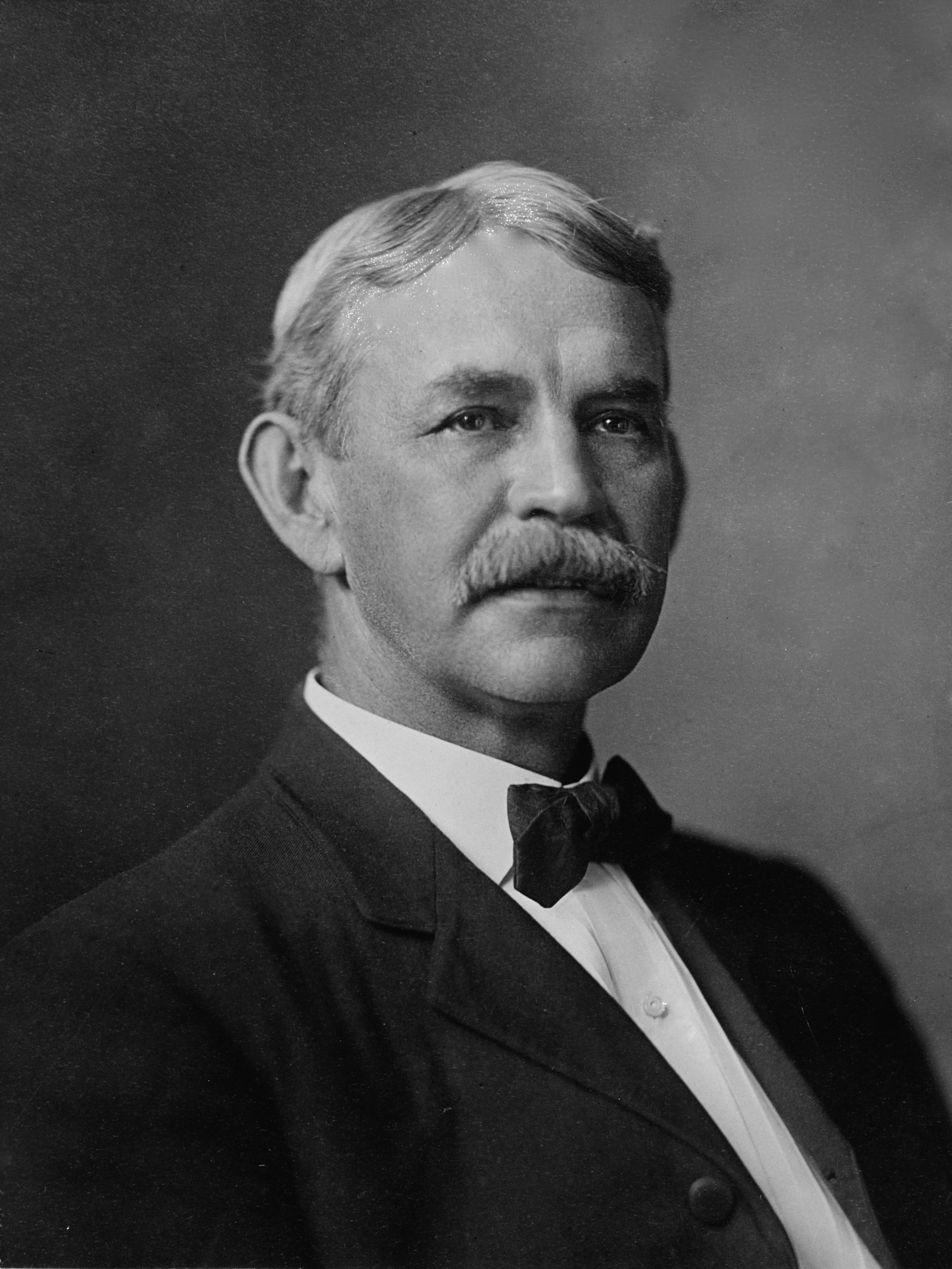
Henry St. George Tucker III, Class of 1879, United States representative from Virginia

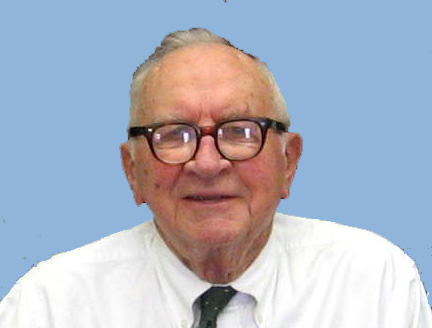
H. Emory Widener Jr., Class of 1953, former senior judge on the United States Court of Appeals for the Fourth Circuit

== Academia ==
- Ronald J. Bacigal, 1967, professor at the University of Richmond School of Law
- Charles A. Graves, 1872, professor at Washington and Lee School of Law and at the University of Virginia School of Law
- Robert Huntley, 1950 and 1957, dean and president of Washington and Lee University and former president and CEO of Best Products
- Robert Shepherd, 1959 and 1961, professor emeritus of law at the University of Richmond School of Law
- Paul S. Trible Jr., 1971, president of Christopher Newport University and United States Senate
- Henry St. George Tucker III, 1876, dean of Washington and Lee School of Law and the George Washington University Law School, and U.S. representative from Virginia

== Business ==
- Robert Huntley, 1957, president and CEO of Best Products and dean and president of Washington and Lee University
- Sydney Lewis, 1943 (finished his J.D. degree at George Washington University), founder of Best Products and recipient of the National Medal of Arts
- Gordon P. Robertson, CEO of the Christian Broadcasting Network

== Entertainment ==
- David Brown, 2000, former host of the Marketplace radio program, current anchor of the Texas Standard

== Government ==
- Mary Beth Long, 1998, assistant secretary of Defense for International Security Affairs at the United States Department of Defense

== Judiciary ==
=== U.S. Supreme Court ===
- Joseph Rucker Lamar, 1878 (attended, did not graduate) associate justice of the Supreme Court of the United States and justice of the Supreme Court of Georgia
- Lewis Franklin Powell Jr., 1931, associate justice of the United States Supreme Court

=== Federal courts ===
- Nathan P. Bryan, 1895, judge on the United States Court of Appeals for the Fifth Circuit and US Senator from the State of Florida
- Mark Steven Davis, 1988, United States District Court judge for the Eastern District of Virginia
- Duncan Lawrence Groner, 1894, judge for United States District Court for the Eastern District of Virginia, chief judge of the United States Court of Appeals for the D.C. Circuit
- James Hay, 1877, judge on the United States Court of Claims and United States representative from Virginia
- Jerrauld Jones, 1980, judge on the Norfolk Circuit Court
- Walter DeKalb Kelley Jr., 1977 and 1981, former federal judge in the Eastern District of Virginia
- Jackson L. Kiser, 1952, judge on the United States District Court for the Western District of Virginia
- Harry Jacob Lemley, 1910, judge of the United States District Court for the Eastern District of Arkansas and the United States District Court for the Western District of Arkansas
- John Ashton MacKenzie, 1939, judge for the United States District Court for the Eastern District of Virginia
- Robert E. Payne, 1967, judge for the United States District Court for the Eastern District of Virginia
- Heartsill Ragon, judge on the United States District Court for the Western District of Arkansas and US congressman from Arkansas
- James Clinton Turk, 1952, chief judge of the United States District Court for the Western District of Virginia
- Sol Wachtler, chief judge of the New York Court of Appeals
- H. Emory Widener Jr., 1953, former judge for the United States Court of Appeals for the Fourth Circuit

=== State supreme courts ===
- Brynja McDivitt Booth, 1996, justice of the Supreme Court of Maryland
- William T. Brotherton Jr., chief justice of the Supreme Court of West Virginia
- Archibald C. Buchanan, 1914, justice on the Supreme Court of Virginia
- Christian Compton, 1950 and 1953, justice of the Supreme Court of Virginia
- John W. Eggleston, 1910, chief justice of the Supreme Court of Virginia
- Herbert B. Gregory, 1911, justice on the Supreme Court of Virginia
- Daniel B. Lucas, poet and justice on the Supreme Court of West Virginia
- Charles W. Mason, 1911, justice of the Oklahoma Supreme Court
- William Ray Price Jr., 1978, chief justice of the Supreme Court of Missouri
- Daniel K. Sadler, justice on the New Mexico Supreme Court
- Abram Penn Staples, 1908, justice on the Supreme Court of Virginia and attorney general of Virginia
- Roscoe B. Stephenson Jr., 1943 and 1947, justice on the Supreme Court of Virginia
- Kennon C. Whittle, 1914, justice on the Supreme Court of Virginia

== Law ==
=== Attorney general ===
- Bruce Castor, 1986, attorney general (interim), solicitor general of Pennsylvania, and presidential impeachment counsel 2021
- Tom Sansonetti, 1976, United States assistant attorney general for the United States Department of Justice Environment and Natural Resources Division
- Abram Penn Staples, 1908, attorney general of Virginia and justice on the Supreme Court of Virginia

=== Solicitor general ===
- Bruce L. Castor Jr., 1986, solicitor general of Pennsylvania, attorney general (interim), presidential impeachment counsel 2021
- John Goode, ~1851, solicitor general of the United States and United States congressman from Virginia
- John W. Davis, 1895 and 1892, solicitor general; ambassador to Britain; argued more cases before the Supreme Court than anyone else in the twentieth century

=== Government ===
- John P. Fishwick Jr., former United States attorney for the Western District of Virginia. attorney in private practice in Roanoke, Virginia
- R. Booth Goodwin, 1996, United States attorney for the Southern District of West Virginia
- Robert W. Ray, 1985, former head of the US Office of the Independent Counsel and partner at Fox Rothschild
- Peter G. Strasser, United States attorney for the Eastern District of Louisiana

=== Private practice ===
- Robert J. Grey Jr., 1976, American Bar Association president 2004–2005
- Linda A. Klein, 1983, past president of the American Bar Association and a managing partner for the Georgia offices of Baker, Donelson, Bearman, Caldwell & Berkowitz
- Morgan Meyer, 1999, lawyer for Bracewell & Giuliani in Dallas, Texas, and U.S. representative
- Prescott Prince, 1983, attorney defending Khalid Sheikh Mohammed

== Literature and journalism ==
- Terry Brooks, 1969, New York Times bestselling author of fantasy fiction
- Clarence J. Brown, 1915, president of Brown Publishing Company and United States Congressman from Ohio
- Daniel B. Lucas, poet and justice on the Supreme Court of West Virginia

== Military ==
- Newton D. Baker, 1894, U.S. secretary of war and mayor of Cleveland, Ohio
- Edwin Gray Lee, 1859, brigadier general in the Confederate States of America
- John Otho Marsh Jr., 1951, secretary of the Army and United States congressman

== Politics ==
=== United States Senate ===
- Nathan P. Bryan, 1895, U.S. senator from Florida and judge on the United States Court of Appeals for the Fifth Circuit
- William James Bryan, 1899, U.S. senator from Florida
- Joe Donnelly, 1981, U.S. senator from Indiana
- Scott Marion Loftin, 1899, U.S. senator from Florida
- Miles Poindexter, 1891, U.S. senator from Washington
- Alfred E. Reames, 1893, U.S. senator from Oregon
- Paul S. Trible Jr., 1971, U.S. senator from Virginia and president of Christopher Newport University

=== United States Congress ===
- Samuel B. Avis, U.S. representative
- Franklin Brockson, U.S. representative
- Clarence J. Brown, 1915, U.S. representative and president of Brown Publishing Company
- Edward Cooper, U.S. representative
- William Fadjo Cravens, U.S. representative
- John J. Davis, 1856, U.S. representative
- John Goode, U.S. representative and solicitor general of the United States
- Bob Goodlatte, 1977, U.S. representative
- Morgan Griffith, 1983, U.S. representative
- James Hay, 1877, U.S. representative and judge on the United States Court of Claims
- James Murray Hooker, 1896, U.S. representative
- John Otho Marsh Jr., 1951, U.S. representative and U.S. secretary of the Army
- Robert Murphy Mayo, 1859, U.S. representative
- Heartsill Ragon, U.S. representative and judge on the United States District Court for the Western District of Arkansas
- Henry St. George Tucker III, 1876, U.S. representative; dean of Washington and Lee School of Law and the George Washington University Law School
- David Gardiner Tyler, 1869, U.S. representative
- Seward H. Williams, 1895, U.S. representative
- Harry M. Wurzbach, 1896, U.S. representative

=== Diplomacy ===
- John W. Davis, 1895 and 1892, ambassador to Britain and U.S. solicitor general; argued more cases before the U. S. Supreme Court than anyone else in the twentieth century

=== Governor ===
- Spencer Cox, 2001, governor of Utah
- George Washington Hays, governor of Arkansas
- Homer A. Holt, 1918 and 1923, governor of West Virginia
- James L. Kemper, 1842, governor of Virginia
- Ruby Laffoon, 1890, governor of Kentucky
- Henry M. Mathews, 1857, governor of West Virginia
- Thomas Chipman McRae, governor of Arkansas and U.S. representative
- Charles L. Terry Jr., governor of Delaware
- William M. Tuck, 1921, governor of Virginia
- Junius Edgar West, 22nd lieutenant governor of Virginia

=== State ===
- William Ross Allen, Virginia House of Delegates
- Robert D. Bailey Jr., West Virginia secretary of state
- Morgan Meyer, 1999, member of Texas House of Representatives and lawyer with Bracewell & Giuliani in Dallas, Texas
- Mark Obenshain, 1987, Senate of Virginia
- Mark J. Peake, 1988, Senate of Virginia
- Lacey E. Putney, Virginia House of Delegates
- Susan Swecker, chair of the Democratic Party of Virginia

=== Local ===
- Newton D. Baker, 1894, mayor of Cleveland, Ohio and U.S. secretary of war
- Vance A. Funk III, 1968, mayor of Newark, Delaware

== Sports ==
- Gay Elmore, Southern Conference Men's Basketball Player of the Year
