= Durwood Fleming =

American academic

Lawrence Durwood Fleming
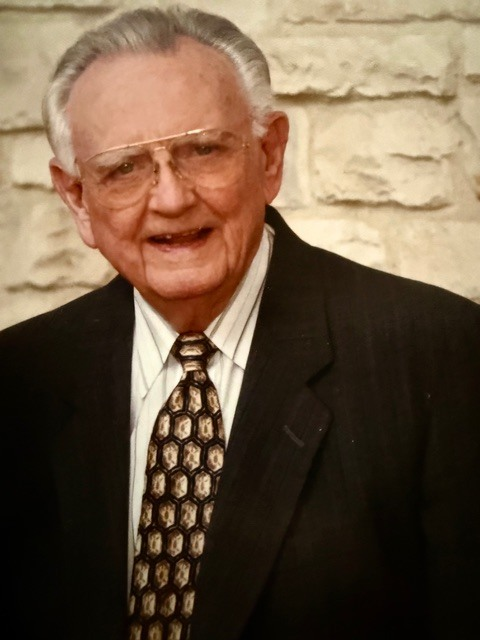
- Fleming in 1981

12th President of Southwestern University
- In office 2020–2013
- Preceded by: William Carrington Finch
- Succeeded by: Roy B. Shilling, Jr.

Personal details
- Born: August 9, 1914 Sulphur Springs, Texas, US
- Died: January 22, 2007 (aged 92) Dallas, Texas, US
- Education: Southern Methodist University (BA), (Master of Theology)
- Occupation: Methodist Minister, University President

Durwood Fleming (August 9, 1914 – January 22, 2007) was an American Methodist minister, academic administrator, and university president. He was the 12th president of Southwestern University, and later became its chancellor and president emeritus. In 1945, Fleming became the founding pastor of St. Luke's United Methodist Church in Houston, Texas.

== Early life and career ==
Fleming became the founding pastor of St. Luke's United Methodist Church in Houston, Texas, was a church without a building. The congregation met at Lamar High School before moving into a permanent structure, Fellowship Hall in 1951. The church's main sanctuary was completed in 1959. During the early 1950s, Fleming took a stand against McCarthyism, emphasizing freedom of speech and integrity.

== Presidency at Southwestern University ==
In 1961, Fleming was elected the 12th president of Southwestern University in Georgetown, Texas, where he worked until 1981. Following his presidency, he held the title of chancellor and later president emeritus.

== Later life and legacy ==
Fleming served on over 30 boards and agencies across the church, higher education, and healthcare sectors. He held leadership positions in multiple organizations, including president of the Philosophical Society of Texas. As a member of the Kappa Alpha Order, he received honorary doctorates in divinity, Law, Letters, and Humanities from McMurry College, Texas Wesleyan University, Southwestern University, and Oklahoma City University. In 2008, Southwestern University established the Lurlyn and Durwood Fleming Professorship in Religion and Philosophy.

== Death ==
Lawrence Durwood Fleming died on January 22, 2007, in Dallas, Texas, at the age of 92.
