= George Dod Armstrong =

Presbyterian minister

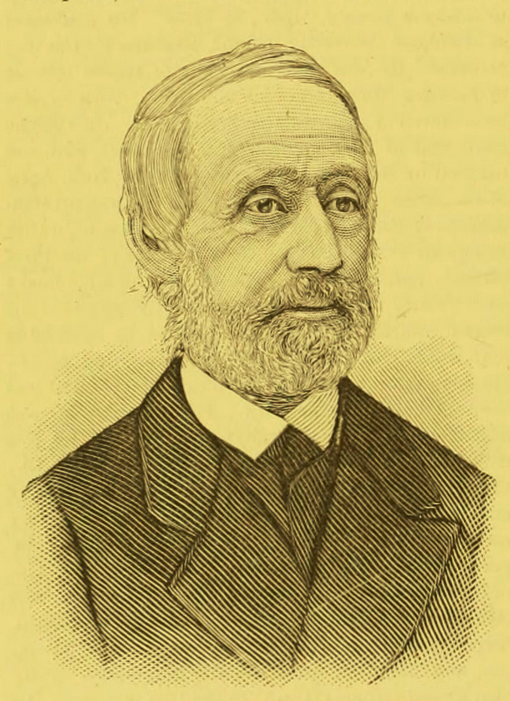
George Dod Armstrong

George Dod Armstrong (September 15, 1813 – May 11, 1899) was a Presbyterian minister and author born in Mendham, New Jersey. He was one of ten children by Amzi Armstrong, a Presbyterian pastor, and Polly Dod.

George Armstrong graduated from Princeton University in 1832 and then taught school until he entered Union Theological Seminary, Virginia. He became a professor of chemistry and mechanics in 1838 at Washington College in Lexington, Virginia now Washington and Lee University. He taught there with Henry Ruffner and George Dabney. He held this position for thirteen years when he left to become pastor of the First Presbyterian Church in Norfolk, Virginia. He remained here until his death in 1899.

George Armstrong served as a chaplain in the Confederate States Army.

In 1855 his family was nearly destroyed by Yellow Fever losing 3 children and his wife. In 1856 he authored a personal account of the epidemic: The Summer of the Pestilence.

== Support of slavery ==
Armstrong was one of many American ministers and prominent Christians who vocally supported the institution of slavery and rejected abolitionism in the years prior to the Civil War. In his publication The Christian Doctrine of Slavery, Armstrong lays out his defense of the institution of slavery based on his reading of the Bible.

== Works ==
- Politics and the Pulpit 1856
- The Christian Doctrine of Slavery 1857 Full Text available at Internet Archive
- Doctrine of Baptism 1857
- The Theology of Christian Experience 1858
- "The Good Hand of Our God Upon Us," a Thanksgiving Sermon Preached on the Occasion of the Victory of Manassas 1861
- The Sacraments of the New Testament as Instituted by Christ 1880
- The Two Books of Nature and Revelation Collated 1886
