= Henry Coke Morgan Jr. =

American judge (1935–2022)

Senior Judge of the United States District Court for the Eastern District of Virginia
- In office February 8, 2004 – May 1, 2022

Judge of the United States District Court for the Eastern District of Virginia
- In office April 13, 1992 – February 8, 2004
- Appointed by: George H. W. Bush
- Preceded by: Seat established by 104 Stat. 5089
- Succeeded by: Walter D. Kelley Jr.

Personal details
- Born: February 8, 1935 Norfolk, Virginia, U.S.
- Died: May 1, 2022 (aged 87) Virginia Beach, Virginia, U.S.
- Education: Washington and Lee University (BS, JD)

Henry Coke Morgan Jr. (February 8, 1935 – May 1, 2022) was a United States district judge of the United States District Court for the Eastern District of Virginia.

== Education and career ==
Born in Norfolk, Virginia, Morgan received a Bachelor of Science degree from Washington and Lee University in 1957 and a Juris Doctor from Washington and Lee University School of Law in 1960. He was a Reserve Lieutenant in the United States Army from 1958 to 1959. He was an assistant city attorney of Norfolk from 1960 to 1963, and was then in private practice in Virginia Beach, Virginia from 1963 to 1992.

== Federal judicial service ==
On October 22, 1991, Morgan was nominated by President George H. W. Bush to a new seat on the United States District Court for the Eastern District of Virginia created by 104 Stat. 5089. He was confirmed by the United States Senate on April 8, 1992, and received his commission on April 13, 1992. He assumed senior status on February 8, 2004. His judicial service ended with his death on May 1, 2022.

== Sources ==
Legal offices
Preceded by Seat established by 104 Stat. 5089	Judge of the United States District Court for the Eastern District of Virginia; 1992–2004	Succeeded by Walter D. Kelley Jr.
