= William Lyne Wilson =

American politician and lawyer (1843–1900)

William Wilson
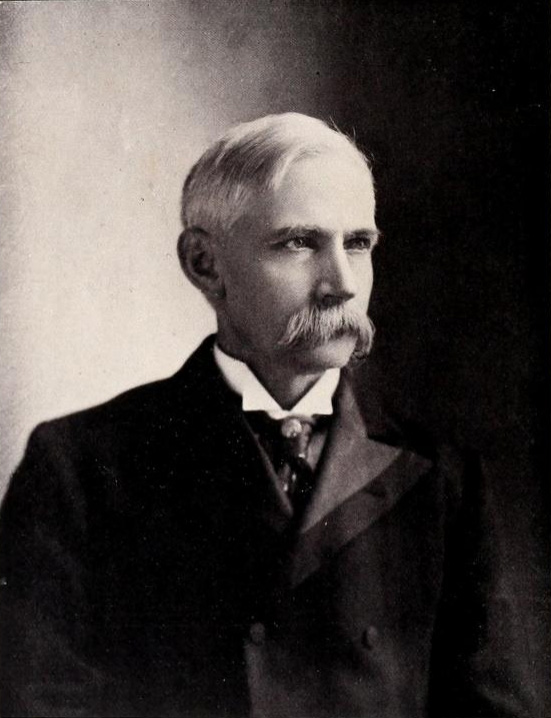

37th United States Postmaster General
- In office March 1, 1895 – March 5, 1897
- President: Grover Cleveland; William McKinley
- Preceded by: Wilson S. Bissell
- Succeeded by: James Gary

Member of the U.S. House of Representatives from West Virginia's 2nd district
- In office March 4, 1883 – March 3, 1895
- Preceded by: John B. Hoge
- Succeeded by: Alston G. Dayton

Personal details
- Born: William Lyne Wilson; May 3, 1843 Charles Town, Virginia, U.S. (now West Virginia)
- Died: October 17, 1900 (aged 57) Lexington, Virginia, U.S.
- Party: Democratic
- Education: George Washington University (BA); University of Virginia

Military service
- Allegiance: Confederate States
- Branch/service: Confederate States Army
- Rank: Private
- Unit: 12th Virginia Cavalry
- Battles/wars: American Civil War

William Lyne Wilson (May 3, 1843 – October 17, 1900) was an American politician and lawyer from West Virginia. A Bourbon Democrat, he was elected to the United States Congress in 1882 and served six terms of office, ending in 1895.

Following his departure from the House of Representatives, he was appointed Postmaster General of the United States by President Grover Cleveland, and remained in that cabinet-level position until 1897. After leaving government service, he was named President of Washington and Lee University in Lexington, Virginia.

== Biography ==
=== Early years and marriage ===
William Lyne Wilson was born in Charles Town, Virginia (now West Virginia) on May 3, 1843. He attended Charles Town Academy, graduated from Columbian College, today part of George Washington University, from which he graduated in 1860. He subsequently studied at the University of Virginia.

During the Civil War, he enlisted in the Confederate Army and served as a private in the 12th Virginia Cavalry.

After the war, Wilson for several years, he taught school at Columbian College during which he graduated from law school. He was admitted to the bar in 1869 and opened a private practice in Charles Town.

He was chosen as president of West Virginia University, taking office on September 4, 1882.

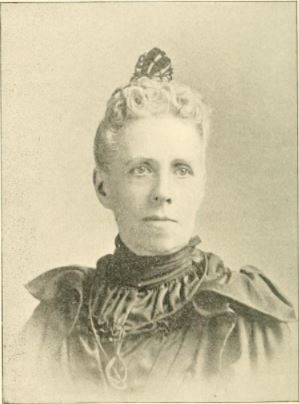
Mrs William Lyne Wilson

He married the daughter of Rev. A.J. Huntington, D.D., professor of Greek in Columbian University.

=== Political career ===
Wilson was a delegate to the Democratic National Convention in 1880. He was elected a Democrat to the United States House of Representatives shortly afterward and won reelection five times afterwards, serving from 1883 to 1895. He served as chairman of the Committee on Ways and Means from 1893 to 1895 during which he co-authored the Wilson–Gorman Tariff Act which slightly reduced the United States tariff rates from the numbers set by the McKinley Tariff of 1890.

After leaving Congress, Wilson was appointed Postmaster General in the cabinet of President Grover Cleveland and served from 1895 to 1897. During that time, future Secretary of War Newton D. Baker served as his private secretary. In 1896, he broke party lines by opposing the Free Silver Movement led by Democratic presidential nominee William Jennings Bryan and, like many Bourbon Democrats, backed the National Democratic candidate John McAuley Palmer who supported the traditional gold standard, limited government and opposed protectionism.

=== Death and legacy ===
After leaving office as Postmaster General, Wilson served as president of Washington and Lee University. Wilson died in Lexington, Virginia, on October 17, 1900, and was interred in Edgehill Cemetery in Charles Town.

A portion of U.S. Route 340 between Harpers Ferry and Charles Town, West Virginia, is designated the William L. Wilson Freeway in his honor.

== Works ==
- Pensions Appropriation Bill: Speech of Hon. William L. Wilson, of West Virginia, in the House of Representatives, Tuesday, March 2, 1886. Washington, DC: U.S. Government Printing Office, 1886.
- The Tariff: Speech of Hon. William L. Wilson, of West Virginia, in the House of Representatives, Thursday, May 3, 1888. Washington, DC: U.S. Government Printing Office, 1888.
- The National Democratic Party: Its History, Principles, Achievements, and Aims. (Editor.) Baltimore, MD: H.L. Harvey and Co., 1888.
- The New Trial of Popular Government: An Address Delivered before the Society of the Alumni of the University of Virginia, on Commencement Day, June 1, 1891. Charlottesville, VA, C.M. Brand, 1891.
- Duties on Wool and Woolen Goods: Speech of Hon. William L. Wilson, of West Virginia, in the House of Representatives, Thursday, April 7, 1892. Washington, DC: U.S. Government Printing Office, 1892.
- "The Man, or The Platform?" (Symposium contributor.) North American Review, vol. 154, whole no. 426 (May 1892), pp. 525–529.
- "The Tariff Plank at Chicago," North American Review, vol. 155 (Sept. 1892), pp. 280–286.
- "The Income Tax on Corporations," North American Review, vol. 158, whole no. 446 (Jan. 1894), pp. 1–7.
- The Tariff: Speech of Hon. William L. Wilson, of West Virginia, in the House of Representatives, Monday and Tuesday, January 8 and 9, 1894. Washington, DC: Capital Publishing Co., 1894.
- Tariff Reform: Speeches of Hon. Charles F. Crisp, of Georgia, and Hon. William L. Wilson, of West Virginia, in the House of Representatives, Thursday, February 1, 1894. With Charles F. Crisp. Washington, DC: Hartman and Cadick, 1894.
- Speech of Hon. William L. Wilson Before the Young Men's Democratic Association at Philadelphia, Pa., January 8th,1895: "Moderate and Just Taxation is the Best Achievement of Legislative Action." Boston, MA: New England Free Trade League, 1895.
- The Inauguration of William Lyne Wilson, LL. D. as President of Washington and Lee University, Lexington, Va., September 15, 1897. Lynchburg, VA: J.P. Bell Co., 1897.
- "The Founders of States and the Founders of Colleges," University Record, vol. 3, no. 15 (July 8, 1898), pp. 85–90.
- The Cabinet Diary of William L. Wilson, 1896-1897. Chapel Hill, NC: University of North Carolina Press, 1957.
- A Borderland Confederate. Festus P. Summers (ed.) Pittsburgh, PA: University of Pittsburgh Press, 1962.

== See also ==
- List of presidents of West Virginia University

U.S. House of Representatives
Preceded by John B. Hoge	Member of the U.S. House of Representatives from West Virginia's 2nd congressional district 1883–1885	Succeeded by Alston G. Dayton
Preceded by William Springer	Chair of the House Ways and Means Committee; 1893–1895	Succeeded by Nelson Dingley Jr.
Political offices
Preceded by Wilson S. Bissell	United States Postmaster General; 1895–1897	Succeeded by James Gary
Academic offices
Preceded by Custis Lee	President of Washington and Lee University; 1897–1900	Succeeded by Henry Tucker
