= John Temple Graves =

American newspaper editor (1856–1925)

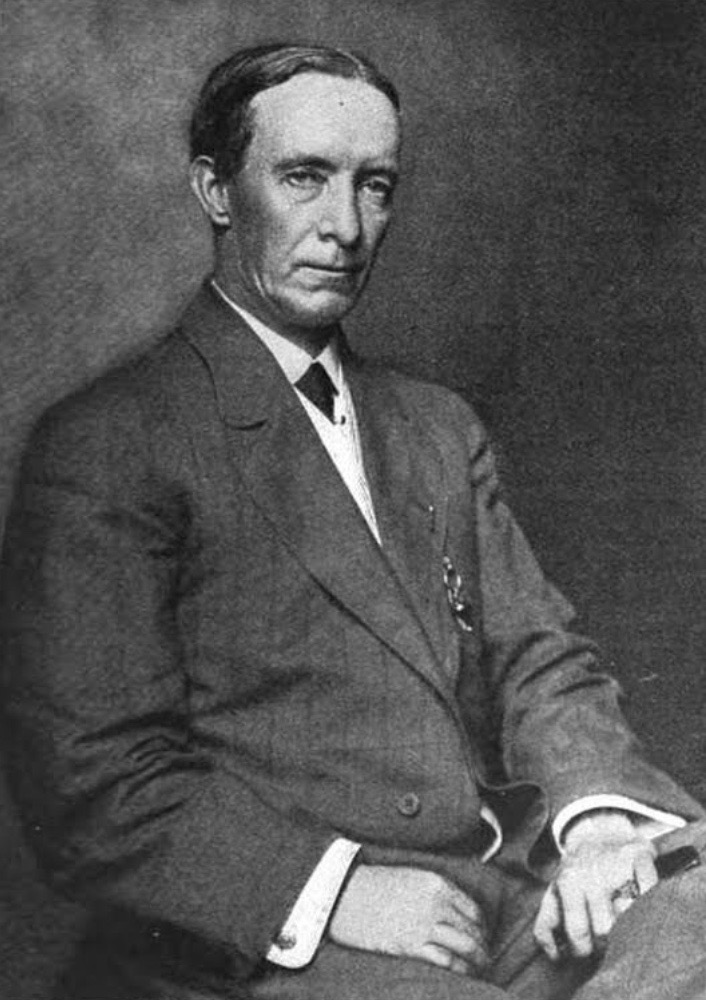

Personal details
- Born: November 9, 1856 Willington, South Carolina, United States
- Died: August 8, 1925 (aged 68) Washington, D.C., United States
- Party: Democratic (before 1908; 1912–1925); Independence (1908–1912)
- Spouse(s): Mattie Simpson (1878–?); Anne Cothran (1890–1925)
- Children: 5

John Temple Graves (November 9, 1856 – August 8, 1925) was an American newspaper editor who is best known for being the vice presidential nominee of the Independence Party in the presidential election of 1908.

== Biography ==
Graves was born in 1856 in Willington, South Carolina, to General James Porterfield Graves (1820–1914) and Katherine Floride Townes (1827–1858). He was related to the Calhoun family, a prominent family in 18th and 19th-century American politics, and was the great-grandnephew of John C. Calhoun, who served as Vice President of the United States from 1825 until 1832. Graves joined the Kappa Alpha Order in 1871 and achieved the rank of Knight Commander, KA's highest national post, a decade later. In 1907, the order would hold a banquet in his honor.

He served as a presidential elector for Florida in 1884 and for Georgia in 1888. He was an Atlantan.

In a speech in Chautauqua, New York, he denounced allowing African-Americans to vote: "This is a white man's government, and it will remain so forever, for God Almighty has stamped his seal and sign of sovereignty upon the Anglo-Saxon tribe."

In 1903, Graves made a statement defending lynching: "The problem of the hour is not how to prevent lynching in the South, but the larger question: How shall we destroy the crime which always has and always will provoke lynching? The answer which the mob returns to this vital question is already known. The mob answers it with the rope, the bullet, and sometimes, God save us! with the torch. And the mob is practical; its theory is effective to a large degree. The mob is today the sternest, the strongest, and the most effective restraint that the age holds for the control of rape."

Graves advocated for the deportation of African-Americans to the Pacific Islands, "some untaken and underdeveloped Western territory", or Africa. He stated that the Fifteenth Amendment was "the American mistake of the century". Black leaders claimed Graves was the most influential voice in support of the 1906 Atlanta Race Riot.

In a commencement address to the University of Chicago, Graves advocated sending black people to the Philippines, where they would form their own government. Under his scheme, whites would not be allowed to vote there, and blacks would not be able to vote in the United States. The speech prompted an opposing letter to the editor of the Brooklyn Eagle by black journalist Jack Thorne, who said Graves's claims that white women were not safe to walk the streets of Atlanta were nonsense.

=== 1908 vice presidential candidacy ===
The newly formed Independence Party decided to hold a national convention in Chicago, Illinois. Graves was nominated as one of the candidates for president on July 27. The first ballot saw a tally of 396 votes for Thomas L. Hisgen, 213 for Graves, 200 for Milford W. Howard, 71 for Reuben R. Lyon, and 49 for William Randolph Hearst. A second ballot brought Hisgen to the doorstep of nomination, gathering 590 votes, compared to 189 for Graves and 109 for Howard. Only in the early morning hours of Wednesday, July 29 would Hisgen go over the top and win the nomination. Graves was subsequently chosen as the party's nominee for vice president.

In the general election, the Independence Party ticket received 82,574 votes (0.55%), coming in fifth place. It performed best in Massachusetts, where it received 4.2% of the popular vote. Following the general election defeat, the Independence Party quickly faded away into obscurity although it fielded candidates in New York until 1914.

=== Later career ===
Graves later rejoined the Democratic Party and spoke at the 1912 Democratic National Convention.

Graves was among the first to suggest that a mammoth statue of Robert E. Lee be sculpted as a Confederate memorial on the side of Stone Mountain, Georgia.

== Personal life ==
Graves married Mattie E. Simpson on April 17, 1878, and Anne (Annie) E. Cothran on December 30, 1890. He had two daughters, Mrs. Frederick Tomkins and Anne Graves; and three sons, John Temple Graves Jr., James de Graffenried Graves, and Cothran Calhoun Graves. He died in Washington, D.C., on August 8, 1925, at the age of 68.

His grandson, the child of daughter Laura Graves Tomkins, is renowned author and art critic Calvin Tomkins, who said his grandfather was "an outspoken racist and was largely responsible for inciting the great Atlanta race riot of 1906."
