= Mulberry Hill (Lexington, Virginia) =

Historic house in Lexington, Virginia, US

- U.S. National Register of Historic Places
- Virginia Landmarks Register
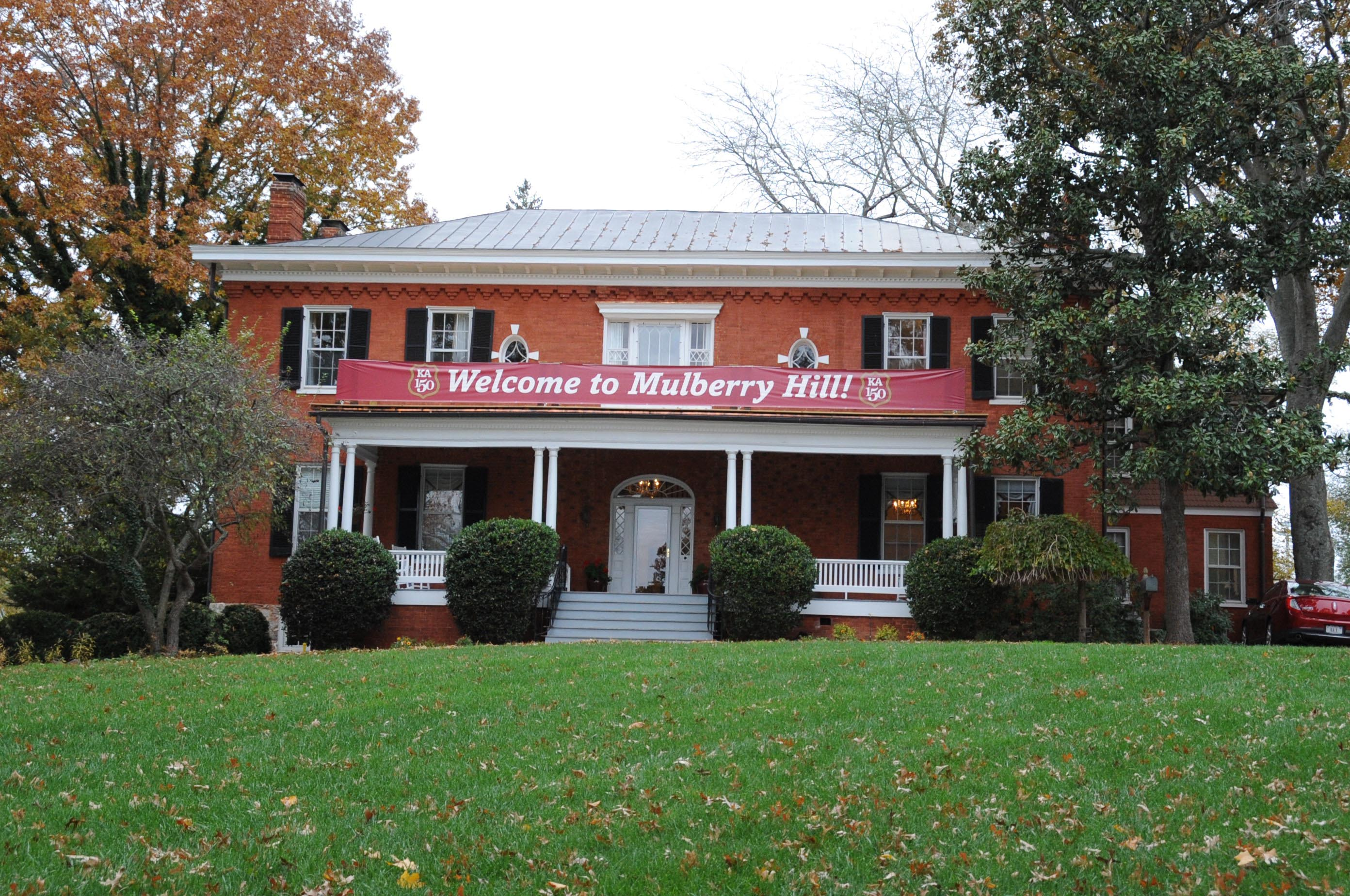

- Location within Virginia Location within the United States
- Location: Liberty Hall Rd., Lexington, Virginia
- Coordinates: 37°47′24″N 79°27′0″W
- Area: 7.7 acres (3.1 ha)
- Built: c. 1798-1805, c. 1860, c. 1903
- Architect: William C. McDowell
- Architectural style: Mixed (more Than 2 Styles From Different Periods)
- NRHP reference No.: 82004671
- VLR No.: 117-0010

Significant dates
- Added to NRHP: September 9, 1982
- Designated VLR: June 15, 1982

Mulberry Hill is a historic mansion located at Lexington, Virginia that dest to around 1797. It was listed on the National Register of Historic Places in 1982. It is currently the national headquarters of Kappa Alpha Order collegiate fraternity.

== History ==
Rev. William Graham established Mulberry Hill plantation house around 1777. He was a Presbyterian minister who served as the rector for Liberty Hall Academy (now Washington and Lee University).

Andrew Reid, the Rockingham County clerk of court purchased the plantation in 1797. He replaced Graham's house with a one-story brick house. His son, Samuel Reid, inherited the house and expanded it in the mid-19th century. In addition to following his father as clerk of court, he was an amateur architect and served as a Washington College senior trustee for fifty years. Robert E. Lee was a guest at Mulberry Hill for four nights in September 1865, where he met the trustee of the college before becoming its president.

Eleanor Junkin Cox Latane purchased Mulberry Hill in 1903. She hired local architect William C. McDowell to expand the house. Washington and Lee law professor Lewis Tyree Sr. purchased the house in 1931. He added a walled garden to the property. Lewis Tyree’s wife, Winifred West Tyree cared and matured the garden until her death in 1973. Lewis Tyree Jr. inherited the house from his father.

The house was listed on the Virginia Landmarks Register on June 15, 1982. It was listed on the National Register of Historic Places in September 9, 1982. The state of Virginia Department of Historic Resources holds a historic preservation easement on the property.

The Kappa Alpha Order Educational Foundation purchased Mulberry Hill and 7.7 acres from Tyree and has used it as the headquarters of Kappa Alpha Order since 2004. Kappa Alpha was founded at Washington and Lee University.

== Architecture ==
Mulberry Hill was built in at least four different periods, ranging from the late 18th century to the early 20th century. The original one-story, double-pile core was built about 1797. Its stone foundation may be from an earlier house on the property. This original, four-room brick house in the core of the mansion today. The interior features a central passage plan and elaborate provincial Georgian woodwork and plasterwork.

Amateur architect and owner Samuel Reid designed a second story with a gable roof that was added in the mid-19th century. The common bond of the second story contrasts with the Flemish bond of the original house. The molding of the addition was in Italianate style.

In 1903, the house was again expanded under the authority of local architect William G. McDowell. He added the current front porch, a corbeled cornice, and two oval windows to the front of the house. He also raised the roof to add a hipped roof. The front of the house features decorated painted bondwork, including a red wash with gray penciling on the mortar joints. A walled garden was added to the property after 1931 and features a view of House Mountain.

== See also ==
- North American fraternity and sorority housing
