= Henry Ruffner =

American educator and minister (1790–1861)

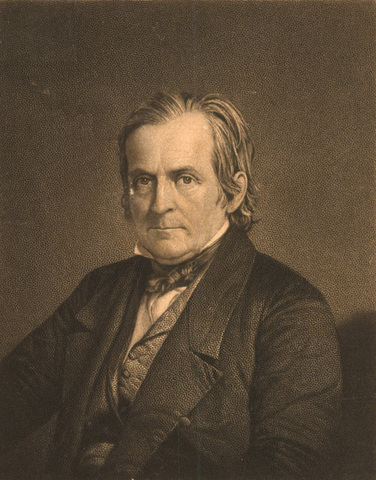

President of Washington College (now Washington and Lee University)
- In office 1837–1848
- Preceded by: Henry Vethake
- Succeeded by: George Junkin

Personal details
- Born: January 16, 1790 Page County, Virginia, U.S.
- Died: December 17, 1861 (aged 71) Malden, West Virginia, U.S.
- Children: William Henry Ruffner
- Education: Washington College
- Profession: educator, minister

Henry Ruffner (January 16, 1790 – December 17, 1861) was an educator and Presbyterian minister who served as president of Washington College (now Washington and Lee University). Although a slaveholder himself, Ruffner became known for criticizing slavery as an impediment to Virginia's economic development in the years preceding the American Civil War. His controversial views contributed to his resignation from Washington College presidency and his retirement to his farm.

== Early life and education ==
Ruffner was born on January 16, 1790, near the Willow Grove Mills on Hawkshill Creek in Page County, about a mile above Luray, Virginia, to the former Lydia Ann Brumbach and her husband David C. Ruffner.

In 1794, his grandfather, Joseph Ruffner Sr., purchased land west of the Appalachian Mountains in the Kanawha River Valley from John Dickinson, including a famous salt spring. After visiting the area in 1795, Joseph Ruttner Sr. relocated there and was joined within a year by his five sons, his daughter, and their families. He continued to buy land nearby, including the defensive Clendenin Blockhouse,

In 1796, Joseph Ruffner Sr.'s eldest son, David Ruffner (1767-1843), moved with his three sons into the blockhouse. David's fourth son Lewis Ruffner, who would later become a prominent salt producer, was born there in 1797. Upon Joseph Ruffner Sr.'s death 1803, his property was divided among his sons David (Henry's father), Daniel, Joseph Jr., Samuel, Abraham and Tobias.

David Ruffner received the property closest to what would later become Charleston, West Virginia, including land from the mouth of Campbell’s Creek to the cross line above Malden, as well as the salt lick previously leased to Elisha Brooks. In 1805, David Ruffner purchased a mill and house from George Alderson and moved his family to Malden, then known as the Kanawha Salines, where he began developing saltworks, using enslaved labor. Tobias Ruffner established a separate salt operation upstream, and between 1799 and 1812, settlers elected David Ruffner multiple times to represent them part-time in the Virginia House of Delegates.

By 1815, the number of salt furnaces in the area had reached 52, extending four miles below and three miles above the original Ruffner operation. As nearby wood supplies became depleted, David Ruffner converted part of the fuel supply to coal. In 1817, David Ruffner, along with his brothers Joseph Jr. and Daniel, helped found the Kanawha Salt Company, a regional salt-production monopoly organized with the assistance of attorney Joseph Lovell.

Ruffner completed the academy’s classical curriculum by May 1812 and subsequently enrolled at Washington College in Lexington, Virginia, completing the four-year program in approximately eighteen months. He studied under Professor William Graham, a Princeton graduate of 1773. Ruffner graduated in 1814, continued theological studies, and was ordained as a Presbyterian minister in 1815, with instructions to establish a presbytery in the Kanawha Valley. He received a Doctor of Divinity degree from Princeton in 1838.

== Family life and slaveholdings ==
Ruffner married twice. On March 30, 1819, he married Sarah M. Lyle in Rockbridge County, Virginia. Their children included Julia, William (1824–1928), Anne, and David. Following Sarah’s death, Ruffner married Laura Jane Kirby in November 1849 in Hamilton, Ohio; their only child died in infancy.

According to federal census records, Ruffner owned four enslaved people in 1820, six in 1830, and four in 1840. He may have emancipated those enslaved following his 1847 publications on slavery, although he does not appear in the digitized 1850 census. That census lists his brother Lewis Ruffner and his uncle Joseph Ruffner as major slaveholders in Kanawha County, owning 47 and 25 enslaved people respectively. Other Ruffner relatives listed as slaveholders in 1850 included Charles Ruffner (8), James Ruffner (12), Augustus Ruffner (5), Joel Ruffner (8), and Isaac Ruffner (3).

In the 1860 census, the 70-year-old Ruffner and his 32-year-old wife Laura J. Ruffner were residing with the family of James and Eliza Gaines at the Kanawha Salines. At that time, Ruffner owned $13,000 in real estate and $3,000 in personal property. Although he does not appear in the corresponding slave schedules, evidence indicates that he retained ownership of enslaved people through at least 1861. In his final will, dated November 8, 1861, Ruffner bequeathed to his wife “the possession, use and benefit of my servant woman Martha and her five children” for the duration of her natural life, subject to specific conditions, including a prohibition on removing them from Kanawha County without the executor’s consent.

== Career ==
In 1819, in addition to his duties at various churches in the area, and with his family's farms, Ruffner returned to Washington College as a professor of ancient languages, holding that post until 1837, during which time he twice served as acting president. In 1837 Ruffner became the college's president and delivered an inaugural address that emphasized such classic themes as self-control and the importance of education in guiding American society. In 1847 Ruffner published an anti-slavery pamphlet, Address to the People of West Virginia; showing the Slavery is Injurious to the Public Welfare, (that became known as the "Ruffner pamphlet"). The pamphlet grew out of a debate that Ruffner had before Lexington's Franklin Society over slavery with Lexington Law School Professor John White Brockenbrough and Virginia Military Institute Professor Francis Henney Smith. At the time, his son William H. Ruffner, had withdrawn from Princeton University because of ill health, though he traveled in Montgomery County Maryland collecting manumitted slaves for emigration to Liberia as an agent of the American Colonization Society. Though the elder Ruffner was quite critical of "abolitionists," he argued against slavery on economic grounds and was criticized occasionally by proslavery politicians in Virginia in the decade before the war. This moderate anti-slavery position seems to have represented something of a change because in 1839 Ruffner had published a novella, Judith Bensaddi whose title character argued against abolition of slavery. During his presidency, such speakers as Princeton educator Archibald Alexander (himself a graduate of Liberty Hall, the predecessor of Washington College), Minister Elias Lyman Magoon, and Professor George Dabney delivered graduation addresses at Washington College. Among Ruffner's colleagues at Washington College were George Dabney and George Dod Armstrong.

Ruffner's views brought him into conflict with some members of the College and Lexington community, where relations were already strained because of conflicts between the missions of Washington College and the nearby Virginia Military Institute, as well as because of sectarian disputes. Ruffner tendered his resignation as president in 1848. He was replaced by George Junkin, then president of Lafayette College, who had lost his job at Miami University in Ohio a few years early for his pro-slavery views.

Ruffner spent some time teaching at the University of Virginia in 1850 and 1851; In 1850 he published The Fathers of the Desert. Apart from his farming activities, Ruffner visited Louisville, Kentucky, where he continued his anti-slavery advocacy. He is purported to be the author of a brief attack published around 1849 on Ellwood Fisher's proslavery pamphlet, Lecture on the North and South, though the attribution is questionable. Ruffner then returned to Kanawha; he delivered a pro-Union speech in on July 4, 1856.

== Death and legacy ==
Ruffner died at his home in Malden shortly after the outbreak of the American Civil War and after residents of western Virginia voted to secede from Virginia. He is buried in the Ruffner family cemetery in Malden. He is also commemorated at the Stonewall Jackson Memorial Cemetery in Lexington, where he is listed alongside his son, William Henry Ruffner, who remained in the Shenandoah Valley and became a Presbyterian minister, educator, Virginia’s first superintendent of public instruction following the war, and later president of the State Female Normal School, which subsequently became Longwood University.

Academic offices
Preceded by George A. Baxter	President of Washington and Lee University; 1829—1830	Succeeded by Louis Marshall
Preceded by Henry Vethake	President of Washington and Lee University; 1836—1848	Succeeded by George Junkin
