= Kenneth P. Ruscio =

University professor and president

Kenneth Patrick Ruscio (1954) is an American university professor of politics, public policy, and leadership. He was elected President of Washington and Lee University on March 7, 2006, serving through the end of 2016 and has been interim president since May 11, 2026. He was previously Dean of the Jepson School of Leadership Studies at the University of Richmond (2002-2006), and, at Washington and Lee, served as Associate Dean of the Williams School of Commerce, Economics, and Politics and as Dean of Freshmen. He has taught courses in leadership, environmental and public policy, American national government, and environmental studies. Ruscio studied at Christian Brothers Academy in Lincroft, New Jersey, until 1972, when he entered Washington and Lee. He earned his Bachelor of Arts from Washington and Lee with a major in politics, with honors, and was elected to Phi Beta Kappa and Omicron Delta Kappa, the national leadership honorary. He went on to earn a Master of Public Administration (1978) and a Ph.D. (1983) from Syracuse University's Maxwell School of Citizenship and Public Affairs.

Ruscio is the author of 'The Leadership Dilemma in Modern Democracy, has served two terms (2002-2006) as president of Omicron Delta Kappa and was president of the Virginia Foundation of Independent Colleges from 2017-2019.
