= Samuel Zenas Ammen =

American journalist and fraternity founder

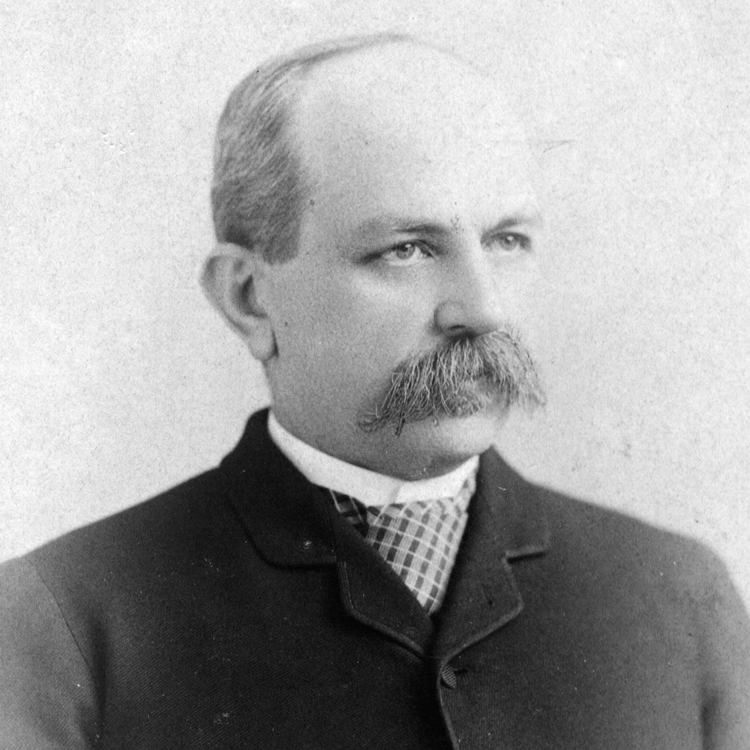
- Born: October 23, 1843; Fincastle, Botetourt County, Virginia
- Died: January 5, 1929 (aged 85); Daytona Beach, Volusia County, Florida
- Resting place: Oak Grove Cemetery, Lexington, Virginia
- Education: Washington and Lee University
- Occupation: Journalist
- Parent(s): Benjamin Ammen; Naomi (Cross) Ammen

Samuel Zenas Ammen (1843–1929) was an American Confederate veteran and journalist. He is known as the 'Practical Founder' of the Kappa Alpha Order. He was the literary editor of The Baltimore Sun and author of three books.

== Early life ==
Samuel Zenas Ammen was born on October 23, 1843, in Fincastle, Virginia. Benjamin Ammen was his father and Naomi (Cross) Ammen was his mother.

During the American Civil War of 1861–1865, Ammen served in the Confederate States Army. He enlisted in Company D ("Finchester Rifles") of the 11th Virginia Infantry on August 31, 1861, for one year of service and was discharged May 15, 1863, or May 18, 1862. He then served with Captain William Andrew McCue's Fincastle Cavalry Company, Burks' Regiment Virginia Local Defense to do cavalry service with the Confederate Home Guard in Botetourt County.

Following the war, Ammen attended Washington College in Lexington, Virginia, where Confederate General Robert E. Lee was President. While there, he founded the Kappa Alpha Order. He designed its ritual, accolade and prayer. He served as its second Knight Commander after John Francis Rogers for six terms. During his tenure, he helped establish twenty-two active chapters and four alumni chapters.

== Career ==
Ammen became the literary editor of The Baltimore Sun from 1881 to 1911. He was also the author of three books.

== Death ==
Ammen died on January 5, 1929, in Daytona Beach, Florida. He was buried at the Oak Grove Cemetery in Lexington, Virginia.

== Publications ==
- Ammen, Samuel Zenas (1876). A Latin grammar for beginners combining the analytic and synthetic methods, containing the inflections, the more important principles of syntax, ... parsing and analysis, and vocabulary. New York: Lange, Little & Co.
- Ammen, Samuel Zenas (1886). The caverns of Luray: an illustrated guide-book to the caverns, explaining the manner of their formation, their peculiar growths, their geology, chemistry, etc. Philadelphia: Allen, Lane & Scott's Printing House.
- History of Maryland Commands in the Confederate Service.
