= George Dabney =

American academic

- Born: George Edward Dabney; 1808
- Died: 1868
- Occupation(s): Educator and scholar

George Edward Dabney (1808–1868) was an educator and scholar of classics, who served on the faculty of Washington College (now Washington and Lee University) from 1837 to 1854.

== Early life ==
George Dabney was born in 1808. He graduated from the University of Virginia.

== Career ==
Dabney taught at New London Academy in Bedford County, Virginia. Later, he taught ancient languages at Washington College in 1837. He delivered a graduation address at Washington College in 1838 on the importance of studying classics and published "On the Study of Ancient Languages in the United States," in the Southern Literary Messenger in 1851. He also delivered an address "on the value of writing," to the alumni of the University of Virginia in June 1849.

Dabney was, with fellow Washington College professor Henry Ruffner, active in the anti-slavery movement in western Virginia and he freed several of his slaves in the 1850s.

== Death ==
Dabney died in 1868.
