= Mark Sappenfield =

American journalist

Mark Sappenfield is an American journalist who served as the editor-in-chief of The Christian Science Monitor from 2017 to 2025.

== Career ==
Sappenfield received a degree in journalism from Washington and Lee University in 1996. After graduating, he began at The Christian Science Monitor as a staff editor and writer. Sappenfield held assignments across the United States and South Asia, and in 2009 he became the Monitor's deputy national news editor. From 2014 to 2017 he was the national news editor and was on the Monitor's editorial managing team, before taking over as editor-in-chief in 2017.

Sappenfield has written on the issues of politics, sports and science from Washington, D.C., the San Francisco Bay Area, Boston, Afghanistan, Pakistan and India, and has reported from seven Olympic Winter and Summer Games. He has also written about events at NASA's Jet Propulsion Laboratory, which included the landing of the Mars Opportunity rover.

As editor, Sappenfield helped to develop and produce the Monitor's “values projects,” including The Respect Project, Finding Resilience, and Rebuilding Trust.

The Monitor announced in October 2024 that Sappenfield will be stepping back from his role as editor. Christa Case Bryant will take the reins in early 2025 and will become only the second woman to ever hold the title at the paper. Covering Congress for the Monitor over the span of four years, Bryant won the National Press Foundation’s Dirksen Award for Distinguished Reporting of Congress in 2022, and the 2023 Sigma Delta Chi Award for Washington Correspondence. Sappenfield will continue at the Monitor in a senior role.
