= Prescott Prince =

American lawyer and officer in the United States Navy Reserve

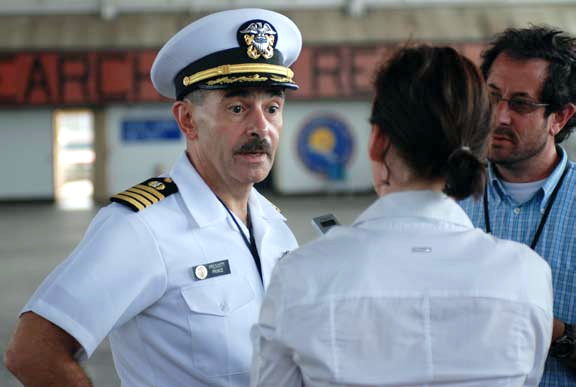
- Navy Capt. Prescott Prince, standby defense counsel for alleged Sept. 11 mastermind Khalid Sheikh Mohammed, addresses media in McCalla Hangar following a hearing here, July 10, 2008
- Born: 1952 (age 73–74)
- Military career
- Branch: United States Navy Reserve
- Rank: Captain

Prescott Prince (born November 15, 1954) is an American lawyer and officer in the United States Navy Reserve. Prince is notable for being assigned to represent Guantanamo captive Khalid Sheikh Mohammed.

== Education ==
Education
1976	B.A.	Davidson College
1980	M.A.	Radford University
1983	J.D.	Washington and Lee University School of Law

Member of Kappa Alpha Order.

== Legal career ==
Prince shifted from the regular Navy to the reserves in 1987 and graduated from Washington and Lee University School of Law, and had a civilian law practice in Richmond, Virginia until his recall to active duty in June 2007. For the remainder of 2007 Prince served as a "rule of law officer" in Iraq.

In 2008 Prince was assigned Khalid Sheikh Mohammed as a client.
