= List of presidents of Washington and Lee University =

Washington and Lee University is led by a president selected by the Board of Trustees. The university was founded in 1749 as Augusta Academy. It later became Liberty Hall Academy (1782), Washington Academy (1798), Washington College (1813), and finally Washington and Lee University (1871). The office of president was not created until 1782.

== Presidents ==
The following persons have served as president of Washington and Lee University:

No.	Image	Chancellor	Term start	Term end	Ref.
Principals of Augusta Academy (1749–1776)
1		Robert Alexander	1749	1762	
2		John Brown	1762	1776	
Principal of Liberty Hall Academy (1782–1796)
3		William Graham (Note: Even though Graham was appointed by the trustees in 1776, the academy may have operated sporadically between 1776 and 1782 due to the Revolutionary War.)	1776	1796	
Rector of Liberty Hall Academy (1782–1796)
4		Samuel Legrande Campbell	1796	1799	
Rector of Washington Academy (1798–1813)
5		Rev. George A. Baxter	1799	1829	
Presidents of Washington College (1813–1871)
acting		Rev. Henry Ruffner	1829	1830	
6		Louis Marshall	1830	1834	
acting		Rev. Henry Ruffner	1834	1834	
7		Henry Vethake	1834	1836	
8		Rev. Henry Ruffner	1836	1848	
9		Rev. George Junkin	1848	April 1861	
10		Robert E. Lee	1865	October 12, 1870 (Note: Died in office.)	
Presidents of Washington and Lee University (1871–present)
11		George Washington Custis Lee (Note: Son of Robert E. Lee.)	1871	1897	
12		William Lyne Wilson	1897	October 17, 1900	
acting		Henry St. George Tucker III	1900	1901	
14		George H. Denny	1901	1911 (Note: Resigned to lead the University of Alabama.)	
acting (Note: Brothers Henry Donald Campbell and John Lyle Campbell Jr. served as co-acting presidents from 1911 to 1912.)		Henry D. Campbell	1911	1912	
acting		John L. Campbell Jr.	1911	1912	
15		Henry L. Smith	1912	1929	
acting		Robert H. Tucker	1930	1930	
17		Francis Pendleton Gaines	1930	1959	
18		Fred C. Cole	1959	August 31, 1967 (Note: Resigned to lead the Council on Library Resources.)	
acting		William Webb Pusey III	September 1, 1967	February 4, 1968	
20		Robert E. R. Huntley	February 5, 1968	January 14, 1983	
21		John Delane Wilson	January 15, 1983	June 30, 1995	
22		John William Elrod	July 1, 1995	July 27 2001	
acting		H. Laurent Boetsch Jr.	August 3, 2001	June 30, 2002	
24		Thomas Gerard Burish	July 1, 2002	August 14, 2005 (Note: Resigned to become Notre Dame provost.)	
acting		Harlan Ray Beckley	August 15, 2005	June 30, 2006	
26		Kenneth Patrick Ruscio	July 1, 2006	December 31, 2016	
27		William C. Dudley	January 1, 2017	June 30, 2026	
acting		Kenneth Patrick Ruscio	July 1, 2026	pending	

Table notes:
