= Ronald J. Bacigal =

American legal scholar and professor of law

- Education: Concord University; Washington and Lee University (JD)
- Occupation: Professor of law
- Known for: Criminal law

Ronald J. Bacigal is an American legal scholar and professor emeritus at the University of Richmond School of Law. He is a leading authority on Virginia criminal law and procedure. In 2008, Criminal Law News reported that he was "nationally recognized as one of the leading scholars of Fourth Amendment Law."

Bacigal graduated from Concord University and Washington and Lee University School of Law. He spent time at The Hague as a Fulbright Scholar. Bacigal has taught at Richmond since 1971 and has been a professor since 1973. He has been a visiting professor at Duke Law School and Washington & Lee Law School. He is the reporter for criminal law decisions of the Court of Appeals of Virginia.

He has earned a number of awards, including the 2008 Harry L. Carrico Professionalism Award (presented by the Virginia State Bar), the Outstanding Faculty Award from the State Council of Higher Education for Virginia in 1990, and is a two-time recipient of the University of Richmond Distinguished Educator Award. Bacigal has authored a number of texts used in both educational and legal settings, including Criminal Procedure: Cases, Problems, Exercises (West Publishing Co. 3rd ed. 2007) (2nd ed. 2004) (1sted. 2001) (with four other authors and annual supplements) and Criminal Law and Procedure: An Introduction (West Publishing Co. 2nd ed. 2001)(1st ed. 1996), "May It Please The Court: A Biography of Judge Robert R. Merhige Jr." (University Press of America 1992), "The Limits of Litigation: The Dalkon Shield Controversy" (Carolina Academic Press 1990) and many books concerning Virginia law and procedure. He has also published numerous papers.
