= Robert J. Grey Jr. =

American lawyer

Robert James Grey Jr. is an American lawyer. He served as president of the American Bar Association from 2004 to 2005. He was previously a partner with the Richmond, Virginia-based law firm of Hunton & Williams. In January 2010, he was named executive director of the Leadership Council on Legal Diversity, an organization created in 2009 to advance diversity in the legal profession.

In March 2010, he was confirmed by the United States Senate as a member of the board of the Legal Services Corporation, the nation's largest provider of civil legal assistance to the poor.
