= Robert Shepherd =

American jurist (1937–2008)

- Born: Robert E. Shepherd Jr. September 22, 1937; Richmond, Virginia, US
- Died: December 11, 2008 (aged 71); Richmond, Virginia, US
- Education: Washington & Lee University; Washington and Lee School of Law
- Occupation: Professor of law
- Known for: Family law, Juvenile advocacy
- Spouse: Nancy Baker Shepherd
- Children: 5
- Awards: University of Richmond School of Law Educator Award(1981,1986); Virginia State Bar Harry L. Carrico Professionalism Award (2003); ABA Livingston Hall Juvenile Justice Award (2005)

Robert E. Shepherd Jr. (September 11, 1937 – December 11, 2008) was professor of law at the University of Richmond School of Law from 1978 until his retirement in 2001. After retirement, he served as professor emeritus and continued teaching until his death.

A paper he wrote for the Washington and Lee Law Review became a draft of Virginia's first statute on child abuse and set Shepherd on track for his career. He was the recipient of the ABA Livingston Hall Juvenile Justice Award in 2005 and the 2003 Virginia State Bar Harry L. Carrico Professionalism Award. A founder and board member of Richmond law school's National Center for Family Law, Shepherd was a sought after expert in courts, before legislative committees and in legal forums around the nation on issues related to children's rights. Over his 40-year career, he headed the American Bar Association's Juvenile Justice Committee and the Virginia Bar Association's Committee on the Needs of Children. He served as reporter on family law and contracts for the Virginia Court of Appeals.

== Early life ==
Robert E. Shepherd Jr. was born on September 11, 1937, in Richmond, Virginia, and was the son of Robert Edward Shepherd and his previous wife, Julia Shepherd. His siblings were his sister Susan and his brother Walter. He had five children, a son Robert Shepherd III, two daughters, Sharon and Stephanie, and two stepdaughters Kara and Courtney.

== Education ==
Shepherd received his undergraduate degree at Washington & Lee University, in 1959. In 1961 he graduated from the Washington and Lee School of Law.

== Career ==
Shepherd served in the United States Army Judge Advocate General's Corps, then went into private practice in Richmond. He joined the Virginia Attorney General's office in 1971, becoming its first assistant attorney general dedicated to youth services. In 1975, he turned to teaching full-time at the University of Baltimore before returning to Richmond.

At Richmond Shepherd taught classes on "Children and the Law," "Family Law," and "Contracts," amongst other topics. He was a visiting professor during the fall of 2008 at the Washington and Lee School of Law. In a 2001 interview with the law school's magazine, he said, "There was a real sense that laws for children were civil rights laws. It was a very exciting time."

Shepherd was a vocal supporter of the Baltimore Orioles and a proud political liberal. He sported the bumper sticker "Jefferson Was a Democrat" on the car he drove to the University of Richmond campus (which is located in a well-heeled western area of the City of Richmond).

Shepherd authored papers for scholarly journals that include Family Law Quarterly, the ABA's Criminal Justice Magazine, the Journal of Divorce and Remarriage, and the Journal of the Office of Juvenile Justice and Delinquency Prevention. Virginia Governor Tim Kaine appointed Shepherd to the Advisory Committee on Juvenile Justice on January 19, 2007.

== Death ==
Shepherd died of cancer at the age of 71 at his Richmond home on December 11, 2008. Memorial services were held at the River Road Church, Baptist in Henrico County where he taught Sunday school for 36 years, and was later followed by a private interment.

== Honors and awards ==
In 1999, Shepherd was the first person inducted into the Virginia Juvenile Court Hall of Fame. The Virginia Bar Association honors Shepherd at its Summer Meeting at The Homestead, with the Robert E. Shepherd Jr. Award for excellence in advocacy for children.

Shepherd has received the Child Advocacy Award from the National Association of Counsel for Children.

Additional awards include:

- 1981 - University of Richmond School of Law Educator Award
- 1986 - University of Richmond School of Law Educator Award
- 2003 - Virginia State Bar Harry L. Carrico Professionalism Award
- 2005 - ABA Livingston Hall Juvenile Justice Award

The University of Richmond School of Law has posthumously honored Shepherd with the William Green Award for Professional Excellence. He was the first full-time faculty member to receive the university's highest award. To further Shepherd's work, the National Center for Family Law at Richmond has also raised money to endow the Robert E. Shepherd Fellowship Fund.
