= Walter D. Kelley Jr. =

American judge (born 1955)

Walter DeKalb Kelley, Jr.

Judge of the United States District Court for the Eastern District of Virginia
- In office August 16, 2004 – May 16, 2008
- Appointed by: George W. Bush
- Preceded by: Henry Coke Morgan Jr.
- Succeeded by: Anthony Trenga

Personal details
- Born: Walter DeKalb Kelley Jr. July 28, 1955 (age 70) Norfolk, Virginia
- Education: Washington and Lee University (BA, JD)

Walter DeKalb Kelley Jr. (born July 28, 1955) is an American jurist who served as United States district judge of the United States District Court for the Eastern District of Virginia from August 2004 to May 2008.

== Education and career ==
A native of Virginia's second-largest city, Norfolk, Walter Kelley received a Bachelor of Arts degree from Washington and Lee University in 1977 and remained at the Washington and Lee University Law School, where he earned a Juris Doctor in 1981. He was a law clerk in New York City to United States Court of Appeals for the Second Circuit Judge Ellsworth Van Graafeiland from 1981 to 1982 and then entered private practice in Norfolk, remaining from 1982 to 2004. In 2003 he served as adjunct professor of law, Regent University.

== Federal judicial service ==
On October 31, 2003, President George W. Bush nominated Kelley to the United States District Court for the Eastern District of Virginia seat vacated by Henry Coke Morgan, Jr. He was confirmed by the Senate on June 23, 2004, and received his commission on August 16, 2004. In 2007, he was among several lawyers and jurists recommended by the Virginia Bar Association for two open Virginia seats on the United States Court of Appeals for the Fourth Circuit.

== Resignation ==
On February 11, 2008, Kelley announced that he would resign from the bench, explaining in a follow-up interview that "I don't so much enjoy the day-to-day drugs and guns and immigration cases that make up much of our docket...." His resignation took effect on May 16 and he subsequently joined the Washington, D.C. offices of the worldwide law firm Jones Day. After six years at Jones Day, Kelley moved to litigation specialty firm Hausfeld, LLP, in the fall of 2014.

== Sources ==
Legal offices
Preceded by Henry Coke Morgan, Jr.	Judge of the United States District Court for the Eastern District of Virginia; 2004–2008	Succeeded by Anthony Trenga
