= Vance A. Funk III =

American politician (born 1942)

Mayor of Newark, Delaware
- In office 2005–2013
- Preceded by: Harold Godwin
- Succeeded by: Polly Sierer

Personal details
- Born: December 16, 1942 (age 83) Philadelphia, Pennsylvania, U.S.

Vance Anderson Funk III (born December 16, 1942) is an American lawyer and politician from Newark, Delaware. He was the mayor of Newark from 2005 until he retired in 2013.

== Early life ==
Funk was born December 16, 1942, in Philadelphia, Pennsylvania. He earned a BS in business administration from the University of Delaware in 1965 and received a JD from the Washington and Lee University School of Law in 1968. He was a lieutenant in the U.S. Army and served a year in the 519th MP Battalion during the Vietnam War.

== Career ==
Funk became a real estate agent after graduating from law school. In 1972, he became alderman for the city of Newark, a position he held until 1986. He opened a law firm in 1975, and returned to private practice in 2000. He retired from his firm in 2017, turning it over to his son.

In 2004, Funk was elected mayor of Newark, defeating incumbent Harold Godwin with 74 percent of the vote. He was reelected three times. He was a member of the Mayors Against Illegal Guns Coalition that was formed in 2006.

On August 8, 2013, Funk announced his resignation as mayor, citing health concerns brought on by stress from community opposition to the construction of a Wawa convenience store and gas pumps near his neighborhood. Funk supported the proposal while many of his neighbors had organized a grassroots campaign against it. Several days later, he announced he was moving his date of resignation forward three months to September 30.
