= Kappa Alpha Order =

North American collegiate fraternity

- ΚΑ
- Founded: December 21, 1865; 160 years ago Washington University
- Type: Social
- Affiliation: FFC
- Former affiliation: NIC
- Status: Active
- Scope: National
- Motto: Dieu et les Dames "God and the Ladies"
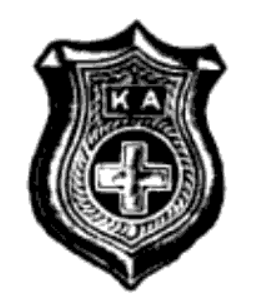
- Member badge
- Colors: Crimson and Old Gold
- Flag
- Flower: Crimson Rose and Magnolia Blossom
- Publication: The Kappa Alpha Journal
- Philanthropy: Muscular Dystrophy Association
- Chapters: 122 active 103 alumni
- Members: approx. 7,600 active 150,000+ lifetime
- Nicknames: Kappa Alpha, KA, The Order
- Headquarters: Kappa Alpha Order at Mulberry Hill; 115 Liberty Hall Road; Lexington, Virginia 24450; United States
- Website: kappaalphaorder.org

Kappa Alpha Order (ΚΑ), commonly known as Kappa Alpha, KA, or simply The Order, is an American social fraternity founded in 1865 at Washington and Lee University in Lexington, Virginia. Along with Alpha Tau Omega and Sigma Nu, the order constitutes the Lexington Triad, a trio of national fraternities formed in the same era. Kappa Alpha initially spread in the Southern United States but later added chapters elsewhere in the United States.

Because he was president of the college when the fraternity was formed, Robert E. Lee served as an advisor and "spiritual leader" of sorts for the fledgling fraternity. In 1994, KA formalized its connection to Lee by adding him into its mission statement. This connection and the organization's early adoption of a Lost Cause narrative led to activities that were racist.

As of December 2015, the Kappa Alpha Order listed 133 active chapters, five provisional chapters, and 52 inactive chapters. Since its establishment in 1865, the order has initiated more than 150,000 members. The fraternity is a founding member of the Fraternity Forward Coalition. Its national headquarters is in the historic Mulberry Hill in Lexington.

== History ==
Kappa Alpha Order (KA) was founded as Phi Kappa Chi on December 21, 1865, at Washington College, (later Washington and Lee University), in Lexington, Virginia. James Ward Wood, William Archibald Walsh, and brothers William Nelson Scott and Stanhope McClelland Scott are the founders of the fraternity. William Scott was selected as its first Number 1 or president.

The founders wanted a lodge or fraternity that would maintain and foster Southern gentlemanly conduct. Soon after the fraternity's founding, the Washington College chapter of Phi Kappa Psi protested the name "Phi Kappa Chi", due to its similarity, leading Wood to change the name to KA by April 1866.

The fraternity's ritual, written by Wood, was expanded by a new member Samuel Zenas Ammen within a year. As a master mason, Ammen brought knowledge of fraternal ceremonies to Kappa Alpha, as well as a fondness for the romance of knights and chivalry. The resulting new ritual and constitution turned KA into the Kappa Alpha Order, modeled as a Christian knighthood seeking the highest level of character and personal achievement, including "virtues of chivalry, respect for others, honor, duty, integrity and reverence for God and woman". Ammen also revised the ritual in 1871, 1893, 1904, and 1921. For his efforts, Ammen was given the title of "Practical Founder" by the fraternity.

A second chapter, Beta, was established at the adjacent Virginia Military Institute in 1868. That same year, Gamma was chartered at the University of Georgia. Additional chapters were established at Wofford College, Emory University, and Randolph–Macon College in 1869. Until 1870, the fraternity was governed by the Alpha chapter at Washington College. At that time, Kappa Alpha created a system of governance that included conventions of representatives from each chapter that elect a national executive council.

By 1899, the fraternity initiated 2,954 members, mostly at institutions in the Southern United States. The Cyclopædia of Fraternities (1899) noted that the Kappa Alpha had numerous chapters "some of which are not at institutions of the first rank...explain[ing] why its membership is, as a whole, of the highest social or scholastic grade". However, this opinion may simply reflect a Northern publication's perspective on Southern colleges at the time.

In the years that followed, the fraternity continued to spread throughout the former Confederacy, adding a few chapters outside that area in California, Pennsylvania, Maryland, Missouri, and Texas. The fraternity had 65 active chapters, 9 inactive chapters, and 21,954 members by 1930. Because of its status as a national fraternity, KA is part of the Lexington Triad, a trio of national fraternities formed at the same institution in the same era.

Kappa Alpha Order became a member of the North American Interfraternity Conference on November 27, 1909, but withdrew on January 31, 2020. In May 2020, it was one of five founding members of the Fraternity Forward Coalition (FFC). FFC maintains that local oversight by universities and colleges is not needed and infringes on the Constitutional right of fraternities to assemble.

The Kappa Alpha Order national administrative office has been located at Mulberry Hill in Lexington, Virginia since 2004. Robert E. Lee spent his first night in Lexington at Mulberry Hill, after arriving to take over as president of Washington College. Mulberry Hill is a Virginia Historic Landmark, and was listed on the National Register of Historic Places in 1982. Mulberry Hill also houses the Kappa Alpha Order Educational Foundation.

== Symbols ==
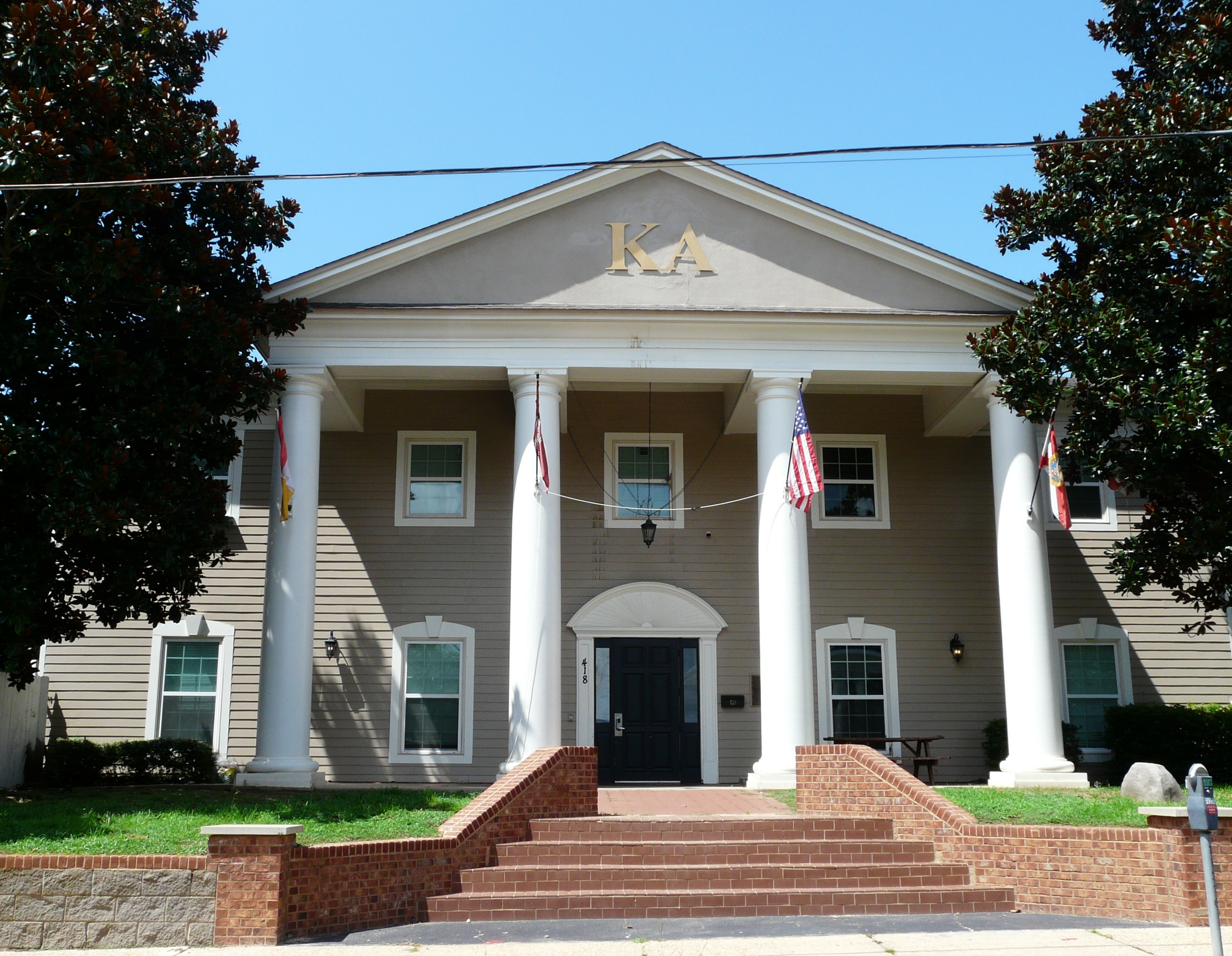
Gamma Eta Chapter at Florida State University

The bulk of Kappa Alpha Order's symbols were selected by Ammen, including its motto, crest, coat of arms, seal, flag, badge, and flowers. The Kappa Alpha Order motto is Dieu et les Dames (God and the Ladies).

The colors of KA are crimson and old gold. The colors represent the blood sacrificed (crimson red) and the money spent (old gold) in defense of the country. The fraternity's flag consists of three vertical bars (crimson, white, and old gold), with an eight-pointed cross in the center of the white field. The fraternity's flowers are the crimson rose and the magnolia blossom. The crimson rose represents masculine might and the white magnolia blossom represents purity.

The flowers of the order and a ribbon featuring the order's motto adorn the bottom of the crest. The crest itself is representative of several things; the hand holding the axe represents the continuing power of the Knight Commander and the order. The Helmet was, at one time, a symbol used by the Knight Commander of the Order. The badge is featured at the center of the crest, and the lions on either side represent different things. The lion on the left, looking away, symbolizes "rampant", meaning magnanimous. The lion on the right, looking towards you, symbolizes "regardent", which means cautious or circumspect.

The Kappa Alpha badge is a gold shield with a black shield superimposed on top of it and containing a circle and the Greek letters ΚΑ in gold. This was the second version of the fraternity's badge; the original badge consisted of a shield with the circle, Latin cross, and the Greek letters ΚΑ in black enamel. Neither version of the badge contains any jewels. The recognition pin of the Military Division of the Order features the Maltese cross, utilizing KA's colors crimson and old gold, and has eight points in the cross, which symbolize the chivalric virtues of loyalty, piety, frankness, bravery, glory and honor, contempt of death, helpfulness towards the poor and sick, and respect for the church.

The fraternity's magazine is The Kappa Alpha Journal, first published in December 1879. Its membership manual is The Varlet, a scarlet volume that includes KA's laws, history, and structure. Chapter presidents are referred to as Number 1, the Grand Master, or Knight Commander

=== Robert E. Lee ===
The founding members of Kappa Alpha Order enrolled at Washington College (now Washington and Lee University) in the spring semester of 1866. Robert E. Lee was the president of the college from the summer of 1865 until he died in 1870. James Ward Wood, one of the founders of the order, fought with Lee and the Confederacy in Company F of the 7th Virginia Cavalry. Material published by the organization describes Lee as "a true gentleman, the last gentle knight." At the 1923 Convention, Lee was designated as the "Spiritual Founder" of the order by member John Temple Graves.

Lee became the spiritual founder (i.e. a moral role model) in 1923 and part of the KA Mission Statement in 1994. Before this, the fraternity maintained no formal ties to Lee, but fraternity manuscripts mentioned Southern culture and Lee's influence on the fraternity in many ways. For example, the History and Catalogue of the Kappa Alpha Fraternity (published by the Chi chapter at Vanderbilt University in 1891 with permission by the Fifteenth Kappa Alpha Convention) describes the organization's founding:

Conceived and matured at a college of which Gen. R. E. Lee was president, at the close of a fateful military conflict; in the Valley of Virginia made dear to Southern hearts by its vigor in battling for Southern rights...plundered and wrecked by the infamous Hunter's invading force; among the people with whom Stonewall Jackson lived till duty called him to arms... with this environment it was but natural that the Order should be of a semi-military type and have for its aim the cultivation and graces conceived to be distinctively Southern.

According to some early twentieth-century KA's, Lee directly helped the fraternity expand its chapters, allowing members to “leave their academic duties . . . to install chapters in other colleges.” In one member's words, Lee promoted KA's "extension work," while The Kappa Alpha Journal reprinted others who believed Lee helped KA expand. In the 1915 review of The Birth of a Nation in The Kappa Alpha Journal, the reviewer wrote that Lee's personality helped to give the Ku Klux Klan's and Kappa Alpha's shared ideals a "stamp and character which have since connected the name of Kappa Alpha with all that is best of Southern chivalry.”

Kappa Alpha's 1891 history, notes, "Southern in its loves, it Kappa Alpha took Jackson and Lee as its favorite types of the perfect Knight." It is with this context that the organization named Robert E. Lee the spiritual founder in 1923. There are four justifications the fraternity provides for Lee's placement on a pedestal within the organization:

1. Lee's coming to Washington College as president: Lee served as an emblem of honor and duty for his students.
2. The 1915 Convention in Richmond Virginia: Here, the founding Scott brothers and Colonel Jo Lane Stern, a former aide to Lee in the Civil War, testified to Lee's influence in the genesis of the organization.
3. The 1929 convention in Louisville, Kentucky: The general body at this convention changed the convivium date (a celebration commemorating the organization's founding) to Lee's birthday, January 19.
4. Graves' 1923 Toast: At the 1923 convention in Washington D.C., former knight commander John Temple Graves gave a toast that described and solidified Lee as a spiritual founder from that point into the present day. Graves' toast was firmly rooted in the pro-Confederate and Lost Cause of the Confederacy ideology to which Kappa Alpha of this era subscribed. The toast nearly deified Lee, comparing him to Jesus Christ. The toast said that the KA Creed was born with Lee. On December 29, 1923, Graves pronounced:
  The real toast to the real founder has never been written or spoken. Let us speak it here tonight With unbroken regularity and with unfailing
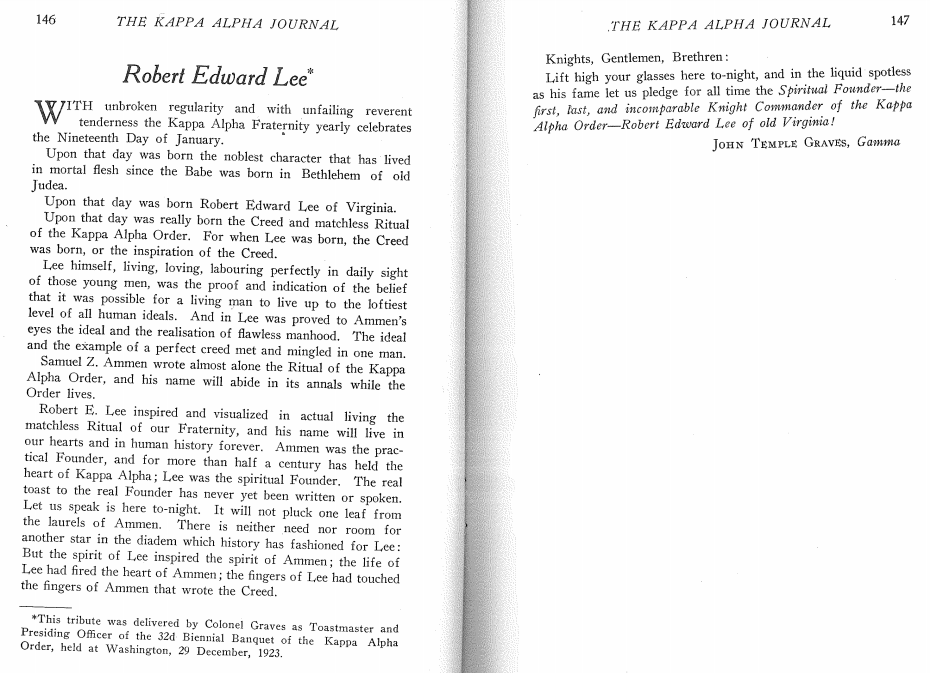
  John Temple Graves' toast to Robert E. Lee in The Kappa Alpha Journal, vol. 40, no. 2 (1924).
  reverent tenderness the Kappa Alpha Fraternity yearly celebrated the Nineteenth Day of January. Upon that day was born the noblest character that has lived in mortal flesh since the Babe was born in Bethlehem of old Judea. Upon that day was born Robert Edward Lee of Virginia. Upon that day was really born the Creed and matchless Ritual of the Kappa Alpha Order. For when Lee was born the Creed was born, or the inspiration for the Creed... Robert E. Lee inspired and visualized in actual living the matchless Ritual of our Fraternity, and his name will live in our hearts and in human history forever. Ammen was the practical Founder...Lee was the spiritual Founder...But the spirit of Lee inspired the spirit of Ammen; the life of Lee had fired the heart of Ammen; the fingers of Lee had touched the fingers of Ammen who wrote the Creed. Knights, Gentlemen, Brethren: Lift your glasses here to-night, and in the liquid spotless as his fame let us pledge for all time the Spiritual Founder--the first, last, and incomparable Knight Commander of the Kappa Alpha Order--Robert Edward Lee of Virginia.

Lee has continued to inspire the members of Kappa Alpha Order and remains the spiritual founder. In 1994, the advisory council of KA set the mission statement of the organization as such: "Kappa Alpha Order seeks to create a lifetime experience which centers on reverence to God, duty, honor, character and gentlemanly conduct as inspired by Robert E. Lee, our spiritual founder". This, too, remains unchanged, despite the ongoing internal and external controversy, over KA's association with Lee. Although, the Toast was included in the 2015 edition of The Varlet, it was removed from future editions.

== Activities ==
Kappa Alpha holds a Number I's Leadership Institute, an intensive informational and educational retreat for chapter presidents.

Project Outreach is the fraternity's philanthropic program. Its national philanthropy has been the Muscular Dystrophy Association since 1975. In 2001, the fraternity started Operation Crimson Gift, a national blood donation program. In addition to these national programs, chapters also conduct service projects in their local communities, including supporting Habitat for Humanity.

The Kappa Alpha Order Educational Foundation was established in 1982 as a 501(c)(3) charitable organization. Using funds donated by KA alumni, the Foundation provides grants for educational programs of the fraternity, such as the National Leadership Institute and Province Councils, and provides scholarships to graduate and undergraduate students.

The Loyal Order is the Kappa Alpha Order alumni membership program. The national office uses the money from Loyal Order memberships to help defray the cost of distributing the KA Journal, as well as other alumni resources. The Military Division of Kappa Alpha Order was established in 2009. Membership is open to Kappa Alphas who are currently serving, honorably discharged, or retired from the United States Armed Forces.

== Chapters ==
As of December 2015, the Kappa Alpha Order lists 133 active chapters, five provisional chapters, 52 suspended chapters, and 103 alumni chapters.

== Notable members ==
Since its establishment in 1865, the Order has initiated more than 150,000 members.

== Controversies and misconduct ==
Review of The Birth of a Nation in The Kappa Alpha Journal (1915).

=== Ku Klux Klan ===
Although Kappa Alpha Order denies any association to the prior Kuklos Adelphon organization, they acknowledge that founder James Ward Wood had affinity for some of Kuklos Adelphon's ideals.

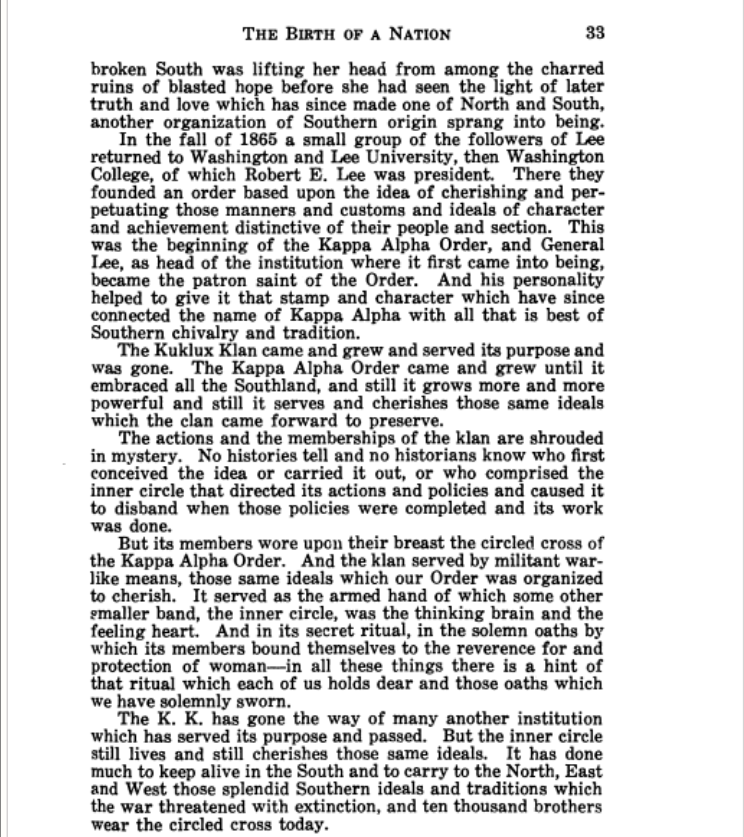
Second page of the Kappa Alpha Order's review of The Birth of a Nation.

Historian Taulby Edmondson, who has studied KA's archives, has highlighted that The Kappa Alpha Journal of the early 20th century often discussed KA's relationship to the Ku Klux Klan Upon the release of the film The Birth of a Nation in 1915, a major motion picture based on the novel The Clansman by KA alumnus Thomas Dixon Jr., two KA brothers reviewed the film in The Kappa Alpha Journal, saying that "The Kuklux Klan came and grew and served its purpose...[KA] came and grew and it embraced all the Southland...and still serves and cherishes those same ideals which the clan came forward to preserve...The actions and the membership of the Klan are shrouded in mystery...But its members wore upon their breast the circled cross of the Kappa Alpha Order." The review continued that "the Klan served, by militant, warlike means, those same ideals which our Order was organized to cherish.” Five years later, William K. Doty, editor of The Kappa Alpha Journal, noted in a book he wrote about Samuel Zenas Ammen, that “The Ku Klux Klan was of contemporaneous origins and had an identity of purpose with Kappa Alpha."

Historically, some KA chapters and members referred to themselves as a "Klan." In 1917, The Kappa Alpha Journal reported that some alumni had formed an "informal Klan" in Detroit, Michigan, and in 1913, one KA chapter called itself "the KA Klan living on the peninsula between the York and the James." In 1920, the Beta Eta chapter of Oklahoma University reported in The Kappa Alpha Journal about its Ku Klux Klan-themed dance, which it called "the talk of the University": "The girls were dressed in the days of 1865, and the members wore the white robe and hood of the Ku Klux, with a crimson cross on a golden background [KA's symbol], worn over the heart."

The 1957 edition of the University of Alabama's yearbook, The Corolla, features a photograph of KAs parading in Confederate uniforms under the words "The Klan in their afternoon formals."

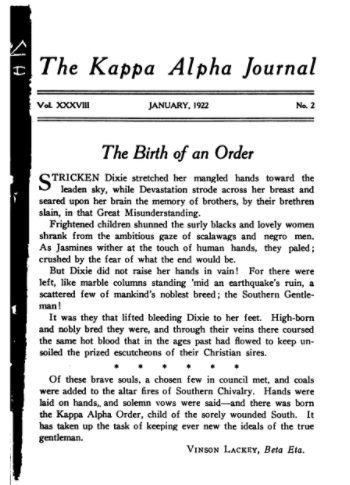
Vinson Lackey's, article in The Kappa Alpha Journal

=== Racism ===
Vinson Lackey, an associate editor for The Kappa Alpha Journal, wrote the cover article for a 1922 edition of the journal. Lackey describes what KA's believed were the white supremacist origins of the fraternity during the Reconstruction era when African Americans threatened white womanhood and southern civilization. The article's title, "The Birth of an Order," evokes the title of The Birth of a Nation.

Member John Temple Graves, who wrote the fraternity's toast to Lee, was a famed Southern orator and politician who championed lynching, white mob violence, and the codification of African American inferiority under the law on the national lecture circuit. Notably, KA supported Graves' career, and The Kappa Alpha Journal called a speech in which Graves championed the lynching of African Americans "a most powerful address on the subject of lynching and the race problem."

The fraternity has also been criticized for identification with the Confederacy and other forms of racism. KA's Maryland chapter pioneered an annual racially degrading blackface tradition known as the Cotton Pickers' Minstrel, which only ceased in 1966. In November 2002, the Zeta Psi and Kappa Alpha Order chapters at the University of Virginia were suspended and subsequently cleared after the fraternities held a Halloween party where a few guests were photographed wearing blackface and dressed up as Uncle Sam and Venus and Serena Williams.

In 2009, Kappa Alpha Order at the University of Alabama was criticized for wearing Confederate uniforms for an Old South Parade that passed by an African-American sorority house celebrating its 35th anniversary. The organization apologized for any offense that might have been caused. Kappa Alpha Order on other campuses, including Auburn, Centenary College, Mississippi State University, and the University of Georgia, had already ceased to wear Confederate uniforms in public following complaints from students. The national organization banned the wearing of Confederate uniforms to its "Old South" parades in 2010, although video from 2012 showed the uniforms still being worn. Kappa Alpha order further outlawed the name "Old South" from being used for social events in 2013.

In 2011, the chapter at Georgetown College was suspended by the national office of the fraternity after several members allegedly shouted racial slurs at a minority student on campus during an event in which members ran through campus in their boxer shorts and shouted in front of women's dormitories, though no one willing to testify to this incident proved willing to step forward in the subsequent days. The national office also issued a public apology on behalf of the chapter. An African-American student who unsuccessfully demanded that the chapter take down a Confederate flag in the aftermath of the incident was suspended for brandishing a toy gun. In 2020, the chapter was suspended for a minimum of four years for "racial prejudice, gender discrimination, misogyny, and threatening behavior".

In April 2016, the fraternity's Tulane University chapter in New Orleans, Louisiana, constructed a sand-bag wall around its house that contained spray-painted slogans about Republican presidential candidate Donald Trump's proposal to build a wall between the U.S. and Mexico. The chapter said that the wall had been built for an annual "capture the flag" game and that the pro-Trump slogans were satirical and not in support of the candidate or his message. Some students protested that the wall was offensive and anti-immigrant or anti-Latino. The wall was later forcefully dismantled, allegedly in part by members of the Tulane football team.

Edmondson notes that there is a glaring historical legacy between KA's history of devotion to protecting white womanhood and a 2019 incident in which three members of its University of Mississippi chapter were suspended after they posted a photo on an Instagram account showing them posing with guns next to a bullet-riddled sign memorializing Emmett Till. Till, a 14-year-old African-American youth from Chicago, was brutally lynched in Mississippi in 1955 for allegedly offending Carolyn Bryant, a white woman. The local U.S. Attorney said that the incident regarding the Till memorial had been referred for further investigation to the Civil Rights Division of the Department of Justice. The students were suspended by the fraternity but were not charged with criminal activity. and withdrew from the university, but they were not charged with a hate crime.

=== Other misconduct ===
In 1980, several students at Vanderbilt University including Graham Matthews, an African-American graduate student in the divinity school, decided to hold Nat Turner Day to protest the fraternity's celebration of Old South Day, when KA brothers dressed as CSA personnel. The university administrators sided with KA, banned Nat Turner Day, and let KA parade in their Confederate costumes. Michael Patton, now a philosophy professor at the University of Montevallo, "put on a cap with antlers"; he was called a homophobic slur and beaten up by the KA chapter.

In 1997, a former pledge at Texas A&M University had to have a testicle surgically removed due to a fraternity member giving him a "super wedgie." This same year, a pet goat was shot and killed with a gun in front of pledges at the fraternity's chapter house. One fraternity member was indicted for the incident.

In 2008, the fraternity chapter at Midwestern State University was suspended for three years after a pledge almost died due to alcohol poisoning under the fraternity's supervision.

In 2011, an investigation was started after a fraternity member fired a shotgun inside the University of Texas at Austin's chapter house. Following claims by the fraternity that the chapter had hazed pledges, hired adult performers for multiple live sex shows, and broken other fraternity rules, the fraternity suspended the chapter for one year. The chapter refuted the hazing allegation as minor and unsupported by evidence and broke ties with the national organization, forming a new fraternity Texas Omicron. Kappa Alpha Order then sued Texas Omicron, unsuccessfully, for dues and other monies, as well as furnishings from the chapter house.

In 2015, Jonathan Ford, the son of Alabama State Representative Craig Ford and a former football recruit at Birmingham-Southern College, sued the fraternity for hazing and injuries he says he sustained while pledging which resulted in his football career ending prematurely.

In 2016, the chapter at the University of Richmond was suspended after a strongly sexist and offensive email sent by the fraternity was reported to the university.

In 2016, the chapter at the University of Missouri was placed on suspension and investigation after a freshman pledging was hospitalized due to a hazing incident that involved drinking excessive amounts of alcohol with the purported purpose of somehow validating his manhood.

In 2016, the fraternity chapter at the College of Charleston was closed after the chapter president and other members were arrested for being involved in a multi-million dollar off-campus drug ring.

In 2017, the fraternity chapter at Southern Methodist University was suspended for four years and members living in the chapter house were forced to evacuate the premises for hazing pledges in the spring. The hazing included, according to the university: "paddling; servitude required of new members; forcing new members to consume alcohol; forcing new members to participate in calisthenics; forcing new members to consume food items such as jalapeños, habaneros, red onions, and milk until vomiting was induced; forcing new members to wear clothing soiled with vomit; sleep deprivation; 'underground membership.'"

In 2020, the fraternity chapter at Furman University was suspended for four years following an incident involving an unapproved off-campus party during the height of the COVID-19 pandemic. Nearly 60% of attendees subsequently tested positive for COVID-19. The chapter had previously been subject to disciplinary probation for a misconduct incident in 2019.

== See also ==
- List of social fraternities and sororities
