= Robert Huntley =

American university president

Robert E. R. Huntley (né Robert Edward Royall Huntley; 1929 – December 10, 2015) was an American attorney, businessman, retired law professor, and former president of Washington and Lee University.

He graduated from Washington and Lee in 1950 and its law school in 1957. He obtained a master's degree in law from Harvard University in 1962. He joined the law faculty of Washington and Lee in 1958, and served as its dean from 1967 to 1968. In 1968 he was named president of the university, a post he held for 15 years.

He practiced law with the Richmond, Virginia, law firm of Hunton & Williams from 1988 until his retirement in 1995. He also served as chairman, president and chief executive officer of Best Products. He also served on the board of directors of Altria Group.

== Recognition ==
Washington and Lee established the endowed Robert E. R. Huntley Professorship in Law in 1988.

The building housing the Williams School of Commerce, Economics, and Politics at Washington and Lee was named Huntley Hall in 2004 in his honor.
