= List of Union-Philanthropic Society members =

The Union-Philanthropic Society is a college literary and debating society at Hampden–Sydney College in Hampden Sydney, Virginia. It was formed by the merger of the Union Literary Society and the Philanthropic Literary Society in 1928. The society has both collegiate and honorary members. Following are some of its notable members.

== Collegiate members ==
| Name | Society membership and year | Notability | Ref. |
|---|---|---|---|
| James Waddel Alexander | | Presbyterian minister and theologian | |
| Thomas Salem Bocock | Philanthropic, 1838 | United States House of Representatives and Speaker of the Confederate House of Representatives | |
| Alexander Lee Bondurant | Philanthropic, 1884 | Superintendent of the Mississippi Board of Education and professor at the University of Mississippi | |
| John Luster Brinkley | Union-Philanthropic, 1959 | Professor of classics and historian at Hampden–Sydney College | |
| Joseph Carrington Cabell | Union, 1796 | Co-founder of the University of Virginia | |
| Robert Lewis Dabney | Philanthropic, 1840 | Christian theologian, biographer, and chief of staff to General Thomas J. "Stonewall" Jackson | |
| John Early | | Methodist Bishop who helped found Randolph–Macon College | |
| Powhatan Ellis | Union, 1816 | United States Senator, justice of the Supreme Court of Mississippi, United States district judge, and Charge d'affaires to Mexico | |
| John Floyd | Union,1797 | Governor of Virginia | |
| Hugh A. Garland | Philanthropic, 1825 | United States House of Representatives, Clerk of the United States House of Representatives, Greek professor | |
| Landon C. Garland | Philanthropic, 1829 | President of Randolph–Macon College, president of University of Alabama, and chancellor of Vanderbilt University | |
| William Henry Harrison | Union, 1790 | President of the United States | |
| Edward Henry | Union, 1793 | lawyer and son of Patrick Henry | |
| Andrew Hunter | Union, 1822) | Commonwealth Attorney who prosecuted John Brown, Confederate State Congress, member of the staff of General Robert E. Lee | |
| Thomas Watkins Ligon | Union, 1830 | Governor of Maryland and United States House of Representatives | |
| Richard A. McIlwaine | Philanthropic, 1853 | President of Hampden–Sydney College and minister | |
| Philip Watkins McKinney | Philanthropic, 1851 | Governor of Virginia | |
| John Peter Mettauer | Philanthropic, 1811 | Surgeon and founder of the Randolph-Macon Medical School | |
| William Ballard Preston | Philanthropic, 1824 | United States House of Representatives, United States Secretary of the Navy | |
| Sterling Price | Philanthropic, 1830 | United States House of Representatives, Governor of Missouri, and Major General in the Confederate States Army | |
| Roger Atkinson Pryor | Union, 1846 | United States House of Representatives, Associate Justice of the New York Supreme Court, Confederate States House of Representatives, Brigadier General in the Confederate State Army, and Diplomat to Greece | |
| William Cabell Rives | Philanthropic, 1811 | United States House of Representatives, United States Senate, Confederate States House of Representatives, and U.S. Minister to France | |
| Francis August Schaeffer | Union-Philanthropic, 1935 | Presbyterian pastor, evangelical theologian, and philosopher | |
| John W. Stevenson | Union, 1832 | Governor of Kentucky | |

== Honorary members ==
| Name | Society membership and year | Notability | Ref. |
|---|---|---|---|
| Archibald Alexander | Hon. Union, 1800 | President of Hampden–Sydney College and founder of Princeton Theological Seminary | |
| Mrs. P. T. Atkinson | Hon. Union-Philanthropic, 1968 | Founder of the Esther Thomas Atkinson Museum of Hampden–Sydney College | |
| P. G. T. Beauregard | Hon. Philanthropic, 1861 | Major-General of the Confederate States Army | |
| James Buchanan | Hon. Philanthropic, 1848 | United States Senator and President of the United States | |
| John C. Calhoun | Hon. Union, 1834 | United States Senator and Vice President of the United States | |
| Henry Clay | Hon. Union, 1842 | United States Senator and presidential candidate | |
| Jefferson Davis | Hon. Philanthropic, 1854 | United States Senator, United States Secretary of War, and President of the Confederate States of America | |
| Stephen A. Douglas | Hon. Philanthropic, 1853 | United States Senator and 1860 Democratic nominee for President | |
| Millard Fillmore | Hon. | President of the United States | |
| Anita Garland | Hon. Union-Philanthropic | Dean of Admissions of Hampden–Sydney College | |
| Basil Lanneau Gildersleeve | Hon. | Classical scholar and author | |
| Patrick Henry | Hon. Union, 1794 | Founding Father of the United States, Governor of Virginia, and founding trustee of Hampden–Sydney College | |
| John Johns | Hon. | Episcopal Bishop and president of College of William & Mary | |
| Robert E. Lee | Hon. Philanthropic, 1861 | Commander-in-Chief of the Army of Northern Virginia and president of Washington College (later Washington and Lee University) | |
| Henry Wadsworth Longfellow | Hon. Philanthropic, 1854 | Poet and professor of Greek at Harvard University | |
| Louis Philippe I | Hon. Philanthropic, 1848 | King of France | |
| James Madison | Hon. | President of the United States | |
| Thomas P. O’Neill | Hon. Union-Philanthropic, 1986 | Speaker of the United States House of Representatives | |
| Franklin Pierce | Hon. Philanthropic, 1853 | President of the United States | |
| Edgar Allan Poe | Hon. Philanthropic, 1830 | Author and editor of the Southern Literary Messenger | |
| Samuel Stanhope Smith | Hon. Union, 1790 | President of Princeton University and the first President of Hampden–Sydney College | |
| Adlai Stevenson | Hon. Union-Philanthropic, 1952 | Governor of Illinois and 1952 Democratic Party candidate for president | |
| William Makepeace Thackeray | Hon. Philanthropic, 1854 | novelist | |
| John Tyler | Hon. Philanthropic, 1830 | President of the United States, Vice President of the United States, and Confederate House of Representatives | |
| George F. Will | Hon. Union-Philanthropic, 1986 | The Washington Post columnist and political commentator for NBC News and MSNBC | |
| Samuel Vaughan Wilson | Hon. Union-Philanthropic, 1982 | Lieutenant general in the United States Army, Deputy Director of the Central Intelligence Agency, and President of Hampden–Sydney College | |
