= S. B. Wilson =

President of Hampden–Sydney College
- Preceded by: Patrick J. Sparrow
- Succeeded by: F. S. Sampson (Acting)

Personal details
- Born: March 17, 1783 Crowders, North Carolina, US
- Died: August 1, 1869 (aged 86) Hampden Sydney, Virginia, US
- Spouse: Elizabeth Hanna Wilson
- Children: Mary Blain Wilson; Samuel Owen Wilson; Martha Hanna Wilson; John Mark Wilson; Eliza Chur Gordon; James Matthew Wilson
- Education: D.D. Princeton University
- Profession: Theologian

Samuel B. Wilson (born Samuel Wilson) (March 17, 1783 – August 1, 1869) was a Virginia theologian and professor. He served a brief period as acting President of Hampden–Sydney College in 1847.

== Biography ==
Wilson was born in Crowders, North Carolina in 1783. Wilson was a professor at the Union Theological Seminary now (Union Presbyterian Seminary) in Hampden Sydney, Virginia from November 1841 to August 1869. In 1847, Wilson accepted the role as Acting President of Hampden–Sydney College, a position he held for three months before being replaced by F. S. Sampson.

Academic offices
Preceded by Patrick J. Sparrow	President of Hampden–Sydney College; 1847	Succeeded by F. S. Sampson
