= WWHS-FM =

Radio station at Hampden-Sydney College (1972–2014)

- Hampden Sydney, Virginia; United States
- Broadcast area: Hampden Sydney, Virginia
- Frequency: 92.1 MHz

Ownership
- Owner: Hampden-Sydney College

History
- First air date: 1972
- Last air date: September 29, 2014
- Call sign meaning: Hampden-Sydney

Technical information
- Facility ID: 25905
- Class: D
- ERP: 10 watts
- HAAT: 66 meters (217 ft)
- Transmitter coordinates: 37°14′23.0″N 78°27′48.0″W

WWHS-FM was a variety formatted broadcast radio station, which was licensed to and served Hampden Sydney, Virginia. WWHS-FM was owned and operated by Hampden-Sydney College.

== Programming ==
WWHS broadcast student created programming from its studios in Hampden Sydney. WWHS retransmitted programming from World Radio Network at times when the station did not air local programming.

== Sign-off ==
WWHS-FM signed off and turned in its license on September 29, 2014.
