= Jonathan P. Cushing =

Jonathan Peter Cushing
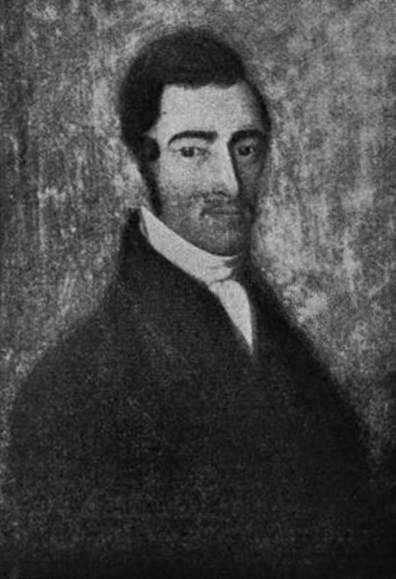

5th President of Hampden–Sydney College
- In office September 1821 – 1835
- Preceded by: Moses Hoge
- Succeeded by: George A. Baxter (Acting)

Personal details
- Born: March 12, 1793 Rochester, New Hampshire
- Died: April 25, 1835 (aged 42) Raleigh, North Carolina
- Education: B.A. Dartmouth College
- Profession: Theologian

Jonathan Peter Cushing (March 12, 1793 – April 25, 1835) was the fifth president of Hampden–Sydney College.

== Biography ==
Jonathan Cushing born to Peter and Hannah Cushing in Rochester, New Hampshire, in 1793. He graduated from Dartmouth College in 1817, and soon after traveled south. While in Richmond he agreed to temporarily take the place of a sick tutor at Hampden–Sydney College. He was soon made a professor, and when President Dr. Moses Hoge died in 1820 Cushing succeeded him in the presidency. With his accession ended the formative period of the institution, which now began its rapid growth into the proper functions and domain of a college. Cushing secured an endowment and built the present college edifice and the president's residence.

Cushing became the essential organiser and founder and was elected as vice president of the Virginia Historical and Philosophical Society at its incorporation, with Chief Justice John Marshall as president. Dr. Cushing's health was shattered by an accidental discharge from an electric battery while he was experimenting before his class. He died April 25, 1835, in Raleigh, North Carolina.

Cushing Hall (originally known as New College) at Hampden–Sydney was built during his tenure and was subsequently named in his honor. It is the oldest four-story dormitory still in use in the United States.

President Cushing graduated an large number of famous men: William Ballard Preston (Secretary of the Navy under President Zachary Taylor), Dr. Thomas Atkinson (Episcopal Bishop of the Diocese of North Carolina), Hugh A. Garland (Virginia Delegate and Clerk of the U.S. House of Representatives), William A. Daniel (Justice of the Virginia Supreme Court), Congressman William M. Tredway, Landon C. Garland (President of Randolph–Macon College and Chancellor of Vanderbilt University), Jesse Burton Harrison, who was a vocal opponent of slavery as well as a historian. Maryland Governor Thomas W. Ligon, Dr. John Lycan Kirkpatrick (President of Davidson College), and Dr. John M. P. Atkinson (President of Hampden–Sydney College). During Cushing's presidency the Hampden-Sydney literary societies were established and prospered.

Academic offices
Preceded by Moses Hoge	President of Hampden–Sydney College; 1821 - 1835	Succeeded by George A. Baxter
