= John M. P. Atkinson =

Rev. John M. P. Atkinson
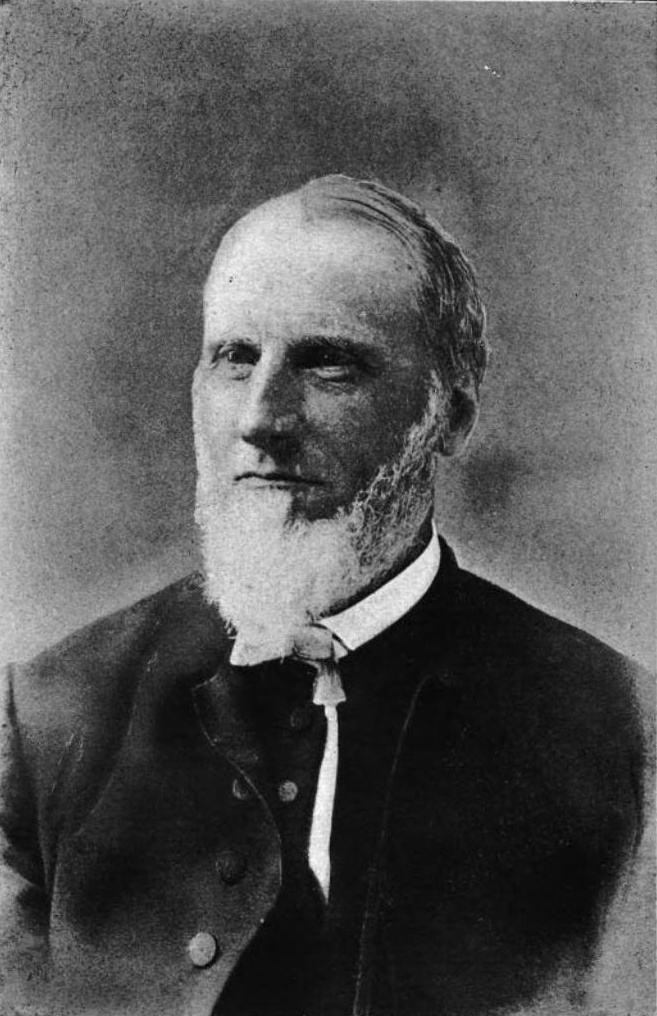

10th President of Hampden–Sydney College
- In office May 11, 1857 – June 1883
- Preceded by: Charles Martin (Acting)
- Succeeded by: Richard McIlwaine

Personal details
- Born: January 10, 1817 Mansfield, Dinwiddie, Virginia
- Died: August 28, 1883 (aged 66) Hampden Sydney, Virginia
- Spouse(s): Elizabeth Carr Harrison; Mary Biscoe Baldwin; Frances Peyton Stewart
- Children: Elizabeth Atkinson; Portia Atkinson Morrison; Peyton Harrison Atkinson
- Education: B.A. Hampden–Sydney College; Union Theological Seminary; Princeton Theological Seminary; D.D. Hampden–Sydney College
- Profession: Theologian, College President

John Mayo Pleasants Atkinson (January 10, 1817 – August 28, 1883) was the tenth President of Hampden–Sydney College from 1857 to 1883. He was the first alumnus of the college to be named its president and is the longest tenured president to date (26 years).

== Biography ==
=== Early life ===
John M. P. Atkinson was born on January 10, 1817, at the Mansfield Plantation in Dinwiddie County, Virginia. His father was Robert Atkinson and his mother, Mary Tabb (Mayo) Atkinson. He was educated at Hampden–Sydney College, from which he graduated in June 1835. He studied for the Presbyterian ministry for three years at Union Presbyterian Seminary and for two years at Princeton.

=== Career ===
==== Presbyterian ministry ====
Over the next sixteen years, Atkinson served ministerial duties — including two in Texas, seven in Warrenton, Virginia, and seven in Georgetown, Washington, D.C.

==== President of Hampden–Sydney College ====
In 1857, Atkinson was elected as the tenth president of Hampden–Sydney College. Dr. Atkinson is credited with managing to keep the college solvent while upholding disciplinary and academic standards. He was also tasked with the difficulties of reestablishing the college after the war. Beginning with four professors and one tutor, he brought the student roll from thirty-eight in 1865 to ninety-two in 1873. He was the first president to resign from his post as president of the college.

At the December 1863 convention, Atkinson was elected as the first president of the Educational Association of Virginia (now Virginia Education Association).

==== "The Hampden–Sydney Boys" ====
In 1861, near the beginning of the American Civil War, Atkinson established the "Hampden–Sydney Boys" and served as their captain, Company G, 20th Virginia Regiment. The troop was assigned to Col. John Pegram's Brigade, Gen. Robert Garnett's command and fought in early battles including both Big Bethel and Rich Mountain. At the battle of Rich Mountain, July 11, 1861, the Hampden–Sydney Boys were captured. After a nearly two-hour fight, the Union forces split the Confederate forces and the latter retreated from Laurel Hill, resulting in the capture of Col. John Pegram's command. The Hampden–Sydney Boys were paroled with the direction not take up arms again and that they return to their studies.

Boys, secession is dead in this region, go back to your college, take your books, and become wise men.

— General George B. McClellan

=== Personal life ===
He married (first) Elizabeth, daughter of Rev. Peyton Hawke; (second) Mary B. Baldwin; (third) Fanny, daughter of Hon. Alexander H. H. Stuart.

=== Death ===
He died on August 28, 1883.

Academic offices
Preceded by Charles Martin	President of Hampden–Sydney College; 1857–1883	Succeeded by Richard McIlwaine
