= W. H. Whiting Jr. =

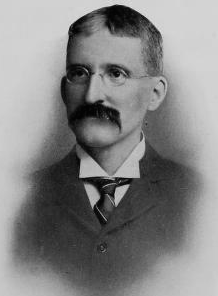

President of Hampden–Sydney College
- In office 1904–1905
- Preceded by: James R. Thornton (Acting)
- Succeeded by: J. H. C. Bagby (Acting)

President of Hampden–Sydney College
- In office 1908–1909
- Preceded by: James Gray McAllister
- Succeeded by: Henry T. Graham

Personal details
- Born: July 24, 1862 Millwood, Virginia
- Died: March 28, 1949 (aged 86) Hampden Sydney, Virginia
- Spouse: Sarah Ray Currie
- Education: B.A. Hampden–Sydney College; A.M. Hampden–Sydney College; L.L. D. Hampden–Sydney College
- Profession: Professor

William Henry Whiting Jr. (July 24, 1862 – March 28, 1949) was the acting president of Hampden–Sydney College from 1904 to 1905 and again from 1908 to 1909.

== Biography ==
Whiting was born in Clarke County, Virginia to William H. and Mary Jay (née Foote) Whiting in Millwood, Virginia. He was the valedictorian of his 1880 graduating class from Hampden–Sydney College, where he also earned his master's degree in 1882. He was an assistant at Prince Edward Academy in Worsham, Virginia from 1881 to 1886 and in 1888 he founded Clay Hill Academy in his hometown of Millwood — where he would stay for the next fourteen years.

Whiting was hired as a professor of Latin at Hampden–Sydney in 1902 and served in that role until his retirement in 1939.

Academic offices
Preceded by James R. Thornton	President of Hampden–Sydney College; 1904—1905	Succeeded by J. H. C. Bagby
Preceded by James Gray McAllister	President of Hampden–Sydney College; 1908—1909	Succeeded by Henry T. Graham
