= F. S. Sampson =

American theologian

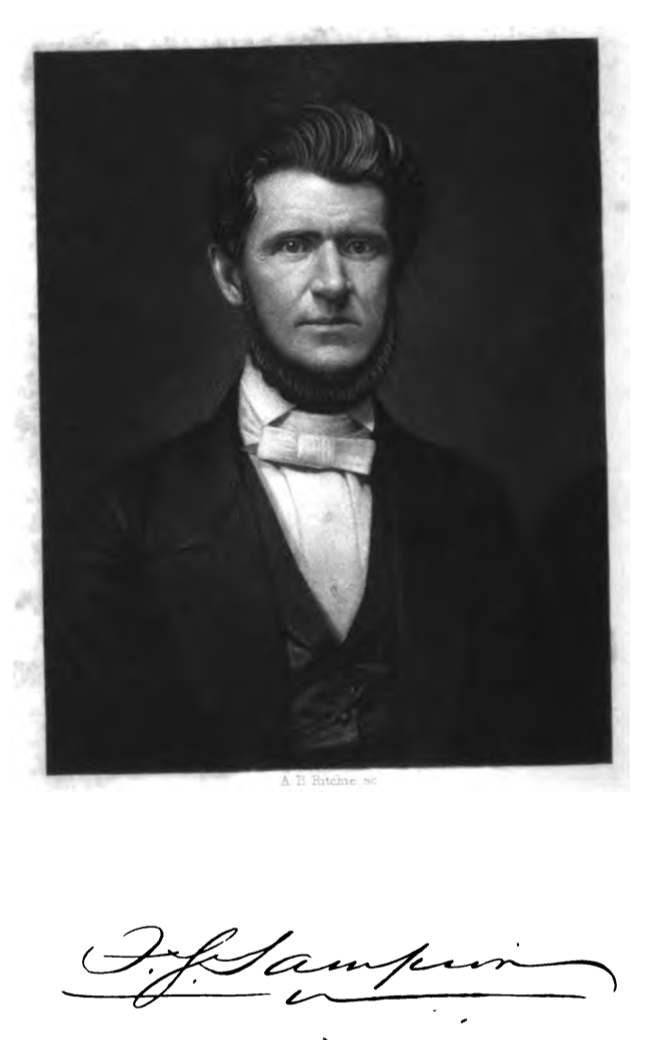

President of Hampden–Sydney College
- In office 1847 – September 1848
- Preceded by: S. B. Wilson (Acting)
- Succeeded by: Charles Martin (Acting)

Personal details
- Born: Francis Smith Sampson; November 1, 1814 Dover Mills, Virginia
- Died: April 9, 1854 (aged 39) Hampden Sydney, Virginia
- Education: M.A. University of Virginia; D.D. Hampden–Sydney College
- Profession: Theologian, Professor

Francis Smith Sampson (November 1, 1814 – April 9, 1854) was an American theologian who was acting President of Hampden–Sydney College from 1847 to 1848.

== Biography ==
Sampson was born in Dover Mills, Virginia to Richard Sampson, a respected agriculturist. He began studying theology in 1830 under his maternal uncle, Rev. Thornton Rogers of Albemarle. Sampson continued his studies at the University of Virginia, enrolling on September 10, 1831, and graduating with the rare, prestigious degree of M.A. in July 1836. In November of that year, Sampson enrolled at the Union Theological Seminary then in Hampden Sydney, Virginia where he became a teacher of Hebrew in 1838 and licensed by the East Hanover Presbytery in October 1839, and ordained by the same Presbytery in October 1941.

Sampson was appointed as the Acting President of Hampden–Sydney College at the end of 1847 and served in that role until September 1848 when Charles Martin replaced him. In July 1848, Sampson traveled to Europe to develop and practice his theology, returning in August 1849, having spent the year primarily at the University of Halle and University of Berlin. In October 1848, he was elected professor of oriental literature and languages in the Seminary and soon thereafter received his honorary Doctorate of Divinity from Hampden–Sydney College.

Academic offices
Preceded by S. B. Wilson	President of Hampden–Sydney College; 1847–1848	Succeeded by Charles Martin
