= Patrick J. Sparrow =

American theologian

8th President of Hampden–Sydney College
- In office November 12, 1845 – September 21, 1847
- Preceded by: William Maxwell
- Succeeded by: S. B. Wilson (Acting)

Personal details
- Born: 1802 Lincoln County, North Carolina
- Died: November 1867 (aged 64–65) Cahaba, Alabama
- Spouse(s): Mary Thomas (1826); Mary (1834–50); Mary J. Douglas (1857–1867)
- Children: Thomas E. Sparrow; James W. Sparrow; Robert H. M. Sparrow; John Alan Simpson Sparrow
- Education: D.D. Hampden–Sydney College
- Profession: Theologian

Patrick Jones Sparrow (1802 – November 10, 1867) was an American theologian who was the eighth President of Hampden–Sydney College from 1845 to 1847.

== Biography ==
Sparrow was born in 1802 in Lincoln County, North Carolina, and educated at Bethel Academy in South Carolina. After his formal education, in 1824, he became Principal of Lincolnton Male Academy, and was pastor of Presbyterian Church at that place. Sparrow continued studying languages and in 1826 secured a license to preach at Long Creek Church in Cleveland County. In 1836, Sparrow became an agent for Davidson College in securing funds, and in 1837 he was elected Professor of Languages at the college.

In 1841, he became pastor of the Presbyterian church in Hampden Sydney, Virginia (College Church). In 1840, he was elected as a trustee of Hampden–Sydney and shortly afterwards was elected president of the college. In July 1847, ten trustees (of the total 26) held a secret meeting and resolved to ask for Sparrow's resignation because of "evidence that [his] administration is not acceptable to the public on which we rely for patronage"; the nature of the evidence and of the alleged dissatisfaction is still not known to this day. At the regular September trustee meeting, the majority of the Board repudiated the request; however, Sparrow resigned effective immediately and spent the remainder of his life in obscure pastorates in Alabama.

Academic offices
Preceded by William Maxwell	President of Hampden–Sydney College; 1845–1847	Succeeded by S. B. Wilson
