= Larry Stimpert =

25th President of Hampden–Sydney College
- Incumbent
- Assumed office April 28, 2016
- Preceded by: Christopher B. Howard

Personal details
- Spouse: Lesley Stimpert
- Children: 2
- Education: Illinois Wesleyan University (BA); Columbia University (MBA); University of Illinois at Urbana–Champaign (PhD)

Larry Stimpert is an American academic administrator, currently serving as the 25th president of Hampden–Sydney College.

== Early life and education ==
Stimpert earned a Bachelor of Arts in Economics from Illinois Wesleyan University. He earned a master in business administration from the Columbia Business School of Columbia University, and a PhD from the University of Illinois at Urbana-Champaign.

== Career ==
Stimpert began his career at Norfolk Southern Corporation and the Chicago and North Western Transportation Company. He is the co-author of a leading text on strategic management entitled Strategic Thinking:Today's Business Imperative from Routledge. Stimpert was a professor of economics and business at Colorado College, followed by DePauw University, where he was also vice president for academic affairs. He has served as the 25th president of Hampden–Sydney College since 2016. In February 2018, he launched a $50-million-dollar fundraising campaign for the institution.

== Personal life ==
Stimpert and his wife, Lesley, have two children.

Academic offices
Preceded by Dennis G. Stevens as acting president	President of Hampden–Sydney College; 2016–present	Incumbent
