= James R. Thornton =

American academic (1853–1911)

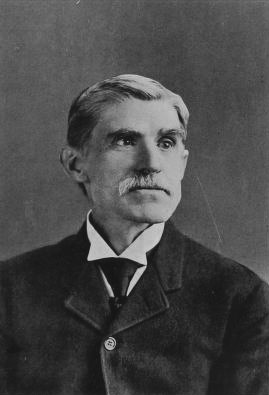
- James R. Thornton

President of Hampden–Sydney College
- Preceded by: Richard McIlwaine
- Succeeded by: W. H. Whiting, Jr. (Acting)
- In office July 1, 1904 – July 19, 1904

Personal details
- Born: February 22, 1853 Farmville, Virginia
- Died: July 27, 1911 (aged 58) Hampden Sydney, Virginia
- Spouse: Maria Edmunds
- Education: A.B. Hampden–Sydney College; M.A.
- Profession: Professor

James Riddle Thornton (February 22, 1853 – July 27, 1911) was an American academic, the acting president of Hampden–Sydney College for two and a half weeks in 1904.

== Biography ==
Thornton was born to Lieutenant Colonel John T. Thornton (CSA) and Martha Jane (née Riddle) Thornton in 1853 in Farmville, Virginia. James Thornton had four brothers, two of which had notable careers: William M. Thornton — Professor of Applied Mathematics, Chairman of the Faculty, and Dean of Engineering at the University of Virginia; and Harrison R. Thornton — a teacher and missionary in Cape Prince of Wales, Alaska who was killed in 1893, the only missionary to Alaska slain by a native Alaskan.

Thornton was the valedictorian, 1871 graduate of Hampden–Sydney College and also the principal of Prince Edward Academy in Worsham, Virginia from 1873 to 1881 and a professor of Latin at Central University (now Eastern Kentucky University) from 1881 to 1883.

Thornton later went on to be a professor of mathematics, an Instructor of Engineering, and the Treasurer at Hampden–Sydney College for a total of twenty-five years, starting in 1884. He was a brother of Phi Kappa Psi and was the "Frater in Residence" while a professor at the college. Known as "Uncle Jamie" to his students, Thornton was a beloved figure at the college and was presented with an award by the senior class of 1909 to honor Thornton's twenty-five years of service to the institution. He married his wife, Maria Edmunds, on June 22, 1910.

Thornton's childhood home known as "Thornton House" (built in 1756) was located in present-day Farmville, Virginia. After James's father, Colonel Thornton (also an alumnus of Hampden–Sydney) was killed in 1862 at the Battle of Sharpsburg, General Robert E. Lee made a brief condolence visit to the widow and children of Colonel Thornton at Thornton House on April 7, 1865 — in the midst of Lee's Retreat.

Academic offices
Preceded by Richard McIlwaine	President of Hampden–Sydney College; 1904	Succeeded by W. H. Whiting, Jr.
