= Cushing Hall =

Dormitory in Virginia, US

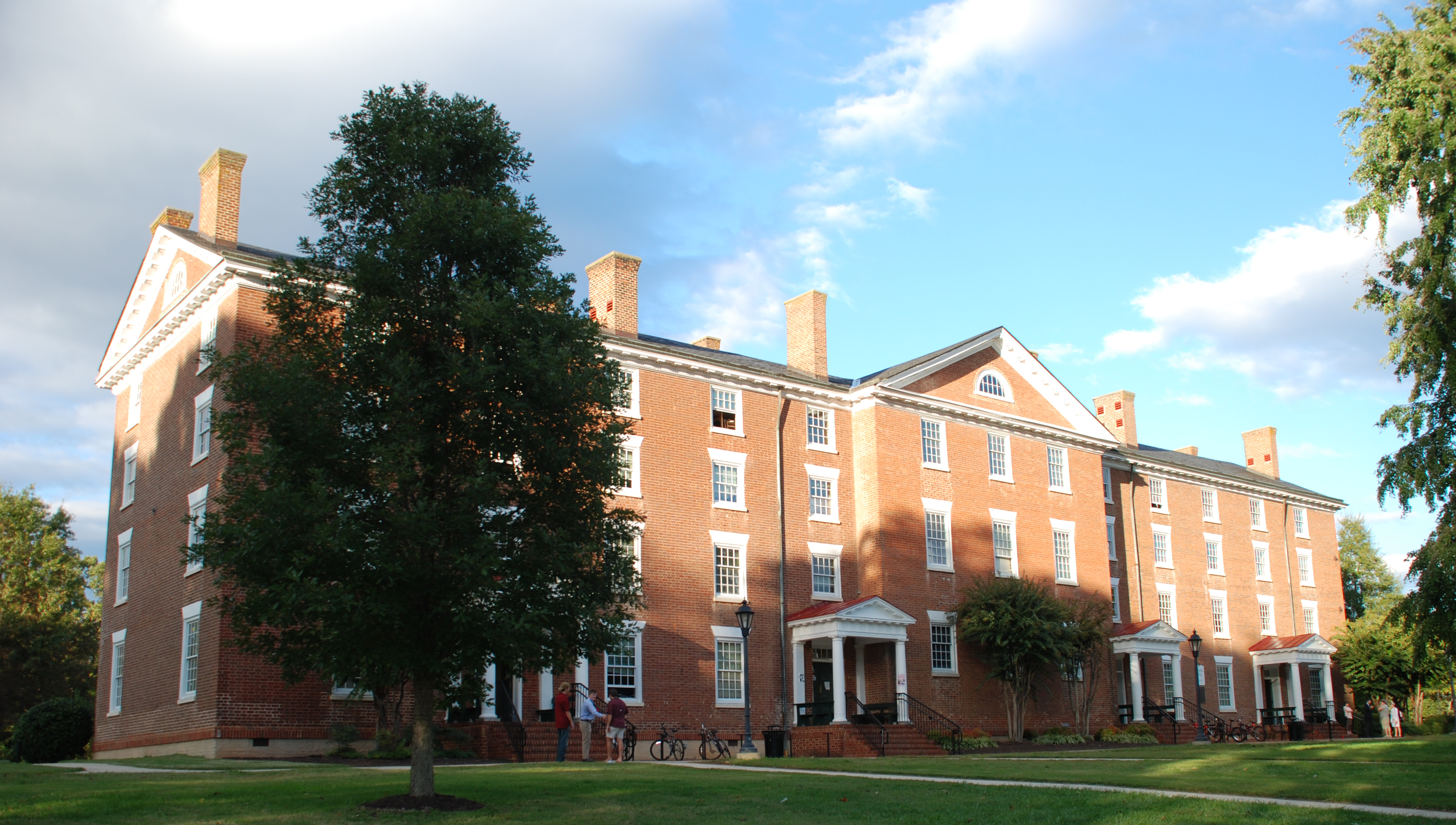
- Cushing Hall at Hampden–Sydney. Front facade, from the south.
- Interactive map of the Cushing Hall area
- Former names: New College, The College
- Etymology: Jonathan P. Cushing

General information
- Type: Dormitory
- Architectural style: Federal
- Location: Hampden Sydney, Virginia, United States
- Coordinates: 37.243811°N 78.460886°W
- Current tenants: Hampden–Sydney College
- Construction started: 1822
- Completed: 1833
- Cost: $45,000 (1833)
- Owner: Hampden–Sydney College

Technical details
- Floor count: 4

Design and construction
- Architects: William Phaup and Reuben Perry

Cushing Hall (1824) is a dormitory at Hampden–Sydney College in southside Virginia. Built in sections from 1822–1833, Cushing Hall is the oldest four story dormitory still in use in the United States. The building is listed in the Virginia Landmarks Register (1969) and on the National Register of Historic Places (1970) as a contributing property of Hampden–Sydney College Historic District. The structure is named after Jonathan P. Cushing, the fifth president of the college.

== History ==
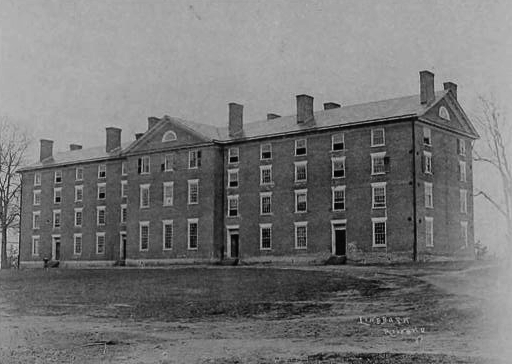
"New College" in 1895

Cushing Hall was designed by William Phaup and Reuben Perry in the Federal style of architecture. The east wing and center section were completed by 1824, and the west section by 1833. Cushing Hall almost entirely replaced all the older buildings on the campus and was called "the College" (or "New College") until the early 20th century, when it was named Cushing Hall in honor of the College's fifth president, Jonathan P. Cushing.

After almost a decade after being founded at the University of Virginia, Pi Kappa Alpha was "re-founded" as part of the Hampden–Sydney Convention, held in a student room of Cushing Hall in the late 1870s. The four delegates to the Hampden–Sydney Convention are referred to as the Junior Founders. It was at this convention that the fraternity defined itself as belonging to "the South." At the New Orleans Convention in 1909, Pi Kappa Alpha officially decided to declare itself a national organization.

The exterior has been restored and the interior modernized (first in 1910, more recently in 1998). Porches were added in 1910, along with a slate roof, replacing the original cedar shakes. The front of the building was originally the back, which faced the 18th century campus (which it also replaced).

Cushing Hall is the model for Venable Hall (which originally housed Hampden–Sydney's seminary school, now used primarily as a dormitory) and the Randolph–Macon Building in Boydton, Virginia.

== Functions ==
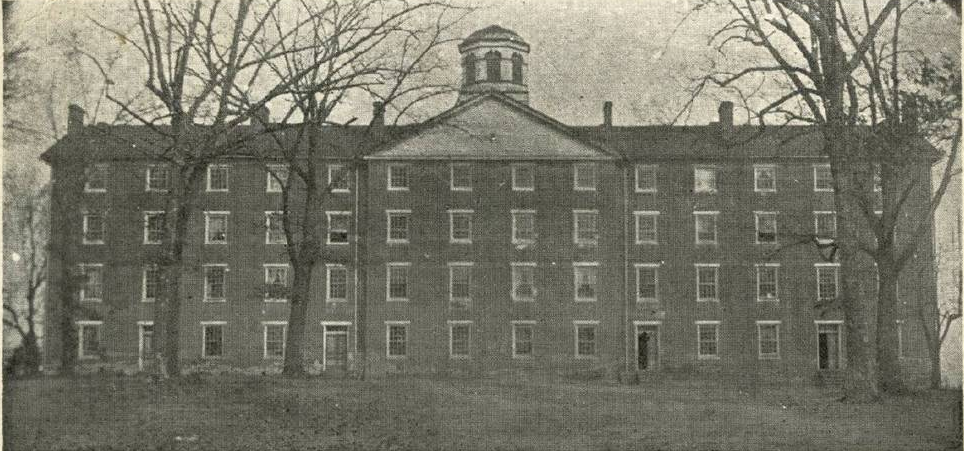
The Randolph–Macon Building in Boydton, Virginia, built in the 1830s, was designed after Cushing Hall. (The building was abandoned by the college in 1868 when it moved to Ashland due to financial reasons associated with Reconstruction.)

As with many 19th Century buildings in academia, Cushing Hall has been used for a myriad of functions throughout its lifetime. Since the 1820s, the building has been used as an auditorium, chapel, library, classrooms, and residence hall.
