= Walter M. Bortz III =

American university president

Walter Bortz

23rd President of Hampden–Sydney College
- In office 2000–2009
- Preceded by: Samuel V. Wilson
- Succeeded by: Christopher B. Howard

Personal details
- Spouse: Lorraine Bortz
- Children: Catherine Bortz; Walter M. Bortz IV
- Education: B.S., Bethany College; Ed.D., George Washington University

Walter Michael Bortz III (October 10, 1944 - November 18, 2023) was a former educator and higher education administrator. He served as the president of Hampden–Sydney College, located in Hampden Sydney, Virginia, from July 2000 until June 30, 2009.

== Biography ==
=== Education and degrees ===
Bortz received his bachelor's degree in biology at Bethany College in Bethany, West Virginia. He earned his doctorate in policy studies at George Washington University in Washington, D.C.

=== Career ===
Bortz held administrative positions at Bethany College, Texas Christian University, and East Carolina University. In 1985, he became the Vice President for Institutional Advancement at the University of Hartford in West Hartford, Connecticut. He was also Acting Vice President for Student Services and Executive Director of Admissions and Student Financial Assistance at Hartford. In 1989, he became the Vice President for Administrative and Information Services at George Washington University. In July 2000, Bortz was named President of Hampden–Sydney College. At Hampden–Sydney he spearheaded a significant building program that included the new Everett Stadium and the Bortz Library, which was named in his honor. He retired as President on June 30, 2009.

After his retirement, Dr. Bortz and his wife moved to South Carolina. They have two adult children.

== Honors and legacy ==
Bethany College awarded him an honorary Doctor of Laws degree.

On May 10, 2009 at the college's commencement ceremony, Tom Allen, Chairman of the Board of Trustees of Hampden–Sydney College, announced that the college library would be named the Walter M. Bortz III Library in honor of Dr. Bortz.

Academic offices
Preceded by Samuel V. Wilson	President of Hampden–Sydney College; 2000–2009	Succeeded by Christopher B. Howard
