= Charles Martin (educator) =

American educator (1817–1888)

President of Hampden–Sydney College
- In office 1848–1849
- Preceded by: F. S. Sampson (Acting)
- Succeeded by: Lewis W. Green

President of Hampden–Sydney College
- In office 1856–1857
- Preceded by: Albert L. Holladay
- Succeeded by: John M. P. Atkinson

Personal details
- Born: April 26, 1817 Vergennes, Vermont
- Died: March 10, 1888 (aged 70) Danville, Virginia
- Spouse: Margaret C. Watkins
- Children: Stanley W. Martin; Williams Venable Martin; Lydia Berkeley Martin
- Education: A.B. Jefferson College; LL.D. Hampden–Sydney; LL.D. Washington & Jefferson
- Profession: Professor

Charles Martin (April 26, 1817 – March 10, 1888) was an American educator who was twice an acting President of Hampden–Sydney College from 1848 to 1849 and again from 1856 to 1857.

== Biography ==
Charles Martin attended Jefferson College where he was a member of the Gamma chapter of the Beta Theta Pi fraternity. Martin graduated from Jefferson College in 1842 and spent the majority of his career as an educator. From 1847 until 1871 he was a professor of Languages — interrupted for two years by service in the Confederate States Army as adjutant, lieutenant and captain.

After he left Hampden–Sydney he taught at Virginia Tech, and, in 1876, was awarded an LL.D. degree by both Hampden–Sydney and Washington & Jefferson. In his later years he served as a government clerk and Clerk of a United States District Court.

Academic offices
Preceded by F. S. Sampson	President of Hampden–Sydney College; 1848—1849	Succeeded by Lewis W. Green
Preceded by Albert L. Holladay	President of Hampden–Sydney College; 1856—1857	Succeeded by John M. P. Atkinson
