= William Maxwell (educator) =

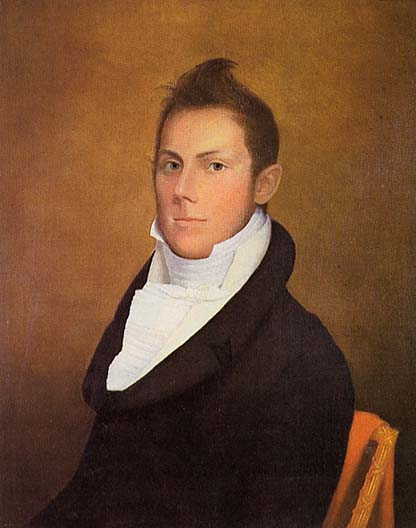
- portrait by Cephas Thompson, 1811

7th President of Hampden–Sydney College
- In office September 1838 – September 1844
- Preceded by: Daniel Lynn Carroll
- Succeeded by: Patrick J. Sparrow

Personal details
- Born: February 27, 1784 Norfolk, Virginia
- Died: January 10, 1857 (aged 72) James City County, Virginia
- Spouse: Mary F. Robertson
- Education: B.A. Yale University; LL.B. Yale University; LL.D. Hampden–Sydney College
- Profession: Attorney, Senator, Educator

William Maxwell (February 27, 1784 – January 10, 1857) was the seventh President of Hampden–Sydney College from 1838 to 1844.

== Biography ==
William Maxwell was born of English parents in Norfolk, Virginia in 1784. He graduated from Yale College in 1802, studied law in Richmond, and practiced in Norfolk. In 1830 he was elected to the lower house of the legislature, and was a Virginia State Senator, 1832–38. In 1836 he was elected to the Board of Hampden–Sydney College and given a Doctorate of Laws (only the third LL.D. the College had awarded). In 1838, Maxwell accepted the presidency of Hampden–Sydney College, and continued in that position until 1844, when he resigned, and engaged in law practice in Richmond, and for a time conducted a law school. In April, 1839, Maxwell married Mary F. Robertson, daughter of Robert Robertson and sister of Colonel Harrison Robertson of Charlottesville, Va.

He was active in resurrecting the Virginia Historical Society, which had been suspended, became its librarian, and for six years (1848-1853) was editor of its journal, the Virginia Historical Register and Literary Advertiser. He was an active member of the Bible and Colonization Society.

Academic offices
Preceded by Daniel Lynn Carroll	President of Hampden–Sydney College; 1838–1844	Succeeded by Patrick J. Sparrow
