= Daniel Lynn Carroll =

American theologian (1797–1851)

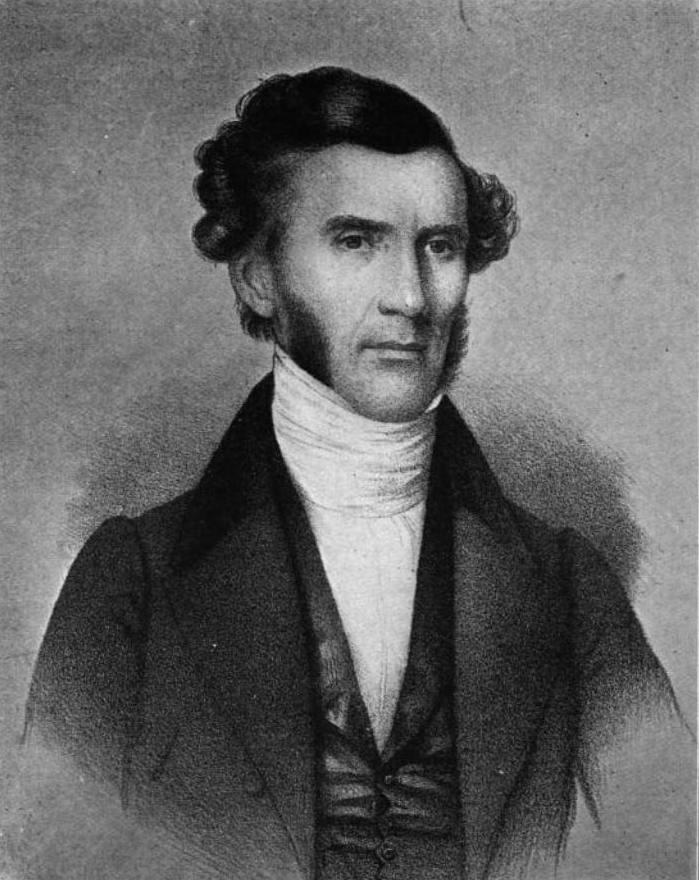

6th President of Hampden–Sydney College
- In office September, 1835 – September 1838
- Preceded by: George A. Baxter (Acting)
- Succeeded by: William Maxwell

Personal details
- Born: May 10, 1797 Fayette County, Pennsylvania
- Died: November 23, 1851 (aged 54) Philadelphia, Pennsylvania
- Education: Jefferson College; Princeton Theological Seminary; D.D. New York University
- Profession: Theologian

Daniel Lynn Carroll (May 10, 1797 – November 23, 1851) was the sixth President of Hampden–Sydney College from 1835 to 1838.

== Biography ==
Carroll was born in Fayette County, Pennsylvania in May, 1797 to poor Irish immigrant parents (his father was Roman Catholic). Carroll had been a farm-hand, iron-factory foreman, music teacher, and school teacher before entering Jefferson College (now Washington and Jefferson), where he went on to graduate in 1823 after only three years. He then enrolled at Princeton Theological Seminary and took the three-year curriculum, staying for another six months of study after graduation. Of Carroll, Archibald Alexander said that he was one of his finest students.

Seeking a call, he was installed as the pastor of a Congregational Church in Litchfield, Connecticut in October 1827. Then early in March, 1829, he accepted a call from the First Presbyterian Church in Brooklyn, New York though this pastorate ended in 1835, due to a severe throat ailment.

Almost immediately he was appointed to serve as the President of Hampden–Sydney College in Virginia. Carroll, unknown to most at the school, was elected to the position almost entirely on the testimony of one old friend who was among the College's trustees. His term here was relatively brief, with Rev. Carroll resigning over what was described as "some theological difficulties."

It was during Carroll's administration, on December 1, 1837, that the medical department of Hampden–Sydney was created, located in Richmond. The medical department became the Medical College of Virginia, now run by Virginia Commonwealth University.

Upon his resignation from Hampden–Sydney, Carroll accepted a call to the First Church of the Northern Liberties, a section of Philadelphia. Carroll remained at First Church until 1844, when declining health forced his retirement from that pulpit. After a brief tour of service for the Colonization Society, he died, in Philadelphia, at the age of fifty-four, on November 23, 1851.

Academic offices
Preceded by George A. Baxter	President of Hampden–Sydney College; 1835–1838	Succeeded by William Maxwell
