= Moses Hoge =

American theologian

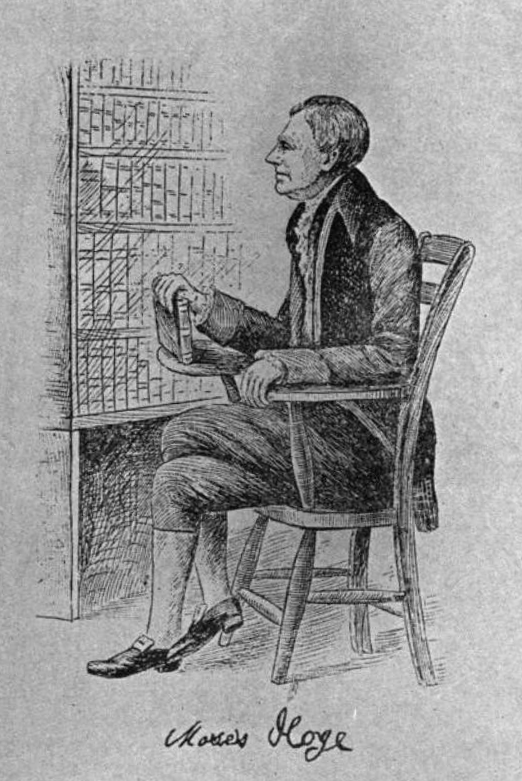

6th President of Hampden–Sydney College
- In office October 30, 1807 – July 5, 1820
- Preceded by: William S. Reid (Acting)
- Succeeded by: Jonathan P. Cushing

Personal details
- Born: February 15, 1752 Cedar Grove, Virginia, United States
- Died: July 5, 1820 (aged 68) Philadelphia, United States
- Spouse: Elizabeth Poage
- Children: James Hoge; John Blair Hoge; Samuel Davies Hoge; Thomas Poage Hoge
- Education: A.B. Washington & Lee; D.D. Princeton University
- Profession: Theologian

Moses Hoge (February 15, 1752 – July 5, 1820) was a Presbyterian minister as well as an educator and abolitionist. He served as the sixth President of Hampden–Sydney College.

== Early life ==
Moses Hoge was born in Cedar Grove, Virginia, to James and Nancy Hoge (née Griffiths) in 1752.

== Career ==
Hoge prepared for the ministry under the traditional apprentice-style system. He had been pastor of the Presbyterian Church of Shepherdstown, Virginia (now West Virginia), for twenty years and was famous as a preacher, theological teacher, and tract-writer when he was elected President of Hampden–Sydney College in June 1807. From the start, Hoge's main interest was in training ministers, and his efforts laid the groundwork for the establishment of what became Union Theological Seminary (now Union Presbyterian Seminary) at the south end of the college campus. Princeton gave both Hoge and former Hampden–Sydney president Archibald Alexander Doctorate of Divinity (D.D.) degrees in 1810.

In 1820, after attending the American Bible Society convention in New York, Hoge attended the General Assembly of the Presbyterian Church in Philadelphia. During his trip, Hoge visited Princeton to see Samuel Stanhope Smith, the first president of Hampden–Sydney, whose preaching had helped lead him to the ministry over forty years earlier. Hoge died on July 5 during his visit to Philadelphia.

Hoge was known for his powerful, moving sermons. John Randolph of Roanoke frequently went to hear Hoge preach. Randolph, in writing of him, said, "Doctor Hoge was the most eloquent man I ever heard in the pulpit or out of it." Hoge was instrumental in founding Virginia's only chapter of the American Colonization Society.

== Personal life ==
Hoge married Elizabeth Poage, August 23, 1783, daughter of John Poage of Staunton, Virginia – she was the mother of all of his children, and died June 18, 1802. He later married Susan Hunt (born Susannah Watkins), on October 25, 1803.

== Death and legacy ==
Hoge died on July 5, 1820. His third son, Samuel Davies Hoge, married Elizabeth Rice Lacy, daughter of Drury Lacy – the third president of Hampden–Sydney College.

Academic offices
Preceded by William S. Reid	President of Hampden–Sydney College; 1807—1820	Succeeded by Jonathan P. Cushing
