= Albert L. Holladay =

American minister and educator (1805–1856)

President of Hampden–Sydney College
- Preceded by: Lewis W. Green
- Succeeded by: Charles Martin (Acting)

Personal details
- Born: Albert Lewis Holladay; April 16, 1805
- Died: October 18, 1856 (aged 51)
- Education: University of Virginia; Union Theological Seminary
- Profession: Theologian; educator

Albert Lewis Holladay (April 16, 1805 – October 18, 1856) was an American Presbyterian minister and educator who was elected to the presidency of Hampden–Sydney College in 1856 but died before taking office.

== Early life ==
Albert Lewis Holladay was born on April 16, 1805, in Spotsylvania County, Virginia. He was educated at the University of Virginia.

== Career ==
Holladay taught at the University of Virginia and in Richmond. He then became a professor of ancient languages and president at Hampden–Sydney College. In 1833, he retired as a professor and left the presidency. He entered the Union Theological Seminary at Hampden–Sydney.

After graduating from the Seminary, Holladay spent eleven years as a missionary in Persia and studied eastern literature. He returned to Charlottesville after encountering unusual hardships and trials. He became a pastor in Charlottesville. In 1848, he became a principal at Charlottesville Female Academy in Charlottesville. He resigned from the role in 1851. He was in charge of South Plains Presbyterian Church in Albemarle County. Already ill when he was elected as president of Hampden–Sydney College in 1856, he never made it to the campus to take his position.

== Personal life ==
Holladay died on October 18, 1856, in Albemarle County.

Academic offices
Preceded by Lewis W. Green	President of Hampden–Sydney College; 1856	Succeeded by Charles Martin (educator)
