= William S. Reid =

President of Hampden–Sydney College
- Preceded by: Archibald Alexander
- Succeeded by: Moses Hoge

Personal details
- Born: April 21, 1778 West Nottingham, PA
- Died: June 21, 1853 (aged 75) Lynchburg, Virginia
- Spouse: Clementina Frances Venable
- Education: B.A. Princeton University; M.A. Hampden–Sydney
- Profession: Theologian

William Shields Reid (April 21, 1778 – June 21, 1853) was a vice president and the Acting President of Hampden–Sydney College in 1807.

== Biography ==
Reid was born in West Nottingham Township, Pennsylvania to Adam Reid and Martha Shields. He graduated from the College of New Jersey (now Princeton University) in 1802 and went on to teach at Georgetown University from 1802 to 1804. Studying under future Hampden–Sydney College president Dr. Moses Hoge, Reid was licensed and ordained about 1808. He was vice president and president of Hampden-Sydney from 1806 to 1807 while living in Lynchburg, Virginia. Reid founded and organized the First Church of Lynchburg in 1815 and died in Lynchburg in 1853.

== Personal life ==
William Reid married Clementina Frances Venable (June 6, 1782 – August 11, 1841) in 1807. A member of one of the First Families of Virginia, Venable was the daughter Samuel Woodson Venable and Mary Scott Carrington, and the granddaughter of Nathaniel Venable (member, House of Burgesses, the Virginia House of Delegates, and a State Senator). Clementina's father, Samuel, and uncle, Abraham Bedford Venable studied at Hampden–Sydney College and at Princeton College, and Abraham served in the U. S. House of Representatives and as a State Senator. Clementina's other two uncles, Richard N. Venable and William Lewis Venable, studied at Hampden-Sydney and Princeton respectively. Her family is the namesake of Venable Hall at Hampden–Sydney. William and Clementina Reid had a total of thirteen children.

Academic offices
Preceded by Archibald Alexander	President of Hampden–Sydney College; 1807	Succeeded by Moses Hoge
