= George A. Baxter =

American academic (1771–1841)

George Addison Baxter
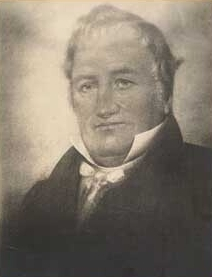

5th President of Washington & Lee University
- In office 1799–1829
- Preceded by: Samuel Legrand Campbell
- Succeeded by: Henry Ruffner

President of Hampden–Sydney College
- In office 1835–1835
- Preceded by: Jonathan P. Cushing
- Succeeded by: Daniel Lynn Carroll

Personal details
- Born: July 22, 1771 Rockingham County, Virginia
- Died: April 24, 1841 (aged 69)
- Education: Washington & Lee University; University of North Carolina
- Profession: Theologian, Educator

George Addison Baxter (July 22, 1771 – April 24, 1841) was an educator, American university administrator, theologian and author. He served as President of Washington and Lee University from 1799 to 1829 and Hampden–Sydney College from 1835 until his death.

== Early and family life ==
George Addison Baxter was born to George Baxter and Mary Love in the Shenandoah Valley of Virginia. He graduated from Liberty Hall Academy (renamed Washington College in 1813, now Washington and Lee University). In 1798 he married Annie C. Fleming (1777–1846), daughter of frontier patriot and former Virginia governor William Fleming.

== Career ==
George A. Baxter's Cemetery Monument on the campus of Hampden-Sydney College

Baxter was licensed to preach in the Presbyterian Church (USA) on 21 April 1797. He stayed active in ministry to supplement income as he turned to teaching. He left Principalship at New London Academy (Virginia) in 1798 to become Professor of Mathematics, Natural Philosophy and Astronomy at Liberty Hall. He then served as President of his alma mater, 1799–1829 in transitions as Liberty Hall was restyled Washington Academy and then Washington College. From 1832 he chaired Theology at Union Theological Seminary, Hampden–Sydney College at Prince Edward County, Virginia (now Union Presbyterian Seminary at Richmond, Virginia). From 1835 until his death, Baxter served as acting President of Hampden–Sydney.

Baxter graduated from Liberty Hall with an A.B. degree. In 1812, he received an honorary Doctorate of Divinity from the University of North Carolina at Chapel Hill.

He was a published author. His longest text may have been An Essay on the Abolition of Slavery, published at Richmond (1836). It argued slaves were better off in subjugation than they would be in freedom. It was response to heightened espousal for abolition, especially as promulgated by Brown University President Francis Wayland. Essays include A sermon, preached at Bethel, on the ordination of the Rev. William M'Pheters (1806), An address of the committee, appointed by the Bible Society of Lexington Virginia: to the people of Rockbridge County, soliciting their patronage to said society (1812), Sermon preached before the Presbytery of Lexington, at the installation of the Rev. Thomas Caldwell (1825), Essay on Baptism (1833), and Parity: the Scriptural order of the Christian ministry (1840). Inaugural address of the Rev. G.A. Baxter: on his induction into the Professorship of Christian Theology in Union Theological Seminary went into print in 1832.

== Death and legacy ==
Baxter died in 1841. He was interred at Union Presbyterian Seminary Cemetery, Prince Edward County, Virginia. One face of his obelisk is composed in Latin.

White devotes most of p. 275 to men of subsequent attainment who were at Washington College during Baxter's tenure. Trustees of Washington and Lee University in 1892 compiled death notices paying tribute to Baxter.

The family home, Baxter House near Edom, Virginia was listed on the National Register of Historic Places in 1973.

George A. Baxter Papers are among James G. Leyburn Library Special Collections at Washington and Lee University.

Academic offices
Preceded by Samuel Legrand Campbell	President of Washington and Lee University; 1799—1829	Succeeded by Henry Ruffner
Preceded by Jonathan P. Cushing	President of Hampden–Sydney College; 1835	Succeeded by Daniel Lynn Carroll
