= Hampden–Sydney College =

Men's college in Hampden Sydney, Virginia, US

- Former name: Hampden–Sidney College
- Motto: Huc venite iuvenes ut exeatis viri Γνώσεσθε τὴν αλήθειαν
- Motto in English: Latin: Come here as youths so you may leave as men Greek: Ye Shall Know the Truth (John 8:32)
- Type: Private liberal arts men's college
- Established: November 10, 1775 (250 years ago)
- Religious affiliation: Presbyterian Church (USA)
- Academic affiliations: APCU; Annapolis Group
- Endowment: $280.4 million (2025)
- President: Dr. Larry Stimpert
- Undergraduates: 946 (fall 2024)
- Location: Hampden Sydney, Virginia, U.S. 37°14′31″N 78°27′37″W
- Campus: Rural, 1,300 acres (530 ha)
- Colors: Garnet and gray
- Nickname: Tigers
- Sporting affiliations: NCAA Division III – ODAC
- Website: hsc.edu
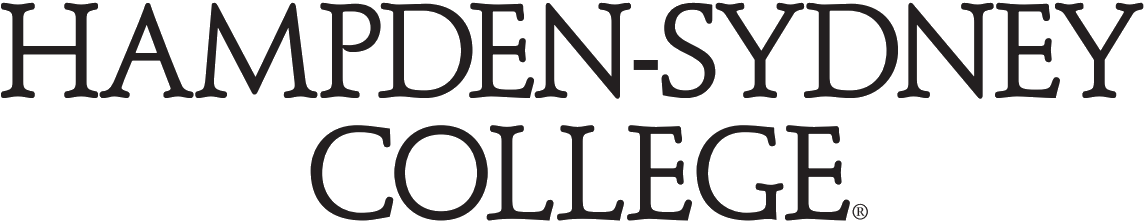

Hampden–Sydney College (H–SC) is a private liberal arts college for men in Hampden Sydney, Virginia, United States. Founded in 1775, it is the oldest privately chartered college in the Southern United States, the tenth-oldest college in the US, the last college founded before the American Declaration of Independence, and the oldest of the four-year, all-male liberal arts colleges remaining in the United States. Hampden–Sydney College is listed on the National Register of Historic Places and the Virginia Landmarks Register, and is affiliated with the Presbyterian Church (USA).

Hampden-Sydney academics are focused primarily on traditional liberal arts programs, and the college offers only bachelor's degrees. A participant in the U.S. Navy's V-12 Navy College Training Program during World War II, Hampden-Sydney established the Wilson Center for Leadership in the Public Interest in 1996 in order to offer specialized training for students seeking military or public service careers, and offers a U.S. Army ROTC program through its partnership with the University of Richmond.

Hampden-Sydney alumni have included eight state governors (four of those in Virginia), educators and businessmen, and numerous judges, businessmen, lawyers, and legislators throughout the United States.

== History ==
=== Founding and early years ===
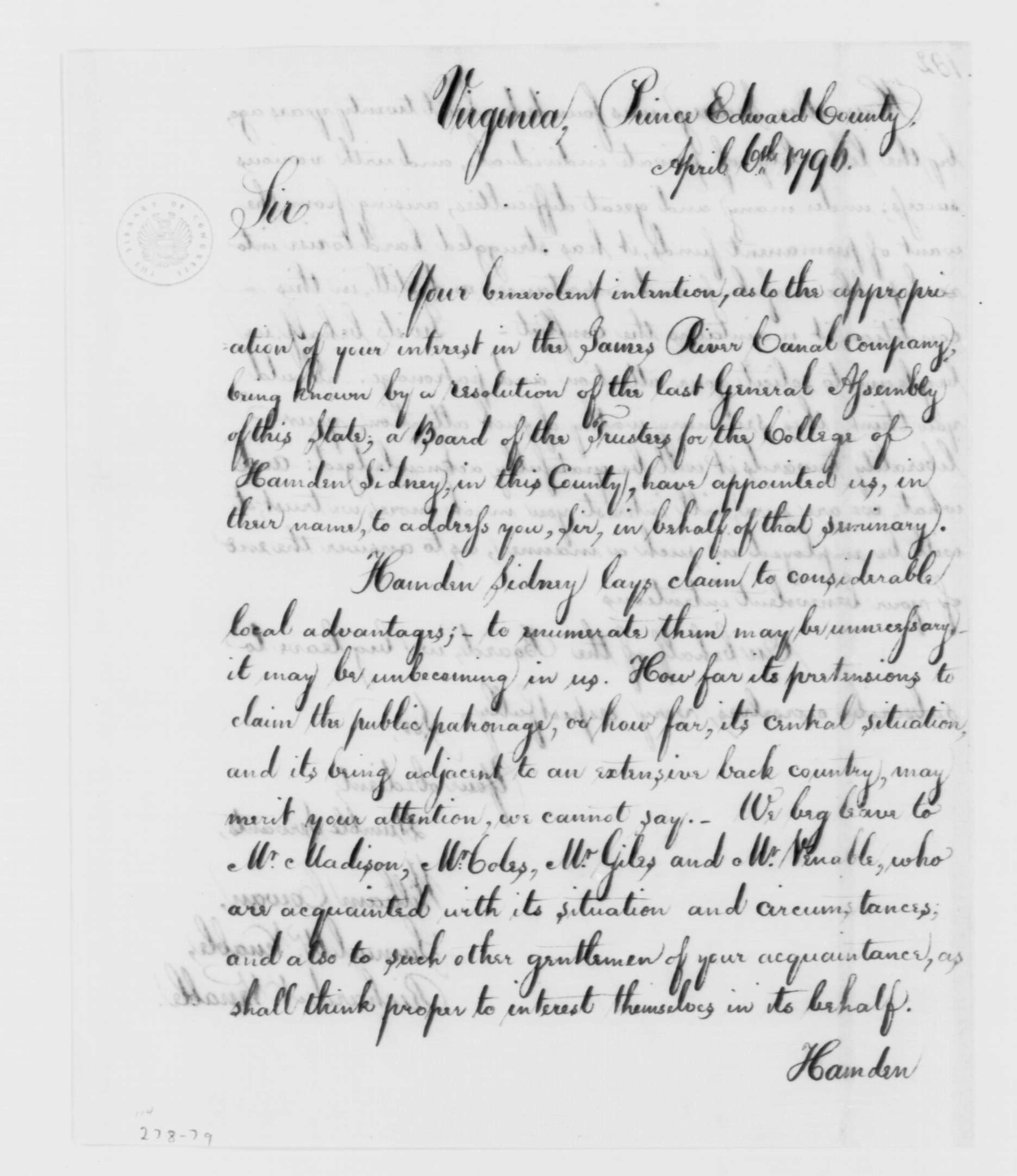
Letter from the board of Hampden–Sydney to George Washington, April 6, 1796

The college's founder and first president, Samuel Stanhope Smith, was born in Pequea, Pennsylvania. He graduated as a valedictorian from the College of New Jersey (now Princeton University) in 1769, and he went on to study theology and philosophy under John Witherspoon, whose daughter he married on June 28, 1775. In his mid-twenties, working as a missionary in Virginia, Smith persuaded the Hanover Presbytery to found a school east of the Blue Ridge, which he referred to in his advertisement of September 1, 1775, as "an Academy in Prince Edward ... distinguished by the Name of HAMPDEN–SIDNEY". The school, not then named, was always intended to be a college-level institution; later, in the same advertisement, Smith explicitly modeled its curriculum on that of the College of New Jersey. "Academy" was a technical term used for college-level schools not run by the established church.

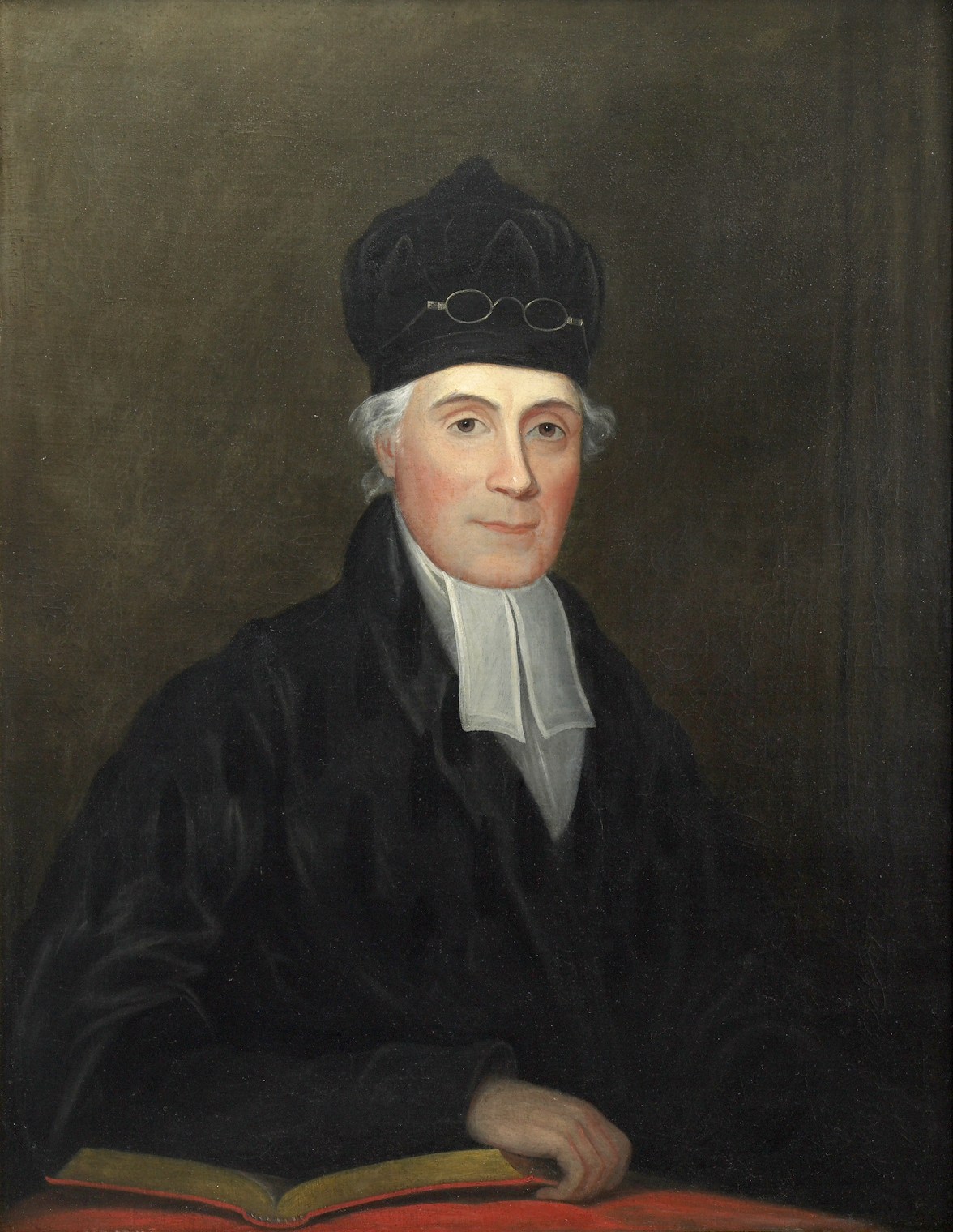
Samuel Stanhope Smith, the founding president

As the college history indicates on its website, "The first president, at the suggestion of Dr. John Witherspoon, the Scottish president of the College of New Jersey (now Princeton University), chose the name Hampden–Sydney to symbolize devotion to the principles of representative government and full civil and religious freedom which John Hampden (1594–1643) and Algernon Sydney (1622–1683) had outspokenly supported, and for which they had given their lives, in England's two great constitutional crises of the previous century. They were widely invoked as hero-martyrs by American colonial patriots, and their names immediately associated the College with the cause of independence championed by James Madison, Patrick Henry, and other less well-known but equally vigorous patriots who composed the College's first Board of Trustees."

Classes at Hampden–Sydney began in temporary wooden structures on November 10, 1775, on the eve of American Independence, moving into its three-story brick building early in 1776. The college has been in continuous operation since that date, operating under the British, Confederate, and United States flags. Classes have only been canceled seven times: for a Civil War skirmish on campus, for a hurricane that knocked a tree into a dormitory building, twice due to snowstorms, once for an outbreak of norovirus, briefly during the COVID-19 pandemic, and once for an ice storm in 2021 that left the campus without power. Since the college was founded before the proclamation of the Declaration of Independence on July 4, 1776, it was eligible for an official coat of arms and armorial bearings from the College of Arms of the Royal Household of the United Kingdom. Through gifts from the F. M. Kirby Foundation, Professor John Brinkley ('59), in whose honor the "achievement of arms" was given, liaised with Mr. John Brooke-Little, then the Richmond Herald, in designing the arms for the college. The Latin text of the "letters patent" conferring the arms is dated July 4, 1976; Mr. Brooke-Little—who, with the Queen's special permission, appeared in full herald's uniform—made the presentation on Yorktown Day, October 19, 1976, at the college.

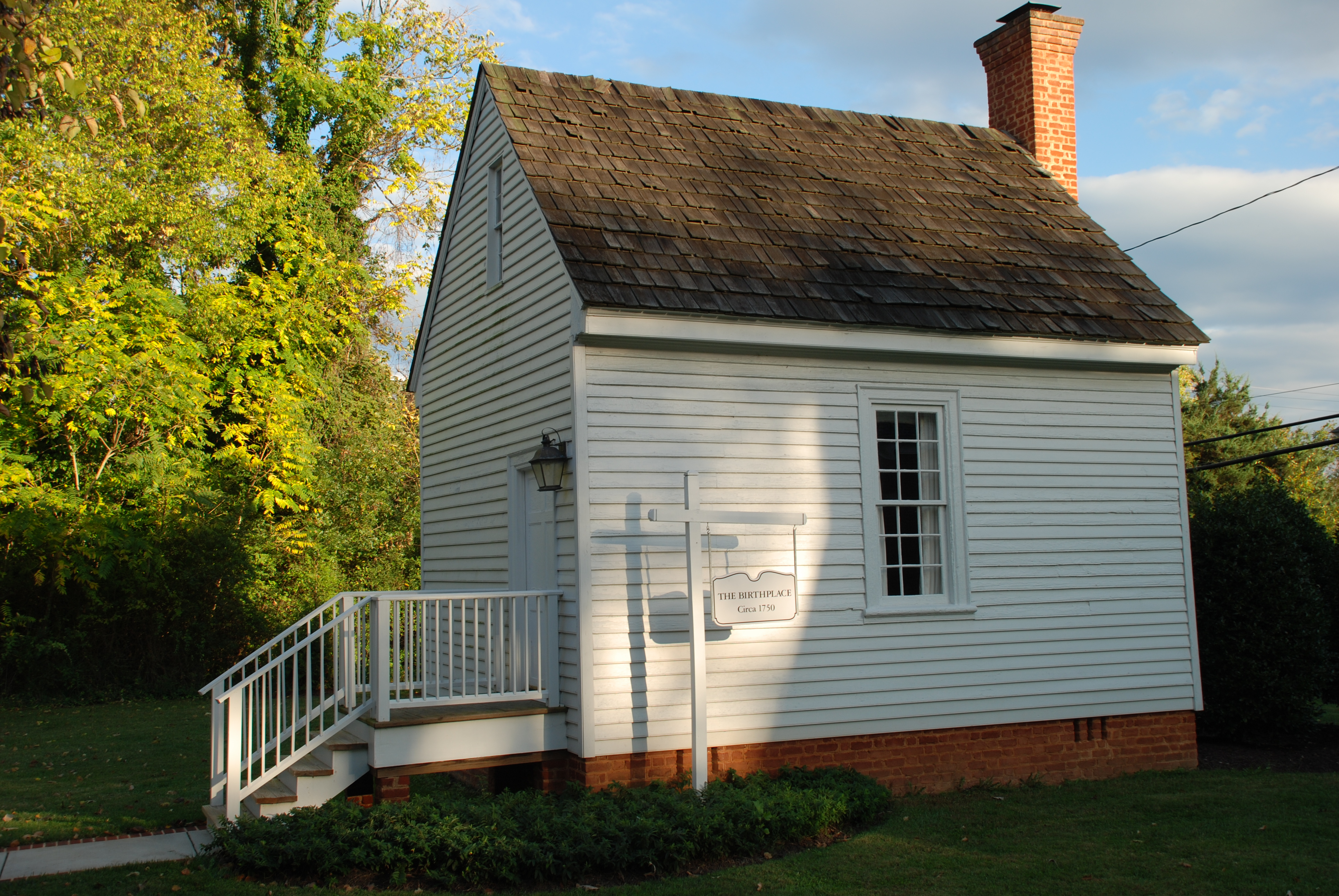
"The Birthplace" (circa 1750), outbuilding in which H–SC was founded at Slate Hill Plantation

Despite the problematic and financially strapped first years resulting from the Revolutionary War, the college survived with sufficient viability to be granted a charter by the Virginia General Assembly in 1783—the oldest private charter in the Southern United States. Patrick Henry, then Governor of Virginia, encouraged the passage of the charter and wrote into it an oath of allegiance to the new republic required of all professors.

Alumni of Princeton University founded the college. Patrick Henry, who did not attend college, and James Madison, a Princeton alumnus, were elected trustees in the founding period before classes began. Smith hired his brother, John Blair Smith, and two other recent Princeton graduates to teach. Samuel Stanhope Smith would later become president of Princeton University. John Blair Smith would become the second president of Hampden–Sydney and later the first president of Union College.

=== 19th century ===
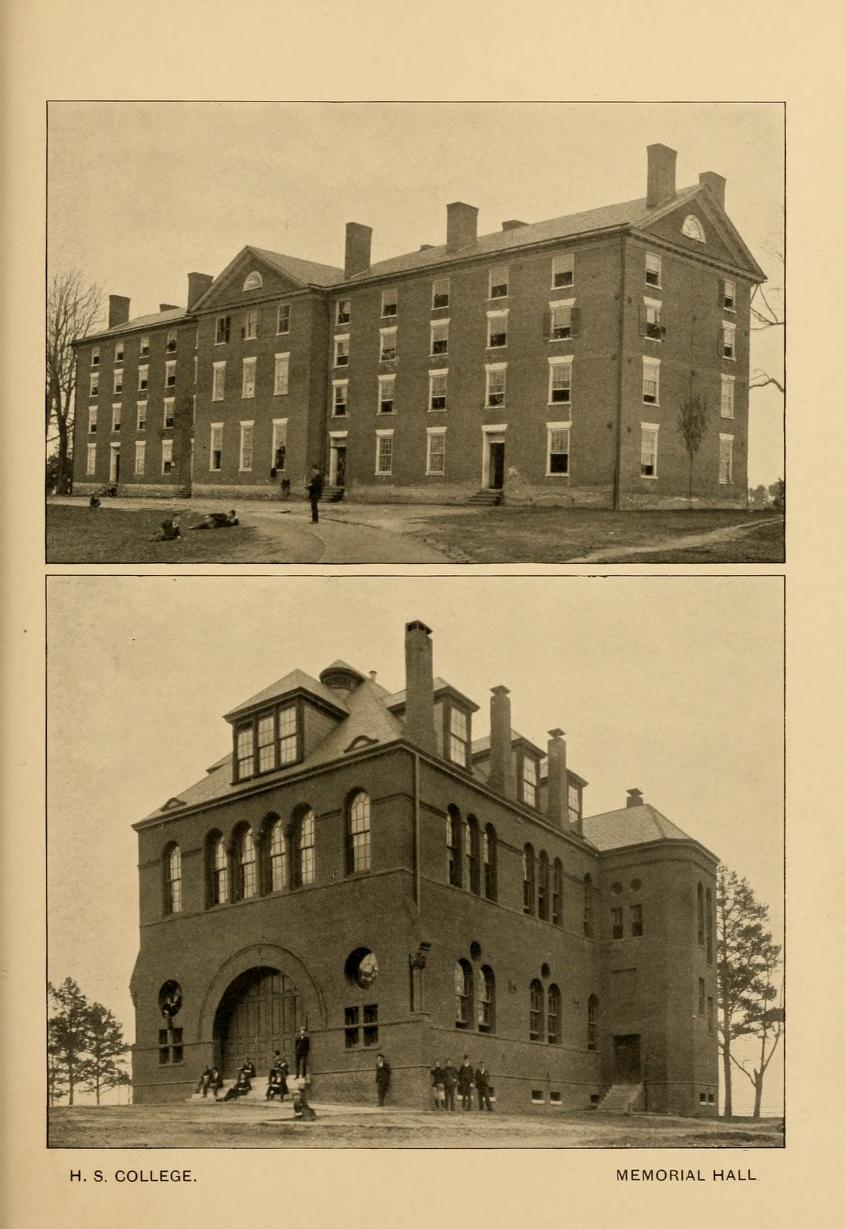
Cushing and Memorial Halls, 1894

Hampden–Sydney became a thriving college while located in southside Virginia, which led to expansion. In 1812, the Union Theological Seminary was founded at Hampden–Sydney College. The seminary was later moved to Richmond, Virginia and is currently the Union Presbyterian Seminary. In 1838, the medical department of Hampden–Sydney College was founded—the Medical College of Virginia, which is now the MCV Campus of Virginia Commonwealth University. Among the early nineteenth-century leaders were John Holt Rice, who founded the seminary, Jonathan P. Cushing, and Reverend James Marsh. In those years, the intellectual culture at HSC spanned from leading southern, anti-slavery writers like Jesse Burton Harrison, John Holt Rice, and Lucian Minor to leading proslavery writers, such as George A. Baxter and Landon Garland. During this time, the college constructed new buildings using Federal-style architecture with Georgian accents. This is the style of architecture still used on the campus.

At the onset of the American Civil War, Hampden–Sydney students formed a company in the Virginia Militia. The Hampden–Sydney students did not see much action but rather were "captured, and ... paroled by General George B. McClellan on the condition that they return to their studies".

=== 20th century ===
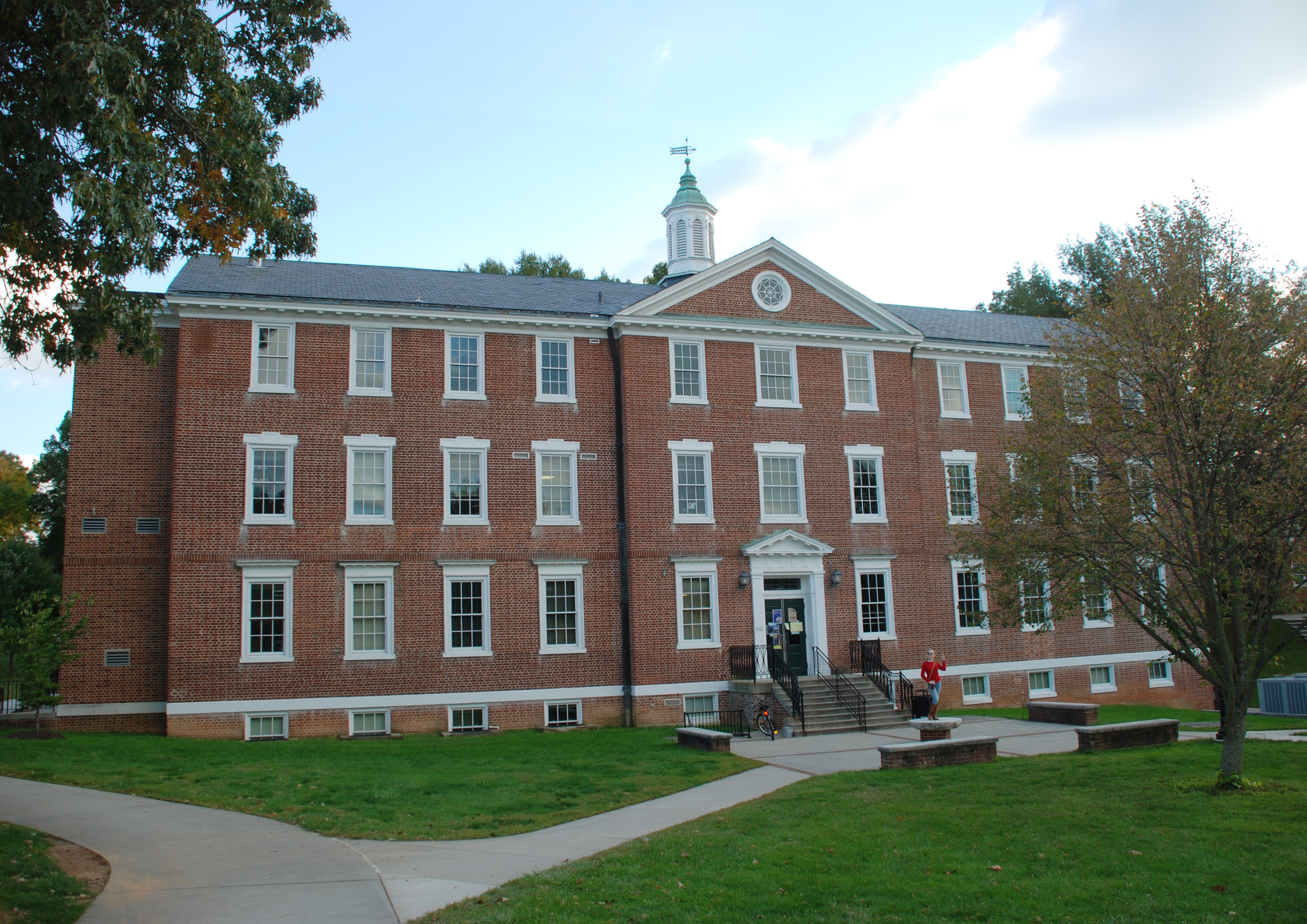
Bagby Hall at Hampden–Sydney

"Fame has come suddenly to Hampden–Sydney College," began a 1931 New York Times article titled, "Hampden-Sydney's High Scholastic Rank Achieved With Old-Fashioned Teaching." The article highlighted a study showing that of all U.S. colleges and universities, Hampden-Sydney had the highest percentage of living graduates listed in Who's Who.

During World War II, Hampden–Sydney College was one of 131 colleges and universities nationally that took part in the V-12 Navy College Training Program, which offered students a path to a commission. Under the Victory ship program, the SS Hampden-Sydney Victory was built at Bethlehem-Fairfield Shipyard in Baltimore, Maryland; her keel was laid down on 30 May 1945, and she was launched on 14 July 1945, and delivered for service on 22 August 1945. Brought into service too late to aid in the war effort she was built for, Hampden-Sydney Victory nonetheless served with the U.S. Merchant Marine until she was sold to the Republic of Turkey on 24 November 1947 .

The college has hosted a wide array of noteworthy musicians. Bruce Springsteen, the Temptations, Ben E. King, The Platters, The Lettermen, Dionne Warwick, the Allman Brothers, Dave Matthews Band, Widespread Panic, Bruce Hornsby, Pretty Lights, and Government Mule were among the popular visitors to Hampden–Sydney throughout the latter half of the twentieth century. But for tragic reasons, the most significant concert occurred on October 14, 1967, featuring the superstar duet of Marvin Gaye and Tammi Terrell. During their performance, 22-year-old Terrell collapsed into Gaye's arms. Terrell would later be diagnosed with a brain tumor and had eight unsuccessful surgeries before she died on March 16, 1970, at the age of 24.

On May 11, 1964, Attorney General Robert F. Kennedy visited Hampden–Sydney College to speak with students, and U.S. Vice President George H. W. Bush gave the commencement address on May 4, 1985 .

=== 21st century ===
As of 2020, Hampden-Sydney had expanded its academic offerings to include more than 50 majors and minors, with recent additions including majors in engineering physics and biochemistry and molecular biology.

In 2017 the college added a new student center and renovated an existing facility to create a state-of-the-art center for the arts. A center for entrepreneurship and innovation was also launched in 2017. In recent years the campus has also added a high ropes course featuring a vertical climbing wall, suspended ropes obstacles, and zip line.

In 2018, the college's Wilson Center for Leadership in the Public Interest launched a four-year leadership development program, with 47 first-year students in the inaugural cohort. The center and program are named for the late Lieutenant General Samuel V. Wilson, a former Hampden-Sydney president who "combined the savvy of a spymaster with the grit of a hardened combat veteran," according to a 2017 New York Times obituary.

2019 saw the launch of a new experiential learning program called Compass, which requires students to complete at least three experiential learning courses from options including internships, study abroad, research, service learning, and hands-on classroom experiences. A $6 million gift from Cindy and Rob Citrone (class of 1987) was dedicated to supporting the Compass program. That same year, the college also received the donation of $30 Million from the Pauley Family Foundation. These funds were used to construct the Pauley Science Center which replaced the section of the grounds previously host to Bagby Hall. The sightline from Venable hall to Cushing hall was restored, an intentional design element dating to the 1820s which was previously blocked by Bagby Hall.

In August 2020, the college completed a new 147-bed residential complex called the Grove. Footpaths and a central courtyard link the lodge-like, apartment-style residence halls. A neighboring community lodge overlooks Lake Chalgrove and features indoor and outdoor fireplaces and grilling space.

Construction began in 2020 on the new, 73,000-square-foot Pauley Science Center. The Pauley Science Center debuted in the fall semester of 2022, with its dedication on November 11, 2024

=== Name ===
Under the influence of his mentor and father-in-law Witherspoon, Smith named the college for two English champions of liberty, John Hampden (1594–1643) and Algernon Sydney (1622–1683). Hampden lost his life in the Battle of Chalgrove Field during the English Civil War. Sydney, who wrote Discourses Concerning Government, was beheaded by order of Charles II following his (unproven) implication in a failed attempt to overthrow the king.

=== Presidents ===
The following is a list of the Presidents of Hampden–Sydney College from its opening in 1775 until the present.

| # | Name | Term begin | Term end | Notes |
|---|---|---|---|---|
| 1 | Samuel Stanhope Smith | 1775 | 1779 | |
| 2 | John Blair Smith | 1779 | 1789 | |
| * | Drury Lacy | 1789 | 1797 | Vice President and Acting President |
| 3 | Archibald Alexander | 1797 | 1806 | |
| * | William S. Reid | 1807 | 1807 | Vice President and Acting President |
| 4 | Moses Hoge | 1807 | 1820 | |
| 5 | Jonathan P. Cushing | 1821 | 1835 | Acting President (1820–1821) |
| * | George A. Baxter | 1835 | 1835 | Acting President |
| 6 | Daniel Lynn Carroll | 1835 | 1838 | |
| 7 | William Maxwell | 1838 | 1845 | |
| 8 | Patrick J. Sparrow | 1845 | 1847 | |
| * | S. B. Wilson | 1847 | 1847 | Acting President |
| * | F. S. Sampson | 1847 | 1848 | Acting President |
| * | Charles Martin | 1848 | 1849 | Acting President |
| 9 | Lewis W. Green | 1849 | 1856 | |
| * | Albert L. Holladay | 1856 | 1856 | Died before taking office |
| * | Charles Martin | 1856 | 1857 | Acting President |
| 10 | John M. P. Atkinson | 1857 | 1883 | |
| 11 | Richard McIlwaine | 1883 | 1904 | |
| * | James R. Thornton | 1904 | 1904 | Acting President |
| * | W. H. Whiting, Jr. | 1904 | 1905 | Acting President |
| * | J. H. C. Bagby | 1905 | 1905 | Acting President |
| 12 | James G. McAllister | 1905 | 1908 | |
| * | W. H. Whiting, Jr. | 1908 | 1909 | Acting President |
| 13 | Henry T. Graham | 1909 | 1917 | |
| * | Ashton W. McWhorter | 1917 | 1919 | Acting President |
| 14 | Joseph DuPuy Eggleston | 1919 | 1939 | |
| 15 | Edgar Graham Gammon | 1939 | 1955 | |
| 16 | Joseph Clarke Robert | 1955 | 1960 | |
| 17 | Thomas Edward Gilmer | 1960 | 1963 | |
| 18 | W. Taylor Reveley II | 1963 | 1977 | |
| 19 | Josiah Bunting III | 1977 | 1987 | |
| 20 | James Richard Leutze | 1987 | 1990 | |
| * | John Scott Colley | 1990 | 1991 | Acting President |
| 21 | Ralph Arthur Rossum | 1991 | 1992 | Resigned after nine months |
| 22 | Samuel V. Wilson | 1992 | 2000 | |
| 23 | Walter M. Bortz III | 2000 | 2009 | |
| 24 | Christopher B. Howard | 2009 | 2016 | |
| * | Dennis G. Stevens | 2016 | 2016 | Acting President |
| 25 | John Lawrence Stimpert | 2016 | Sitting | |

== Academics ==
Hampden–Sydney enrolls approximately 1,000 students from 30 states and several foreign countries and emphasizes a rigorous, traditional liberal arts curriculum.

=== Rankings ===
Academic rankings

Liberal arts
- U.S. News & World Report: 98
- Washington Monthly: 198

National
- Forbes: 314
- WSJ/College Pulse: 274

- U.S. News & World Report ranked Hampden–Sydney #98 in its 2022 rankings of the top National Liberal Arts Colleges.
- Forbes awarded Hampden–Sydney with an "A" grade in its 2016 Forbes College Financial Grades; an evaluation methodology designed to "measure the fiscal soundness of nearly 900 four-year, private, not-for-profit colleges with at least 500 students".
- The Princeton Review ranked Hampden–Sydney #2 in its 2020 rankings of Best Alumni Network. The Princeton Review also ranked Hampden-Sydney's Bortz Library #2 in its 2025 rankings of Best College Library. In addition, the Princeton Review ranked Hampden-Sydney #14 in its 2020 rankings of Best Schools for Internships.

=== Honor Code ===
In addition to Wabash College and Morehouse College, Hampden–Sydney is one of only three remaining traditional all-male colleges in the United States and was noted in a 1999 Newsweek article as exemplary. Many identify with the school's mission of forming good men, rigorous students, and American citizens. The honor code reflects these values.

=== Western Culture Program ===
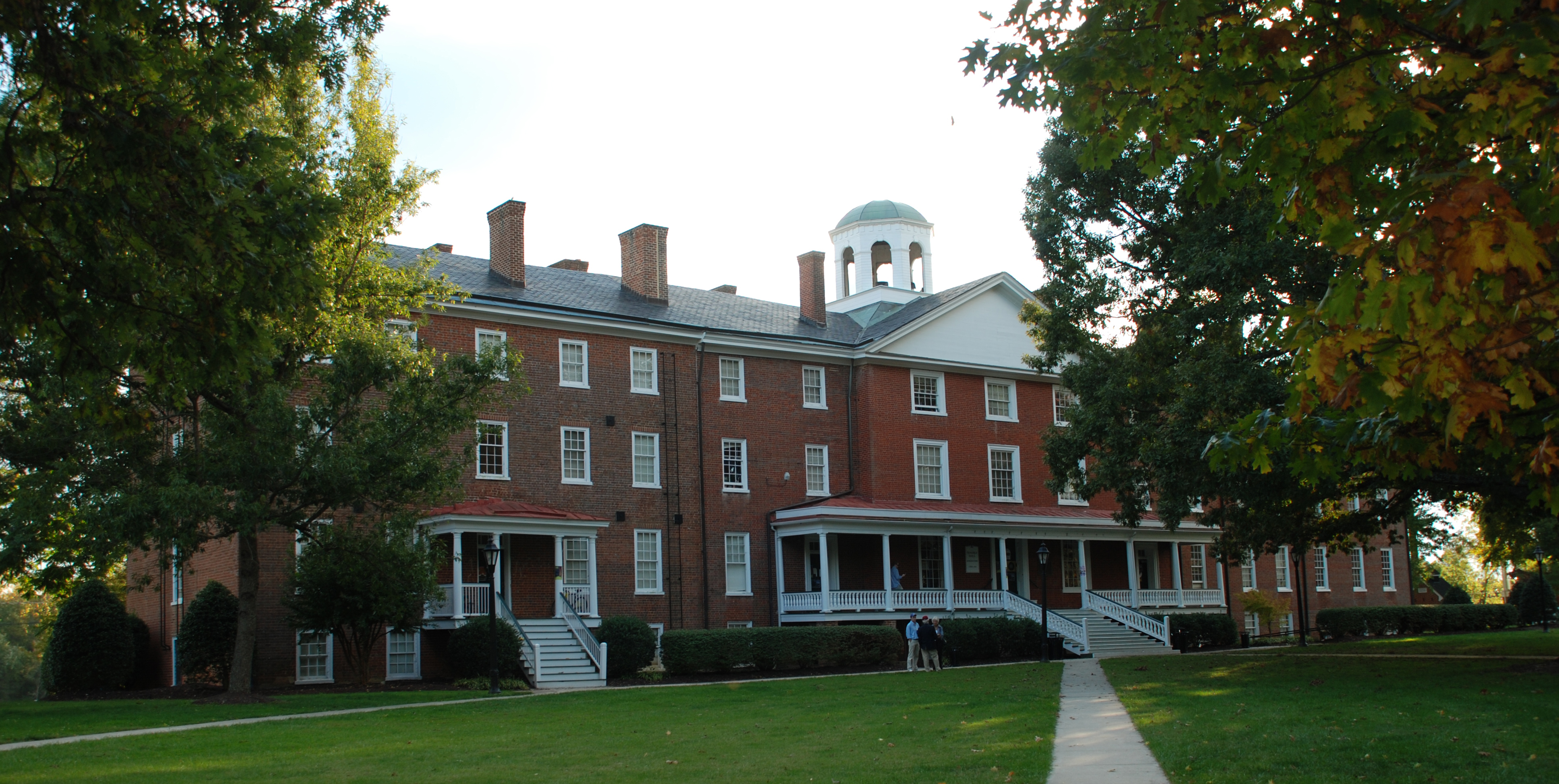
Venable Hall, original home of the Union Theological Seminary

All Hampden–Sydney students must take two semesters of Western culture as part of a three-course Core Cultures sequence. In addition to the Western Culture courses, which introduce them to some of the great works and historical events from Greece and Rome through present times, students take at least one Global Cultures course, which compares hierarchical structures, cultural frameworks, and regional and global networks from the beginning of human history to the present. Western Culture has been described as "the bedrock of Hampden–Sydney's liberal arts program and one of the most important of its core academic requirements." The Core Cultures program draws on professors from all disciplines.

=== Rhetoric Program ===
The Rhetoric Program is based on a 1978 faculty resolution that states: "All Hampden-Sydney graduates will write and speak competently." Every student must prepare for and pass the Rhetoric Proficiency Exam, which consists of a three-hour essay that is graded for grammatical correctness and the coherence, quality, and style of the argument.

While the program was formalized in 1978, the emphasis on rhetoric dates back to the college's founding. In a September 1775 advertisement in the Virginia Gazette, founding president Samuel S. Smith wrote, "The system of Education will resemble that which is adopted in the College of New Jersey; save, that a more particular Attention shall be paid to the Cultivation of the English Language than is usually done in Places of public Education."

== Campus ==
- Hampden-Sydney College Historic District
- U.S. National Register of Historic Places
- U.S. Historic district
- Virginia Landmarks Register
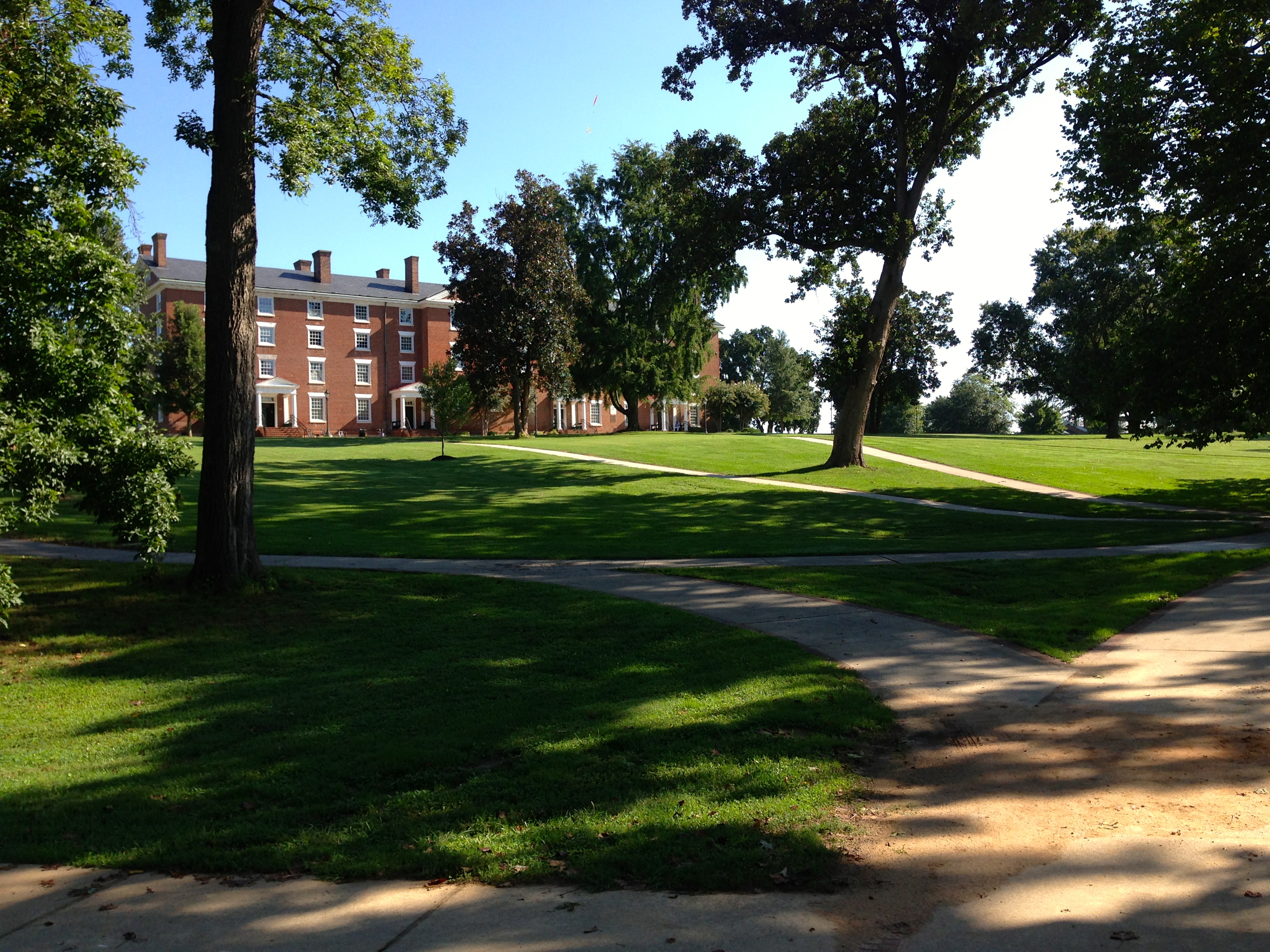
- The grounds of Hampden–Sydney

- Location within Virginia Location within the United States
- Location: Bounded approximately by the Hampden–Sydney College campus, Hampden Sydney, Virginia
- Area: 1,300 acres (530 ha)
- Architect: Multiple
- Architectural style: Greek Revival, Federal
- NRHP reference No.: 70000822
- VLR No.: 073-0058

Significant dates
- Added to NRHP: February 26, 1970
- Designated VLR: December 2, 1969

The college expanded from its original small cluster of buildings on 100 acres (40 ha) to a campus of over 1,300 acres (530 ha). Before 2006, the college owned 660 acres (270 ha). In February 2006, the college purchased 400 acres (160 ha) which includes a lake and Slate Hill Plantation, the historic location of the college's founding. The campus is host to numerous federal-style buildings. Part of the campus has been listed on the National Register of Historic Places as a historic district.

== Student life ==
=== Culture ===
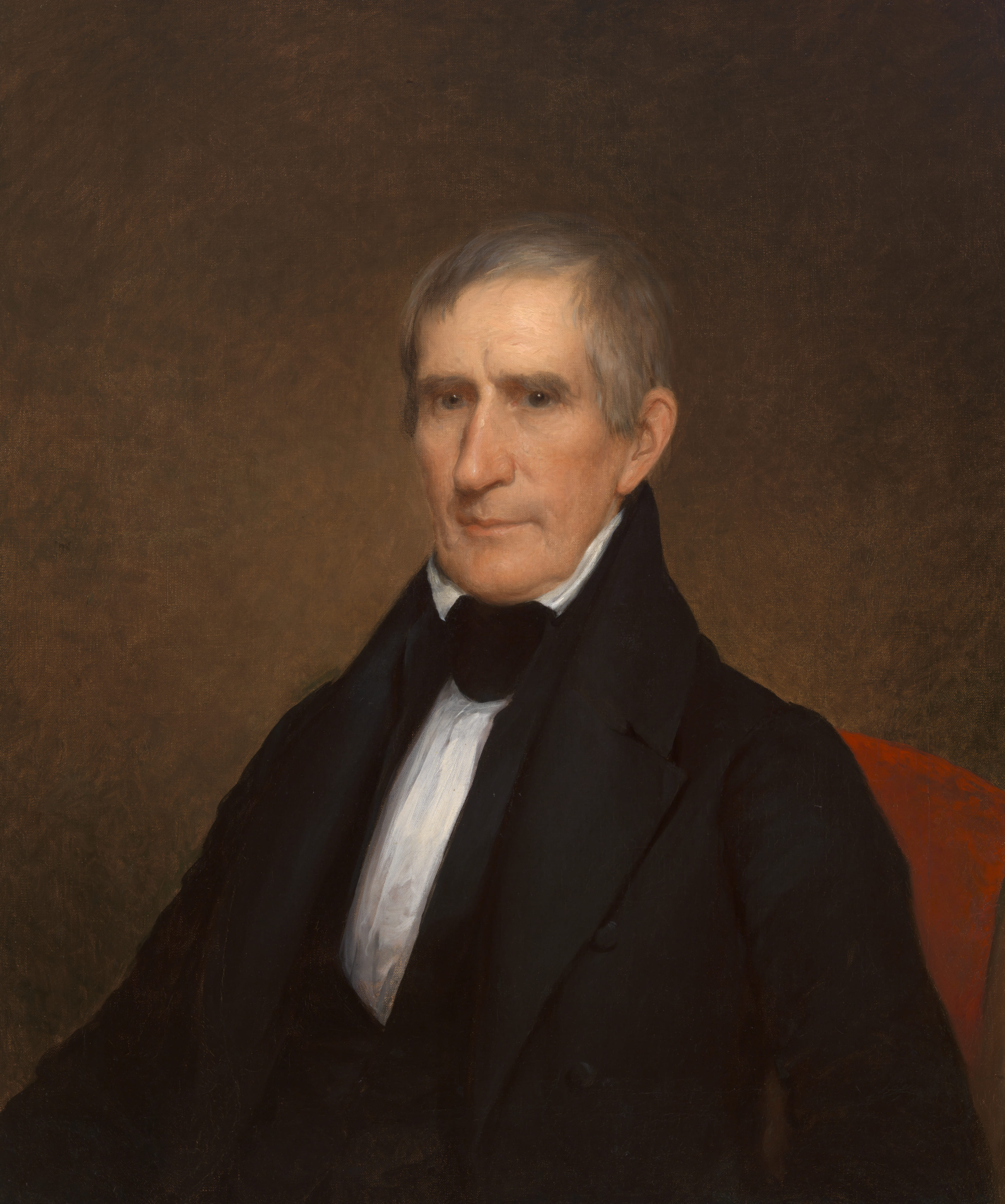
William Henry Harrison, the ninth president of the United States, attended Hampden-Sydney

Given that it is older than the United States and one of just a handful of colleges for men, Hampden–Sydney College has a distinctive culture that values tradition. When they arrive on campus, freshmen are issued a copy of To Manner Born, To Manners Bred: A Hip-pocket Guide to Etiquette for the Hampden–Sydney Man, which covers basic manners, how to greet and introduce people, how to navigate job interviews, how to respond to invitations, how to dress for various occasions (such as the difference between a black-tie and white-tie event), how to pair wine with food, etc. The college publishes the book as a useful tool for existing successfully in a variety of social settings. To Manner Born has been highlighted in the New York Times and on the CBS Late Show with Stephen Colbert, who attended Hampden-Sydney in the 1980s.

Tailgating before football games is central to Hampden–Sydney's social culture each fall, and the college's tailgate scene has been featured in Town & Country and Southern Living, which ranked Hampden-Sydney as one of the top-20 best tailgates in the Southern United States, alongside large schools like Ole Miss and Alabama.

Many students are passionate outdoorsmen, and Field & Stream has called Hampden-Sydney a "hidden gem for outdoorsmen" in a list of "21 of the Best Colleges for Hunters and Anglers," where the college ranked #7.

The Princeton Review ranked Hampden-Sydney #21 on a list of "Happiest Students" and #11 on a list of "Their Students Love These Colleges" from a 2025 survey of students at 391 colleges.

=== Clubs and organizations ===
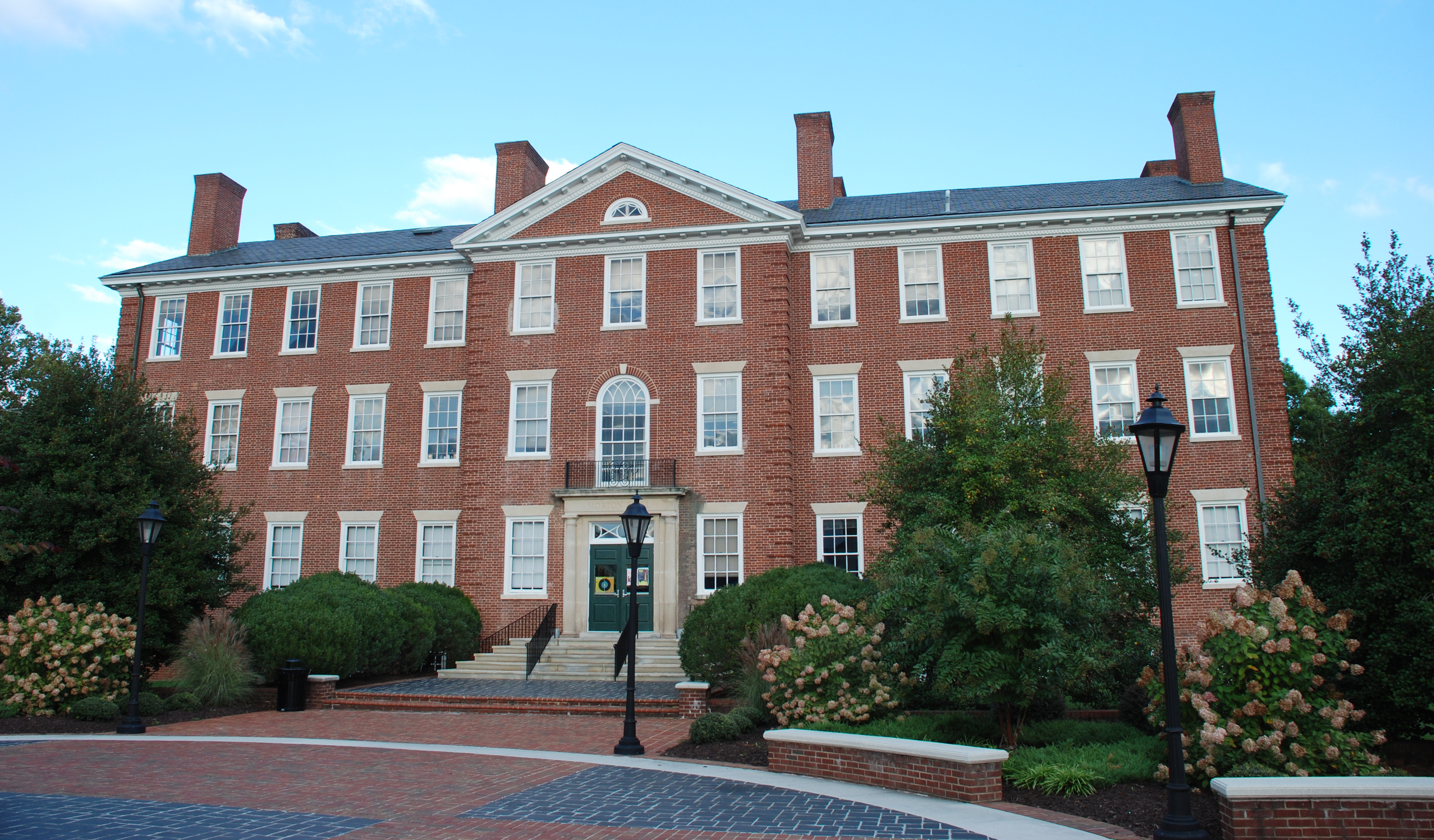
Morton Hall, front facade

There are more than 50 clubs on campus, each run by students. There are political clubs, sports clubs, religious clubs, a student-run radio station, a pep band, and multiple social fraternities. There are also volunteer groups such as Habitat for Humanity and Rotaract.

The 100-year-old student newspaper, The Hampden-Sydney Tiger, has produced many prominent journalists, including Jonathan Martin of the New York Times, Chris Stirewalt of Fox News, Charles Hurt of the Washington Times, Matthew Karnitschnig, the chief Europe correspondent for Politico and a Pulitzer Prize finalist, and Matthew Phillips of CNN, who was previously an editor for Bloomberg Businessweek and Freakonomics.

The college campus is home to the Hampden-Sydney Volunteer Fire Department, which provides fire suppression service and non-transport basic life support EMS to Prince Edward County and the college, as well as assisting the Farmville fire department at fires within the town limits. HSVFD, Company 2, is located on the southern end of campus near the water tower and the physical plant. Since the department's incorporation in 1982 it has not been legally affiliated with the college, despite the fact a majority of active members are college faculty, staff, or students.

Union-Philanthropic Literary Society (UPLS) is the oldest student organization at Hampden–Sydney College. Established on September 22, 1789, UPLS is the nation's oldest literary and debating society, still in existence today without interruption.

=== Greek life ===
Internal sources claim that roughly 47% of the student body is involved in Greek life. Beta Theta Pi used Atkinson Hall (built 1834) as a fraternity house when it came to campus in 1850, possibly making it one of the first fraternity houses in North America.

== Athletics ==
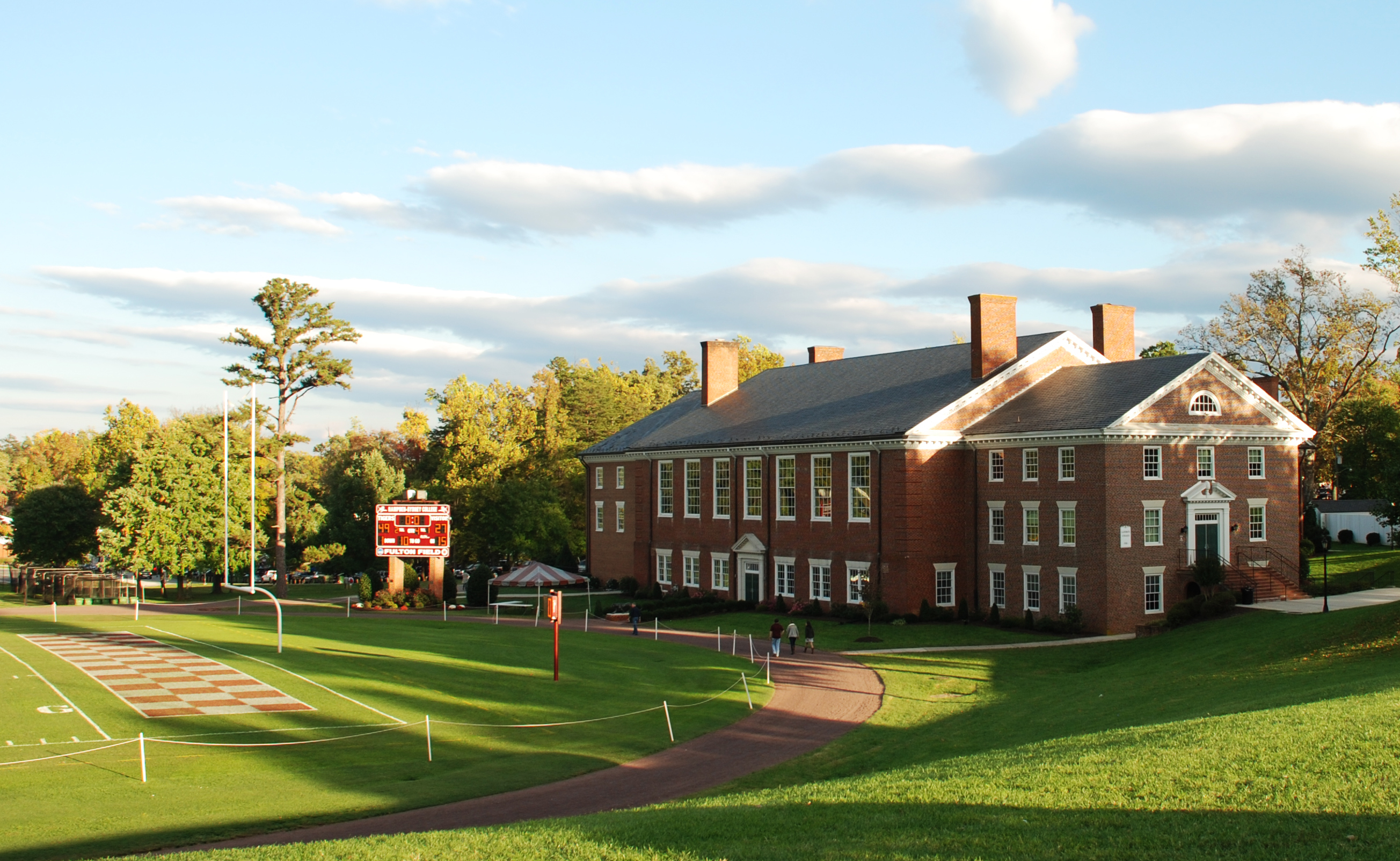
Kirk Athletic Center at Hampden–Sydney

Hampden–Sydney athletic teams are the Tigers. The college is a member of the Division III level of the National Collegiate Athletic Association (NCAA), primarily competing in the Old Dominion Athletic Conference (ODAC) since the 1976–77 academic year.

Hampden–Sydney competes in ten intercollegiate varsity sports: Men's sports include baseball, basketball, cross country, football, golf, lacrosse, soccer, swimming & diving, tennis, and distance track. The Tigers have rugby as a club sport.

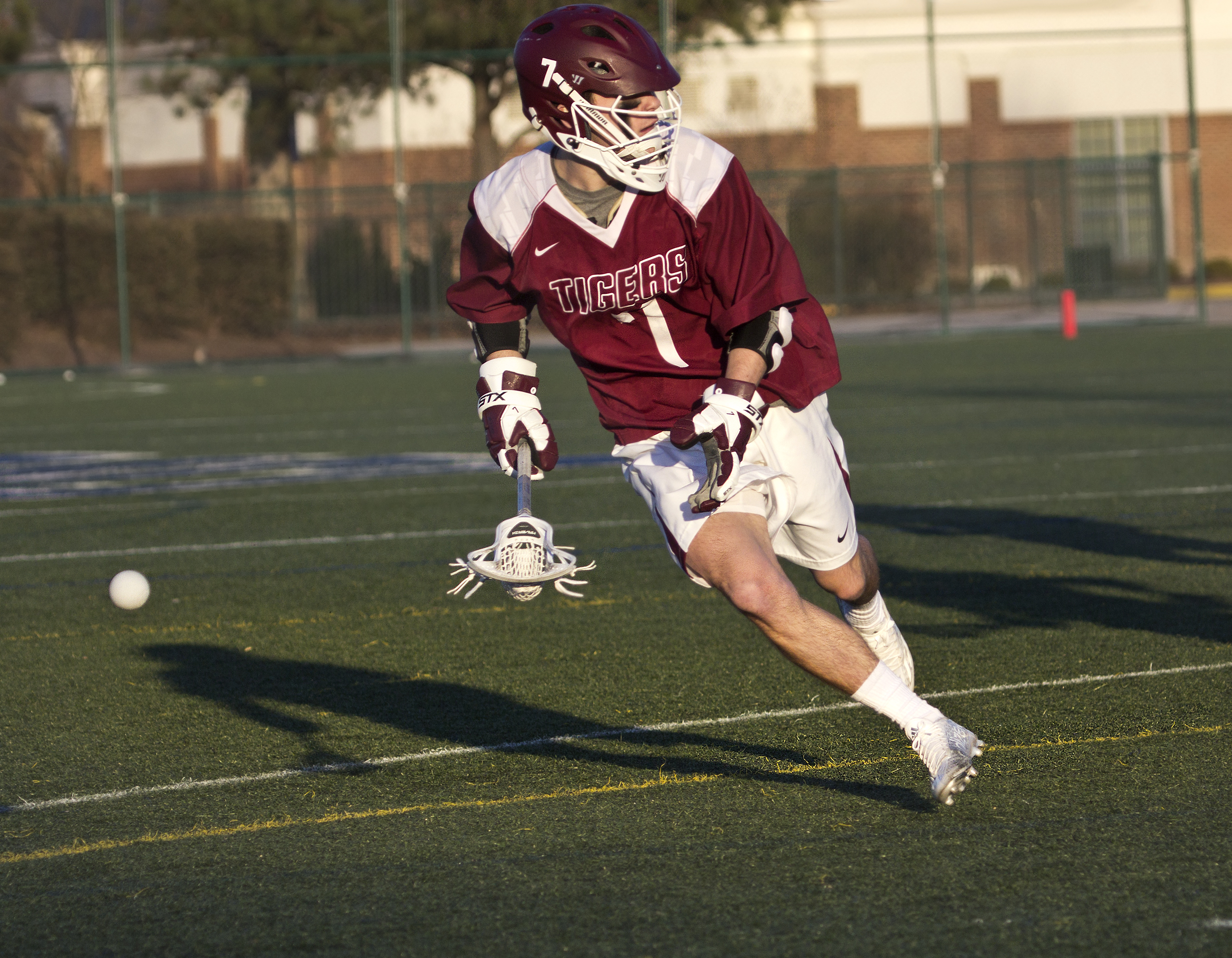
A HS lacrosse player

Hampden–Sydney's rivalry with Randolph–Macon College is one of the longest-running college rivalries in the United States. "The Game" is often referred to as the oldest small-school football rivalry in the Southern United States, with the first match up having been played in 1893. Athletic events involving the two schools are fiercely competitive, and the week prior to "The Game" between Hampden–Sydney and Randolph–Macon is known as "Beat Macon Week".

Several Hampden–Sydney athletes have gone on to successful coaching careers, including Russell Turner, the head coach of the UC Irvine men's basketball team, and Ryan Odom, who in the 2018 NCAA men's basketball tournament led the No. 16 seed UMBC Retrievers to a historic upset over the No. 1 seed Virginia Cavaliers; Odom became the UVA coach in March 2025. Ryan Silverfield, an alumnus and former student-assistant with the Hampden–Sydney football program, was named head football coach at the University of Memphis just before the 2019 Cotton Bowl Classic after previously serving as an assistant with the Detroit Lions and Minnesota Vikings.

== Notable faculty and staff ==
- William G. Boykin- Retired U.S. Army lieutenant general, former James C. Wheat Jr. Professor in Leadership (2007–2017)
- John Hillen- Business executive, 15th Assistant Secretary of State for Political-Military Affairs (2005–2007), James C. Wheat Professor in Leadership (2020–2025)
- Hugo F. Rodriguez- Class of 1988, U.S. Foreign Service officer, James C. Wheat Jr. Professor in Leadership (2025–present)
- Samuel V. Wilson- Commonly known as "General Sam"; retired U.S. Army lieutenant general, Distinguished Service Cross recipient, political science professor 1977–1992, 22nd President of Hampden-Sydney 1992–2000, honorary member of the Class of 2000

== Bibliography ==
- Brinkley, John Luster. On This Hill: A narrative history of Hampden Sydney College, 1774–1994. Hampden–Sydney: 1994. ISBN 1-886356-06-8
