= Richard McIlwaine (educator) =

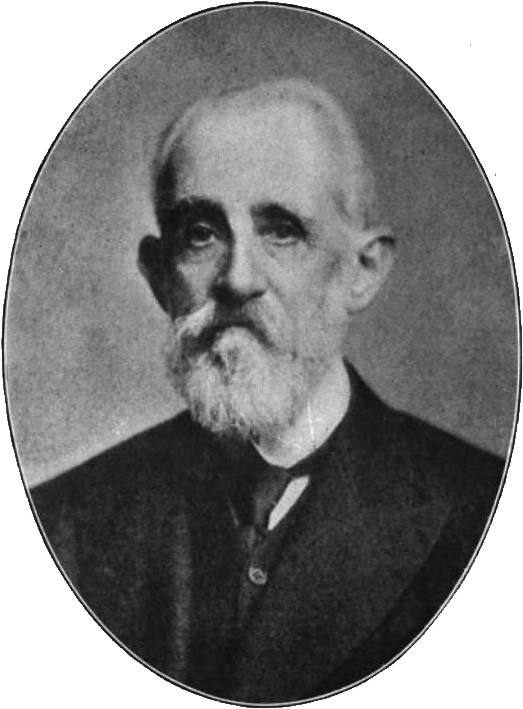

11th President of Hampden–Sydney College
- In office June 13, 1883 – June 15, 1904
- Preceded by: John M. P. Atkinson
- Succeeded by: James R. Thornton (Acting)

Personal details
- Born: May 18, 1834 Petersburg, Virginia
- Died: August 9, 1913 (aged 79) Petersburg, Virginia
- Spouse: Elisabeth Read
- Children: Richard McIlwaine; Elisabeth Read McIlwaine; Martha McIlwaine Frazer
- Education: B.A. Hampden–Sydney College; Union Theological Seminary; D.D. Rhodes College; L.L. D. Davidson College
- Profession: Theologian, college president

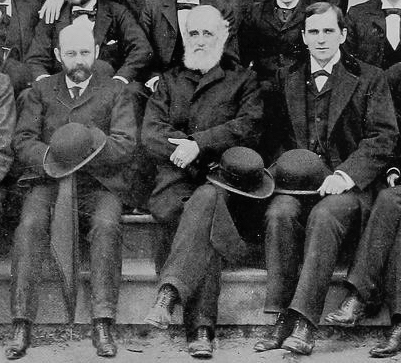
Richard McIlwaine (center) and nephew Henry Read McIlwaine (left) in 1897 Kaleidoscope

Richard McIlwaine (May 18, 1835 – August 9, 1913) was the eleventh President of Hampden–Sydney College from 1883 to 1904. He wrote an autobiographical account of his life experiences titled Memories of Three Score Years and Ten.

== Early life ==
Richard McIlWaine was born in Petersburg, Virginia, of Scotch Irish descent. His father, Archibald Graham McIlwaine, was a mogul in flaxseed brokerage.

He attended Hampden–Sydney College alongside his brothers, J. Finley McIlwaine (graduating in 1858 and a trustee from 1866 to 1870) and Archibald Graham McIlwaine Jr. (graduating in 1865). He was an 1853 alumnus of the college at the age of 19. Their father was a major benefactor to the college, donating $5000 in 1859 ($142,857 in 2014 dollars), "the largest single cash gift to the College to that date and for over thirty years after".

He then went on to study at the University of Virginia, where, in 1855, he was a founding brother of Beta Theta Pi. He also studied at the Union Theological Seminary and the Free Church College of Edinburgh, Scotland. He was licensed by the East Hanover presbytery in 1857.

== Career ==
McIlwaine preached in Farmville and Lynchburg until 1872. In 1872, he was elected secretary and treasurer of the home and foreign missions committee of the Southern Presbyterian church. Around 1882, was secretary of home missions, a position he resigned from after being elected to the presidency of Hampden–Sydney College in 1883.

As president, he increased the student body from 74 to 154 by 1892. He also helped to greatly increase the college's endowment, and a memorial building was erected in his honor. In 1874, he received from Southwestern Presbyterian University (now Rhodes College) the degree of Doctor of Divinity. In 1902, he became a member of the Commonwealth convention that was called to revise the state constitution, and was also the chairman of the committee on schools.

In his letter of resignation from presidency of Hampden–Sydney, McIlwaine wrote,

Having learned by your discussions of last night that some — perhaps a majority — of your are of the opinion that my usefulness in my present position is at an end, I hereby offer my resignation. I beg at the same time to resign my position as a Trustee in the College, which I have held for thirty-four or five years, and which I did not resign when elected President.

Very Respectfully,
Richard McIlwaine
President and Professor of
Moral and Biblical Studies

McIlwaine's nephew Henry Read McIlwaine graduated from Hampden–Sydney College in 1885 and with a Ph.D. from Johns Hopkins University in 1893. Henry returned to Hampden–Sydney in 1893 to serve as professor of English and history until 1907. In 1907, he was appointed State Librarian for the Virginia State Library, a position he held until his death.

== Death ==
McIlwaine died on August 9, 1913.

Academic offices
Preceded by John M. P. Atkinson	President of Hampden–Sydney College; 1883–1904	Succeeded by James R. Thornton
