= Crowders Mountain Township, Gaston County, North Carolina =

Township in Gaston County, North Carolina, U.S.

Coordinates: 35.2725727°N 81.2739073°W

Crowders Mountain Township is a township in southwestern Gaston County, North Carolina, United States. At the 2010 census, it had a population of 15,821.

The township contains the city of Bessemer City, a western portion of the city of Gastonia, and an eastern portion of the city of Kings Mountain. The township takes its name from Crowder's Mountain, a 1,625-foot-high (495 m) ridge in the western part of the township and home to Crowders Mountain State Park.

Historical population
Census	Pop.	Note	%±
2000	14,426		—
2010	15,821		9.7%
2020	16,294		3.0%
U.S. Decennial Census
