= Mansfield (Petersburg, Virginia) =

Historic house in Virginia, United States

- U.S. National Register of Historic Places
- Virginia Landmarks Register
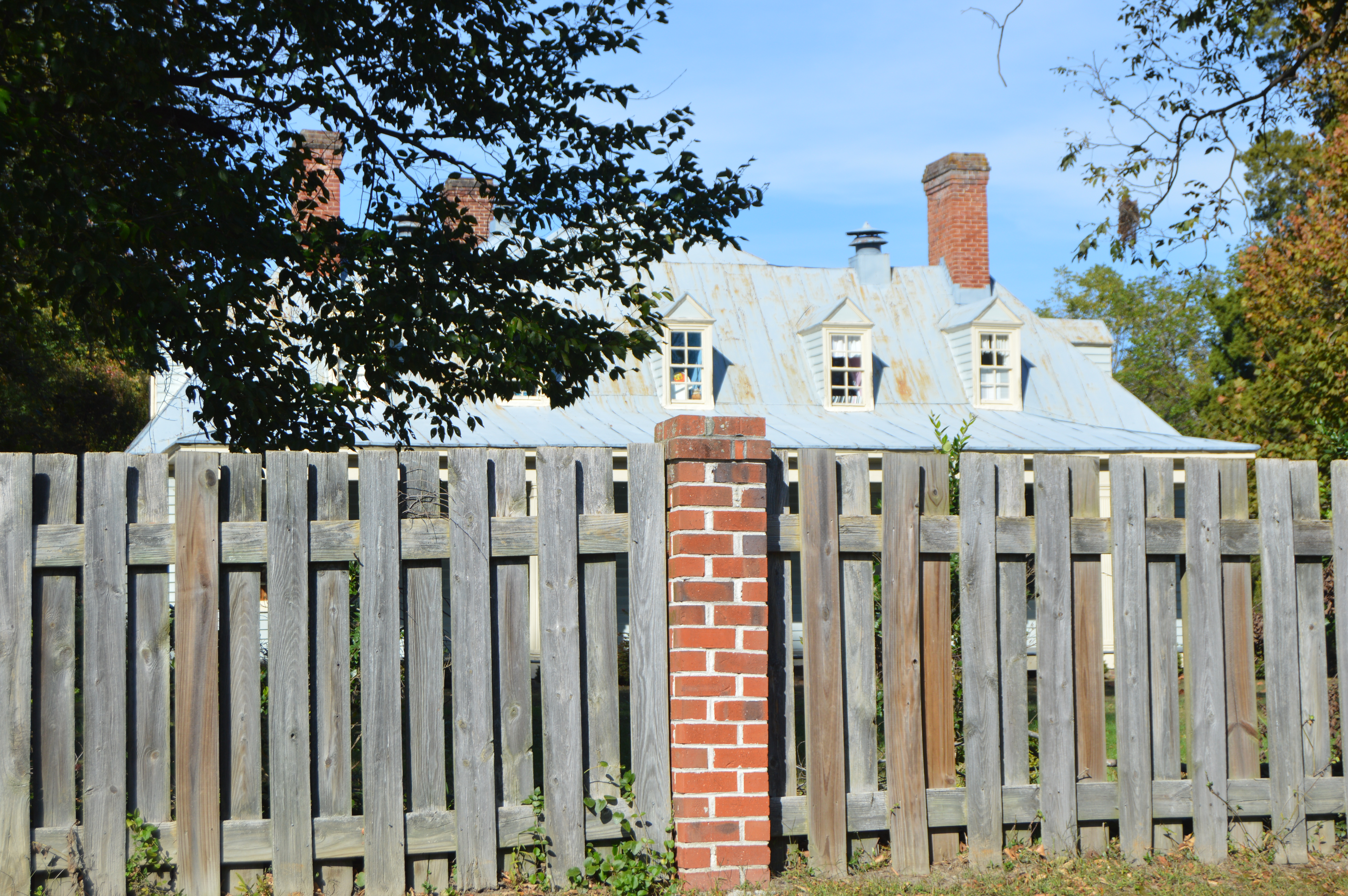
- Roadside view with fence

- Location within Virginia Location within the United States
- Location: West of Petersburg on Mark Dr., near Petersburg, Virginia
- Coordinates: 37°13′13″N 77°28′14″W
- Area: 75 acres (30 ha)
- Built: c. 1750
- NRHP reference No.: 76002103
- VLR No.: 026-0012

Significant dates
- Added to NRHP: May 28, 1976
- Designated VLR: December 12, 1975

Mansfield is a historic plantation house located near Petersburg, Dinwiddie County, Virginia. It was built in stages starting about 1750, and is a 1 1/2-story long and narrow frame dwelling with a hipped roof. It has a hipped roof rear ell connected to the main house by a hyphen. It features an octastyle Colonial Revival porch stretching the full length of the front facade.

It was listed on the National Register of Historic Places in 1976.
