= Christopher B. Howard =

American academic

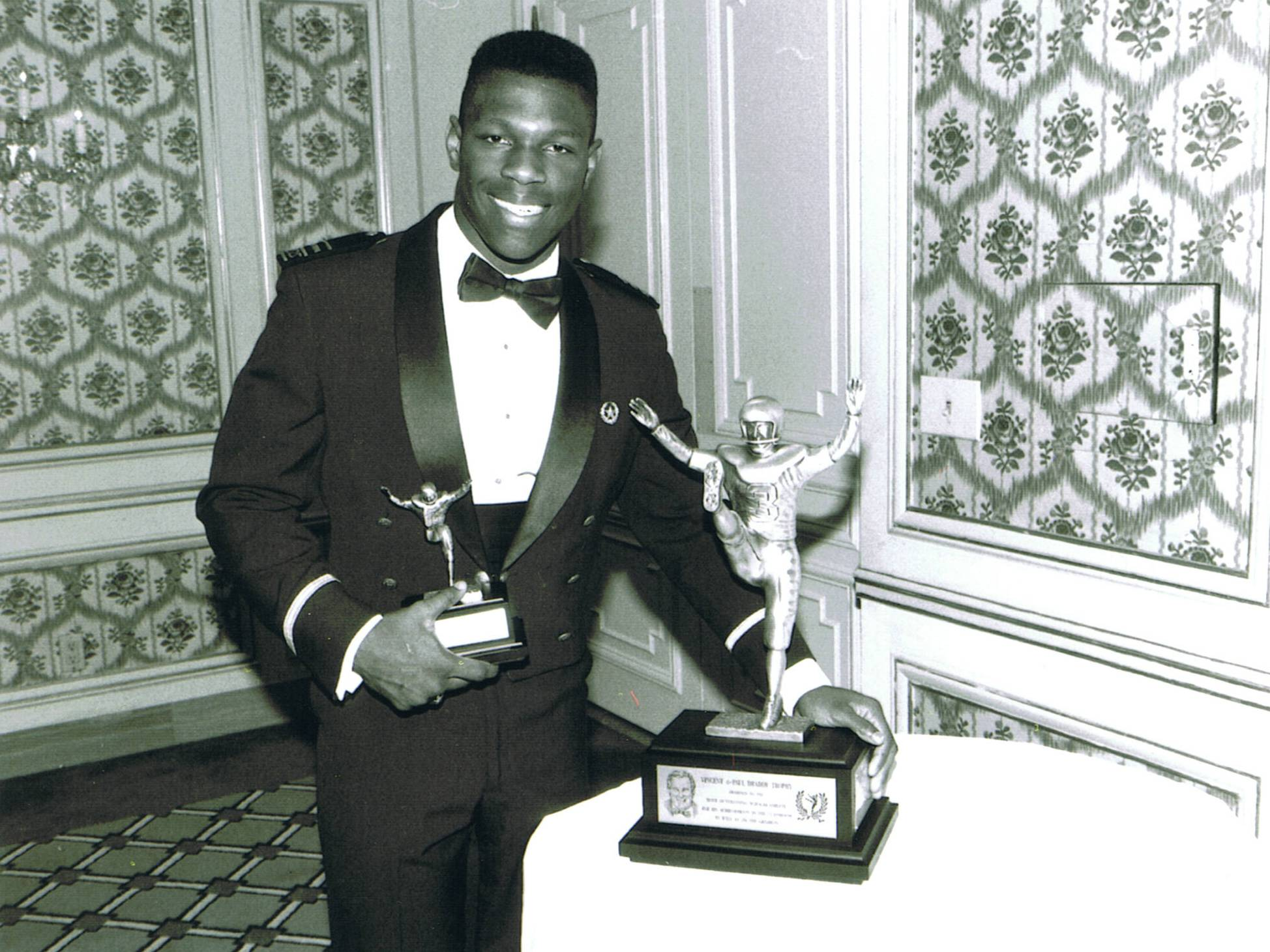
- Howard in 1990

Executive Vice President and Chief Operating Officer of the Arizona State University Public Enterprise
- Incumbent
- Assumed office February 7, 2022

Personal details
- Spouse: Barbara Noble Howard
- Children: 2
- Education: United States Air Force Academy (BS); Oxford University (DPhil); Harvard University (MBA)
- Profession: Executive Vice President and Chief Operating Officer of the Arizona State University Public Enterprise
- Website: https://www.asu.edu/about/leadership

Christopher B. Howard is the executive vice president and chief operating officer of the Arizona State University Public Enterprise in Tempe, Arizona, where he started on February 7, 2022. Previously, he served as the 8th president of Robert Morris University in Moon Township, Pennsylvania. He is a former college football running back and former United States Air Force officer.

He is a member of The Trilateral Commission.

== Education and athletics ==
He is a 1986 graduate of Plano Senior High School in Plano, Texas, where he helped the 1986 football team win a Texas State Championship. Howard is a 1991 graduate of the United States Air Force Academy, earning a Bachelor of Science in political science. While at the Academy, he served as his class president and as a cadet group commander.

He was selected as a First Team Academic All-American as the starting running back on the Air Force Falcons football team and awarded the inaugural Draddy Trophy in 1990 by the National Football Foundation. In 2003, he was inducted into the Academic All American Hall of Fame. Howard received the National Collegiate Athletic Association (NCAA) Silver Anniversary Award in 2016.

Howard was named a Rhodes Scholar, and he attended Oxford University from 1991 to 1994, earning a Master of Philosophy and a Doctorate of Philosophy in Politics. In 2003, he earned a Master of Business Administration degree with distinction from Harvard Business School. In 2018, Harvard Business School awarded Howard its Alumni Achievement Award.

== Military career ==
While in the Air Force, Howard served as a helicopter pilot and an intelligence officer. He accompanied Secretary of Defense William Cohen to Cape Town, South Africa, as a military advisor in 1998. He served with the 24th Special Tactics Squadron and earned the Joint Service Commendation and NATO Medals for service in Bosnia. He is a retired Air Force Reserve lieutenant colonel. He was called to active duty for one year during 2003, serving as the Chief of the Human Intelligence Operations Cell in Afghanistan where he was awarded the Bronze Star.

== Civilian career ==
In 1999, Howard worked in various capacities for Bristol-Myers Squibb, serving as a manager on a $100 million HIV/AIDS initiative in southern Africa called Secure The Future.

Howard is the founder and a trustee emeritus of the Impact Young Lives Foundation, a non-profit organization that provides scholarship and travel opportunities for South African students of color.

Beginning in May 2003, Howard served in General Electric's Corporate Initiatives Group where he reported to the Chief Information Officer. While working with GE, he led several initiatives, including the company's effort to expand its African businesses.

In September 2005, Howard became Associate Vice President for Strategic & Leadership Initiatives, and later Vice President at the University of Oklahoma where he also served as the Director of the Honors College Leadership Center, Associate Professor, and a President's Associates Presidential Professor.

In 2009, he became president of Hampden-Sydney College, where he increased enrollment and balanced the college's budget.

After his tenure at Hampden-Sydney, Howard became president of Robert Morris University in 2016. During Howard's tenure as president at RMU, the university's largest funding campaign ever met its $100 million goal a year ahead of schedule, collecting funds for the UPMC Events Center, scholarships, research and teaching centers, and expansion of the John Jay Center for the School of Engineering, Mathematics and Science. Despite some of these successes, during Howard's tenure enrollment declined precipitously even before the Covid pandemic exacerbated the decline further, and the university's financial position weakened causing massive layoffs. The end of Chris Howard's time at Robert Morris University was punctuated by the student body booing Howard off the stage as he was introduced during the annual welcome back to school party in September 2021.

On May 26, 2021, Robert Morris University's men's and women's NCAA division 1 hockey teams were shut down by Howard and the chairman of the board of trustees without a vote from the board, although Howard said there was "consensus" for his decision. Board member Kevin Colbert resigned in reaction to the lack of vote on the decision. Howard attributed his decision to the costs of maintaining the programs. Alumni players and RMU hockey supporters formed the Pittsburgh College Hockey Foundation to raise money for the hockey teams, and the hockey programs were reinstated for the 2023-24 season.

In January 2017, Howard was selected to be a member of the College Football Playoff Selection Committee.

He was elected to a six-year term on the Harvard Board of Overseers in 2021. In February, 2022, Howard was appointed executive vice president and chief operating officer at Arizona State University.

== Personal life ==
Howard married Barbara Noble, whom he met on a 1993 trip to South Africa. They have two sons.

Academic offices
| Preceded by Walter M. Bortz III | President of Hampden–Sydney College; 2009—2016 | Succeeded by Dennis G. Stevens |
| Preceded by David Jamison | President of Robert Morris University; 2016–2022 | Succeeded by |
