= Hampden Sydney, Virginia =

- CDP
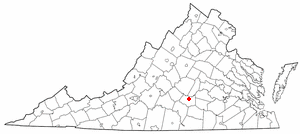
- Location of Hampden Sydney, Virginia
- Coordinates: 37°14′38.6″N 78°28′33.7″W
- Country: United States
- State: Virginia
- County: Prince Edward

Area (2010)
  - Total: 3.894951 sq mi (10.087877 km^{2})
  - Land: 3.878253 sq mi (10.044629 km^{2})
  - Water: 0.016698 sq mi (0.043248 km^{2})
- Elevation: 538 ft (164 m)

Population (2010)
  - Total: 1,450
  - Density: 327/sq mi (126.1/km^{2})
- Time zone: UTC−5 (Eastern (EST))
  - Summer (DST): UTC−4 (EDT)
- ZIP code: 23943
- Area code: 434
- FIPS code: 51-34304
- GNIS feature ID: 1495648

Hampden Sydney is a census-designated place (CDP) in Prince Edward County, Virginia, United States. The population was 1,450 at the 2010 census.

Hampden Sydney is the home of Hampden–Sydney College, a private all-male college that is the tenth-oldest institution of higher education in the United States.

== Geography ==
Hampden Sydney is located at 37°14′38.6″N 78°28′33.7″W (37.244067, −78.476032).

According to the United States Census Bureau, in 2000 the CDP had an area of 4.4 square miles (11.6 km^{2}), all of it land. According to the United States Census Bureau in 2010, it had an area of 3.895 square miles (10.087 km^{2}) with 3.878 square miles (10.044 km^{2}) of land and 0.017 square miles (0.043 km^{2}) of water.

== Demographics ==
As of the census of 2010, there were 1,450 people, 172 households, and 108 families residing in the CDP. The population density was 322.2 people per square mile (126.1/km^{2}). There were 197 housing units at an average density of 43.7/sq mi (17.1/km^{2}). The racial makeup of the CDP was 85.4% White, 11.7% African American, 0.8% Asian, and 1.0% from two or more races. Hispanic or Latino of any race were 2.8% of the population.

In the CDP, the population was spread out, with 5.3% under the age of 18, 74.8% from 18 to 24, 5.9% from 25 to 44, 9.2% from 45 to 64, and 4.8% who were 65 years of age or older. The median age was 21.1 years. For every 100 females, there were 636 males. For every 100 females aged 18 and over, there were 737.2 males.

Demographics from the 2010 census are skewed by students attending the all-male, Hampden–Sydney College with an undergrad population of 1090. Fifteen- to 25-year-olds make up about 76% of the population (1,107 of 1,450). At the 2010 census, 908 (904 males) of the 1,450 are listed as residing in "group quarters".

== Education ==
Hampden–Sydney College is in the CDP.

All parts of Prince Edward County are in the Prince Edward County Public Schools school district.
