= Ormond Beatty =

American educator and academic administrator (1815–1890)

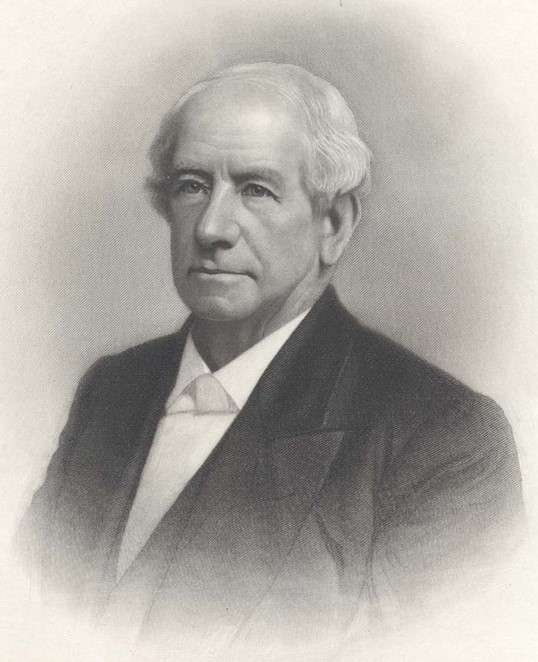
- 1890 portrait

7th President of Centre College
- In office September 1, 1870 – June 19, 1888; Pro tempore: 1868 – September 1, 1870
- Preceded by: William L. Breckinridge
- Succeeded by: William C. Young

Personal details
- Born: August 13, 1815 Mason County, Kentucky, U.S.
- Died: June 24, 1890 (aged 74) Danville, Kentucky, U.S.
- Resting place: Bellevue Cemetery
- Spouses: Sarah Lewis Rochester (Note: Yerkes, Hayes & Blayney (1893) lists the name of Beatty's first wife as Sallie, but the marriage records from the time of their marriage and the Biographical Encyclopædia of Kentucky (1878) list her name as Sarah.) (m. 1839, died); Mildred Ann Bell (m. 1848; died 1867); Elizabeth O. Boyle (m. 1879; died 1886)
- Children: 2
- Education: Centre College (AB, AM); Yale College
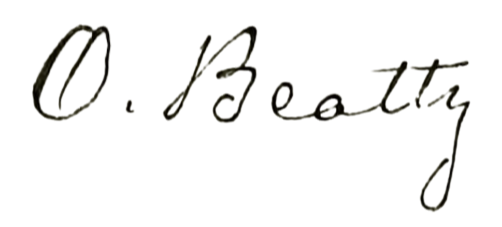
- Signature

Ormond Beatty (August 13, 1815 – June 24, 1890) was an American educator and academic administrator. He was the seventh president of Centre College in Danville, Kentucky.

An 1835 graduate of Centre, Beatty became a professor the following year and taught chemistry, natural philosophy, mathematics, metaphysics, biblical history, and church history over the course of his career. He was selected to fill the position of president pro tempore following the resignation of William L. Breckinridge in 1868 and was unanimously elected president by the board of trustees in 1870. He was Centre's first president who was not a Christian minister, and he led the school until his resignation in 1888, at which point he taught for two additional years before his death in 1890. Beatty also involved himself in religious affairs, serving as a ruling elder in the First and Second Presbyterian Churches in Danville, as a commissioner to three Presbyterian Church General Assemblies, and as a trustee of the Danville Theological Seminary.

== Early life and education ==
Beatty was born on August 13, 1815, in Mason County, Kentucky, the fourth of five sons of Sarah (née Green) and Adam Beatty. His father was a circuit court judge and a member of the Kentucky General Assembly for the Whig Party; he ran for election to the House of Representatives, unsuccessfully, in 1838. In his youth, Ormond attended the Franklin Academy, located in Washington, Kentucky, and he departed home for college in 1832. His initial destination was Ohio University, in Athens, Ohio, but changed to Centre College "at the last moment and by the merest chance", according to a biography written by Yerkes, Hays, and Blayney from the Kentucky Synod. He spent three years at Centre before graduating in 1835, as he had "been advanced" to the sophomore class while still a freshman. Before he graduated, he was offered a teaching position by President John C. Young, a position Beatty accepted but did not begin for another year. In that intervening year, he pursued further studies at Yale University under the chemist Benjamin Silliman. He joined the junior class of Yale College and attended six lectures per week for a total of seven months, all taught by Silliman.

== Career ==
After finishing his studies at Yale, Beatty returned to Centre in 1836. He took the position he had accepted the year prior and became a professor of chemistry and natural philosophy. He switched to teaching mathematics in 1847 and earned a Master of Arts degree the same year. He spent five years in this post before resuming teaching his original two subjects in 1852, which he did for another twelve years. In addition to teaching, Beatty was the Smithsonian climate observer for Boyle County during the American Civil War and is credited with having recorded the official weather observations for the Battle of Barbourville, in September 1861, and the Battle of Perryville, in October 1862. In 1863, Abraham Lincoln appointed him to be a visitor to the United States Military Academy in West Point, New York. In 1866, he was awarded an honorary Legum Doctor degree from Princeton University.

Beatty taught until the resignation of President William L. Breckinridge in 1868. To fill the vacancy, Beatty was appointed president pro tempore. After he served in the interim role for two years, the board of trustees unanimously elected him president of the college and professor of metaphysics and political science on September 1, 1870. With this, Beatty became the first Centre president who was not a Christian minister. One of Beatty's early accomplishments as president was the construction of the Old Main Building, which began in 1870 and was completed upon the building's dedication on June 26, 1872, after a total cost of $60,000 (equivalent to $1,613,000 in 2025); Beatty was formally inaugurated on the same day. The building has since been demolished and was replaced by the Grace Doherty Library. In March 1873, the Falls City Tobacco Bank in Louisville was robbed of $300,000 (equivalent to $8,063,000 in 2025); the result was the loss of nearly $100,000 (equivalent to $2,688,000 in 2025) in uninsured bonds belonging to the college, leaving Centre's endowment at only $33,000 (equivalent to $887,000 in 2025). A portion of the bonds, worth about $40,000 (equivalent to $1,075,000 in 2025), was recovered relatively quickly, and Beatty led an effort to replace the rest of the stolen money which succeeded in raising over $58,000 (equivalent to $1,559,000 in 2025) from the community, church, and other nearby residents.

The Ormond Beatty Prize was created by students and alumni in his honor in 1886, the fiftieth anniversary of his first year teaching at Centre. Former Congressman John Finis Philips gave the address at the presentation. Beatty attempted on multiple occasions to resign from the presidency, submitting resignations on June 15 and November 30, 1886; the latter was accepted, but did not go into effect until a successor had been secured. Although the process was protracted, William C. Young, son of former President John C. Young, was elected on June 19, 1888, to fill the role. In total, Beatty was the college's president for 18 years before leaving the office. In an effort to retain him as part of the faculty and prevent him from retiring from the college altogether, the trustees elected him to be professor of metaphysics. However, they only required him to lecture for one hour per day in order to keep him for as long as possible; this desire stemmed from his longstanding association with the college and both his skill and care as an educator. While a member of Centre's faculty, Beatty was elected to membership of Centre's chapter of the Beta Theta Pi fraternity.

Beatty joined the Danville Presbyterian Church in 1835 and was elected a ruling elder of the church in 1844; he held this position until the opening of the Second Presbyterian Church in 1852, at which point he took the same position there. Beatty was thrice selected as a commissioner to the Presbyterian Church General Assembly: in 1855, 1866, and 1867. Siding with the Old School in the Old School–New School controversy, he was appointed to committees in 1866 and 1883 to discuss reunion with the New School Assembly and Southern Presbyterian Church, respectively. Beatty was selected as a delegate to the first and second General Councils of the Presbyterian Alliance, held in Edinburgh in 1877 and in Philadelphia in 1880. He was a director and trustee of the Danville Theological Seminary and taught biblical history and medieval and modern church history there on multiple occasions. He was also on the Board of Trustees of Caldwell College, later the Kentucky College for Women, which was located in Danville. In 1882, he was elected to be the first president of the College Educational Association of Kentucky.

== Personal life and death ==
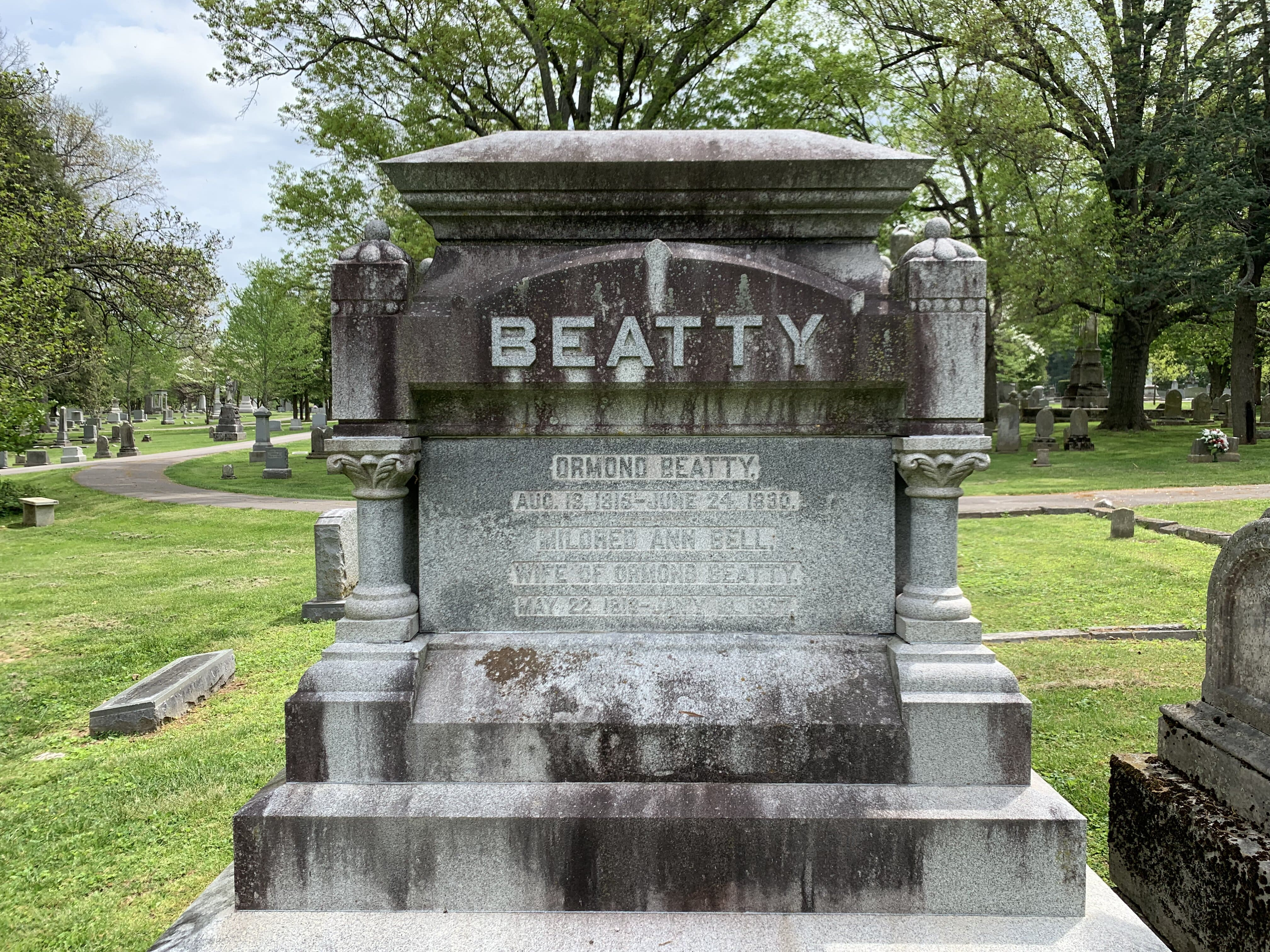
Beatty's headstone at his grave in Bellevue Cemetery in Danville

Beatty was married three times throughout his life, with each marriage ending due to the death of his wife. His first marriage was to Sarah Lewis Rochester, a relative of the founder of Rochester, New York, and RIT president Nathaniel Rochester, on September 19, 1839; the couple had one child, Charles, and Sarah died after "a year or two", according to Yerkes, Hays, and Blayney. Beatty's second marriage was to Mildred Ann Bell in 1848, and his second child, Pattie, was born of this marriage. Mildred died in 1867 and is buried with Beatty. He was married for a third and final time in 1879, to Elizabeth Boyle, widow of Jeremiah Boyle; they did not have children and Elizabeth died in 1886. Beatty was a slaveowner, and the 1860 census lists him as having owned one slave.

Beatty died in his sleep at 4:10 p.m. on June 24, 1890, at the age of 74, in Danville. He had experienced severe pain for much of that morning. He was still a member of the Centre faculty at the time, having taught for two years after his resignation as president. He had been receiving medical treatment for several years before, though he downplayed the severity and effect of his malady and did not give up teaching at any point. His funeral was held on June 26 at the Second Presbyterian Church in Danville and was presided over by Rev. C. B. H. Martin, who was its pastor at the time. He was buried in Danville's Bellevue Cemetery; The Kentucky Advocate later said that the funeral procession to the cemetery was "the largest ... that ever went within the portals of the Danville cemetery". His obituary in The Kentucky Advocate termed him "Kentucky's greatest educator".
