= List of presidents of Centre College =

Head of Centre College

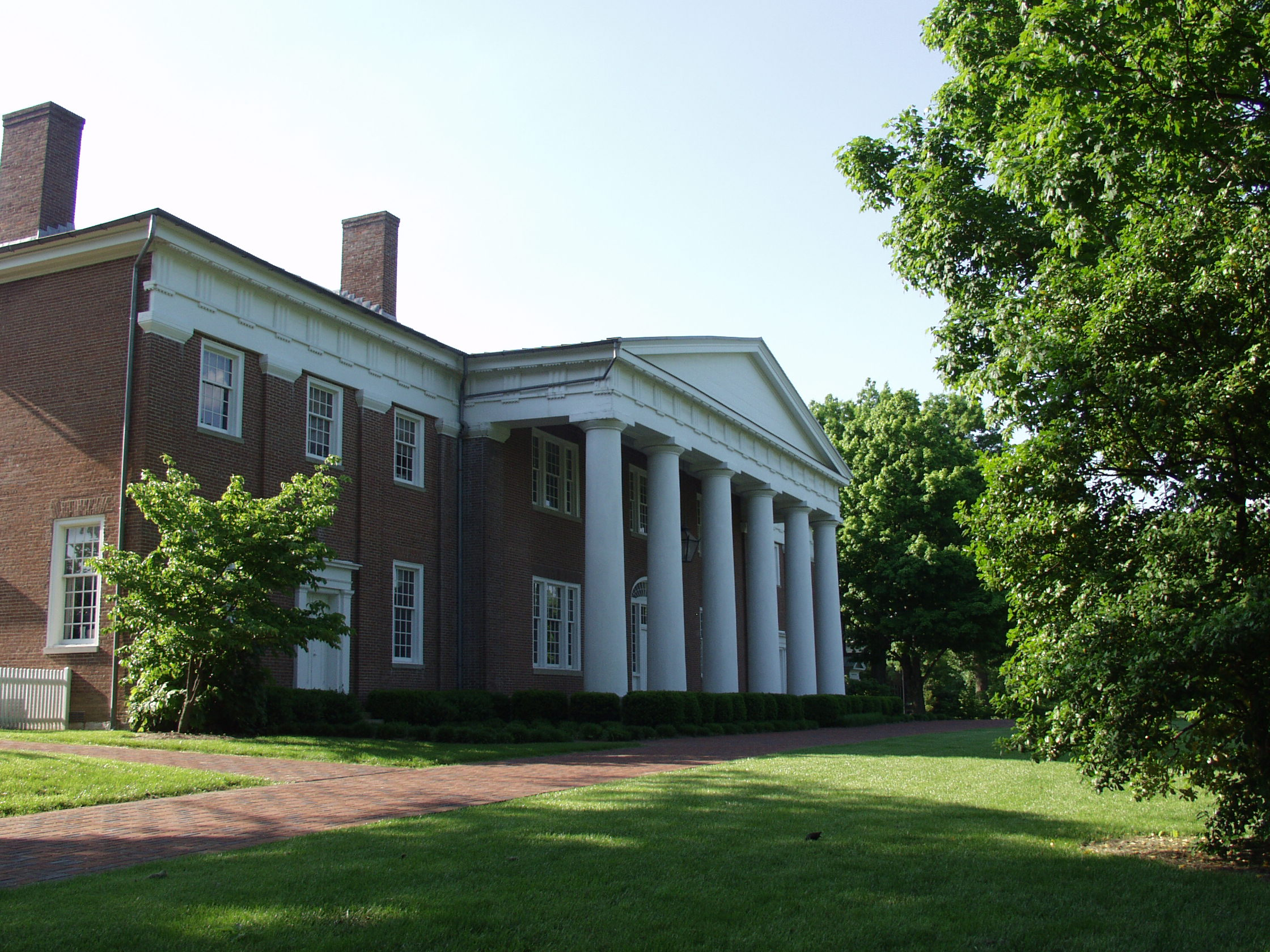
The president's office is located in Old Centre (pictured in 2005).

Centre College is a private liberal arts college located in Danville, Kentucky, United States. It was founded by leaders of the Presbyterian Church, an affiliation it still loosely maintains, and was formally chartered by the Kentucky General Assembly on January 21, 1819. Isaac Shelby, the former governor of Kentucky, chaired the school's first board of trustees, which met for the first time in February 1819. Centre's first president was James McChord; although he died two months after his election before actually having taken the role, he is still recognized as the school's first leader. In the college's early years, the president was paid $1,000 annually (equivalent to $23,000 in 2025) and taught several courses. For much of the school's history, the college required its president and most of its board members to be Presbyterian. Originally on a de facto basis, this requirement was formalized in 1921 under William Arthur Ganfield and remained until 1969, one year after Centre withdrew from the Kentucky Synod, during the tenure of Thomas A. Spragens.

The close relationship with the church is evident in Centre's history, as Spragens, the school's seventeenth president, was the first who was not a member of the clergy; even then, he was a Presbyterian elder from age 29. Fourteen of the school's first sixteen presidents were Presbyterian ministers (only Ormond Beatty and Charles J. Turck were laymen), though none since Spragens have been. Michael F. Adams was the first who was not Presbyterian. Four presidents—John C. Young, William L. Breckinridge, William C. Young, and William C. Roberts—held positions as moderator of the General Assembly in the Presbyterian Church in the United States of America. Five Centre presidents have died in office: both Youngs, who were father and son, McChord, Roberts, and Lewis W. Green. Green was one of two members of Centre's first graduating class in 1824 and was the first Centre alumnus to become president; he has since been joined by Beatty (class of 1835), William C. Young (1859), and Robert J. McMullen (1905).

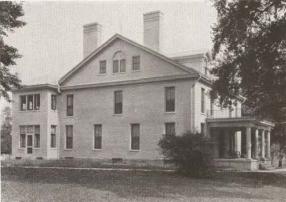
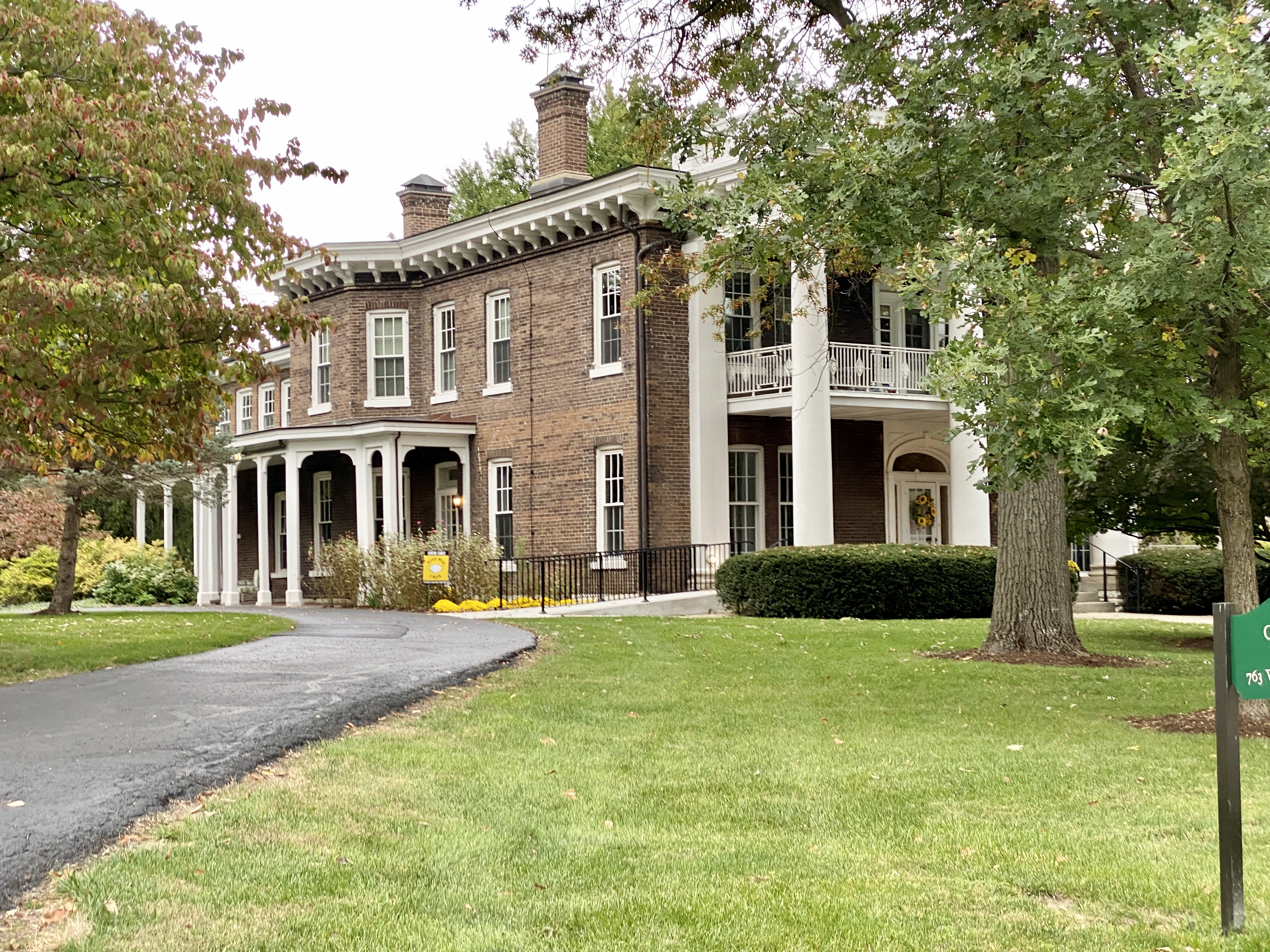
All Centre presidents since John C. Young have lived in either Hillcrest House (left, in 1927) or Craik House (right, in 2021).

John C. Young, who held office for nearly 27 years, is the longest-serving president in Centre's history. Spragens, who held the position for 24 years, and John A. Roush, who held it for 22 years, had the next-longest tenures in office. The 21st and current president of Centre College is Milton C. Moreland, who has held office since July 1, 2020. He is an archaeologist by training and was formerly the provost and vice president for academic affairs at Rhodes College. In 2025, the president was the highest-paid employee at the school, with a total salary of $519,977.

Craik House has been the residence of the college president for most of the time since the school bought the house in 1937. Originally built in 1853, the Italianate-style home was first owned by William Moore, a Danville farmer, and later by George Welsh, a merchant and member of Centre's board of trustees. When the college purchased the house using funds from a donation given by Henry Nelson Craik, an 1890 Centre graduate, the building was renamed for him. President Robert L. McLeod was the first to occupy the house, but during the 1940s consultants recommended the house be abandoned due to obsolete utilities and the inadequacy of its layout for hosting large receptions. For about ten years thereafter, the house was unused, until it was renovated in 1958 in preparation for the arrival of President Spragens to once again serve as the president's home. It underwent further renovations in 1982 and 2021. From 1831 to 1937, all presidents from John C. Young to Turck lived in Hillcrest House during their presidencies. Hillcrest later served as a faculty residence, a student residence, and an academic building for various periods before being demolished in 1969.

== Presidents ==
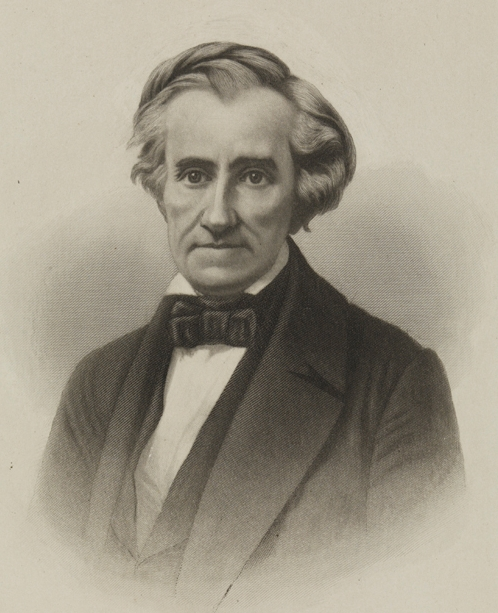
John C. Young

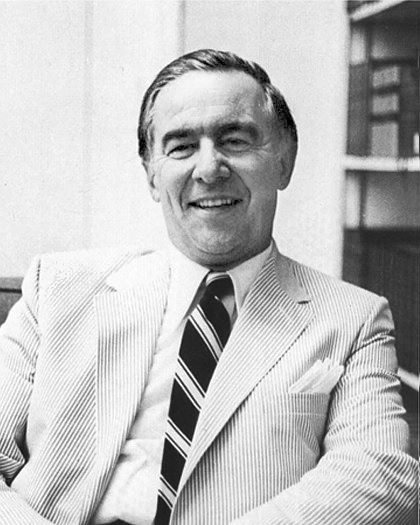
Thomas A. Spragens

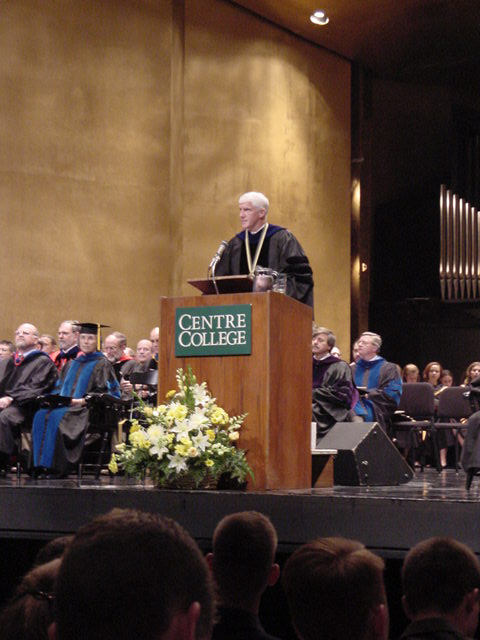
John A. Roush

Presidents
No.	Name	Term in office	Notes	Ref.
1	Rev. James McChord	1820 (Note: Died in office)	Founder of Second Presbyterian Church (Lexington, Kentucky); died before officially assuming the presidency, but still considered the first president	
2	Rev. Jeremiah Chamberlain	1823 – 1826	President of the College of Louisiana (1826–1828); founding president of Oakland College (1830–1851)	
3	Rev. Gideon Blackburn	1827 – 1830		
4	Rev. John C. Young	1830 – 1857	Pastor of Danville Presbyterian Church (1834–1852); moderator of the PCUSA General Assembly (1853); Centre's longest-serving president	
5	Rev. Lewis W. Green	1858 – 1863	Centre alumnus (1824); president of Hampden–Sydney College (1848–1856); president of Transylvania University (1856–1857)	
6	Rev. William L. Breckinridge	1863 – 1868	Moderator of the PCUSA General Assembly (1859); president of Oakland College (1860–1861)	
7	Ormond Beatty	1870 – 1888	Centre alumnus (1835); the first Centre president who was not a minister	
8	Rev. William C. Young	1888 – 1896	Centre alumnus (1859); moderator of the PCUSA General Assembly (1892); son of fourth president John C. Young	
9	Rev. William C. Roberts	1898 – 1903	President of Lake Forest University (1886–1892); moderator of the PCUSA General Assembly (1889)	
10	Rev. Frederick W. Hinitt	1904 – 1915	President of Parsons College (1900–1904); president of Washington & Jefferson University (1915–1918)	
11	Rev. William Arthur Ganfield	1915 – 1921	President of Carroll College (1921–1939)	
12	Rev. R. Ames Montgomery	1922 – 1926	President of Parsons College (1917–1922)	
13	Charles J. Turck	1927 – 1936	President of Macalester College (1939–1958)	
14	Rev. Robert L. McLeod	1938 – 1945 (Note: Robert L. McLeod and Robert J. McMullen served as co-presidents from September 1944 to November 1945 while McLeod was on a leave of absence serving as a chaplain in the United States Navy.)		
15	Rev. Robert J. McMullen	1944 – 1946	Centre alumnus (1905); president of Hangchow Christian College (1938–1942)	
16	Rev. Walter A. Groves	1947 – 1957	President of Abadan Institute of Technology (1957–1961)	
17	Thomas A. Spragens	1957 – 1981	President of Stephens College (1952–1957)	
18	Richard L. Morrill	1982 – 1988	President of Salem College (1979–1982); president of the University of Richmond (1988–1998)	
19	Michael F. Adams	1989 – 1997	President of the University of Georgia (1997–2013)	
20	John A. Roush	1998 – 2020		
21	Milton C. Moreland	2020 – present		
