= Thomas A. Spragens =

American academic administrator (1917–2006)

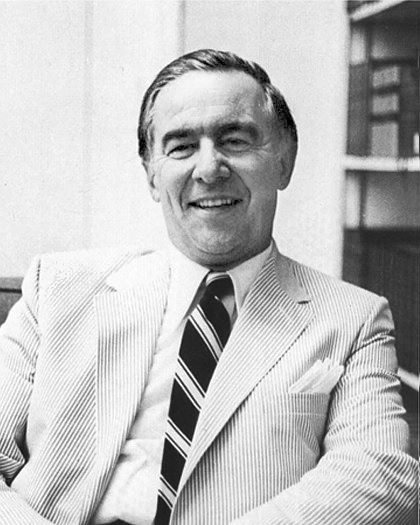
- Spragens c. 1972

17th President of Centre College
- In office November 11, 1957 – November 16, 1981
- Preceded by: Walter A. Groves
- Succeeded by: Richard L. Morrill

President of Stephens College (Note: Spragens was either the 17th or 18th president of Stephens College, though sources disagree as to which.)
- In office December 1, 1952 – November 11, 1957
- Preceded by: Homer P. Rainey
- Succeeded by: Seymour Smith

Personal details
- Born: Thomas Arthur Spragens; April 25, 1917 Lebanon, Kentucky, U.S.
- Died: February 11, 2006 (aged 88) Columbia, South Carolina, U.S.
- Resting place: Bellevue Cemetery
- Party: Democratic
- Spouse: Catharine Smallwood (m. 1941)
- Children: 3
- Education: University of Kentucky (BA)

Thomas Arthur Spragens (/ˈspreɪ.ɡɪnz/ SPRAY-ginz; April 25, 1917 – February 11, 2006) was an American administrator who was the 17th president of Centre College in Danville, Kentucky. A graduate of the University of Kentucky, Spragens worked for the state and federal government early in his career, before joining the staff at Stanford University as a presidential advisor. He was the president of Stephens College in Columbia, Missouri, for a five-year term, and left Stephens to go to Centre in 1957.

The first Centre president who was not a member of the clergy, Spragens worked to lessen the ties between the college and the Presbyterian Church, which led to a significant rise in students reporting that they were non-denominational; it also led to attendance at chapel becoming optional for students. Spragens was an effective fundraiser for the school; his Fund for the Future Campaign ultimately raised $34 million. He was instrumental in the integration of the school, and admitted Centre's first black student in 1962. The same year, he led an effort to consolidate the school's women's department, formerly the Kentucky College for Women, onto Centre's campus. Many parts of campus were upgraded during his presidency; after twenty years, three quarters of Centre's facilities had been either built or renovated. During his term, which ended in 1981, Centre's student enrollment and faculty numbers both nearly doubled, its endowment increased, and the property value of its campus rose.

He was selected by two governors to be a part of commissions which studied higher education in Kentucky, and was a part of the American Association of Colleges and Universities, the Southern Association of Colleges and Schools, and the American Council on Education at different times. He was active in Democratic Party politics, and was a delegate to the 1968 Democratic National Convention in support of Senator Eugene McCarthy. Additionally, he was a part of an effort which culminated in the 1962 founding of what is now the Southern Collegiate Athletic Conference, of which Centre remained a charter member until 2011.

== Early life and education ==
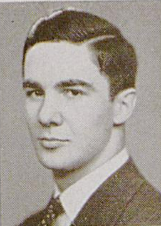
Spragens as a senior at the University of Kentucky in 1938

Spragens was born on April 25, 1917, in Lebanon, Kentucky. He was the third of seven children in his family. His father, William Henry Spragens, was a lawyer and circuit court judge from Casey County, Kentucky, and his mother, Lillian Brewer Spragens, was from Lancaster, Kentucky. He attended Lebanon High School, graduating in 1934, and was recruited by then-president Charles J. Turck to attend Centre College in Danville, Kentucky, alongside three classmates with whom he formed a locally popular singing quartet. Turck's hope was that the four of them would attend Centre and replace the "Centre College Quartet", the members of which were soon graduating. Spragens's three classmates decided to attend Centre but he ultimately opted for the University of Kentucky (UK) in Lexington instead, though he did join the glee club at UK. He enrolled in, and attended, the university's College of Commerce (now the Gatton College of Business and Economics) for a year and a half, but afterwards transferred to the College of Arts and Sciences and majored in economics. He graduated from UK in 1938. After a summer employed by the Kentucky state government, he won a public administration fellowship and began graduate work at the Maxwell School of Citizenship and Public Affairs at Syracuse University. He completed only one year of his graduate program; after spending the summer following the first year working for the Bureau of the Budget (now the Office of Management and Budget), he decided to forgo the second year in favor of a permanent position with the Bureau.

== Career ==
=== Early career, 1940–1957 ===
Spragens worked for the federal government from 1940 to 1945 in multiple positions, including in his new permanent job as a senior analyst at the Bureau of the Budget, and in a job with the Foreign Economic Administration, which operated during World War II. In mid-1946, Spragens left his government positions to work at Stanford University as an assistant to the college president and as Stanford's representative in Washington, D.C. In this position, he assisted two presidents: Donald Tresidder, who originally hired him, and Wallace Sterling, who took over after Tresidder's death. He helped the college to manage its increasing enrollment numbers, which spiked from 4,500 in June 1946 to 7,200 in November of the same year. Spragens intended to remain in this position for only one to two years, and afterwards return to government work, but ended up working there for five years.

In 1951, Spragens left Stanford to accept a position as the secretary and treasurer of the Fund for the Advancement of Education, which was a newly-formed subsidiary of the Ford Foundation. He worked in this position for just over a year before he was offered the presidency of Stephens College, a women's college in Columbia, Missouri. An announcement of his hiring was made to students and faculty at Stephens on November 1, 1952, and he began in this role exactly one month later, on December 1. At Stephens, he implemented a plan which saw the use of closed-circuit television as an academic aid, for which the school received "wide notice in educational circles". Television was used mainly as a supplement to seminar-style classes with small numbers of students, and it allowed lecturers to speak to multiple sections of a class simultaneously. During this time, he was selected to be a part of a commission that produced a report, "The Church and Higher Education", to the Presbyterian Synod of North Carolina, which was completed in July 1955. He was a member of the North Central Association of Colleges and Secondary Schools's commission on colleges universities and the board of directors of Kemper Military School in Boonville, Missouri; he was elected to the latter position on May 28, 1956. In his final week at Stephens, the college announced a 40-year campus relocation project at a total cost of $12 million (equivalent to $134 million in 2025) with the eventual goal of abandoning its current facilities and constructing new instructional, residential, and athletic buildings at a site near U.S. Route 63.

In 1957, he was contacted by Don Campbell, a friend of his and chairman of the trustee presidential search committee at Centre, regarding the school's vacant presidency. He was offered the job, and despite having turned down a similar offer from what he later called a "stronger" college, he accepted the position at Centre. He was replaced by dean of instruction James G. Rice as acting president upon his departure on November 11, 1957.

=== President of Centre College, 1957–1981 ===
Spragens was announced as Centre's next president by their board of trustees on August 22, 1957. On November 11, he began his term as the 17th president of Centre College. In doing so, he became the fourth president in the college's history who was not an ordained minister, the first who was not a member of the clergy at all, and the youngest in the college's history. He spent his first full day on campus the following day, when he presided over his first faculty meeting, and addressed the student body for the first time at a convocation on November 19. He was formally inaugurated in a ceremony on the morning of April 21, 1959, which included an inaugural address given by Stanford president Wallace Sterling.

In 1959, he introduced a ten-year plan with the goals of increasing the college's enrollment (with the specific goal of 750 students), adding to the faculty, and increasing the number of majors offered by the college. The following year, the college announced a $6.5 million (equivalent to $72.5 million in 2025) fundraising campaign in celebration of Centre's 150-year anniversary, a marked increase from the $20,000 (equivalent to $223,183 in 2025) to $25,000 (equivalent to $278,979 in 2025) typically raised every year. On June 9, 1958, he received an honorary Doctor of Letters degree from Westminster College, which was conferred upon him at their commencement ceremony. After beginning his term, he immediately declared that the school would move towards full integration and not discriminate by race when determining admissions, and the college admitted its first black student when Timothy Kusi, a Ghanaian student who transferred from Kentucky State College (now Kentucky State University), enrolled in 1962. This change was received well by much of the campus community. The campus of the former Kentucky College for Women, at the time operating as Centre's women's department, closed that same year, at which point it was consolidated onto Centre's campus, with Spragens presiding over the merger. He hired Shirley Anne Walker, a French language professor who became Centre's first black faculty member at the start of the 1971–1972 academic year.

As football grew more popular at Centre during the late 1950s and early 1960s, Spragens sought to keep the college's priorities on academics rather than athletics. After he was announced as president in August 1957, he said that he would continue the existing policy of lessened emphasis on athletics, saying that they were a "corollary aspect" of the school. His scholarship policy stipulated that financial awards would not be given solely for athletics, but rather to all students based on merit and need. He advocated for the creation of a new athletic association which would eliminate gate receipts; Centre was joined in this association by Washington and Lee University, Southwestern University at Memphis (now Rhodes College), and the University of the South, with Washington University in St. Louis added later the same year as the league's fifth charter member. This association ultimately became the College Athletic Conference (now the Southern Collegiate Athletic Conference) and was formally founded on September 1, 1962. Centre remained a member of the conference until 2011, when they left, along with six other SCAC schools and one independent school, to form the Southern Athletic Association. During the 1960s, Spragens decided to end the agreement under which Centre leased its football field to Danville High School, and underwent a facilities exchange with the local school district by which the Centre women's campus was given to the district and the old Danville High School site was given to the college.

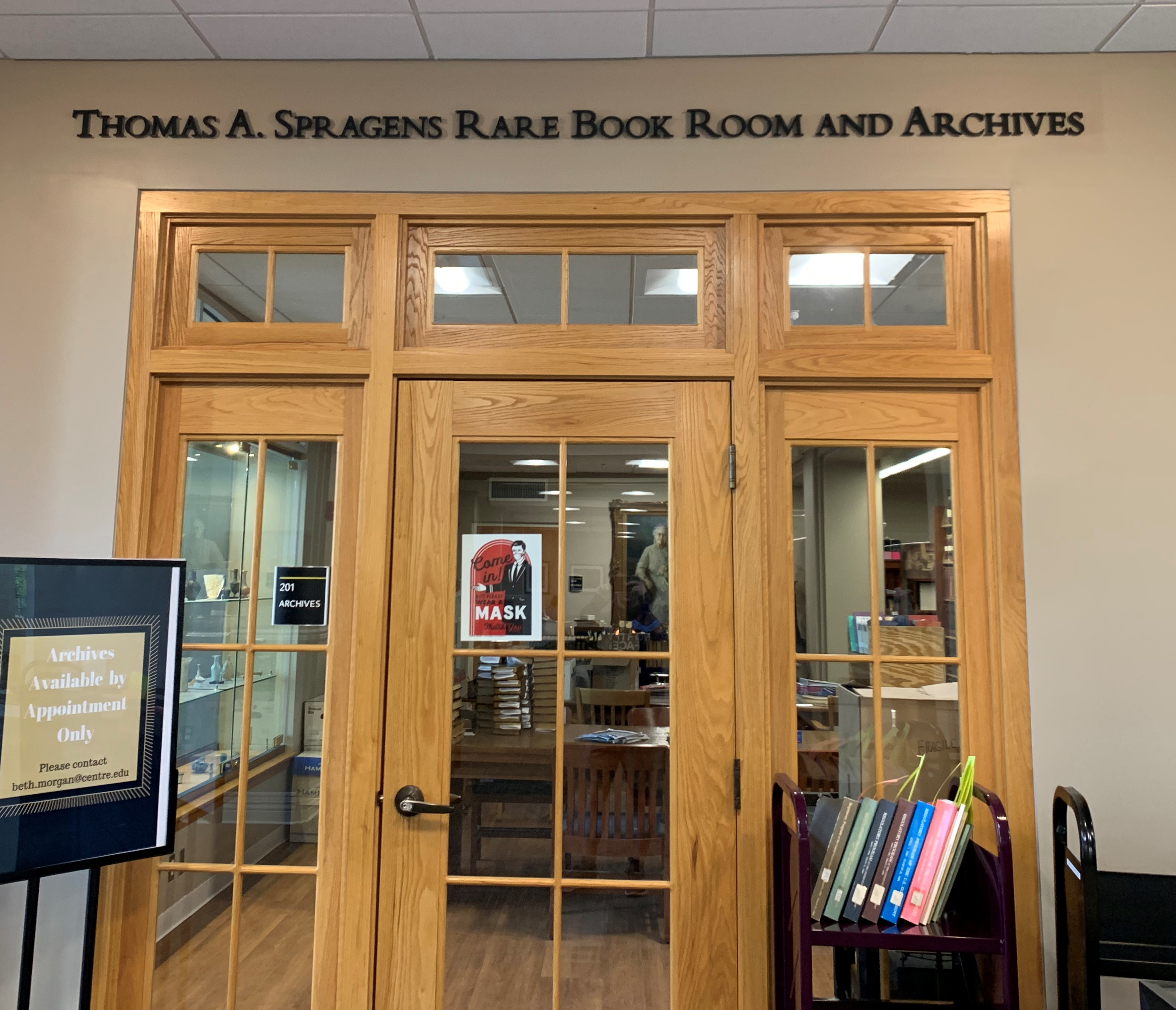
Centre's rare book room and archives, located in the Grace Doherty Library and named for Spragens

Spragens was supportive of peaceful protests held by students on campus and around the city; his "'good citizenship' policy" took effect in the 1960s, and student protests increased in frequency as the decade continued, particularly with respect to racial segregation and the Vietnam War. In December 1966, he introduced a plan under which classes at Centre would be held during four days of the week, rather than five, as part of a trimester system that was in effect for some time beginning with the fall semester of the 1966–1967 academic year. This trimester system, referred to as "The New Curriculum", consisted of two terms of regular length, during which students would take four courses, with a six-week two-course winter term in between. He was selected as a delegate to the 1968 Democratic National Convention, held in Chicago, after serving as the chair of the Boyle County Democratic Convention and attending the state convention. He did both in support of Senator Eugene McCarthy of Minnesota, though McCarthy eventually lost the nomination to Vice President Hubert Humphrey, also of Minnesota. Following the Kent State shootings on May 4, 1970, he declared all classes suspended on May 8, and addressed much of the student body and faculty on the campus lawn.

Many of the changes that took place on Centre's campus during Spragens's presidency were long-lasting. Numerous buildings were constructed or upgraded during his time in office, including the Grace Doherty Library (which took the place of Old Main, which was demolished), the new Young Hall, Sutcliffe Hall, the Regional Arts Center (now the Norton Center for the Arts), Alumni Memorial Gymnasium, fraternity residences, and multiple dormitory buildings. After twenty years of Spragens's presidency, three quarters of the buildings on campus had been constructed or renovated. These upgrades increased the property value of the campus to $21.2 million (equivalent to $74.4 million in 2025) by the time he left office. An effective fundraiser, he led the Fund for the Future campaign, which ultimately raised about $34 million (equivalent to $120 million in 2025) for the college. A chapter of the Phi Beta Kappa honor society (of which Spragens was a member) opened at Centre during Spragens' tenure. In 1961, Centre purchased land from the city of Danville at a cost of $175,000 (equivalent to $1,885,440 in 2025); a federal law that was new at the time allowed the city to start a community development project with funding totaling $2.5 million (equivalent to $26.9 million in 2025) as a direct result. Under Spragens, the college contributed to the city's economy, with one estimate stating that five to ten percent of the city's business revenue was generated by the college during fiscal year 1980–1981.

His presidency ended upon his resignation, which became effective November 16, 1981. Provost Edgar C. Reckard finished the academic year as interim president; Spragens was formally succeeded by Richard L. Morrill on June 1, 1982. He worked as a fundraiser for, and advisor to, the college for six months following his resignation.

During his time at Centre, Spragens was a member of a number of other institutions related to higher education, including the Kentucky Independent College Foundation, Independent College Funds of America, the Association of American Colleges and Universities, and the Southern Association of Colleges and Schools. He was the director of the American Council on Education for three years, and as the director of the Southern University Union for a time. During his presidency, he was selected as part of two commissions, appointed by Governors Bert Combs and Ned Breathitt, to study higher education in Kentucky. On two occasions, he was asked to interview with the search committee for the presidency of the University of Kentucky, but never received a formal offer, and he was contacted by Kentucky State University with a possibility of being their interim president after he retired from Centre. He ended up as a consultant for one year to the newly hired president of Kentucky State, Raymond Burse, a Centre alumnus himself. He received honorary degrees from a number of colleges and universities: Westminster College, the University of Kentucky, the University of Alabama, Berea College, and Kentucky State University, in addition to Centre.

== Personal life and death ==
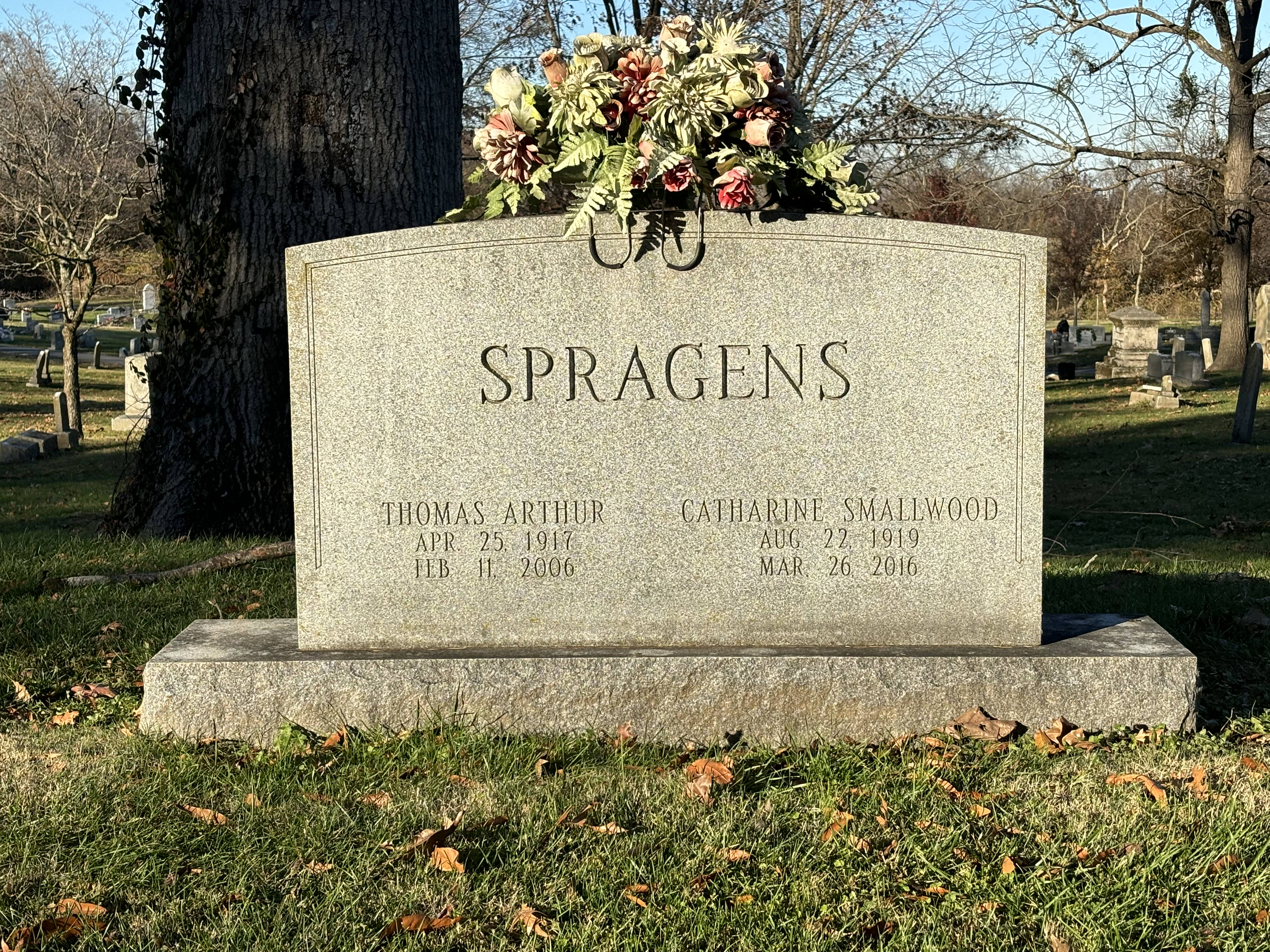
The headstone at the grave of Thomas and Catharine, in Danville's Bellevue Cemetery

Spragens met Catharine Smallwood, a native of Oxford, Mississippi, and an alumna of the University of Mississippi, in the early 1940s and the pair married on May 24, 1941. The couple had two sons, Thomas Jr. and David, and one daughter, Barbara. David, who was their youngest child, graduated from Centre in 1973, during his father's presidency.

In an interview shortly following his resignation, Spragens stated that his personal hobbies included playing tennis and golf, as well as water skiing. He was Presbyterian, and had been an elder in the Presbyterian Church since the age of 29. He was a member of the Phi Beta Kappa and Omicron Delta Kappa honor societies. In 1990, Thomas and Catharine received the Honorary Alumni Award from Centre.

Spragens died on February 11, 2006, in Columbia, South Carolina, at the age of 88. His memorial service was scheduled for March 4, 2006, at the First Presbyterian Church in Danville. He is buried in Danville's Bellevue Cemetery.

== Legacy ==
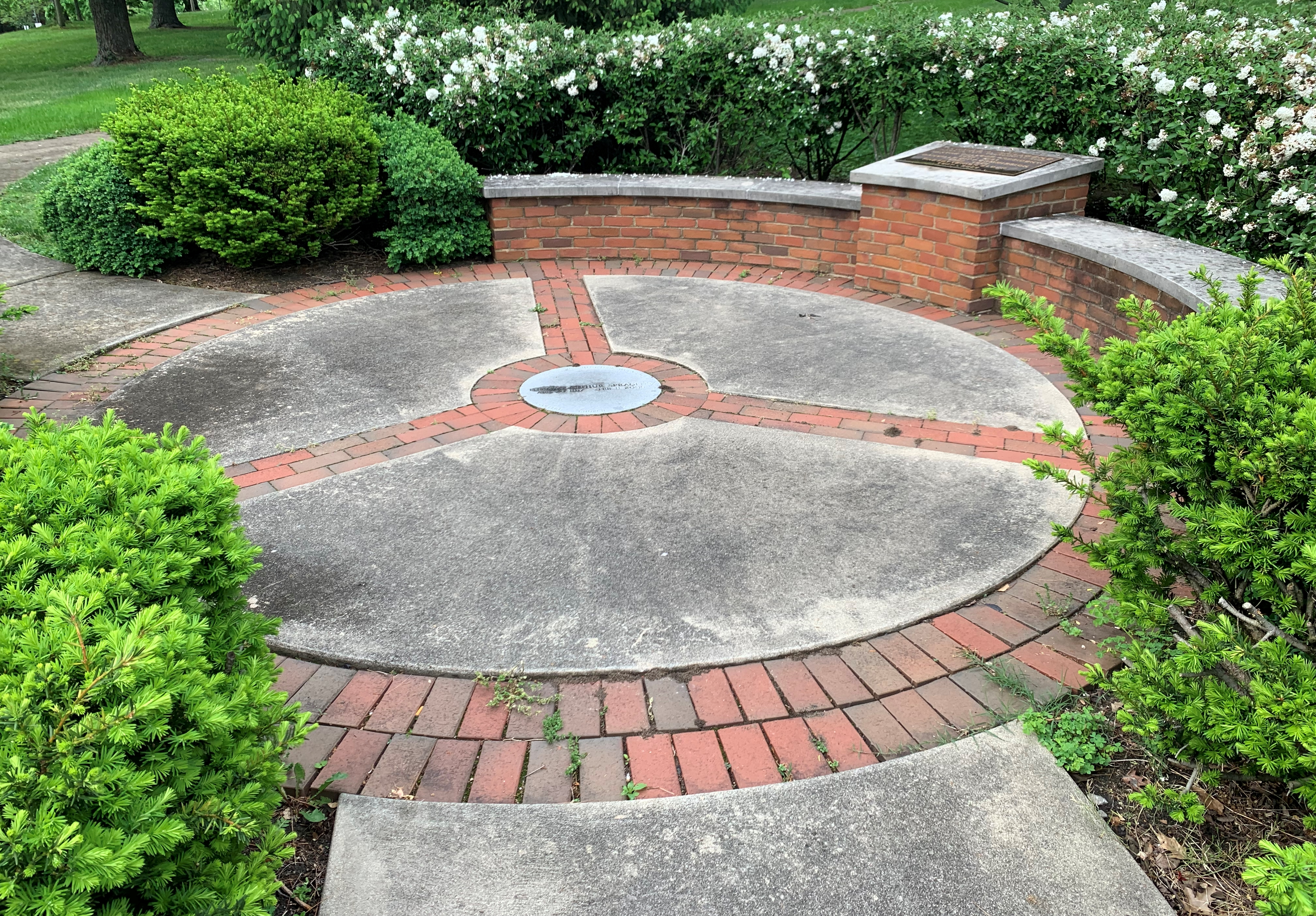
A memorial for Spragens at Danville's First Presbyterian Church, where he was an elder

During his 24-year tenure as president, the college's enrollment nearly doubled, from 380 students to nearly 700, and the size of its faculty followed the same trend, increasing from 38 members to 68. Centre's endowment also grew, from $2.8 million (equivalent to $32.1 million in 2025) to $18 million (equivalent to $64 million in 2025). Three of Kentucky's four Rhodes Scholars at the time of his resignation had graduated from Centre over the previous fifteen years. After his retirement from the presidency he joined the Kentucky Council on Higher Education, the boards of numerous organizations including Shaker Village, Leadership Kentucky, Presbyterian Homes and Services, and Pikeville College (now the University of Pikeville), and was a city commissioner in Danville.

His tenure saw the college become more distanced from the church than in the past, as the portion of the college's budget obtained from the church decreased and chapel attendance became voluntary for students beginning in 1965. Two years later, he was elected moderator of the Northern Synod of Kentucky and recommended that Centre remove many of its remaining ties to the Presbyterian Church. In 1968, Centre withdrew from the Kentucky Synod for financial reasons and the following year it removed its policies which required the president and most board members to be Presbyterian. The effects of this were seen on the student body in the following years, with the percentage of students reporting themselves as Presbyterian falling from 32% in 1967 to 17% in 1971, and the percentage of students reporting themselves as non-denominational rising from 0.5% to 27% in the same time period. His presidency is remembered for his successful fundraising efforts and for the numerous buildings that were constructed. The Thomas A. Spragens Rare Book Room and Archives, located in the Grace Doherty Library at Centre, is named in his honor.

== Notes ==
Academic offices
Preceded by Homer P. Rainey	President of Stephens College; 1952–1957	Succeeded by Seymour Smith
Preceded by Walter A. Groves	President of Centre College; 1957–1981	Succeeded by Richard L. Morrill
