= William Breckinridge =

William Breckinridge may refer to:

- William Campbell Preston Breckinridge (1837–1904), lawyer and politician, U.S. representative from Kentucky's 7th congressional district
- William L. Breckinridge (1803–1876), pastor and educator, president of Oakland College (Mississippi) and Centre College
