= Lewis W. Green =

American minister and university president (1806–1863)

The Reverend Lewis W. Green
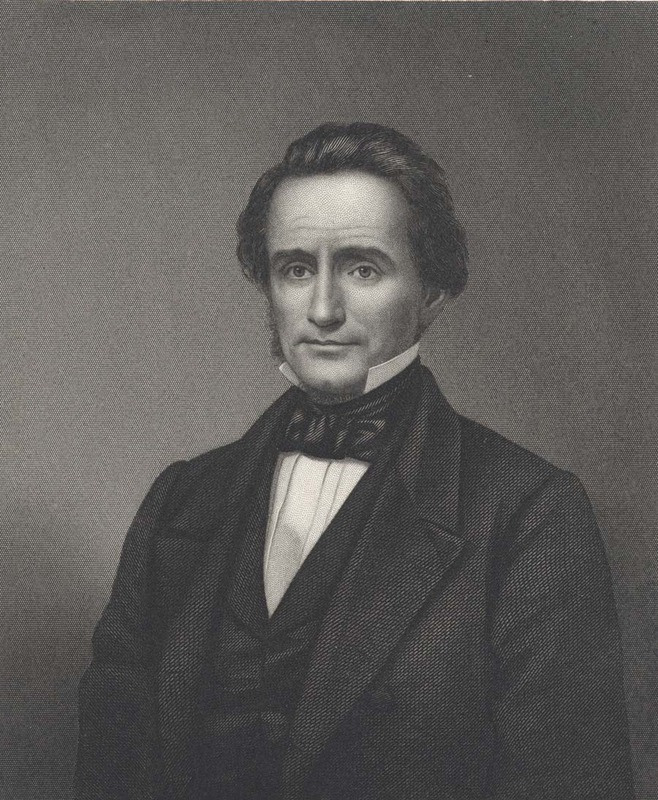

9th President of Hampden–Sydney College
- In office January 10, 1849 – September 1, 1856
- Preceded by: Patrick J. Sparrow
- Succeeded by: Albert L. Holladay

8th President of Transylvania University
- In office November 18, 1856 – January 1, 1858
- Preceded by: Henry Bidleman Bascom
- Succeeded by: Abraham Drake

5th President of Centre College
- In office January 1, 1858 – May 26, 1863
- Preceded by: John C. Young
- Succeeded by: William L. Breckinridge

Personal details
- Born: January 28, 1806 Danville, Kentucky, US
- Died: May 26, 1863 (aged 57) Danville, Kentucky, US
- Resting place: Bellevue Cemetery
- Spouse(s): Eliza Montgomery (m. 1827; died 1829) Mary Fry Lawrence (m. 1834)
- Children: Letitia; Julia
- Education: Transylvania University; Centre College
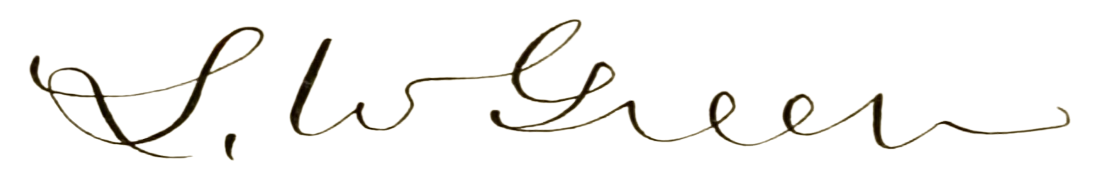
- Signature

Lewis Warner Green (January 28, 1806 – May 26, 1863) was an American Presbyterian minister, educator, and academic administrator. He was the president of Hampden–Sydney College, Transylvania University, and Centre College for various periods between 1849 and 1863.

Born in Danville, Kentucky, baptized in Versailles, and educated in Woodford County, Green enrolled at Transylvania University but transferred to Centre College to complete his education. He graduated in 1824 as one of the two members of the school's first graduating class. He enrolled at Princeton Theological Seminary in 1831 but returned to Kentucky in 1832 before graduating. After one year as a professor at Hanover College, he returned to Centre in 1839. He then left again the next year for a position at Western Theological Seminary in Pennsylvania, where he spent six years. He then went to Baltimore to preach full-time, though he resigned after just over a year and a half due to poor health.

Green was elected president of Hampden–Sydney College in January 1849. He was recruited by numerous other institutions after his eight-year term. Among these institutions was Transylvania, which recruited him to their presidency shortly following the establishment of a normal school by the Kentucky General Assembly. The bill that created the normal school was repealed after a year and a half and he resigned in late 1857. Green was elected president of Centre College that year and entered office in January 1858. After leading the school through the start of the Civil War, he died in office in 1863 from an illness which he caught after helping wounded soldiers. He was buried in Danville's Bellevue Cemetery. He was a member of the Stevenson political family through the marriage of his daughter; as a result, he was the father-in-law of vice president Adlai Stevenson I, the great-grandfather of Illinois governor Adlai Stevenson II, and the great-great-grandfather of senator Adlai Stevenson III.

== Early life and education ==
Lewis Warner Green was born on January 28, 1806, in Danville, Kentucky, the twelfth and youngest child of Willis Green and Sarah Reed. Lewis was orphaned as a young boy—his father died when he was five years old and his mother died two years later—and afterwards he lived with his oldest brother. His first education was in Latin and Greek and he began attendance at a classical school directed by Louis Marshall in Woodford County, Kentucky, at the age of thirteen. He was baptized at Pisgah Presbyterian Church in Versailles, Kentucky, in March 1820 alongside his brother Willis. Lewis fell seriously ill with a fever for several weeks during his second year at the school. At one point he was given only a slim chance of survival, though ultimately he recovered. Afterwards, Green entered Transylvania University and completed the coursework through his junior year but transferred in 1822 to Centre College because of a lack of support by Kentucky Presbyterians for Transylvania president Horace Holley. He graduated from Centre in 1824, becoming one of the two members of the school's first graduating class. Green took brief interest in law and medicine following his graduation, studying the former with his brother, John, and the latter with physician Ephraim McDowell, each for a short time. Green went on to study the Hebrew language at Yale College and enrolled at the Princeton Theological Seminary in 1831, where he was a classmate of Henry Augustus Boardman. He did not earn a degree from either institution as he left upon being elected to teach at Centre.

== Career ==
=== Professor and pastor in Danville ===
Green was first given a chance to enter academia when he was elected professor of Greek at Centre College in August 1831, though he declined the position in order to study at Princeton, where he had just enrolled. He returned to his alma mater in August 1832, when he was elected to teach political economy and belles-lettres. He was licensed as a preacher on October 4, 1833, at Harmony Church in Garrard County, Kentucky, and thereafter preached in Danville, its surroundings, or elsewhere in Kentucky nearly every Sunday. In August 1834, some months after his marriage to Mary Lawrence, he obtained a two-year leave of absence from Centre and sailed with his wife from New York to Liverpool in order to learn more about, and improve his skills in, the ministry; they arrived on September 15, 1834. The pair spent two weeks in London before traveling to Berlin, and Green heard lectures from August Neander and Ernst Wilhelm Hengstenberg. In mid-1835 they traveled throughout Germany and Switzerland and Green spent the following winter in Halle studying under August Tholuck, Karl Ullmann, and Wilhelm Gesenius. Afterwards, the pair went to Bonn and Paris before returning to the United States sometime after December 1835.

Green was offered the pastorate of the Presbyterian Church of Shelbyville, Kentucky, after preaching a sermon there in 1837, though he declined in order to remain at Centre. The following year, he was elected by the Synod of Kentucky to teach oriental and biblical literature at the theological seminary at Hanover College, and he moved to Hanover, Indiana, to accept the new job. Shortly after starting there, he was offered the presidency of Transylvania University in Lexington, Kentucky, in an effort on the school's part to return a Presbyterian to the office, though Green declined so as to avoid negatively impacting Danville and its status as the de facto center of the church in Kentucky. After the 1838–1839 academic year, he left Hanover and returned to Danville. Upon his arrival, he was elected vice president of Centre College and returned to his former positions teaching political economy and belles-lettres. He also became co-pastor at Danville's First Presbyterian Church alongside Centre president John C. Young.

=== Move to Pennsylvania and pastorate in Baltimore ===
In May 1840, Green was called away from Kentucky once again after the Presbyterian General Assembly unanimously appointed him professor of oriental literature and biblical criticism at Western Theological Seminary, on the recommendation of Charles Stewart Todd. Around this time, in the midst of his move from Kentucky, a slave state, to Pennsylvania, a free state, he manumitted the 25 to 30 people he held as slaves, who were technically his wife's property as an inheritance. He originally planned to have them sent to Liberia with the help of the American Colonization Society, but when they were not willing to go, Green freed them and allowed them to remain in the United States. The same year, he received an honorary doctor of divinity degree from Centre and gave an inaugural address in Pittsburgh; the address was well-received, and he received invitations to speak at Jefferson College, Lafayette College, and Miami University over subsequent years. He resigned his teaching position in Pittsburgh in October 1846, which was effective in February 1847. He moved to Baltimore, Maryland, to devote himself to preaching full-time at the Second Presbyterian Church. Shortly after his arrival, he fell ill and became weak, which prompted him to recuse from the position for a time. He ultimately resigned his position effective October 10, 1848.

=== President of Hampden–Sydney College ===
In mid-1848, Green was invited to speak at Hampden–Sydney College; at that time, the trustees were considering him for the school's presidency, which had been left vacant by Patrick J. Sparrow in 1847. On June 1, he was unanimously elected to the position. He began his duties as president near the start of the academic year and formally succeeded Acting President Charles Martin upon his inauguration on January 10, 1849. In a speech to the board of trustees, he called for the school to enlarge its libraries and secure and retain professors as his main and immediate goals. He also promoted the concept of the development of "the whole Man", according to the Hampden–Sydney historian John Brinkley, as a way of campaigning for the college to prioritize well-roundedness of the students. Despite entering the office still suffering from poor health—according to Brinkley, Green told a friend before taking the presidency that he "had come to the college to die"—he quickly recovered and returned to preaching throughout Virginia, including in the chapels of the Hampden–Sydney College church and that of the Theological Seminary. During his tenure at Hampden–Sydney, the school's enrollment and finances both increased. Enrollment jumped from 27 students to 100 after his first year and to 145 the year after. The school's endowment had increased by $80,000 (equivalent to $2,867,000 in 2025) by the time he left office. Further, he spent vacations and time away from the college recruiting potential students and securing additional increases in funding. During Green's presidency, a disagreement between the faculty of the Richmond Medical College (now the VCU Medical Center) and the Hampden–Sydney Board of Trustees, which oversaw them, resulted in the Medical College effectively becoming an independent institution.

Green's teaching responsibilities were largely focused on classes for fourth-year students and included subjects such as evidences of Christianity, mental and moral philosophy, political economy, sociology (then called "history and philosophy of social progress"; John Brinkley wrote that Green was an "American pioneer" in the teaching of this subject), mathematical philosophy, agricultural chemistry, geology, and Ancient Greek philosophy. He was a popular professor and preacher among students. As with much of the faculty, he was a member of a literary society and took part in their debates.

Like they had during Green's pastorate in Baltimore, the leadership of Jefferson College, in Canonsburg, Pennsylvania, reached out to him in an attempt to recruit him to their presidency, though he declined the offer again; he also declined an offer to return to Danville as pastor of the First Presbyterian Church. This became a theme of his time at Hampden–Sydney. The Synod of Kentucky chose him to take a professorship at the New Albany Theological Seminary in 1850, he was reelected to his prior position at the Allegheny Seminary in 1853, and he was the prospective choice for the inaugural chair of biblical literature at the new Danville Theological Seminary in 1854. He declined all of these offers. The exception came in 1856 when Transylvania University elected Green to their presidency. He traveled to Lexington to see the college and was received enthusiastically. The Hampden–Sydney board of trustees were unsuccessful in convincing him to stay—one strategy involved the proposal of a 50% salary increase—and he resigned the presidency of Hampden–Sydney upon his return to Virginia. It took effect on September 1, 1856, four days before the start of the next academic term, by which time he had already moved to Lexington. Albert L. Holladay succeeded him as president but died before he could take office. As a result, John M. P. Atkinson took the position.

=== Return to Kentucky: Transylvania and Centre ===
Green arrived at Transylvania in the midst of major change at the school. In March 1856, the Kentucky General Assembly passed an act which reorganized Transylvania, established a normal school there, and gave the college a new board of trustees. He was the school's first permanent president since the resignation of Henry Bidleman Bascom in 1849. His direct predecessor was the professor James B. Dodd, who had been serving as acting president since that time. When the normal school opened in September 1856, it had an enrollment of around eighty students, and it made Kentucky the eighth state with such a school. Green was inaugurated as president on November 18, 1856. In his first months, he led a campaign in support of the temperance movement. He concluded his first year at Transylvania on June 24, 1857, and the large crowd present at commencement that day was seen by local press as a promising sign that the school might be leaving its recent struggles behind. During this first year, Transylvania's existing academic departments remained through the reorganization and attendance stayed level with 170 total students, including 72 at the normal school, enrolled to begin the 1857–1858 academic year. This changed during the ensuing General Assembly winter session, during which the bill which had established the normal school was repealed by a large majority. The repeal took effect on June 15, 1858. This decision was condemned by many on campus and the Kentucky superintendent of education, who remarked that the move would result in a quarter-century setback for the state's public education. Favoritism during the selection of students and the appropriation of funding for the normal school from the budget of the university at large—which was illegal—were among the arguments that led to the repeal in the legislature. As the now-dissolved normal school was among the main reasons Green had gone to Transylvania, he resigned in late 1857 and formally left the position January 1, 1858. He was succeeded by Abraham Drake.

Green was elected president of Centre College on August 6, 1857, and officially assumed office on January 1, 1858, succeeding John C. Young. He gave his inaugural address on October 14, 1858, in Lebanon, Kentucky, at a meeting of the Kentucky Synod. By April, he was named co-pastor of Danville's Second Presbyterian Church alongside Alfred Ryers. He held this position until the church building was destroyed in a fire and the congregation merged with that of the First Presbyterian Church. Even then, he preached at that church every other Sunday despite not being its pastor. In writing to a friend near the beginning of his term, he considered a plan to retire after six years in the position, with a goal of bringing 300 new students to Centre. Enrollment declined drastically from 1861 due to the Civil War and the proximity of the fighting to Centre; the school's 172 students before the war had fallen to 57 after two years. Confederate soldiers occupied several campus buildings beginning September 27, 1862. On October 9, the day after the Battle of Perryville took place about 12 miles (20 km) from Centre, there were only six students on campus and the faculty decided to cease holding classes and suspend college operations. The college did not reopen until October 27. Classes were held in the new library, a project completed earlier that year, since Old Centre, the college's main building, was still occupied and being used, in part, as a hospital. At one point, nearly 3,500 Union soldiers were situated in Danville. Old Centre's capacity as a hospital was around 150 and the rooms functioning as such were not physically separated from the parts of the building involved with college operations; some students had to pass through autopsies in progress on their way to a professor's office. During this time, Green continued to preach and teach classes in the place of several absent professors, though not without some physical trouble caused by overwork, his weakened immune system, and the conditions at Centre during the war.

== Personal life and death ==
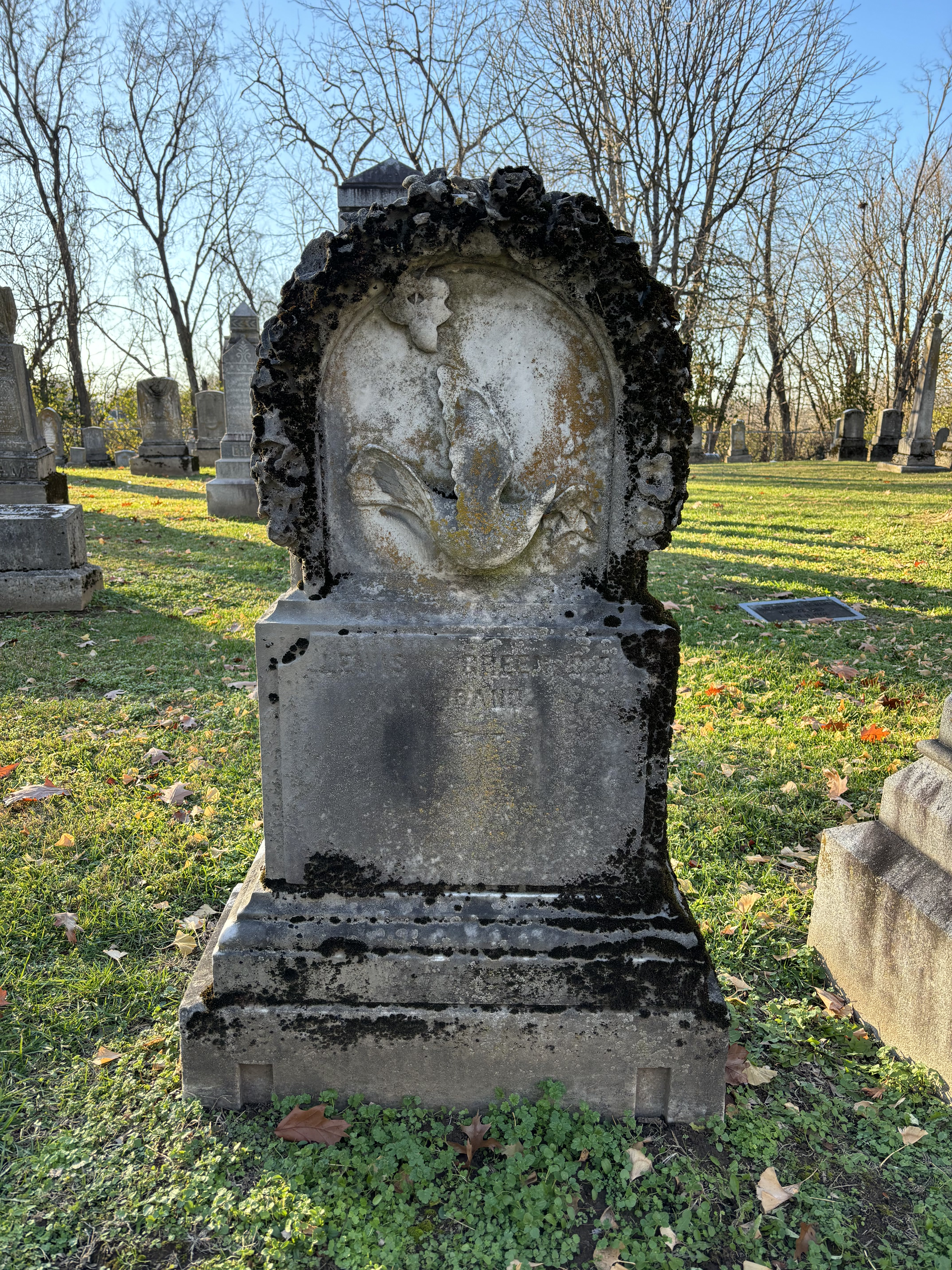
Green's grave at Bellevue Cemetery in Danville

Green married Eliza J. Montgomery, daughter of Congressman Thomas Montgomery, in February 1827. At the time of their marriage, Montgomery was suffering from an "advanced stage" of tuberculosis, according to the biographer Leroy J. Halsey, and the couple were married for slightly longer than two years before she died in 1829. The couple lived on Eliza's family farm before her death. He remarried on April 9, 1834, to Mary Fry Lawrence, with whom he had two children. Sometime after moving back to Kentucky following his term at Hampden–Sydney, Green increased his enslaved workforce; he held ten people as slaves during his time as Centre president. His daughter, Letitia, married Adlai Stevenson I of the Stevenson family, later vice president of the United States. As a result, he was a great-grandfather of Illinois governor Adlai Stevenson II and the great-great-grandfather of senator Adlai Stevenson III. Green's grandson, Lewis Green Stevenson, was named for him.

Green contracted a disease in late May 1863 after attending to sick and injured soldiers. (Note: Brinkley says that Green was ministering to the soldiers, while Weston says that he was helping to treat them and Sanders's The Cost of War just says "helping".) A five-day period of illness included chills, delirium, paralysis, and finally unconsciousness. Throughout, Green was in "extreme agony", according to Halsey. He died as a result on May 26, 1863. He was interred at Bellevue Cemetery in Danville, Kentucky. He was the second consecutive Centre College president to die in office, as Young had also done so. Green was succeeded in that position by William L. Breckinridge.
