= John Boyle (congressman) =

American politician (1774–1834)

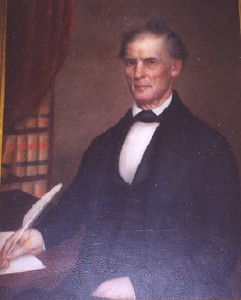
- Judicial portrait of John Boyle, c. 1834.

Judge of the United States District Court for the District of Kentucky
- In office October 20, 1826 – February 28, 1834
- Appointed by: John Quincy Adams
- Preceded by: Robert Trimble
- Succeeded by: Thomas Bell Monroe

Chief Justice of the Kentucky Court of Appeals
- In office 1810–1826
- Preceded by: George M. Bibb
- Succeeded by: George M. Bibb; William T. Barry (disputed)

Member of the U.S. House of Representatives from Kentucky's 2nd district
- In office March 4, 1803 – March 3, 1809
- Preceded by: John Fowler
- Succeeded by: Samuel McKee

Member of the Kentucky House of Representatives from the Garrard County district
- In office 1800

Personal details
- Born: John Boyle; October 28, 1774 Botetourt County, Virginia Colony, British America
- Died: February 28, 1834 (aged 59) Danville, Kentucky, U.S.
- Resting place: Bellevue Cemetery (Danville, Kentucky)
- Party: Democratic-Republican
- Spouse: Elizabeth Tilford
- Children: 10, including Jeremiah
- Education: read law

John Boyle (October 28, 1774 – February 28, 1834) was an American politician and judge who was a U.S. representative from Kentucky from 1803 to 1809. He was chief justice of the Kentucky Court of Appeals (now the Kentucky Supreme Court) from 1810 to 1826, and finally a United States district judge of the United States District Court for the District of Kentucky from 1826 to 1834.

== Education and family life ==
Born on October 28, 1774, at "Castle Woods" in Botetourt County in the Virginia Colony, to the former Jane Black and her husband the patriot Major John Boyle. Boyle had an elder brother Alexander, and four sisters who also survived to adulthood. Their father moved his family to Whitleys Station, Kentucky in 1779, upon receiving land for his patriotic service, where his sons were educated by private tutors and in private schools. Although his elder brother continued as a farmer in Garrard County until his death in 1841 (his son Rufus moved the family line to Lincoln County, Kentucky in 1868 after the farm on the Lexington Pike was devastated by the Civil War), John Boyle then read law with Congressman Thomas Terry Davis and was admitted to the Kentucky bar in 1797.

John Boyle married Elizabeth Tilford, and they had ten children, the first four of whom failed to survive their parents. Their eldest daughter Arethusa Jewell died in 1818 while visiting her parents' home after giving birth to their first and second grandchildren. Their eldest surviving son, James Madison Boyle (1809–1892), moved to Illinois, as did his youngest brother Henry Boyle (1821–1846) and longest surviving sister, Ellen B. Lagow McAllister (1816–1844). Son Marmontel Boyle (1811–1851) died in California. Only sons John Weir Boyle (1815–1845) and Jeremiah Tilford Boyle (1818–1871) remained in Kentucky, the last following his father's example and becoming a lawyer and politician before his Civil War service.

== Early career ==
Boyle began his private legal practice in Lancaster, Garrard County, Kentucky in 1797 and continued until 1802. His political connections also secured for him a post as deputy counselor at law for the Kentucky Court of Quarter Sessions in 1797. Boyle won his first elective office in 1800, representing Garrard County in the Kentucky House of Representatives.

He also farmed a plantation using enslaved labor.

== Congressman ==
In 1802, voters elected Boyle as a Democratic-Republican from Kentucky's 2nd congressional district to the United States House of Representatives, and later re-elected him, so he served in the 8th, 9th and 10th United States Congresses (from March 4, 1803, to March 3, 1809). Fellow Congressmen twice selected Boyle as one of the House managers to prosecute the cases in impeachment trials, first in January 1804 against Judge John Pickering, and, in December of the same year, against Associate Justice Samuel Chase. He was Chairman of the Committee on Public Land Claims for the 9th and 10th United States Congresses.

== Kentucky justice and dean ==
Appointed Governor of the Illinois Territory in 1809, Boyle declined the position. Instead, Ninian Edwards, a seasoned politician and since 1806 Judge of Kentucky's highest court, the Court of Appeals was appointed the territory's governor. Boyle succeeded Edwards as a Kentucky appellate judge (having elected George M. Bibb as their chief), and soon his fellow judges elected Boyle as their chief. Thus, he served from 1809 to 1826, including as Chief Judge from 1810 to 1826.

However, the last three years of his term were marked by the Old Court - New Court controversy, prompted by his 1823 decision invalidating debt relief laws enacted by the 1820 legislature. At midnight on December 23, 1824, the new legislature (also pro-debtor and which had elected former Congressman Joseph Desha as governor), appointed a new Court of Appeals with former Senator William T. Barry (who had argued one of the debt relief cases in 1823) as Chief Justice and John Trimble, James Haggin, Benjamin W. Patton and Rezin Davidge as associate judges (the "New Court"). Desha had campaigned for debt relief, since Kentucky was still suffering the effects of the Panic of 1819, and his party won majorities in both houses of the legislature, but could not find grounds to impeach Boyle and his two fellow judges. Instead, they purported to reorganize the judiciary. The legislature also refused to appropriate salaries for Boyle and his purportedly dismissed colleagues, although on December 24, 1826, the newly elected legislature (dominated by the "Old Court" party) repealed the two-year-old judicial reorganization act, restored the old judges (although Boyle had resigned on November 8, 1826, as discussed below) and awarded them backpay. Boyle would be succeeded briefly as Chief Judge by Bibb (whom he had also succeeded), then by former Congressman George Robertson (who had represented creditors in one of the controversial cases as well as succeeded to Boyle's house).

On May 29, 1829, Boyle accepted the position of Dean of the Transylvania University law school, notwithstanding his federal service (as discussed below), although he only continued in that position for a year.

== Federal district judge ==
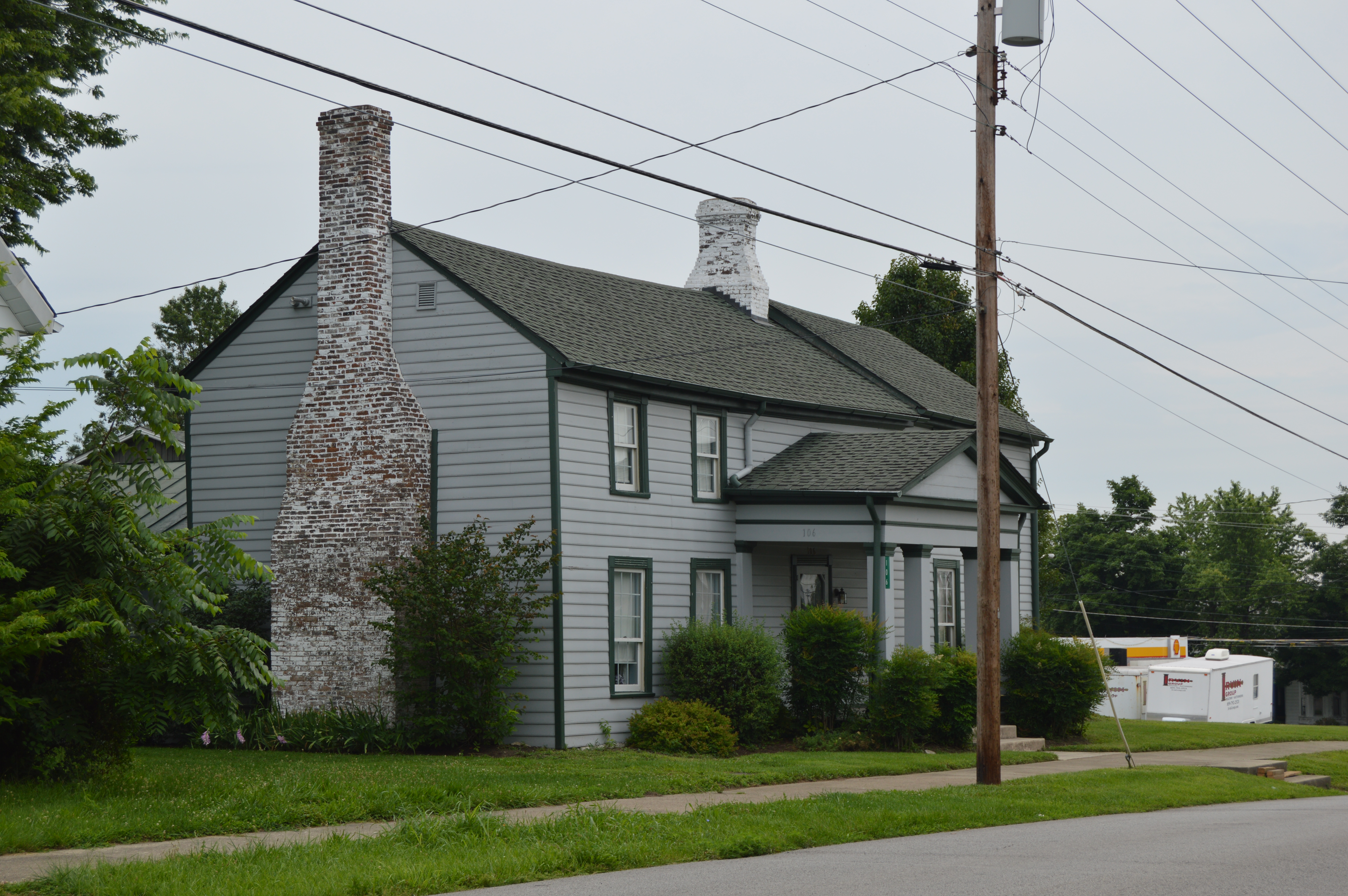
John Boyle's home in Lancaster, Kentucky. This home was at different times owned by Robert Letcher, U.S. Congressman and Kentucky Governor, and George Robertson, U.S. Congressman, and a judge of the Kentucky Court of Appeals.

Boyle received a recess appointment from President John Quincy Adams on October 20, 1826, to a seat on the United States District Court for the District of Kentucky vacated by Judge Robert Trimble. He was nominated to the same position by President Adams on December 13, 1826. He was confirmed by the United States Senate on February 12, 1827, received his commission the same day, and continued as district judge until his death.

== Death and legacy ==
Boyle died on February 28, 1834, near Danville, Kentucky, depressed following his wife's death in a cholera epidemic the preceding June, notwithstanding the presence of many of his children and grandchildren. He was interred beside her in Danville's Bellevue Cemetery.

The double log cabin which he built in Lancaster, Kentucky remains today (as improved by his successors) and was listed on the National Register of Historic Places in 1975, not only because of its age, but also because of its distinguished residents. Boyle sold the house to Samuel McKee, who had read law with him and who also succeeded Boyle in Congress. McKee in turn sold the house to George Robertson, whom he had guided in reading law and who succeeded McKee in Congress and later succeeded Boyle as Chief Justice of the Kentucky Supreme Court. Robertson in turn sold the house to Robert P. Letcher, who became a Congressman and Kentucky governor

Boyle's legacy also included his lawyer son Jeremiah Boyle, who unsuccessfully argued for emancipation of slaves at Kentucky's Constitutional Convention of 1849, and later recruited troops and became a Brigadier General during the American Civil War, and thereafter became active in the booming railroad industry although some of Boyle's descendants would fight for the Confederacy. Furthermore, Judge Boyle taught law to his nephew John Boyle Gordon (the son of his young sister Jane who eloped), who moved to Missouri, where he served in the legislature for several terms, as well as taught law to relatives Oden Guitar and Stanley Matthews, who both became Union Army officers during the American Civil War, then became judges, Guitar in Missouri and Matthews on the United States Supreme Court.

U.S. House of Representatives
Preceded by John Fowler	Member of the U.S. House of Representatives from Kentucky's 2nd congressional district 1803–1809	Succeeded by Samuel McKee
Legal offices
Preceded by Robert Trimble	Judge of the United States District Court for the District of Kentucky; 1826–1834	Succeeded by Thomas Bell Monroe
