= Bellevue Cemetery (Danville, Kentucky) =

Historic cemetery

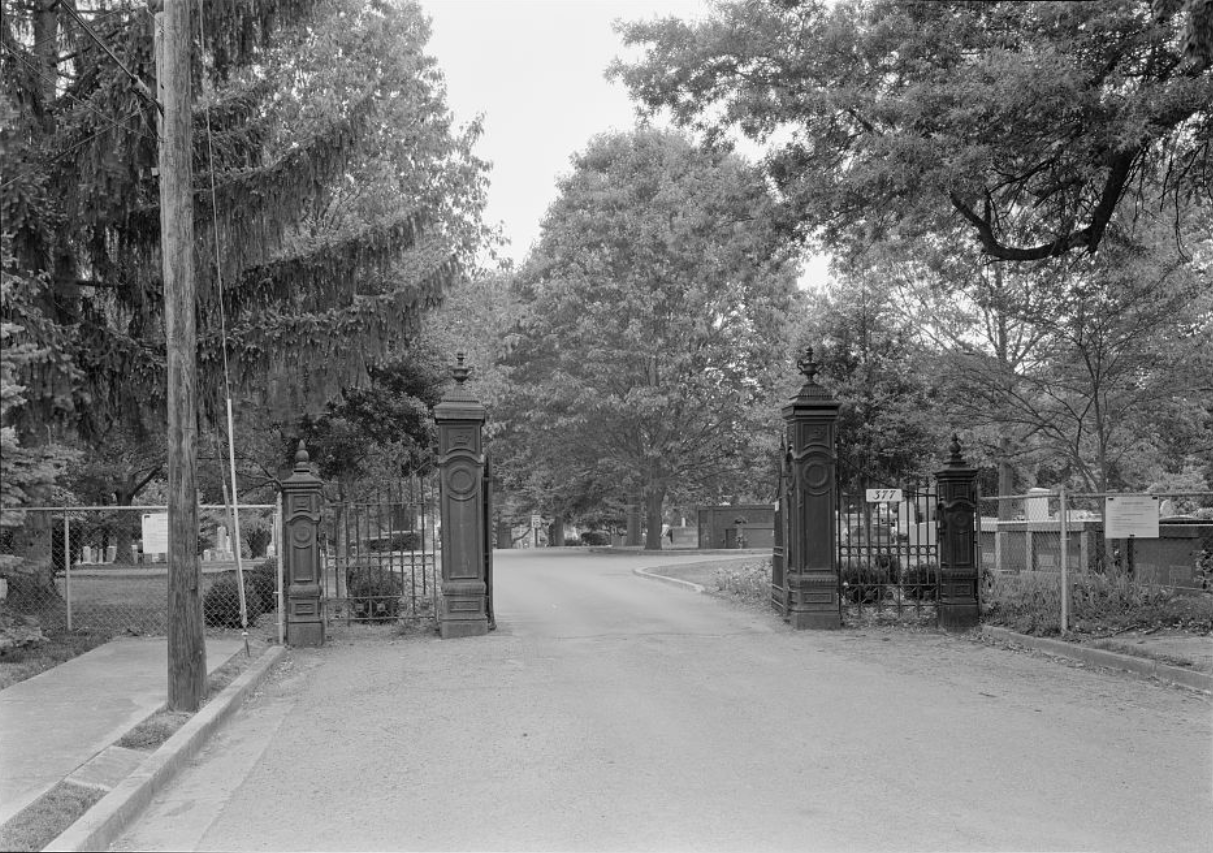
- Photo of Bellevue Cemetery Gates from the Historic American Landscapes Survey
- Interactive map of Bellevue Cemetery

Details
- Established: 1849
- Location: 277 North First Street, Danville, Kentucky
- Country: United States
- Coordinates: 37°39′08″N 84°46′07″W
- Type: Public
- Owned by: City of Danville, Kentucky
- Find a Grave: Bellevue Cemetery

Bellevue Cemetery is a historic cemetery in Danville, Kentucky. It was established in the 1840s and was originally named Danville City Cemetery.

The Danville National Cemetery is located within Bellevue Cemetery. The federal government purchased 18 lots within Bellevue Cemetery at the beginning of the American Civil War. The initial burials were Union soldiers who died at several Danville hospitals and subsequent burials included reinterments from other cemeteries. In 1876, the half-acre, rectangular plot in the northwest corner of Bellevue Cemetery was designated a national cemetery.

A lot in Bellevue Cemetery adjacent to the national cemetery contains the burial of 66 Confederate soldiers.

Bellevue Cemetery is managed by the City of Danville and is open to new burials.

== Notable burials ==
- William Clayton Anderson (1826–1861), U.S. congressman
- Ormond Beatty (1815–1890), seventh president of Centre College
- Joshua Fry Bell (1811–1870), U.S. congressman
- Jeremiah Boyle (1818–1871), Union Army Brigadier General
- John Boyle (1774–1834), U.S. congressman
- Milton J. Durham (1824–1911), U.S. congressman
- Speed S. Fry (1817–1892), Union Army Brigadier General
- Lewis Warner Green (1806–1863), Presbyterian minister, educator and academic administrator
- John Kincaid (1791–1873), U.S. congressman
- Sara Mahan (1870–1966), secretary of state of Kentucky
- William Owsley (1782–1862), 16th governor of Kentucky
- Thomas A. Spragens (1917–2006), 17th president of Centre College
- Albert G. Talbott (1808–1887), U.S. congressman
- Charles J. Turck (1890–1980), lawyer, educator and academic administrator
- John S. Van Winkle (1829–1888), Secretary of State of Kentucky and member of the Kentucky General Assembly
- Margaret Anderson Watts (1832–1905), social reformer
- John C. Young (1803–1857), fourth president of Centre College
- William C. Young (1842–1896), eighth president of Centre College
