= Danville National Cemetery (Kentucky) =

Historic veterans cemetery in Boyle County, Kentucky

- U.S. National Register of Historic Places
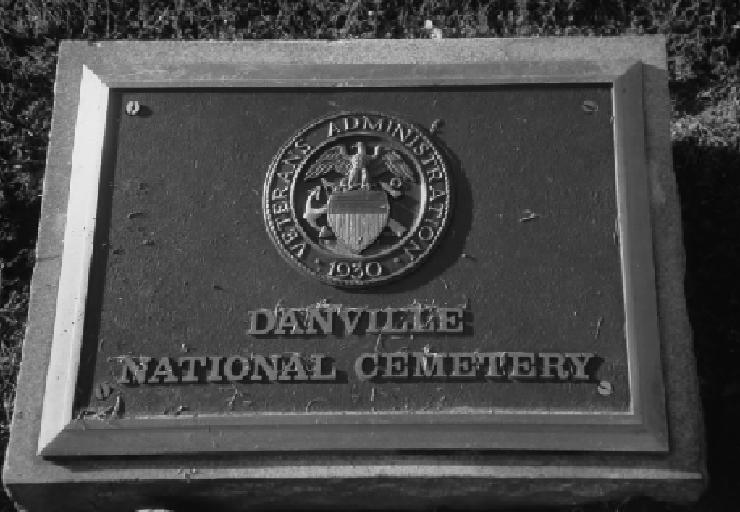

- Location within Kentucky Location within the United States
- Location: 277 N. First St; Danville, Kentucky
- Coordinates: 37°39′10″N 84°46′14″W
- Built: 1862
- MPS: Civil War Era National Cemeteries
- NRHP reference No.: 98000591
- Added to NRHP: 1998-05-29

Danville National Cemetery is a United States National Cemetery located in the city of Danville, in Boyle County, Kentucky. Administered by the United States Department of Veterans Affairs, it has 394 interments and is currently closed to new interments.

== Description ==
The Danville National Cemetery is located within the Bellevue Cemetery in Danville. The national cemetery site is located in the north-west corner and containing 0.3-acre (0.12 ha). It consists of 18 cemetery lots laid off in the form of a rectangle. Near the center of the north side is a bronze plaque inscribed with "Danville National Cemetery" and the seal of the Veterans Administration (now the Department of Veterans Affairs). A square limestone post, with the letters "U.S." inscribed on the upper face, is situated at each corner of the national cemetery. A flagpole, 70 feet high, constructed in 1971, is located just south of the bronze plaque identifying the national cemetery. There are no buildings, walls, or fences within the national cemetery. Graves are marked with upright marble headstones.

== History ==
When the American Civil War started, the federal government appropriated 18 cemetery lots from what was then Danville City Cemetery. The small lot was designated a National Cemetery in 1862. It is divided into six sections, five of which are for the interment of soldiers, and the other for civilians. The original interments were Union soldiers who died while under care in military hospitals in Danville. A Confederate lot in the city cemetery with 66 interments is next to Danville National Cemetery.

During the early months of 1863, Confederate detachments infiltrated among the Union garrisons trying to protect Kentucky. On March 24, 1863, the city of Danville was captured by Confederate General John Pegram and his cavalry brigade, despite stout resistance from Colonel Frank Lane Wolford, commander of the First Kentucky Union Cavalry. Danville was also the site of several hospitals which cared for the Civil War wounded.
