= John C. Young (pastor) =

American educator and pastor (1803–1857)

The Reverend John C. Young
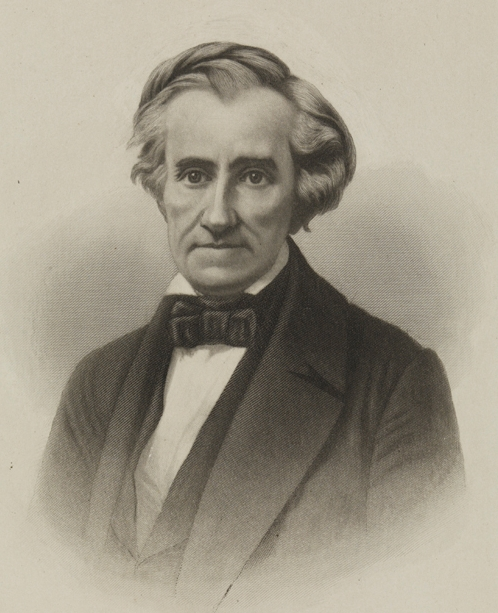
- 1890 portrait

4th President of Centre College
- In office November 18, 1830 – June 23, 1857
- Preceded by: Gideon Blackburn
- Succeeded by: Lewis W. Green

Personal details
- Born: August 12, 1803 Greencastle, Pennsylvania, U.S.
- Died: June 23, 1857 (aged 53) Danville, Kentucky, U.S.
- Resting place: Bellevue Cemetery
- Spouses: Frances Breckinridge (m. 1829; died 1837); Cornelia Crittendon (m. 1839)
- Children: 10, including William
- Education: Columbia College; Dickinson College (AB, 1823); Princeton Theological Seminary (DD, 1828)

John Clarke Young (August 12, 1803 – June 23, 1857) was an American educator and pastor who was the fourth president of Centre College in Danville, Kentucky. A graduate of Dickinson College and Princeton Theological Seminary, he entered the ministry in Lexington, Kentucky, in 1828. He accepted the presidency of Centre College in 1830, holding the position until his death in 1857, making him the longest-serving president in the college's history. He is regarded as one of the college's best presidents, as he increased the endowment of the college more than five-fold during his term and increased the graduating class size from two students in his first year to forty-seven in his final year.

Continuing to preach while in office, Young accepted the pastorate of the Danville Presbyterian Church in 1834 and founded the Second Presbyterian Church in Danville in 1852. He was a respected member of the church and was elected moderator of the Presbyterian Church's General Assembly in 1853. He published several sermons and speeches as part of this work, including one about temperance and several in support of the gradual emancipation of slaves.

Young is the namesake of several facets of the college today, including Young Hall and the John C. Young Scholars Program. He was the father of William C. Young, who later became Centre's eighth president.

== Early life and education ==
Young was born on August 12, 1803, in Greencastle, Pennsylvania, to John Young and Mary Clarke Young. He was the youngest child and an only son. As his father died while John was still an infant, he was raised almost entirely by his mother and educated at home by his grandfather, George Clark.

He moved to New York City to study at a classical school under John Borland, described as an "eminent teacher in the city of New York", before going to college. His uncle, the seven-term U.S. House Clerk Matthew St. Clair Clarke, offered to mentor him in a law-based profession, but he declined and decided to follow his father into the ministry. Young enrolled at Columbia College (now Columbia University), where he spent three years. He eventually transferred to Dickinson College in his native Pennsylvania, and he graduated with honors in 1823. He spent two years after graduation in New York, teaching algebra at the classical school he attended for the first and serving as an assistant to the professor of mathematics at Columbia for the second. In 1825, he enrolled at Princeton Theological Seminary, where he spent three years studying theology, specifically the interpretation of the Bible based upon the principles of Scottish common sense realism. He also tutored students at the College of New Jersey (now Princeton University). He graduated from Princeton Theological Seminary with a Doctor of Divinity degree in 1828.

== Career ==
=== Early career and inauguration ===
After he received a license to preach from the Presbytery of New York on March 7, 1827, Young's career in the ministry began following his graduation from Princeton. In 1828, he moved to Lexington, Kentucky, where he was appointed to the pastorate of McChord Presbyterian Church (now Second Presbyterian Church), founded in 1815 by James McChord, who was later elected as the first president of Centre College in Danville, Kentucky.

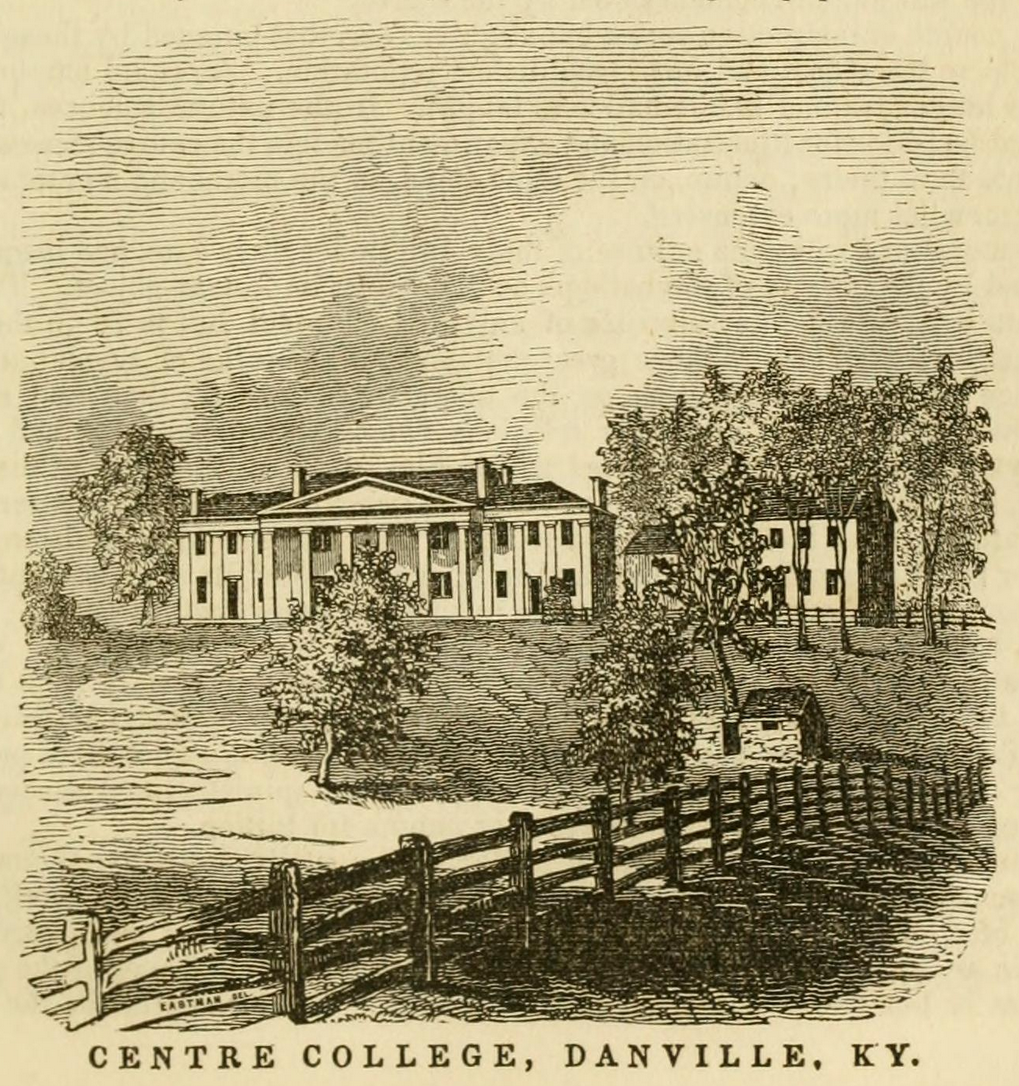
Lewis Collins (1847), Centre College. Young lived in the president's house on the right.

Centre's presidency became vacant in October 1830 when Gideon Blackburn resigned the office. At the recommendation of Archibald Alexander, principal of Princeton Theological Seminary, the college's trustees offered Young the position in a unanimous vote. He accepted and was inaugurated as the fourth president of Centre College on November 18, 1830, at the age of 27.

=== President of Centre College ===
Young inherited a college described by a Centre historian as "small and poor"; it was one which had graduated just 24 or 25 students over the course of its eleven-year history. His primary duty as president was raising funds, which the college desperately needed. Early in his presidency, he went to New York in an attempt to do so, and was successful in raising $6,000 (equivalent to $181,000 in 2025) to sponsor two new professors. He also succeeded in raising money from residents of Danville and other parts of Kentucky. He served on the college faculty as a professor of logic and moral philosophy, and taught belles-lettres and political economy when those positions were unfilled. After the conclusion of his first academic year as president, he delivered the commencement address to the senior class on September 22, 1831.

The curriculum during Young's tenure consisted of classics, mathematics, natural science and history, "taught within a Christian framework". The college catalogue from 1866 notes that each day of classes began with the "worship of God" and that religious instruction and sermons, held on the first Monday of each week, were required for all students. He became concerned with the behavior of the students as his tenure progressed; in an 1845 report to the Board of Trustees, he made note of the increased rate of drunkenness among the students and noted "[the College] has been in a worse condition in respect to good order than it has ever been since I have been connected with it". While a member of Centre's faculty, he was elected to membership of the Beta Theta Pi fraternity; this practice of electing members of a college's board of trustees or faculty was relatively common in the fraternity at the time. Centre graduated a fair proportion of its first notable alumni during his time in office; the class of 1855 alone consisted of John Y. Brown, Thomas Theodore Crittenden, Boyd Winchester, and William Campbell Preston Breckinridge. Other graduates during his term included John C. Breckinridge (1838), John Christian Bullitt (1849), John Marshall Harlan (1850), and Andrew Phelps McCormick (1854).

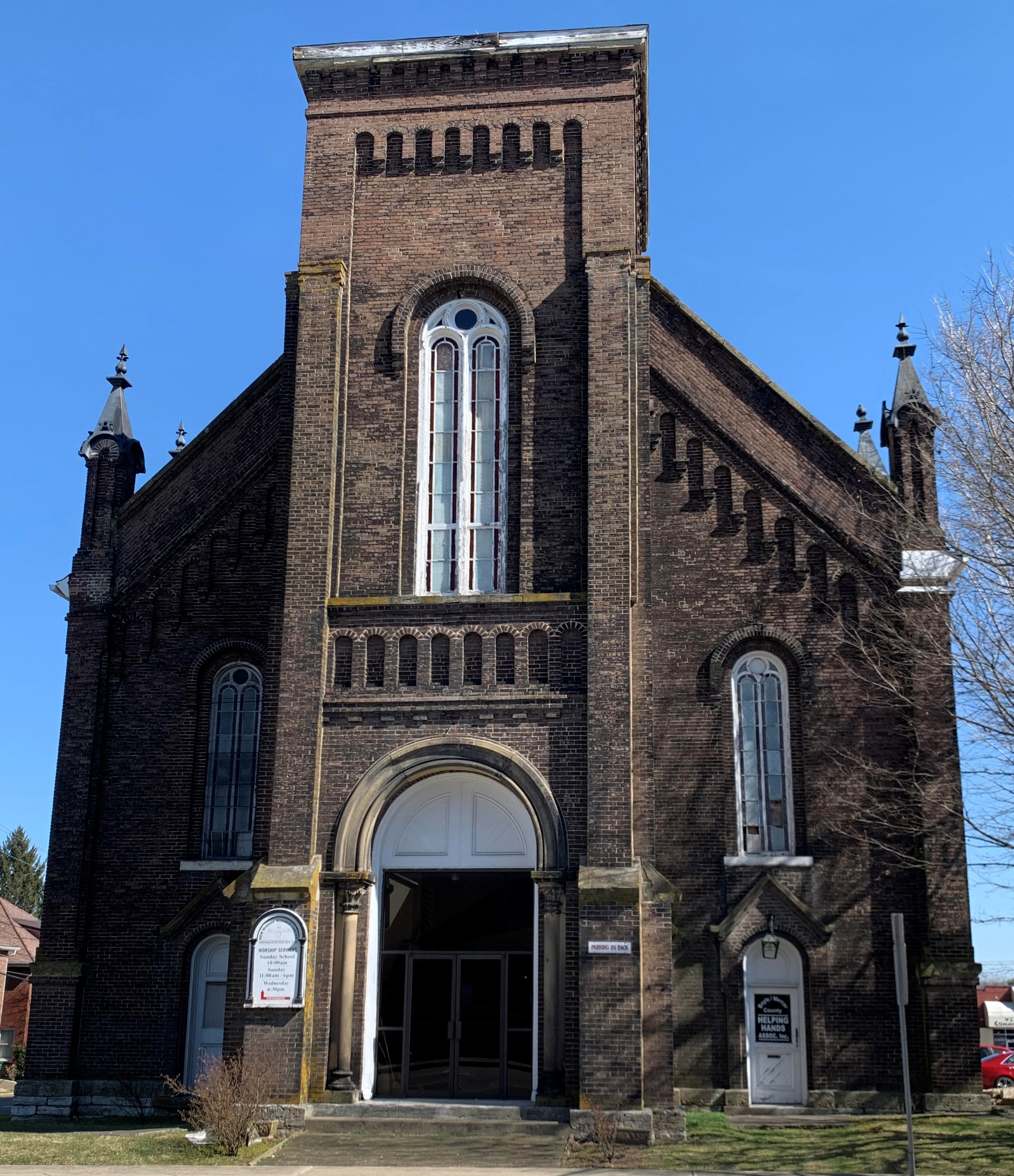
The building that hosted Danville's Second Presbyterian Church, which Young founded in 1852, closed in 1969.

=== Ministry and involvement with the Presbyterian Church ===
In 1834 Young became the pastor of the Danville Presbyterian Church, which served students and the town at large. He was popular with his congregation, which grew in size rapidly. A few years later, the Presbyterian Church found itself embroiled in the Old School–New School controversy, an 1837 schism that split the church into "Old School" traditional Calvinist theological conservatives and "New School" revivalists. He was a part of the "Old School", as were the Synod of Kentucky, many other southern synods, and both of Danville's Presbyterian Churches at which he had preached. Around this time he was offered the presidency at Transylvania University due to his successes in Danville, though he ultimately opted to stay at Centre. In 1852, the congregation had outgrown the building, and he founded a second church, the Second Presbyterian Church, to accommodate the many students that attended. The church remained operational until 1969, when the building was vacated and the congregations joined at the original First Presbyterian Church.

Young was among the delegates from the Synod of Kentucky to the 1853 General Assembly of the "Old School" Presbyterian Church, held in Philadelphia. On May 20, 1853, the second day of the meeting, he was elected to the office of moderator, earning the bare minimum number of votes necessary for a majority, 126 out of an available 251, and winning election on the first ballot. Commenting on his performance as moderator, a correspondent from The New York Times noted that he was "of decided ability". On May 23, he and the other delegates from the Synod of Kentucky petitioned the General Assembly for $60,000 (equivalent to $2,322,000 in 2025) to be put towards land and trusts to build a "Seminary of the first class" in "the West", with a plot of "ten or more acres" in Danville being named as a specific location. This seminary opened in Old Centre in 1853 as the Danville Theological Seminary and moved to downtown Danville, in Constitution Square, the following year.

== Personal life and death ==
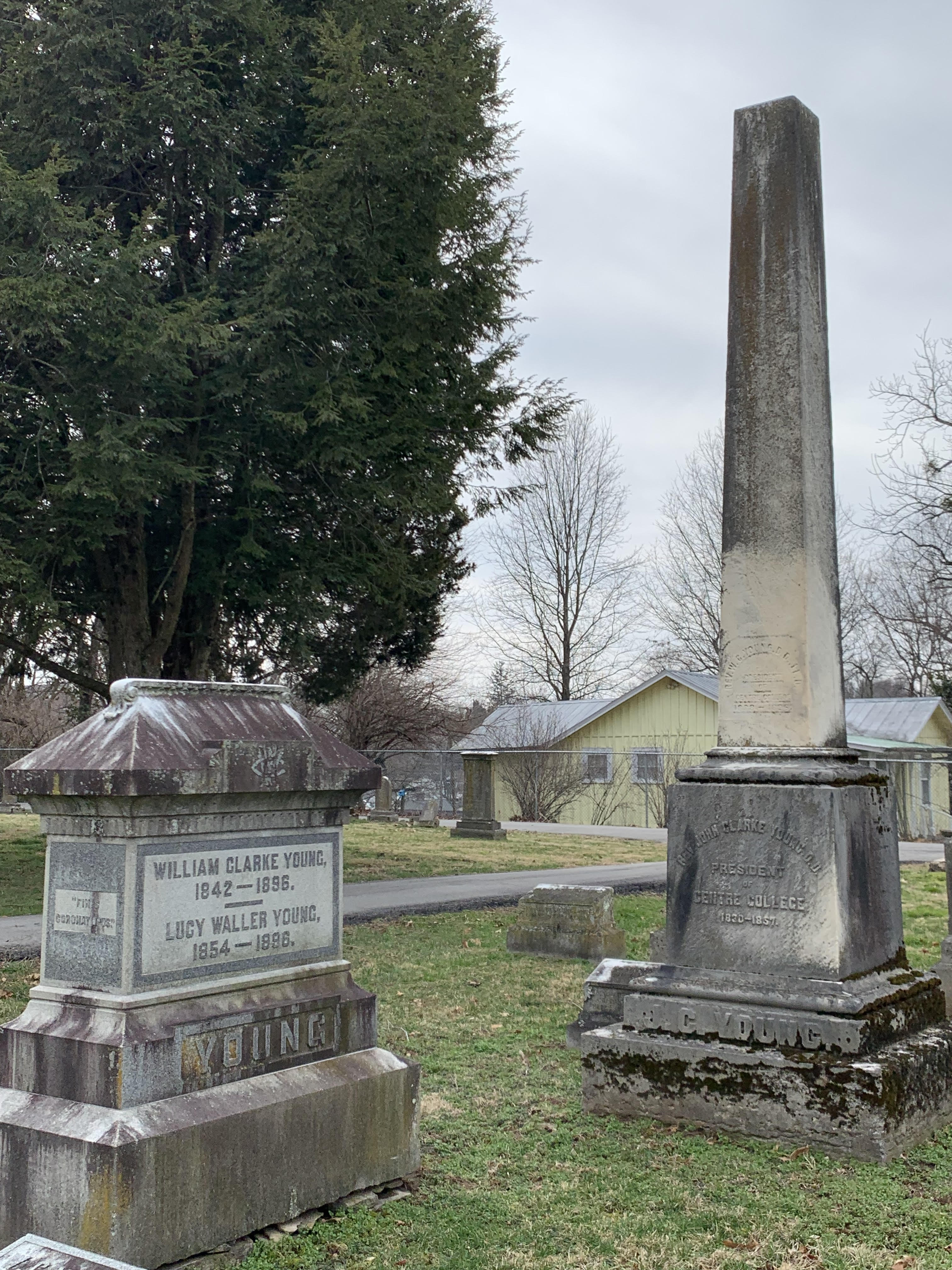
Young's grave (right) alongside the grave of his son, William, at Bellevue Cemetery in Danville

Young married Frances Breckinridge, the sister of Centre graduate and later Vice President John C. Breckinridge, on November 3, 1829. The couple had four daughters between 1831 and 1837. After Frances' death on November 2, 1837, Young remarried to Cornelia Crittenden, the daughter of Governor John J. Crittenden, in 1839. The pair remained married until his death. The couple had six children between 1841 and 1849, including William C. Young, who graduated from Centre in 1859 and became Centre's eighth president in 1888.

Young suffered from poor health for the last several years of his life. Upon arriving at Centre in 1854, future college president William L. Breckinridge said in a letter to his father, "Dr. Young looks badly – the rest look well". Young died at 11:00 a.m. on June 23, 1857, at the age of 53. The cause of death was ultimately determined to have been stomach disease, which led to a hemorrhage. At the time of his death, he still held the presidency of the college. At his funeral, Robert Jefferson Breckinridge delivered the eulogy. Young was buried at Bellevue Cemetery in Danville; his son, William, was eventually buried next to him. His successor to the presidency was the Rev. Lewis W. Green, who was a faculty member for much of Young's time at the college. Green was elected to the position in August 1857 and began his term as president on January 1, 1858.

At the time of his death, Young was working on The Efficacy of Prayer, a treatise described by The Evangelical Repository as "worthy of the subject and the author". The work was published posthumously by the Presbyterian Board of Publishing. Young had given and published many speeches, essays, and sermons over the course of his life, including a speech about temperance, a speech at the inauguration of the professors at the Danville Theological Seminary, and a sermon entitled "On the Sinfulness, Folly and Danger of Delay".

Young was a proponent of the gradual emancipation of slaves and gave several speeches advocating for it as a more moderate and reasonable alternative to immediate abolitionism; he also debated this subject at speaking engagements in Danville, Harrodsburg, and Garrard County with persons including the Presbyterian lawyer George Blackburn Kincaid and president James Shannon of Bacon College. Young was a slaveholder himself and freed some of his own slaves on two separate occasions. Young was a member of an 1835 committee that determined the Synod's position in support of gradual emancipation, and Young himself also supported the colonization of former slaves in Africa; four black members of his congregation emigrated to Liberia under this plan in the early 1850s. He gave multiple speeches on this subject as well, including his Address to the Presbyterians of Kentucky, proposing a Plan for the Instruction and Emancipation of their Slaves (1834) and The Doctrine of Immediate Emancipation Unsound (1835), and proposed the addition of a clause providing for gradual emancipation in the new state constitution in 1849.

== Legacy ==
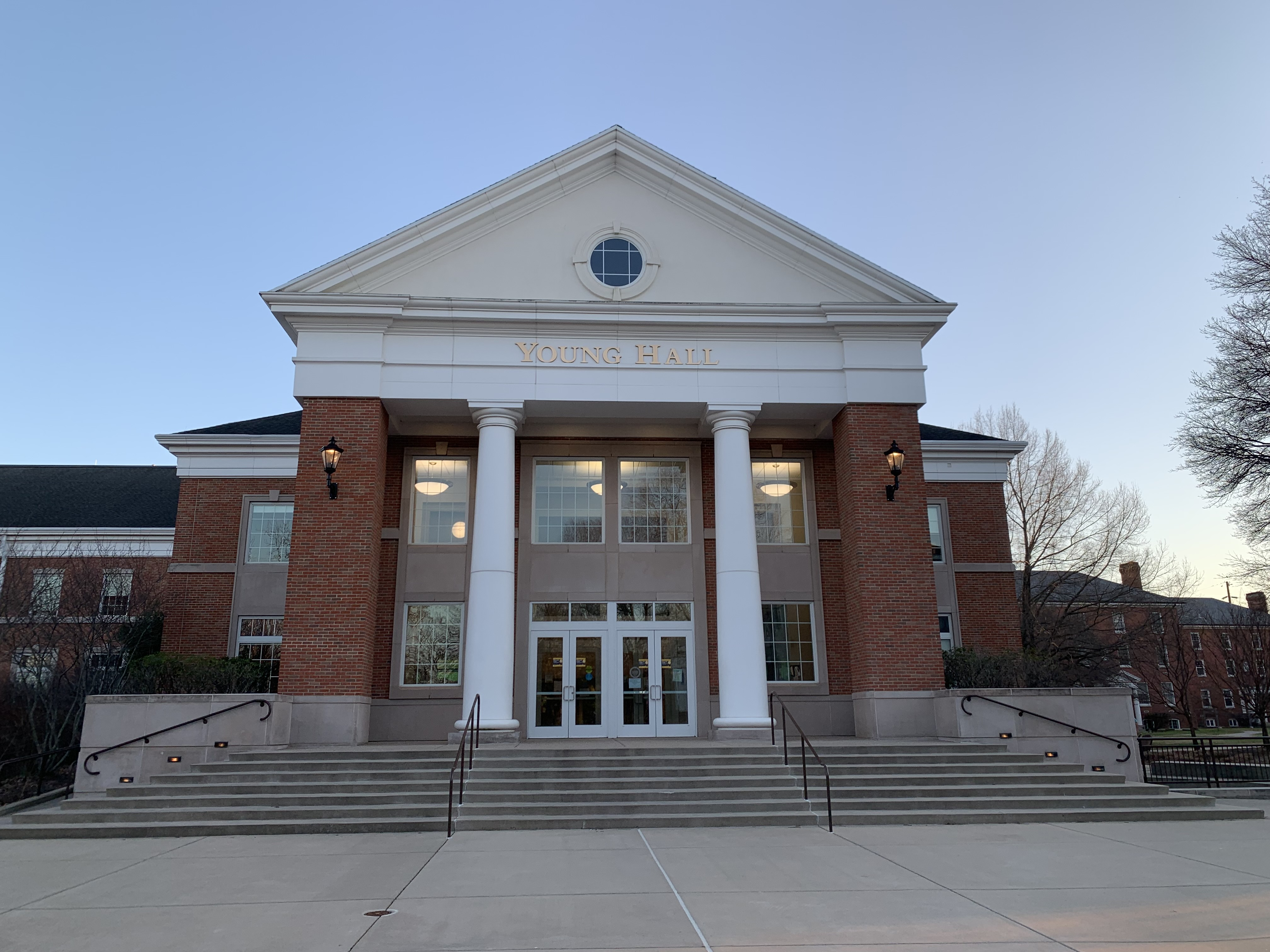
Young Hall, on the campus of Centre College

Among the aspects of Centre College named in honor of Young is Young Memorial Hall, named for John and William, which was dedicated on January 8, 1909, and was the college's first building devoted entirely to science. This building was destroyed in a fire several days before its scheduled demolition, and was replaced by a new Young Hall, which was dedicated on March 21, 1970. The new building underwent renovations and a large addition was dedicated on October 21, 2011. The John C. Young Scholars program at Centre, founded in 1989 as the John C. Young honors program, also bears his name, as does the John C. Young Symposium, where the aforementioned scholars present research and projects which they worked on as a part of the program.

Regarded by many Centre historians as one of the college's best presidents, Young and his administration had a lasting effect on the college. During the course of his term, which lasted nearly 27 years, the college's endowment grew to over $100,000 (equivalent to $3,455,357 in 2025), representing more than a five-fold increase, and the enrollment exceeded 250 students. Young's final graduating class, the class of 1857, boasted 47 members, which was Centre's largest-ever class at the time; this was a significant increase over the graduating class of two students which Centre produced in Young's first year in office. Young's nearly 27-year term remains as the longest of any president in Centre's history.
