= William C. Young =

American minister, educator, and academic administrator

The Reverend William C. Young
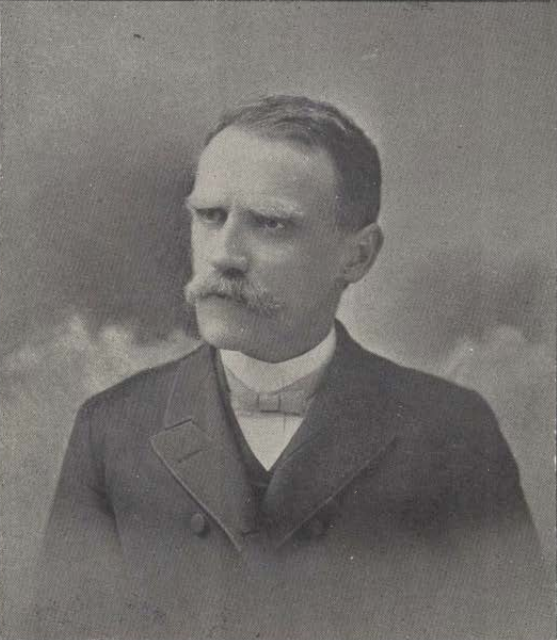

8th President of Centre College
- In office September 5, 1888 – September 16, 1896
- Preceded by: Ormond Beatty
- Succeeded by: William C. Roberts

Personal details
- Born: April 23, 1842 Danville, Kentucky, US
- Died: September 16, 1896 (aged 54) Danville, Kentucky, US
- Resting place: Bellevue Cemetery (Danville, Kentucky)
- Spouse: Lucy Waller (m. 1874; died 1896)
- Parent(s): John C. Young (father); Cornelia Crittendon Young (mother)
- Education: Centre College (AB, 1859); Danville Theological Seminary (DD, 1865)

William Clarke Young (April 23, 1842 – September 16, 1896) was an American minister, educator, and academic administrator who was the eighth president of Centre College in Danville, Kentucky, from 1888 until his death in 1896. The son of Centre's fourth president, John C. Young, William attended Centre and the Danville Theological Seminary, graduating in 1859 and 1865, respectively. He had a 23-year career in the ministry, serving congregations in Kentucky, Indiana, and Illinois, before returning to Centre to accept the presidency following the resignation of Ormond Beatty. During Young's eight-year presidency, the college established a law school, constructed numerous buildings, and retroactively conferred degrees upon some of its first female graduates. Young was also the moderator of the Presbyterian Church General Assembly in 1892, as his father had done some thirty-nine years earlier.

== Early life and education ==
William C. Young was born on April 23, 1842, in Danville, Kentucky. He was the sixth child of Centre College president John C. Young and the second child he had with his second wife, Cornelia Crittendon Young. Young attended Centre during the last years of his father's presidency, which ended with John's death in 1857, and he graduated from the college in 1859. While at Centre, he was a member of the Beta Theta Pi fraternity. He was one of twenty members of his graduating class and one of only two that went on to enter the ministry. For two years after his graduation, he taught at a classical school located in Holly Springs, Mississippi, but returned to Danville in 1861. He then enrolled in the Danville Theological Seminary, and graduated with a Doctor of Divinity degree in 1865.

== Career ==
After his graduation from seminary, Young was a pastor for 23 years in numerous locations, including the Second Presbyterian Church in Covington, Kentucky, from 1866 to 1870; the First Presbyterian Church in Madison, Indiana, from 1870 to 1872; and the Fullerton Avenue Presbyterian Church in Chicago, Illinois, from 1872 to 1879. He left Chicago for Louisville, Kentucky, where he was named the first pastor of the new Central Presbyterian Church. In the intervening time between his stints in Covington and Madison, he traveled "extensively" in Europe and Palestine. On June 19, 1888, the Centre College Board of Trustees elected him to the position of president following the resignation of Ormond Beatty. After initially declining, he eventually accepted the position, becoming Centre's eighth president at the age of 46. He started in the position on September 5, 1888, and was formally inaugurated on October 9, 1889. As the expectation of the time was for the president to serve as a part of the faculty as well, Young taught moral philosophy and history during his time in office.

Young took over a group of six faculty members, who taught subjects including metaphysics, moral philosophy, natural and physical sciences, Greek, and Latin. Tuition that year was US$45 (equivalent to $1,612 in 2025). The first class to graduate during Young's presidency did so in the spring of 1889, and consisted of seven students. That number rose to seventeen the following year, and did not return to being as small as they were during his first year for the remainder of his term. Young made an impact on the school shortly into his presidency by establishing a law school at Centre in 1890, with former Governor J. Proctor Knott selected as its first dean. The law school enrolled 20 students for its first academic year. The following year, Centre boasted 133 full-time students with an additional 101 students in its preparatory academy, the school's largest enrollment in 25 years.

Multiple buildings were also constructed on campus around this time, including the Boyle-Humphrey Gymnasium in 1891, the Breckinridge Hall dormitory (named for Robert Jefferson Breckinridge) in 1892, and a new Sayre Library in 1894. In June 1891, he made a request of the trustees that the college build an additional building for "scientific work", which would eventually be dedicated in 1909 and named Young Memorial Hall, in memory of William and his father, John. During his time at Centre, Young was supportive of the college's athletic programs. He wrote to the college's trustees in 1892 that sports would be "undoubtedly beneficial to the students" if properly controlled, but "[would] provide a nuisance and work evil to all" if not restricted by "stringent rules". Under Young's leadership, Centre awarded degrees to some of its first female graduates, albeit retroactively. All four of Young's half-sisters had studied at Centre and completed coursework (Mary and Caroline in 1849, and Jane and Frances in 1851), though none of them received degrees at the time. As a result, Mary, Caroline, and Jane, the three surviving sisters, were formally awarded Bachelor of Arts degrees by the college in 1891. Additionally, Leila McKee, one of the first two women to graduate from Centre in 1877, was awarded an honorary Ph.D. by the school the following year. Centre's endowment rose to US$265,000 (equivalent to $10.3 million in 2025) and the school added three professorships during his presidency.

In 1892, Young was the moderator of the Presbyterian Church General Assembly, held in Portland, Oregon. This was the same position to which his father was elected for the 1853 General Assembly, held in Philadelphia. Young's performance as moderator was widely praised, with compliments given to his "courage and tact and impartiality". The General Assembly was a particularly eventful one, as it included the church's formal denunciation of historical criticism and the heresy trial of Charles Augustus Briggs.

== Personal life and death ==
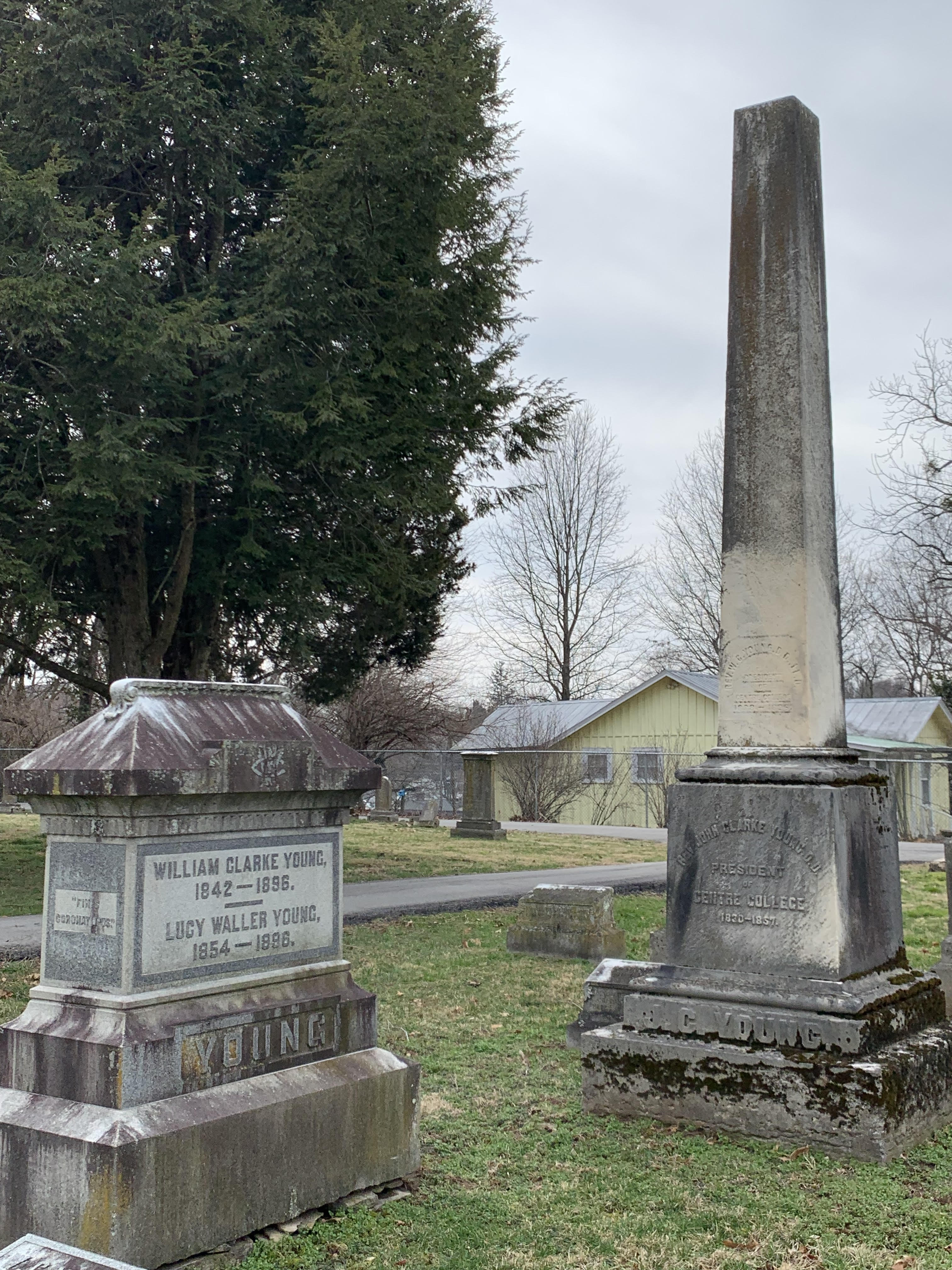
Young's grave (left) alongside the grave of his father, John, at Bellevue Cemetery in Danville.

Young married Lucy Waller in 1874, though Waller was in poor health for much of their marriage, which limited the amount of time they were able to spend together.

Young suffered from poor health for much of the last two years of his life, and attempted to visit various resorts during this time in an attempt to find relief from his ailments, though these efforts were unsuccessful. Young died suddenly at 10:15 a.m. on September 17, 1896, just after concluding an address to Centre students in the college's chapel. He was preparing to hear the students' recitations when he retired to the office of professor Alfred B. Nelson, laid back in his chair and "gave a gasp" before dying. His cause of death was ultimately determined to be a heart attack. He was buried with his wife, who had died just months before him, in Danville's Bellevue Cemetery, adjacent to his father's grave.

John C. Fales, a long-time faculty member and the professor of natural science at Centre for much of Young's presidency, became president pro tempore following Young's death and occupied that position for a portion of the remainder of 1896. Young was formally succeeded by William C. Roberts, who assumed the presidency on June 7, 1898.
