= Jeremiah Boyle =

American politician (1818–1871)

Jeremiah T. Boyle
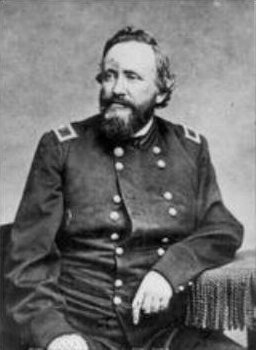
- Brig. Gen. Jeremiah T. Boyle
- Born: May 22, 1818; Boyle County, Kentucky
- Died: July 28, 1871 (aged 53); Louisville, Kentucky
- Burial place: Bellevue Cemetery, Danville, Kentucky
- Military career
- Allegiance: United States of America; Union
- Branch: United States Army; Union Army
- Service years: 1861-1864
- Rank: Brigadier General
- Commands: District of Kentucky
- Conflicts: American Civil War; Battle of Shiloh
- Other work: Lawyer, Railroad President

Jeremiah Tilford Boyle (May 22, 1818 – July 28, 1871) was a successful lawyer and noted abolitionist. He served as a brigadier general in the Union Army during the American Civil War.

== Biography ==
Boyle was born and raised in Mercer County (now Boyle County, Kentucky), and graduated from the College of New Jersey in 1838. He was the son of Judge and Chief Justice John Boyle, for whom Boyle County was named. He then studied law at Transylvania University in Lexington, Kentucky. He became a successful lawyer in Harrodsburg and Danville. Although a slave-owning Whig politically, he argued for a gradual emancipation of slaves as a delegate to the State Constitutional Convention in 1849.

He married Elizabeth Owsley Anderson of Garrard County and raised seven children. For a number of years, he was engaged in business with his brother-in-law, William Clayton Anderson, a former United States Congressman. Boyle supported the Constitutional Union Party in the election of 1860.

At the outbreak of the Civil War, Boyle raised a brigade of infantry for service in the Union Army. He was commissioned as a brigadier general on November 19, 1861. After wintering his troops in Tennessee, he joined Maj. Gen. Don Carlos Buell's Army of the Ohio and participated in the Battle of Shiloh.

In May 1862, he was appointed Military Governor of Kentucky by President Abraham Lincoln, and at times served in command of both the District of Kentucky and District of Western Kentucky. Curiously, the Official Records refer to Boyle's command as the "District of Western Kentucky", although at that time it included all of Kentucky except Western Kentucky, which was assigned to the District of Columbus. Boyle dispatched troops several times to combat incursions and cavalry raids by John Hunt Morgan.

He resigned in 1864 after his son, the Union Army's youngest colonel, Col. William O. Boyle, was killed in action at the Battle of Marion in Tennessee. He had been affectionately known as "the Boy Major."

Following his return home, Boyle speculated in land and became interested in street railways and urged Louisville officials to establish such service. In 1865, he became the president of the Louisville City Railway Company and oversaw the creation of the first mass transportation system in the commonwealth.

He was president of the Evansville, Henderson and Nashville Railroad from 1866 until his death in 1871. He traveled to Europe and secured French investors to back a project to expand narrow-gauge rail service in Kentucky.

Boyle died on July 28, 1871, in Louisville and was buried in Bellevue Cemetery in Danville.

== See also ==
- List of American Civil War generals (Union)
