= William L. Breckinridge =

American educator and academic administrator

The Reverend William L. Breckinridge
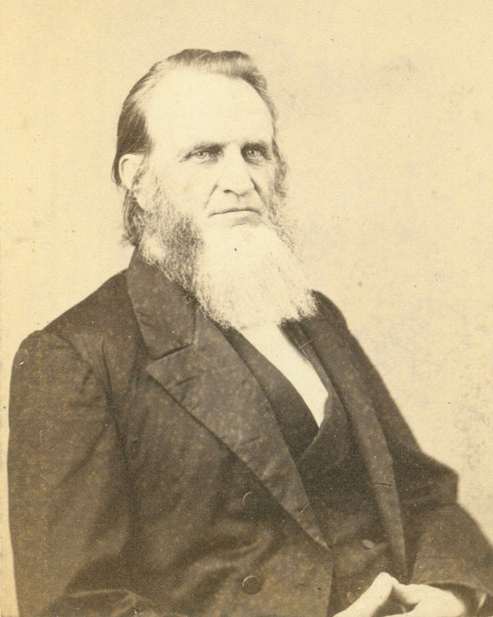
- Breckinridge in 1865

6th President of Centre College
- In office October 15, 1863 – November 1868
- Preceded by: Lewis W. Green
- Succeeded by: Ormond Beatty

4th President of Oakland College
- In office 1860–1861
- Preceded by: James Purviance
- Succeeded by: Joseph Calvin

Personal details
- Born: William Lewis Breckinridge; July 22, 1803 near Lexington, Kentucky, U.S.
- Died: December 26, 1876 (aged 73) Cass County, Missouri, U.S.
- Resting place: Cave Hill Cemetery, Louisville, Kentucky, U.S.
- Spouses: Frances Prevost (m. 1824, died); Sarah Ann Garnett (m. 1873)
- Children: 12
- Relatives: Breckinridge family
- Education: Transylvania University
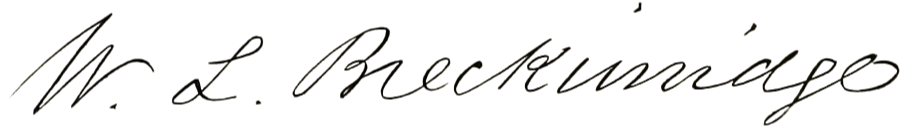
- Signature

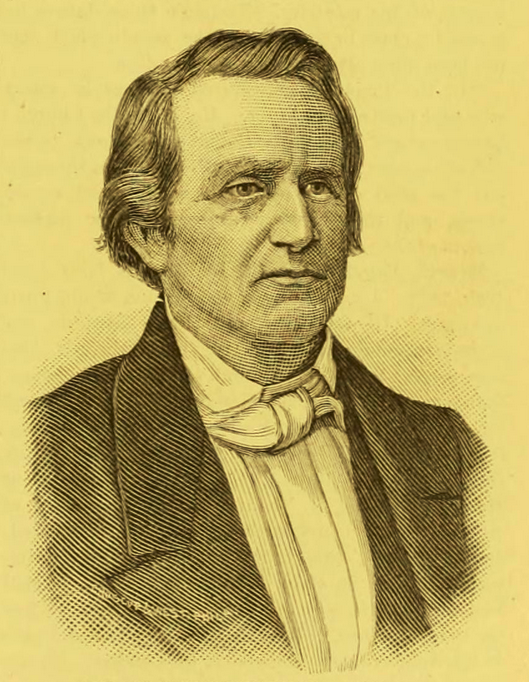
A lithograph of Breckinridge published in 1884, about eight years after his death.

William Lewis Breckinridge (July 22, 1803 – December 26, 1876) was an American pastor and educator. The son of Senator John Breckinridge, he was born near Lexington, Kentucky, and attended college at Transylvania University. Early in his career, he became an emancipationist, and he entered academia in 1831 when he began teaching ancient languages at Centre College in Danville, Kentucky. He was pastor of the First Presbyterian Church in Louisville, Kentucky, from 1836 to 1858, and was moderator of the 1859 Presbyterian Church (Old School) General Assembly. He was president of Oakland College near Rodney, Mississippi, for one year prior to the outbreak of the Civil War, and afterwards he spent five years as president of Centre College.

== Early life and education ==
William Lewis Breckinridge, a member of the "prominent" Breckinridge family, was born on July 22, 1803, near Lexington, Kentucky. He was the eighth child of John Breckinridge and Mary Hopkins Cabell; John was a sitting U.S. senator at the time of William's birth and later became U.S. attorney general. William joined his family's church at the age of 15 and he attended Transylvania University in Lexington. In April 1827, he and several members of his family, including his mother, organized Mt. Horeb Presbyterian Church in Lexington.

== Career ==
=== Pastor, emancipationist, and teacher ===
In the early to mid-1820s, Breckinridge and several of his brothers became vocal proponents of antislavery, aligning themselves in the minority; the abolitionist James G. Birney wrote that the men "had disqualified themselves from political usefulness" as a result. Breckinridge was among the organizers of the Kentucky Colonization Society, whose goal was to emancipate slaves and then provide transport for them back to Africa. In 1849, he attended the Friends of Emancipation state convention, held in Frankfort, along with his brother Robert, Cassius Marcellus Clay, John C. Young, and Walter Newman Haldeman. There, he proposed an amendment to the state constitution which would abolish slavery using gradual emancipation and colonization which was unsuccessful as it was seen by many as too radical; the proposal that ultimately passed was similar in message but specified that there would be a delay before any plans which would bring about emancipation went into effect. He attended a meeting of the American Colonization Society in Louisville the same year, where he gave an address and was a part of a committee which advocated revision of the meeting's resolutions because they did not specifically include provisions for colonization. After the revised resolution passed, he spoke for an hour in favor of the cause of emancipation. Additionally, he was successful in convincing The Louisville Democrat to publish opinions in support of abolitionism; this was the first time the newspaper had done so. He was active in his advocacy against slavery as well and spoke in Shelbyville, Lexington, Brunerstown, Jeffersontown, and Louisville throughout 1849, the last of which was a debate against the lawyer William Christian Bullitt. In their efforts, William and Robert developed a rivalry of sorts with Stuart Robinson, a staunch supporter of slavery.

Breckinridge was appointed to teach ancient languages at Centre College in Danville, Kentucky, in 1831. He held this post for five years before he became the pastor of First Presbyterian Church in Louisville, Kentucky on January 2, 1836. The use of a pipe organ in his church was considered controversial by some, including his brother Robert, who threatened to leave the state because he considered the instrument "frivolous". His tenure leading the church included a relocation within his first several years there. The new building was dedicated on July 21, 1839, with a service which he led, focused on Psalm 48. In 1853, he and Robert were elected to the first board of trustees of the Danville Theological Seminary. He held the pastorate in Louisville until he resigned in ill health in 1858; he briefly preached at several churches in Woodford County in the following months.

Breckinridge was elected moderator of the Presbyterian Church (Old School) General Assembly in 1859, when it was held in Indianapolis. There, he oversaw the selection of a new site for what would become the Presbyterian Theological Seminary of the Northwest, at the time located in New Albany, Indiana; Indianapolis and Chicago were the candidate cities and the latter was ultimately selected due in part to a $100,000 (equivalent to $3.6 million in 2025) donation from Cyrus McCormick and allowance for the use of 45 acres of land from a separate group. Breckinridge was nominated as a candidate for a teaching position at the new seminary but lost that election to N. L. Rice; he was subsequently elected to a teaching job at the Danville Theological Seminary in Danville, Kentucky, though he declined.

=== College president ===
In 1860, Breckinridge returned to academia when he accepted a position as president of Oakland College near Rodney, Mississippi, succeeding James Purviance. His presidency at Oakland was short-lived, as the breakout of the Civil War prompted the college's temporary closure. After the war, the school reopened with Joseph Calvin at the helm, though he died shortly thereafter and Oakland was unable to return to its pre-war state; it closed in 1871 and was sold to the state of Mississippi.

Breckinridge began his term as president of Centre College on October 15, 1863. He delivered his inaugural address, entitled A Christian College: Its Instruction and Its Government, on October 14, 1864. Inheriting the presidency during the Civil War and with family members on either side of the conflict, he aligned himself with centrist views and attempted to welcome students from both sides to the school. The war had noticeable effects on the college and its enrollment: 92 students attended Centre during the academic year following the war's conclusion and that number had dropped to 43 students some two years later. The graduating classes while he was in office ranged from seven to thirteen students. Additionally, the cost of tuition increased for the first time since 1830 when it was changed from $33 (equivalent to $679 in 2025) to $50 (equivalent to $1,029 in 2025) per year. Centre remained open throughout the duration of the war but suffered nonetheless, as did the town; Confederate guerilla outlaws William Quantrill and Frank James led a stint of violence in Danville in January 1865 that included the destruction of the city bookstore and telegraph office, as well as the robbery of numerous citizens at gunpoint.

Breckinridge resigned as president of Centre College on October 16, 1868. The resignation took effect the following month and he returned to his farm in Missouri to resume preaching.

== Personal life and death ==
Breckinridge married Frances C. Prevost, granddaughter of Samuel Stanhope Smith, on May 10, 1824. After she died, he remarried to Sarah Ann Garnett, a widow, in 1873. He had twelve children, eight of whom survived to adulthood. He died in Cass County, Missouri, on December 26, 1876. He was buried at Cave Hill Cemetery in Louisville, Kentucky.

== Publications ==
The titles of several publications have been abridged for practical purposes.

=== Speeches ===
- A Christian College: Its Instruction and Its Government (PDF). Cincinnati, Ohio: Moore, Wilstach & Baldwin, Printers. 1864.
- "Breckinridge's defense, in vindication of his principles and conduct against the aspersions of the Rev. Mr. Taylor" (PDF). The Baltimore Literary and Religious Magazine. Vol. 7, no. 10. Baltimore, Maryland: R. J. Matchett. October 1841. pp. 447–457.
- "Case of Rev. Dr. S. B. McPheeters" (PDF). The Central Presbyterian. Vol. 9, no. 35. Richmond, Virginia: Rev. William Brown, D. D. September 1864.

=== Sermons ===
- "A Discourse on Usury" (PDF). Spirit of the XIX Century. Vol. 2, no. 2. Baltimore, Maryland: R. J. Matchett. February 1843. pp. 89–111.
- "Sermon on Isaiah 40:1" (PDF). The Baltimore Literary and Religious Magazine. Vol. 2, no. 4. Baltimore, Maryland: R. J. Matchett. April 1836. pp. 121–129.
- Submission to the Will of God: A Fast Day Sermon (PDF). Louisville, Kentucky: Morton & Griswold. 1841.
