= First Presbyterian Church (Danville, Kentucky) =

Historic church in Kentucky, United States

- U.S. National Register of Historic Places
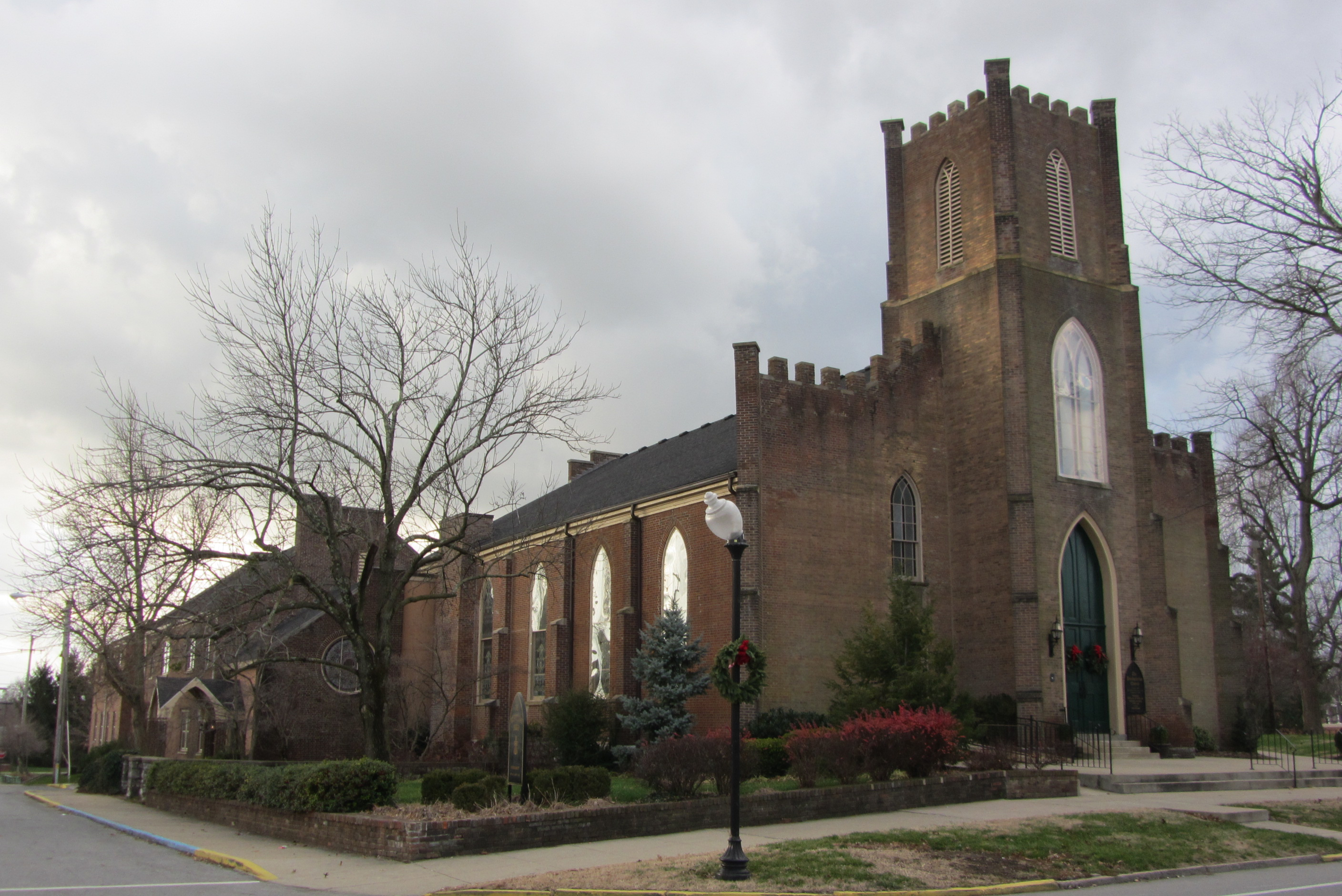

- Location within Kentucky Location within the United States
- Location: 500 W. Main, Danville, Kentucky
- Coordinates: 37°38′45″N 84°46′39″W
- Area: 3.4 acres (1.4 ha)
- Built: 1832
- Built by: Robert Russel, Sr.
- Architect: Robert Russel, Jr.
- Architectural style: Gothic Revival
- MPS: Danville MRA
- NRHP reference No.: 86000638
- Added to NRHP: March 31, 1986

The First Presbyterian Church in Danville, Kentucky is a historic church on West Main Street in Danville, in Boyle County. It was built in 1832. It was added to the National Register of Historic Places in 1986.

McDowell Park, which includes a former cemetery of the church, is part of the historic site.

== See also ==
- National Register of Historic Places listings in Kentucky
