= List of Centre College people =

Here follows a list of notable people associated with Centre College in Danville, Kentucky.

== Notable graduates ==
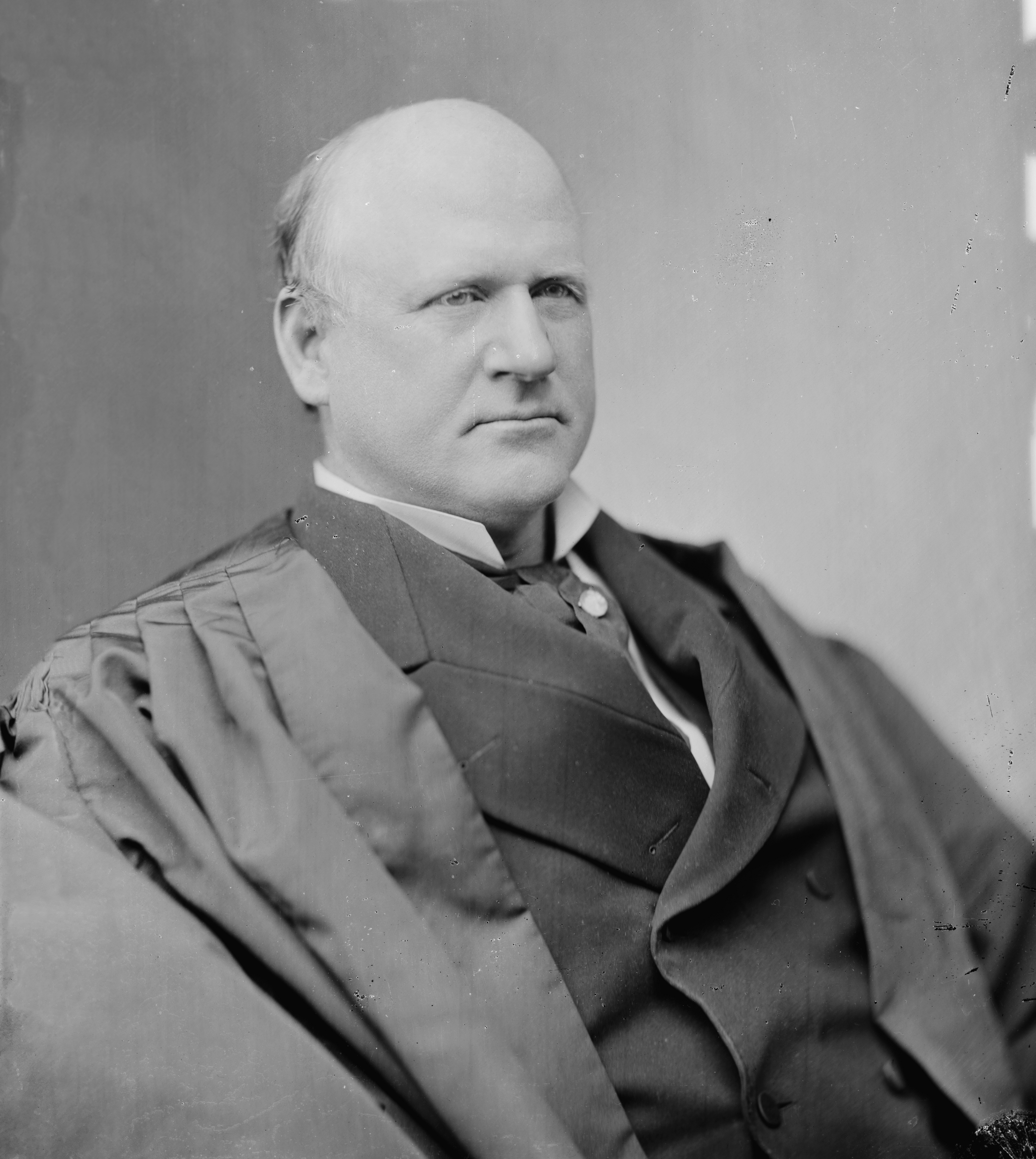
Justice John Marshall Harlan, class of 1850

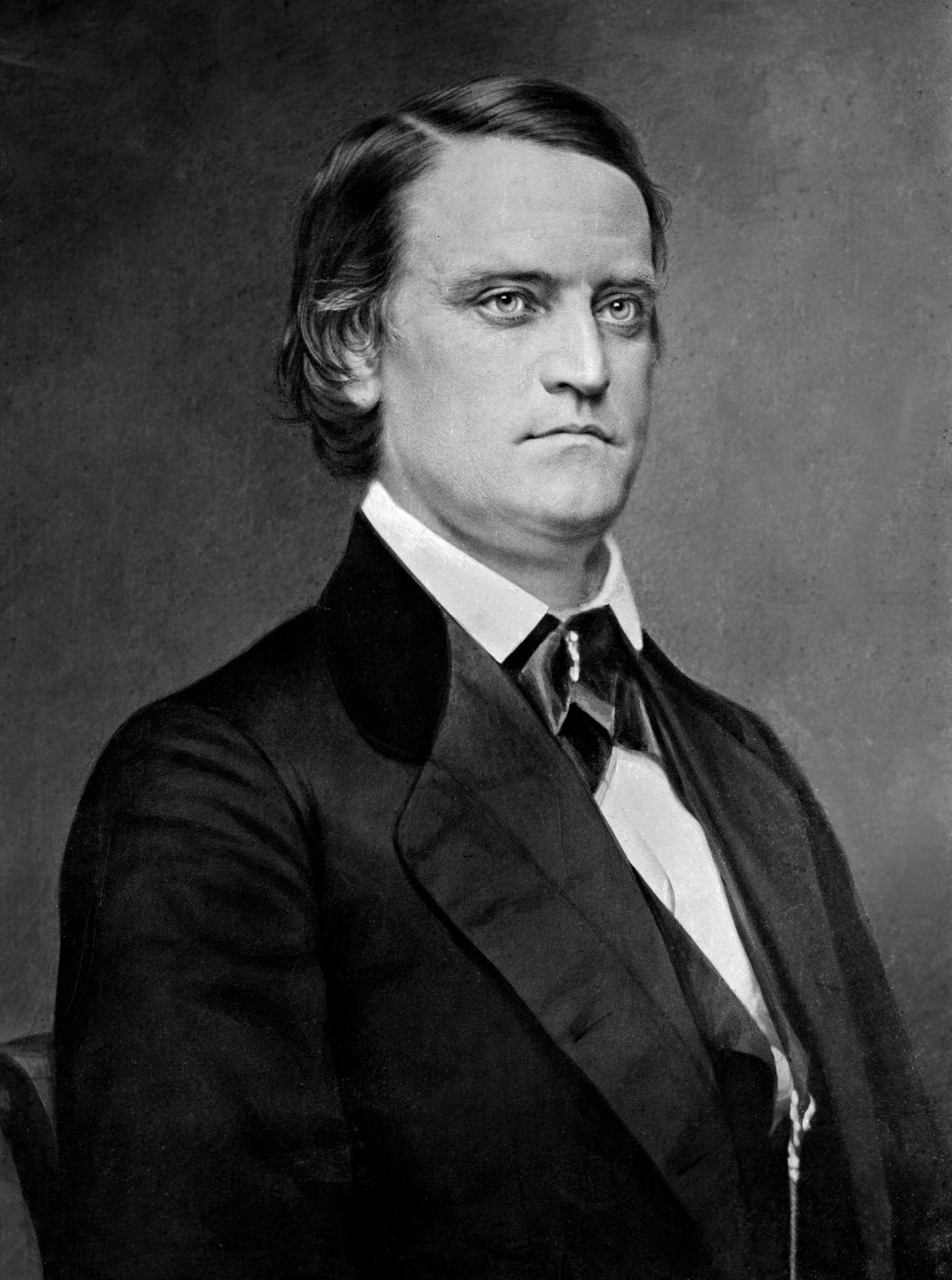
Vice President John C. Breckinridge, class of 1838

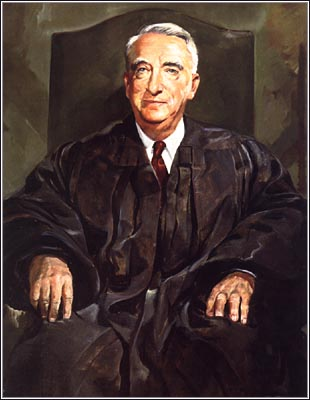
Chief Justice Fred M. Vinson, class of 1909, law class of 1911

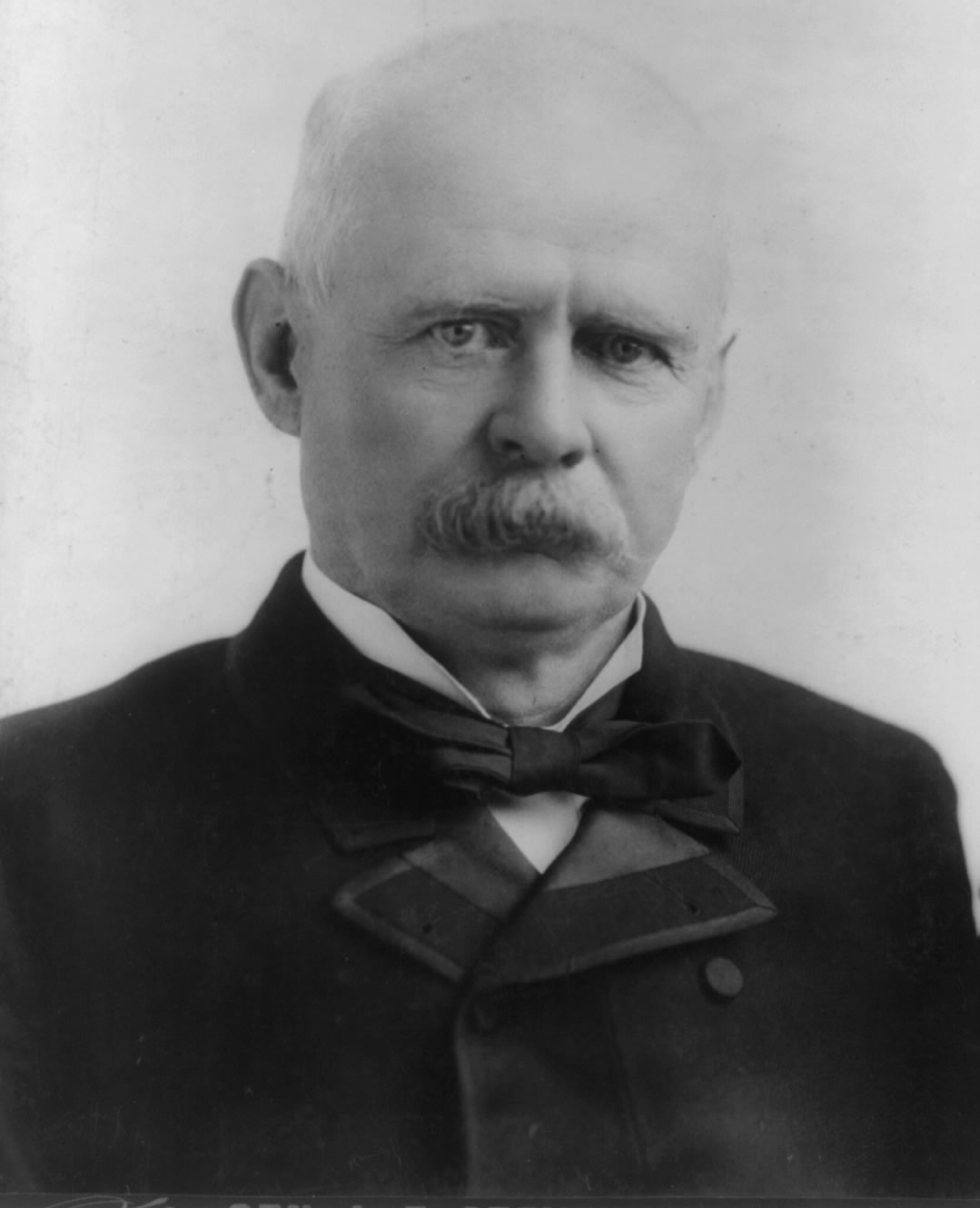
Vice President Adlai E. Stevenson, class of 1859

=== Law ===
- John Christian Bullitt, 1849: attorney in Philadelphia, drafted the city's charter and founded the law firm of Drinker, Biddle & Reath
- John Marshall Harlan, 1850: Supreme Court associate justice (1877–1911), cast the lone dissenting vote in Plessy v. Ferguson
- Pierce Lively, 1943: federal judge on the United States Court of Appeals for the Sixth Circuit (1972–2016)
- Andrew Phelps McCormick, 1854: federal judge on the United States Court of Appeals for the Fifth Circuit (1892–1916)
- Fred M. Vinson, 1909, Law 1911: chief justice of the United States (1946–53), secretary of the treasury (1945–46), member of the U.S. House of Representatives from KY–08 and KY–09 (1933–43)

=== Government ===
- George Madison Adams: member of the U.S. House of Representatives from KY–08 and KY–09 (1867–75), secretary of state of Kentucky (1887–91)
- Joshua Fry Bell, 1828: member of the U.S. House of Representatives from KY–04 (1845–47; first Centre alumnus to serve in Congress), secretary of state of Kentucky (1849–50)
- John C. Breckinridge, 1838: U.S. vice president (1857–61); Confederate secretary of war (1865); U.S. senator from Kentucky (1861)
- John Y. Brown, Sr., 1921: member of the U.S. House of Representatives from KY–AL (1933–35)
- Jacqueline Coleman, 2004: lieutenant governor of Kentucky (2019–present)
- John Sherman Cooper, 1922: U.S. ambassador to East Germany (1974–76), U.S. senator from Kentucky (1946–49, 1952–55, 1956–73), U.S. ambassador to India (1955–56)
- Emma Curtis: Lexington-Fayette Urban County Council member (2025–present); first openly transgender city official in Kentucky
- Ed Gallrein, farmer, former Navy SEAL officer, Republican Party nominee in the U.S. House of Representatives election for Kentucky's fourth congressional district in 2026.
- Joseph Holt, 1824: U.S. postmaster general, U.S. secretary of war and Judge Advocate General of the United States Army; leading judge in the trials of the Abraham Lincoln assassination
- Michael W. Jackson, 1985: Alabama district attorney (2005–present)
- Crit Luallen, 1974: lieutenant governor of Kentucky (2014–2015), Kentucky state auditor (2004–2012)
- Claude Matthews, 1867: governor of Indiana (1893–97), secretary of state of Indiana (1891–93)
- Austin Peay, 1895: governor of Tennessee (1923–27)
- Augustus Stanley, 1889: U.S. senator from Kentucky (1919–25), governor of Kentucky (1915–19), member of the U.S. House of Representatives from KY–02 (1903–15)
- Adlai Stevenson I, 1859: U.S. vice president (1893–97), member of the U.S. House of Representatives from IL–13 (1875–77, 1879–81)
- John T. Stuart, 1826: member of the U.S. House of Representatives from IL–03 (1839–43) and IL–08 (1863–65), lawyer, law partner of Abraham Lincoln
- Thomas H. Taylor: Confederate general (1861–65), Louisville chief of police (1881–92)
- George Graham Vest: U.S. senator from Missouri (1879–1903), Confederate senator from Missouri (1865), member of the Confederate House of Representatives from MO–05; best known for supposedly coining the phrases "man's best friend" and "history is written by the victors"
- Yi Kuu, Prince Imperial Hoeun, 1952: prince imperial of Korea, grandson of Emperor Gojong

=== Arts ===
- Tony Crunk, 1978: winner, Yale Younger Poets prize
- George Ella Lyon, 1971: former Kentucky Poet Laureate
- Stephen Rolfe Powell, 1974: internationally acclaimed glass blower and art professor
- Tiffany Reisz, 2000: RITA award-winning novelist

=== Athletics ===
- Gene Bedford: second baseman for the Cleveland Indians and defensive end for the Rochester Jeffersons
- Herb Covington, 1924: played football, basketball, and baseball for Centre, named to the all-time Centre football team in 1935
- E.A. Diddle, 1920: legendary basketball coach of Western Kentucky University, member of the Naismith Memorial Basketball Hall of Fame
- Jordan Gay, 2013: punter and kickoff specialist for the Buffalo Bills
- Cawood Ledford, 1949: voice of the University of Kentucky Wildcats for 30 years
- Alvin Nugent "Bo" McMillin, 1922: three-time All-American quarterback; member of the College Football Hall of Fame; head football coach of Indiana University, Detroit Lions, and Philadelphia Eagles
- Sully Montgomery, 1920: tackle for the Chicago Cardinals; boxer
- Tom Moran: blocking back for the New York Giants
- Homer Rice: football coach
- Red Roberts, 1922: NFL player; head football coach of Waynesburg University
- Lou Smyth, 1919: three-time NFL champion with the Canton Bulldogs
- John Tanner, 1921: NFL wingback with the Toledo Maroons, Cleveland Indians, and Cleveland Bulldogs
- Ken Willis, 1986 (transferred after one year): kicker for the Dallas Cowboys

=== Academia ===
- Raymond Burse, 1973: Rhodes Scholar; general counsel for General Electric; former president of Kentucky State University; first African-American to compete in the Oxford v. Cambridge rugby match

=== Business ===
- Isaac Tigrett, 1970: founder of the Hard Rock Cafe and the House of Blues

=== Other ===
- Rev. Samuel D. Burchard, 1837: clergyman whose "Rum, Romanism and rebellion" speech may have cost James G. Blaine the 1884 presidential election
- Charles Carpenter (Lt. Col.): highly decorated Second World War artillery observation pilot nicknamed "Bazooka Charlie"; destroyed several German armored vehicles in his bazooka-equipped L-4 Grasshopper light observation aircraft, christened "Rosie the Rocketer"
- George W. Harkins: attorney and chief of the Choctaw tribe during Indian removal
- Lewis Craig Humphrey, 1896: editor of the Centre College newspaper The Cento; chief editor of the Louisville Evening Post and Louisville Herald

== Faculty and staff ==
- J. Proctor Knott: law professor at Centre; 29th governor of Kentucky
- Sara Mahan: 64th secretary of state of Kentucky, served as college librarian 1920–21
- Ephraim McDowell: member of the board of trustees, namesake of the Ephraim McDowell Regional Medical Center

== Presidents of the college ==
Presidents
No.	Name	Term in office	Notes	Ref.
1	Rev. James McChord	1820 (Note: Died in office)	Founder of Second Presbyterian Church (Lexington, Kentucky); died before officially assuming the presidency, but still considered the first president	
2	Rev. Jeremiah Chamberlain	1823 – 1826	President of the College of Louisiana (1826–1828); founding president of Oakland College (1830–1851)	
3	Rev. Gideon Blackburn	1827 – 1830		
4	Rev. John C. Young	1830 – 1857	Pastor of Danville Presbyterian Church (1834–1852); moderator of the PCUSA General Assembly (1853); Centre's longest-serving president	
5	Rev. Lewis W. Green	1858 – 1863	Centre alumnus (1824); president of Hampden–Sydney College (1848–1856); president of Transylvania University (1856–1857)	
6	Rev. William L. Breckinridge	1863 – 1868	Moderator of the PCUSA General Assembly (1859); president of Oakland College (1860–1861)	
7	Ormond Beatty	1870 – 1888	Centre alumnus (1835); the first Centre president who was not a minister	
8	Rev. William C. Young	1888 – 1896	Centre alumnus (1859); moderator of the PCUSA General Assembly (1892); son of fourth president John C. Young	
9	Rev. William C. Roberts	1898 – 1903	President of Lake Forest University (1886–1892); moderator of the PCUSA General Assembly (1889)	
10	Rev. Frederick W. Hinitt	1904 – 1915	President of Parsons College (1900–1904); president of Washington & Jefferson University (1915–1918)	
11	Rev. William Arthur Ganfield	1915 – 1921	President of Carroll College (1921–1939)	
12	Rev. R. Ames Montgomery	1922 – 1926	President of Parsons College (1917–1922)	
13	Charles J. Turck	1927 – 1936	President of Macalester College (1939–1958)	
14	Rev. Robert L. McLeod	1938 – 1945 (Note: Robert L. McLeod and Robert J. McMullen served as co-presidents from September 1944 to November 1945 while McLeod was on a leave of absence serving as a chaplain in the United States Navy.)		
15	Rev. Robert J. McMullen	1944 – 1946	Centre alumnus (1905); president of Hangchow Christian College (1938–1942)	
16	Rev. Walter A. Groves	1947 – 1957	President of Abadan Institute of Technology (1957–1961)	
17	Thomas A. Spragens	1957 – 1981	President of Stephens College (1952–1957)	
18	Richard L. Morrill	1982 – 1988	President of Salem College (1979–1982); president of the University of Richmond (1988–1998)	
19	Michael F. Adams	1989 – 1997	President of the University of Georgia (1997–2013)	
20	John A. Roush	1998 – 2020		
21	Milton C. Moreland	2020 – present		
