= Rev. Mr. Gurley =

Rev. Mr. Gurley may refer to:

- Ralph Randolph Gurley (1797–1872), American Presbyterian minister
- Phineas Densmore Gurley (1816–1868), American Presbyterian minister
