= McChord =

McChord may refer to:

== People ==
- Austin McChord (born 1985), American engineer and businessman
- James McChord (1785–1820), American Presbyterian minister
- William McChord Hurt (1950–2022), American actor

== Other uses ==
- Joint Base Lewis–McChord, American military force base in Tacoma, Washington
- McChord Field, American military base in Pierce County, Washington
- McChord Air Museum, air museum in Lakewood, Washington
