= Henry H. Gird =

Professor and second president of the College of Louisiana

Henry Hatton Gird III
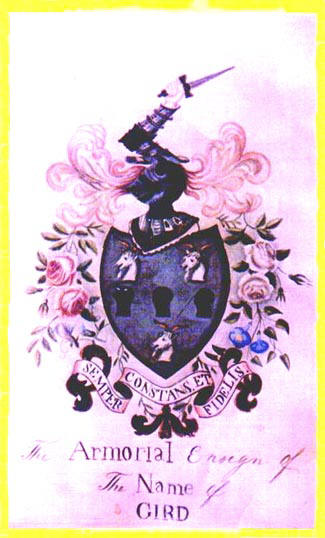
- The Gird Family Coat of Arms

2nd President of the College of Louisiana

Personal details
- Born: May 29, 1801; New York City
- Died: June 1, 1845 (aged 44); New Orleans
- Spouse: Sarah Ann Kinsley
- Children: Anna Maria Gird Henry Harrison Gird Louis Kinsley Gird Richard Kinsley Gird Edward Kinsley Gird Eliza Kinsley Gird Capt. Joseph Wheeler Gird William Otis Gird Samuel Woodward Gird
- Education: West Point Military Academy

Henry Hatton Gird III was born 29 May 1801, in New York City. He graduated from West Point Academy at the age of 22 as a Second Lieutenant. After his career in the Army, he became a professor of Mathematics at the College of Louisiana, and was also the second President of the college, from 1829 to 1833.

Gird organized a military program while at the college. He was instrumental in the design and construction of the university's first central building and the two new wings that increased the size of the facility. He was responsible for building the college hospital and the Library, and the College Chapel, as well as the College President's house and the living quarters for the professors.

After his resignation from the college, Gird accepted a position at the New Orleans Mint. He died of yellow fever at age 44.

Academic offices
Preceded by Jeremiah Chamberlain	President of the College of Louisiana; 1829–1834	Succeeded by James Shannon
