= Lars Eighner =

American author and memoirst (1948–2021)

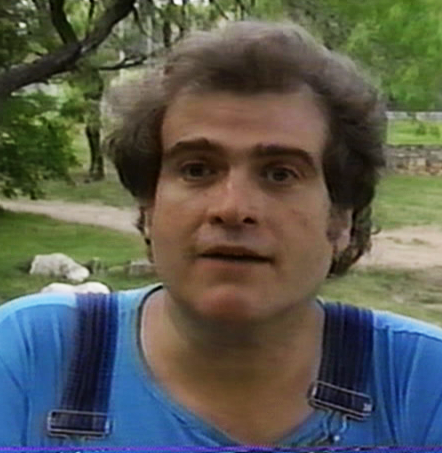
- Lars Eighner in "Declarations: Essays on American Ideals"
- Born: Laurence Vail Eighner; November 25, 1948; Corpus Christi, Texas
- Died: December 23, 2021 (aged 73); Austin, Texas
- Occupation: Writer
- Writing career
- Genres: Memoir, erotica
- Notable work: Travels with Lizbeth

Laurence "Lars" Eighner Hexamer (born Laurence Vail Eighner, November 25, 1948 – December 23, 2021) was an American author and memoirist. He was the author of Travels with Lizbeth, a memoir of homelessness in the American Southwest during the late 1980s, "a book widely regarded as one of the finest memoirs of recent decades." Included as a chapter in that book was the essay "On Dumpster Diving," which is widely anthologized both at full length and in abridged form under the title "My Daily Dives in the Dumpster."

Eighner also wrote Pawn to Queen Four, a novel; Lavender Blue: How to Write and Sell Gay Men's Erotica, also published as Elements of Arousal (an early edition includes an introduction by noted erotica author John Preston); Gay Cosmos, a work of gay theory; and numerous short works of gay men's erotica, collected under various titles.

== Early life and education ==
Lars Eighner was born in Corpus Christi, Texas, into a family with various writing experiences. His mother was Alice Elizabeth Vail Eighner (later Harlow) and his father Lawrence Clifton Eighner. He was grandson of the Texas poets Alice Ewing Vail (The Big Thicket) and John Arthur Vail (John Vail Ballads). His birth name is Laurence Vail Eighner and he grew up in Houston, Texas, and graduated from Lamar High School in 1966. He briefly attended Chamberlain-Hunt Academy in Mississippi in 1964. According to People magazine, Eighner attended school at the University of Texas at Austin, majoring in ethical studies before he dropped out to become a counselor at an Austin drug crisis center. He also studied creative writing under George Williams of Rice University at the Corpus Christi Fine Arts Colony. As reported in The New York Times, in 1993, Eighner believed his dropping out of college was due to the combination of family disagreements over his sexual orientation and migraine headaches. Shortly after dropping out, his path to homelessness began. As reported in The New York Times, Eighner describes his falling out of his job at the Austin State Hospital as a result of an argument with a supervisor, leading him to quit.

== Career ==
Eighner began writing for publication in the early 1980s. By that time he was generally known as Lars, the result of having worked in a small office with two Larrys. Because in early writing attempts he had been confused with Black Mountain poet Larry Eigner, Eighner used "Lars" for writing. His first book was a collection of short stories, Bayou Boy and Other Stories (Gay Sunshine Press, 1985). In the late 1980s, he and his dog Lizbeth became homeless, and his experiences as a homeless person in Austin, Texas; Los Angeles, and places in between are the subject of Travels with Lizbeth. Eighner had published the comic novel “Pawn to Queen Four” in the 1980s. Eighner became homeless a second time in 1988 after leaving a job he had held for ten years as an attendant at a state hospital in Austin, Texas. Although he was homeless, he was featured in many magazines and became integrated into the writing community. Eighner's work has emerged in various magazines such as Harper's in 1991 and The New York Times in 1998. In 1994, he lectured in both Hawaii and San Francisco and even made an appearance at the Oscars as a representative for Esquire magazine. In 1994, Travels With Lizbeth was nominated for a Lambda Literary Award for Gay Men's Biography/Autobiography. In 1994, Lars was still being noticed for his work and was elected to the Texas Institute of Letters. Although his publications were popular, they never seemed to keep him out of poverty, he had published “Gay Cosmos” in 1995 and his literary output still dried up.

== Personal life ==
On July 5, 2015, Eighner was married to the man called Clint in his memoir, with whom he had lived for nearly 28 years. In 2017, he assumed his husband's surname and his legal name became Laurence Eighner Hexamer. Eighner suffered from many medical issues throughout his life. Eighner encountered many health problems along with his weight issues, he suffered from phlebitis, migraines, and arthritis. Eighner, himself, said in a New York Times interview that his weight problems were because “It costs money to lose weight” Eighner stated in an interview with The New York Times that at one point in his life, he was “360 pounds on his 6-foot-3-inch frame.”

He died aged 73 on December 23, 2021, in Austin.

== Notable work ==
The memoir Travels With Lizbeth reflects on the three years that Eighner spent on the streets; starting in the late 1980s, he traveled by any transportation means possible and found meals in different places, including other people's garbage. According to Genzlinger in The New York Times, “His 1993 Memoir ‘Travels With Lizbeth’, is considered a classic of the genre and brought him fame but not fortune.” The New York Times has also described this book as “a modern autobiography of a supertramp.” This book was featured in many different magazines, like the New York Times and Harper’s, as notable, “In 2019, a panel of book critics of The Times named “Travels With Lizbeth” one of the 50 best memoirs in the last 50 years”

The frequently reprinted essay “On Dumpster Diving” was based on the dumpster diving that he started about a year before he had become completely homeless. He describes the act of dumpster diving and the thoughts he encountered about the act. He includes a section describing the three principles that go into eating safely out of a dumpster in this piece. The origin of his piece, “On Dumpster Diving”, began shortly after he became homeless in 1988 when he left a job he held for ten years. One of his biggest supporters in the success of both "On Dumpster diving" and Travels With Lizbeth was his friend, fellow author, and agent Steven Saylor.
