= Stephen P. Hill =

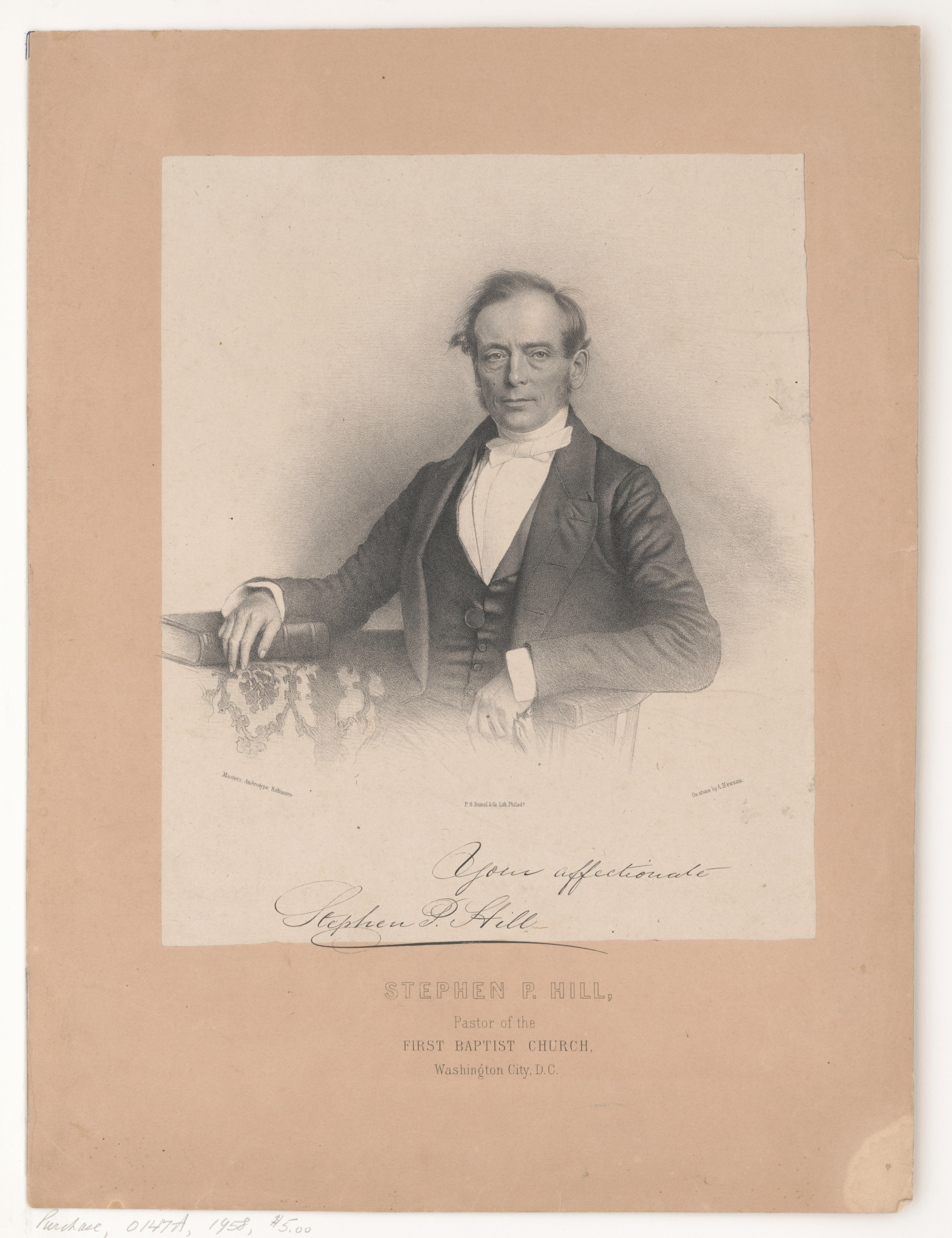
Stephen P. Hill

Stephen P. Hill (1806–1884) was a Baptist clergyman who served as Chaplain of the Senate.

== Early life ==
Stephen Prescott Hill was born in Salem, Massachusetts, on April 17, 1806. He was educated at Waterville College, Brown University (Class of 1829) and Newton Theological Seminary (1832). He was ordained on April 2, 1832.

== Ministry ==
On October 2, 1832, Hill was called to be pastor of the First Baptist Church in Haverhill, Massachusetts. While serving there the church completed its second meeting house which was dedicated on November 7, 1833. Hill was advised to move to a milder climate due to ill health, and so he left the church in May 1834. For a year thereafter, he supplied the pulpit of the Georgetown, D.C. church. Then, he was called to be the pastor of First Baptist Church, Baltimore, Maryland; he would serve there seventeen years. Other Baltimore Baptist congregations formed out of the growing membership of the church during his pastorate, including Seventh Baptist Church.

Hill then was called to be the pastor of First Baptist in Washington, D.C., where he served from 1850 to 1861. While serving in Washington, Hill was elected to serve as Chaplain of the Senate on December 8, 1856.

Hill was also a prolific hymn writer, compiling a book published in 1836 called "Christian Hymns" with 655 hymns. Many appeared in Baptist hymnals anonymously during Hill's lifetime. They seem not to have lasted in popularity; none are in current hymnbooks. Hill died in Washington, DC on September 15, 1884.

== Personal life ==
Stephen Prescott Hill married Martha Ellen Corcoran . Her brother William Wilson Corcoran was the founder of the Corcoran Gallery of Art. Their children were: William Corcoran Hill and Mary Wilson Hill Reynolds.

Religious titles
Preceded by Henry Clay Dean	39th US Senate Chaplain; December 8, 1856 – December 15, 1859	Succeeded by Phineas Densmore Gurley
