= Robert L. Stanton =

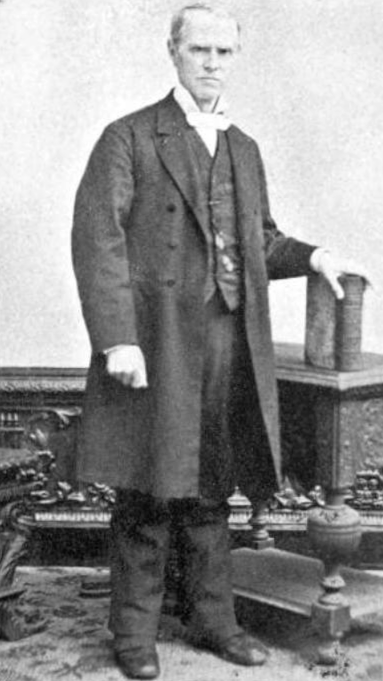

President of Miami University
- In office 1866–1871
- Preceded by: John W. Hall
- Succeeded by: Andrew Dousa Hepburn

Moderator of the 78th General Assembly of the Presbyterian Church in the U.S.
- In office 1866–1867
- Preceded by: John Cameron Lowrie
- Succeeded by: Phineas Densmore Gurley

2nd President of Oakland College
- In office November 1851 – 1854
- Preceded by: Jeremiah Chamberlain
- Succeeded by: James Purviance

Personal details
- Born: Robert Lodowick Stanton; March 28, 1810 Preston, Connecticut, U.S.
- Died: May 23, 1885 (aged 75) Aboard Nevada
- Relatives: Henry B. Stanton (brother); Elizabeth C. Stanton (sister-in-law)
- Education: Lane Seminary; Princeton University
- Occupation: Theologian, educator

Robert Lodowick Stanton (Note: According to his obituary in The Indianapolis News, his full name was Robert Livingston Stanton.) D.D. (March 28, 1810 – May 23, 1885) was an American Presbyterian minister, educator and college administrator. He served as president of Miami University of Ohio from 1868 to 1871. He also served as president of Oakland College in Mississippi.

== Early life ==
Robert Lodowick Stanton was born on March 28, 1810, in Preston, Connecticut, the son of Joseph Stanton (1780–1828) and Susan M. (née Brewster) Stanton (1781–1853). His father manufactured woolen goods and traded with the West Indies. Robert's older brother was Henry Brewster Stanton, who became a journalist and abolitionist, publishing widely in New York and abolitionist newspapers, and lecturing on the abolitionist circuit. Henry married Elizabeth Cady, who became a leader on issues of temperance, women's rights and suffrage, as well as abolition.

Robert Stanton studied at the Oneida Institute in Whitesboro, New York, which he left with the so-called Lane Rebels for the Lane Theological Seminary in Cincinnati, Ohio, from which he graduated. He earned his D.D. degree from Princeton University.

== Career ==
He was ordained in 1839 by the Mississippi Presbytery, and became the pastor of churches in Mississippi, Louisiana, and Ohio. He served as the second president of Oakland College, near Rodney, Mississippi, from 1851 to 1854; it was affiliated with the Presbyterian Church.

He was Professor of Theology at Danville Theological Seminary in Kentucky from 1862 to 1866. From 1866 until 1871, he served as president of Miami University of Ohio. He was moderator of the general assembly of the Presbyterian Church from 1866 to 1867.

== Death ==
Stanton, who was a widower with one son, died aboard the steamship Nevada en route to London and was buried at sea on May 28, 1885, at the age of seventy-five. At the time of his death, his residence was 2727 N Street Northwest, Washington, D.C.

=== Legacy ===
Stanton Hall on the Miami University campus is named in his honor.

Academic offices
Preceded by John W. Hall	President of Miami University; 1866-1871	Succeeded by Andrew Dousa Hepburn
Preceded by Jeremiah Chamberlain	President of Oakland College; 1851–1854	Succeeded by James Purviance
Religious titles
Preceded by The Rev. John Cameron Lowrie	Moderator of the 78th General Assembly of the U.S. Presbyterian Church; 1866–1867	Succeeded by The Rev. Phineas Densmore Gurley
