= Henry Hughes (sociologist) =

American politician (1829–1862)

- Born: April 17, 1829; Port Gibson, Mississippi, U.S.
- Died: October 3, 1862 (aged 33); Port Gibson, Mississippi, U.S.
- Education: Oakland College
- Occupations: Lawyer, politician
- Title: Colonel

Henry Hughes (1829–1862) was an American lawyer, state senator, and Confederate Colonel from Mississippi. He developed the economic notion of warrantism and supported the re-establishment of the African slave trade.

== Life and career ==
=== Early life ===
Hughes was born on April 17, 1829, in Port Gibson, Mississippi. His father was Captain Benjamin Hughes (1789–1842) and his mother, Nancy Brashear (1797–1875). His parents were originally from Kentucky.

Hughes graduated from Oakland College in 1847. He studied law in Port Gibson with John B. Thrasher and in New Orleans, Louisiana, with Thomas Jefferson Durant. He continued his studies in Paris, France, where he took classes in architecture, social science, anatomy, chemistry, and moral philosophy. Hughes also became a follower of the sociologist Auguste Comte. He was also influenced by Francis Bacon, Thomas Carlyle, Charles Fourier, John Locke, Jeremy Bentham, and John Stuart Mill.

=== Career ===
Returning to Port Gibson, Mississippi, Hughes started practising law.

Although he was not a sociologist, Hughes was one of the first Americans to use the term "sociology" in a book title with his Treatise on Sociology, Theoretical and Practical, the other being George Fitzhugh's Sociology for the South. He argued that the economic system of the South was superior to that of the North.

Hughes developed the economic notion of 'warrantism,' with the owner being the "warrantor" and the worker being the "warrantee".

As summarized by Emily Van Dorn Miller, sister of assassinated Confederate General Earl Van Dorn, in 1902, "Henry Hughes...calls the slaves 'Warrantees'—being warranted shelter, food and clothing, — and the planters 'warrantors'; and he considered Southern slaves greatly improved in condition when they were brought from barbarous Africa and 'elevated into slavery.'" The notion implied a strong, central government, whereby all were required to work, whether they were warrantors or warrantees. The state would take precedence over individuals, and duty over personal freedom. Hughes argued that the ownership of other human beings was absurd, saying "Men cannot be owned." Both masters and slaves were "servants of the social order", as critic Jeffrey P. Sklansky explains. Furthermore, he argued that warrantees could be threatened with punishment to make sure they would work; warrantors would be self-motivated to work to maintain their position. He rejected Edmund Burke's ideas about laissez faire capitalism.

Hughes was elected a Fellow of the New Orleans Academy of Arts and Sciences in 1853. He then served in the Mississippi State Senate in 1857. During his term, he supported the re-establishment of the African slave trade with the South.

Hughes published articles in Mississippi newspapers about the slave trade in his 1857–1858 series entitled 'Reopening the Slave Trade: A Series by St Henry.'. He also published articles about giving more status to African slaves, as "dutiful slaves". Additionally, Hughes suggested repatriating blacks slaves and replacing them with imported new African warrantees, who would learn the duty of work from their birth to serve the state as opposed to slavery.

According to literary critic Michael Wainwright, Hughes believed in the mythology of the Southern aristocracy as descendants of Anglo-Saxons with "Germanic heredity" and "North and Celtic inheritance". He believed segregation between blacks and whites was mandatory to preserve this heritage, arguing that social interaction would inevitably lead to sexual intercourse. Moreover, he wrote that Native Americans would have to be exterminated due to their "wild" ways. Hughes' worldview has been described as fascist in its rejection of liberal values and modernization of slavery.

During the American Civil War of 1861–1865, Hughes served as Colonel in the Mississippi Twelfth Regiment and the Army of Northern Virginia of the Confederate States Army.

=== Death ===
Hughes died of rheumatism on October 3, 1862, at his home in Port Gibson, Mississippi.

== Legacy ==
Hughes' ideas influenced counter-Reconstruction efforts in the South after the Civil War. His Treatise on Sociology was used as a textbook in the American South until the 1890s.

According to scholars Stanford M. Lyman and Arthur J. Vidich, his ideas were also echoed by Joseph Le Conte in California, shortly after the Treaty of Guadalupe Hidalgo. Le Conte used Hughes's ideas to implement the management of former Mexican-owned farms called "latifundias", now the largest farms in California. In keeping with Hughes's ideas, Californian farm owners hired non-Anglo Saxon workers to work on their farms, such as Chinese, Japanese, East Indian, Filipino and Mexican immigrants, in order to find the most productive and most docile workers. This echoed Hughes's notion of the dutiful slave, or warrantee.

Later, Hughes's ideas influenced President Franklin D. Roosevelt's Keynesian public policy, by demanding that the state ensured all citizens would be working. Hughes's ideas have also been compared to those of Lawrence Mead in terms of requiring the poor to work.

== Works ==
- Treatise on Sociology, Theoretical and Practical (Philadelphia: Lippincott, Gramco and Co., 1854).
- State Liberties: Or, the Right to African Contract Labor. (Port Gibson: Office of the Southern Reveille, 1858), reprinted in De Bow's Review, n.s., 1 (o.s. XXV), No. VI (December, 1858).
- Selected Writings of Henry Hughes: Antebellum Southerner, Slavocrat, Sociologist, edited by Stanford M. Lyman (Jackson, Mississippi, 1985).
