= Henry Clay Dean =

American lawyer and preacher (1822–1887)

Henry Clay Dean (27 October 1822 – 6 February 1887) was a Methodist Episcopal preacher, lawyer, orator and author who was a critic of the American Civil War and the Lincoln Administration.

== Early life and education ==
Dean was born in Fayette County, Pennsylvania, October 27, 1822. Named for the senator from Kentucky, Henry Clay, Dean was born just two years after Clay guided the Missouri Compromise into law. He was one of three sons of Caleb Dean, a stonemason. He was a graduate of Madison College in Pennsylvania and taught for a time in the area and studied law.

Dean married Christiana Margaret Haigler on Jan. 19, 1847 and together they had six children: John Willey Dean, Charles Caleb Dean, Henry Clay Dean Jr., Mary Jermima Dean, George James Dean, Christiana Margaret Dean and Virginia Rebecca "Vinnie" Dean.

== Career ==
In 1845 he joined the Methodist Episcopal Conference of Virginia and began to preach in the mountain region of that state where he remained for four years. In 1850 he removed to Iowa, locating to Pittsburg in Van Buren County, where he preached through the Keosauqua circuit, joining the Fairfield Conference. Through the influence of George Wallace Jones, one of Iowa's early United States Senators, Dean was chosen chaplain of the United States Senate on December 4, 1855.

Dean was one of the trustees of the Iowa Wesleyan College at Mount Pleasant, Iowa. Dean was admitted to the bar but did not practice law until after the Civil War. He was a public speaker of rare eloquence and was frequently invited to deliver lectures, among which was a ‘Reply to Ingersoll,' ‘The Constitution,' ‘Declaration of Independence' and many other topics.

== United States Civil War ==
Dean carried his Methodist values into the period leading up to the Civil War. He opposed the extension of slavery. He opposed the Lecompton Constitution written by proslavery Kansans and supported the popular sovereignty view of Stephen Douglas. He did not support the continuation of slavery in the nation, but he believed that slaves should be freed through government purchase over time. In his article "The Bloodmarket of the Rich", Dean argued the entire war was conceived by an international conspiracy of bankers and "stock-gamblers".

Dean was arrested for disloyal utterances and confined in prison for two weeks by order of Government officials. Upon his release he wrote and published a book with the title, ‘Crimes of the Civil War.' It was a bitter rebuttal against President Lincoln and the administration in the work of subduing the Rebellion.

== Later life ==
With the conclusion of the war, Dean became a spokesman for Democrats in opposition to Radical Republicanism. In 1867 he began to advocate "soft money" inflation and payment of the national debt through the continued printing of paper money. In doing so, he became a founder of the United States Greenback Party among western Democrats. Dean vociferously promoted Greenbackism, decried the National Bank system, and denounced bondholders. He also again offered stinging criticism of Lincoln's wartime actions. He brought his views together in Crimes of the Civil War and Curse of the Funding System (1869). Dean also practiced law after the war and became known for accepting the cases of poor clients. In 1871 Dean moved to a farm in Putnam County, Missouri, which he named ‘Rebel Cove'. He gathered a great library which was later destroyed by fire.

== Death and legacy ==
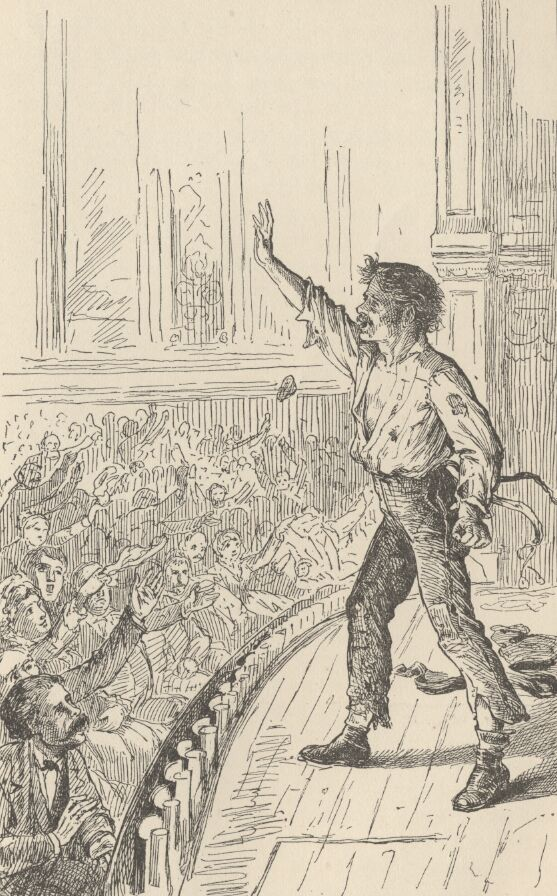
Henry Clay Dean as depicted by Mark Twain in Life on the Mississippi

Here is what Mark Twain had to say on the subject of Henry Clay Dean:

"He began life poor and without education. But he educated himself - on the curbstones of Keokuk. He would sit down on a curbstone with his book, careless or unconscious of the clatter of commerce and the tramp of the passing crowds, and bury himself in his studies by the hour, never changing his position except to draw in his knees now and then to let a dray pass unobstructed; and when his book was finished, its contents, however abstruse, had been burned into his memory, and were his permanent possession. In this way he acquired a vast hoard of all sorts of learning, and had it pigeonholed in his head where he could put his intellectual hand on it whenever it was wanted. His clothes differed in no respect from a "wharf-rat's," except that they were raggeder, more ill-assorted and inharmonious (and therefore more extravagantly picturesque), and several layers dirtier. Nobody could infer the master-mind in the top of that edifice from the edifice itself.

He was an orator - by nature in the first place, and later by the training of experience and practice. When he was out on a canvass, his name was a lodestone which drew the farmers to his stump from fifty miles around. His theme was always politics. He used no notes, for a volcano does not need notes." - Life on the Mississippi

Religious titles
Preceded by Henry Slicer	38th US Senate Chaplain; December 4, 1855 – December 8, 1856	Succeeded by Stephen P. Hill
