= Phineas Densmore Gurley =

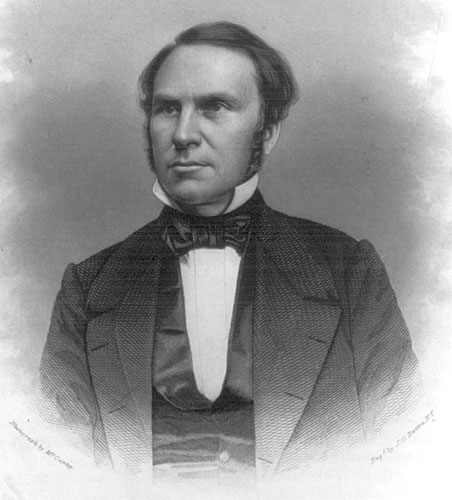
- Phineas Gurley, pastor of NYAPC, 1860–1868, was a spiritual advisor to Abraham Lincoln

40th Chaplain of the United States Senate
- In office December 15, 1859 – July 10, 1861
- President: James Buchanan; Abraham Lincoln
- Preceded by: Stephen P. Hill
- Succeeded by: Byron Sunderland

Personal details
- Born: November 12, 1816 Hamilton, New York, U.S.
- Died: September 30, 1868 (aged 51) Washington, D.C., U.S.
- Spouse: Emma Brooks
- Children: 5
- Education: Union College

Phineas Densmore Gurley (November 12, 1816 – September 30, 1868) was Chaplain of the United States Senate and pastor of New York Avenue Presbyterian Church in Washington, D.C.

== Early life ==
Gurley was born in Hamilton, New York, on November 12, 1816, the son of Phineas and Elizabeth (née Fox) Gurley. Gurley graduated from Union College in Schenectady, New York, in 1837, with the highest honors of his class, and from Princeton Theological Seminary in 1840.

== Ministry ==
Gurley served First Presbyterian Church in Indianapolis, Indiana, (1840–1849) and First Presbyterian Church, in Dayton, Ohio, (1850–1854). In 1854, Gurley accepted a call from the F Street Church in Washington, D. C., which in 1859 was united with the Second Presbyterian Church, to become the New York Avenue Presbyterian Church. Gurley continued to be the pastor of the merged congregation until his death.

In 1859, he was chosen Chaplain of the United States Senate; one of fourteen Presbyterians to hold that office, to date. Gurley numbered among his worshiping congregation President Abraham Lincoln and Mary Todd Lincoln. Lincoln was a pew holder and regular attender but not a member of the church. Gurley and his wife were frequent guests at the White House. Gurley was at Lincoln's deathbed and accompanied Mrs. Lincoln when she informed her son, Tad, of Lincoln's death. Gurley later compared the experience of the assassination with a major battle: I "felt as though I had been engaged all night in a terrible Battle and had just strength enough to drag myself off the field." He preached his funeral sermon on April 19, 1865, at the White House, lauding Lincoln for his commitment to American ideals:

We admired and loved him on many accounts, for strong and various reasons. We admired his childlike simplicity, his freedom from guile and deceit, his staunch and sterling integrity, his kind and forgiving temper, his industry and patience, his persistent, self-sacrificing devotion to all the duties of his eminent position, from the least to the greatest; his readiness to hear and consider the cause of the poor and humble, the suffering and the oppressed; his charity toward those who questioned the correctness of his opinions and the wisdom of his policy; his wonderful skill in reconciling differences among the friends of the Union, leading them away from abstractions, and inducing them to work together and harmoniously for the common weal; his true and enlarged philanthropy, that knew no distinction of color or race, but regarded all men as brethren...

Gurley was known for his beautiful singing voice and powerful oratory skill.

Gurley took an active part in the negotiations that resulted in the union of the Old School and New School branches of the Presbyterian Church. Gurley continued to serve as pastor of the New York Avenue Presbyterian Church until his death in Washington, D.C., on September 30, 1868. He spent the last two years as moderator of the Presbyterian Church.

== Personal life ==
Gurley married Emma Brooks on October 9, 1840. Both were natives of New York. Their children were: Frances Mary Gurley, William Brooks Gurley, Hosea Mellville Gurley, Charles Lawrence Gurley and Emma Harrison Gurley.

== Archival collections ==
The Presbyterian Historical Society in Philadelphia, Pennsylvania, has a collection of Gurley's sermons, correspondences, and photographs.

== Additional references ==
- mrlincolnswhitehouse.org
- David Rankin Barbee, "President Lincoln and Doctor Gurley", The Abraham Lincoln Quarterly, March 1948, Volume. V, No. 1.
- Allen C. Guelzo, Abraham Lincoln: Redeemer President, p. 321.
- DeWitt Jones, Lincoln and the Preachers, p. 37.

Religious titles
Preceded by Stephen P. Hill	40th US Senate Chaplain; December 15, 1859 – July 10, 1861	Succeeded by Byron Sunderland
Presbyterian Church titles
Preceded by Robert L. Stanton	Moderator of the 79th General Assembly of the Presbyterian Church in the United States of America (Old School); 1867–1868	Succeeded by George W. Musgrave
