= Gideon Blackburn =

American clergyman (1772–1838)

The Reverend Gideon Blackburn
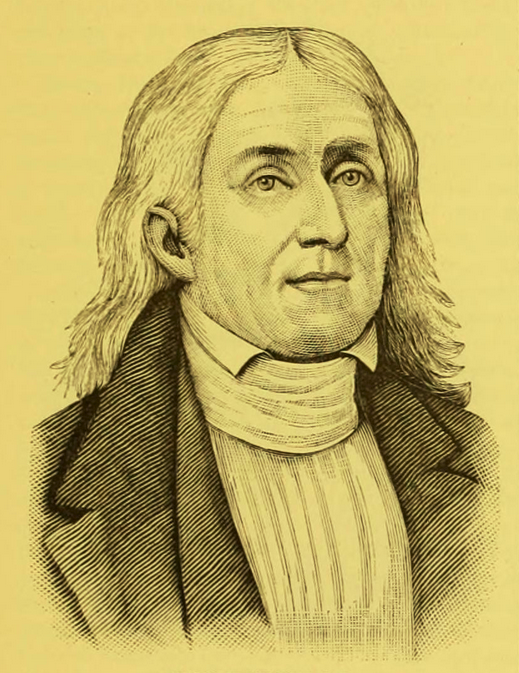

3rd President of Centre College
- In office November 5, 1827 – October 26, 1830
- Preceded by: Jeremiah Chamberlain
- Succeeded by: John C. Young

Personal details
- Born: August 27, 1772 Augusta County, Virginia, U.S.
- Died: August 23, 1838 (aged 65) Carlinville, Illinois, U.S.
- Spouse: Grizzel Blackburn (m. 1793)
- Children: 11
- Education: Martin Academy; Dickinson College

Gideon Blackburn (August 27, 1772 – August 23, 1838) was an American Presbyterian minister, missionary, educator, and academic administrator. He raised funds for new colleges and founded numerous congregations and churches in areas of new western settlement in Tennessee and Kentucky.

== Early life and education ==
Gideon Blackburn was born in Augusta County, Virginia, on August 27, 1772. He moved with his parents to East Tennessee before he was orphaned aged 11. (Note: Sources disagree on the timing of his move to Tennessee; McLoughlin (1984) says he moved to Tennessee with his uncle in 1787, several years after his parents' deaths.) He worked at a sawmill and as a surveyor to obtain an education, first under the minister Robert Henderson at Martin Academy in Washington County, Tennessee, and then at Dickinson College in Carlisle, Pennsylvania.

== Career ==
- Aged 20 (c.1792-93) moved near Maryville, Tennessee, founded New Providence Church plus a farm and distillery
- 1792 received his preacher's license; served as militia chaplain during Cherokee–American wars during last two years
- 1794 ordained by Abingdon Presbytery of Virginia and became pastor of small churches in Maryville (New Providence?) and Eusebia, Tennessee
- Congregations grew significantly near the turn of the century, leading him to consider missionary work with Cherokees
- Spring 1803 granted $200 sum (equivalent to $4,300 in 2025) and $33.33 annual salary (equivalent to $720 in 2025) from Presbyterian Church General Assembly for the mission project
  - Secured $200–300 (equivalent to $4,300–6,450 in 2025) in further funding from president Thomas Jefferson through Return J. Meigs Sr., the U.S. Indian agent to the Cherokee
  - Also got $430 sum (equivalent to $9,250 in 2025) from "private donors in the East"
- Arrived as a mission to the Cherokee in fall 1803, four years after the Moravians had made their offer of help
- Blackburn proposed opening school for Cherokee children; approved by the Cherokee council in October 1803 for a 2-year trial with instruction to build near the Hiwassee River
- Began Cherokee mission 1804 and opened Cherokee school in February 1804 with eleven students (grew quickly to 25)
- March 1806 began a second school near Sale Creek, Tennessee, roughly 20 miles (32 km) south of the original school
  - Solicited visit to the school from John Sevier
  - Schools emphasized linguistics and mathematics for boys, and homemaking for girls, with an emphasis on Christian doctrine (particularly Christian hymns) and general cultural assimilation (get specific or several cites for that)
    - From 1805–10 taught reading, writing, and arithmetic with attendance ranging from 30 to 40, while Blackburn toured the south raising money
  - Utilized strict corporal punishment
- Heavily involved in Cherokee politics, pushed laws regarding polygamy, abortion, and private property; he aimed to force the Cherokee to marry in traditional Christian ceremonies and to "[prevent] easy divorce"; also aimed to change Cherokee matrilineal society into a patrilineal one
  - Was an advocate for legislatively mandating "observance of the Sabbath"
- 1809 whiskey scandal involving his brother, John McIntosh and Major Ridge caused his schools to close
- Admirer of the Cherokee chief Doublehead and was so upset by his assassination in 1807 that he wrote to war secretary Henry Dearborn
  - Doublehead was killed in Blackburn's schoolhouse building
  - This event prompted Blackburn to petition the United States Department of War for permission to move the Hiwassee River school to Tellico Blockhouse, which they agreed to
- Resigned mission by 1810; moved to West Tennessee and became head of Harpeth Academy, Franklin, Tennessee
- Founded Presbyterian Church in Nashville, 1814; Presbyterian Church in Huntsville, Alabama, 1818 (first Presby. church in Alabama Territory)

Blackburn was elected a member of the American Antiquarian Society in July 1815.

=== Kentucky and Indiana, 1823–1837 ===
- Moved with his family to Louisville, Kentucky, to become pastor of the First Church of Louisville
- Elected president of the young Centre College on August 1, 1827, and took office on November 5 of that year. He resigned on October 26, 1830.
- He then served again as a minister, at Versailles, Kentucky (1830–33). During these years he also an agent for the Kentucky State Temperance Society.
- Invited to Carlinville, Illinois, in 1833, to help fundraise for Illinois College. In addition he founded two more congregations.

== Marriage and family ==
In 1793 Blackburn married his cousin, Grizzel Blackburn, with whom he had seven daughters and four sons.

== Legacy and honors ==
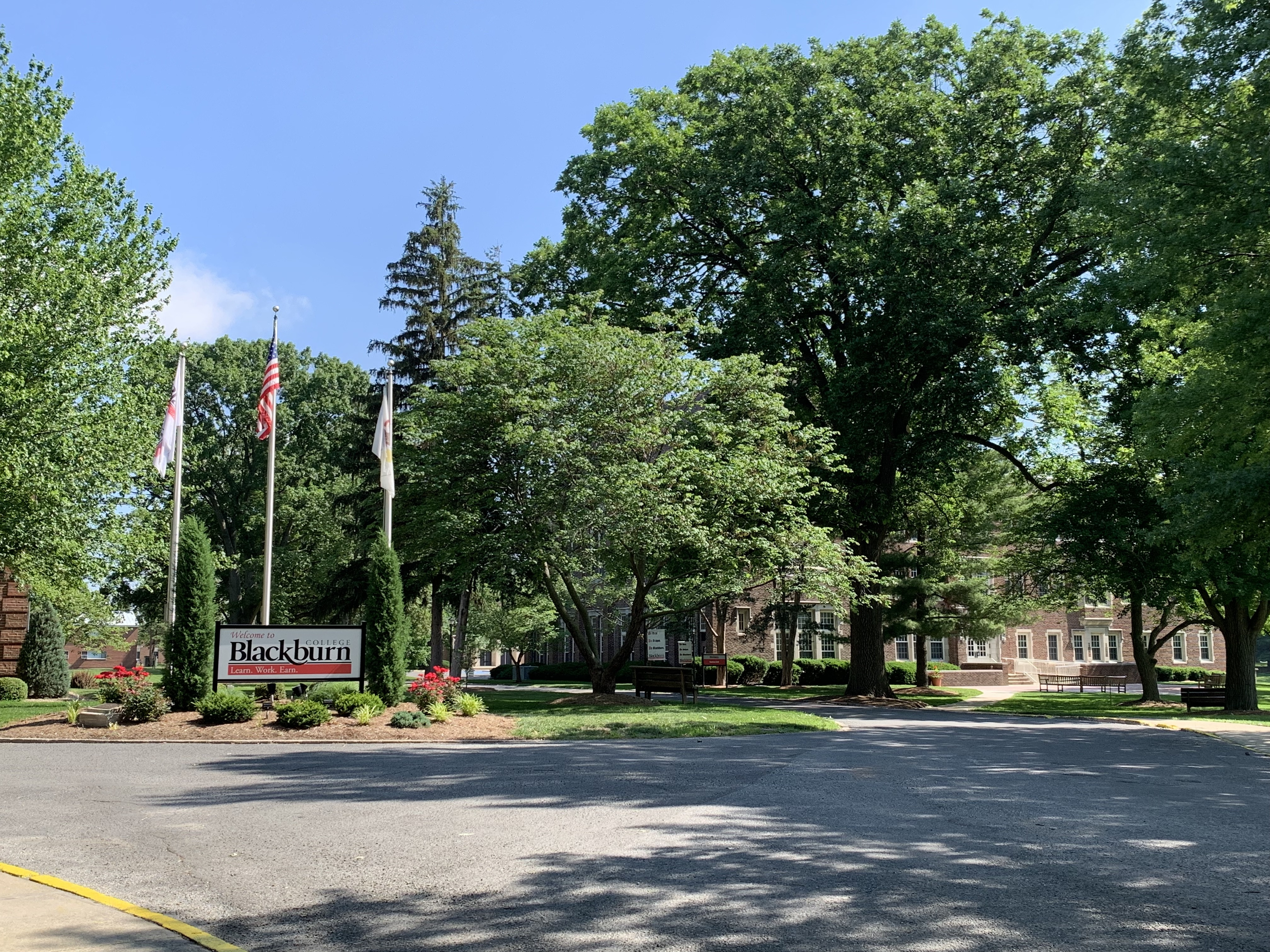
Entrance to Blackburn College (pictured 2019)

Blackburn established numerous new congregations and churches in Tennessee and Kentucky. He was part of a movement to create community among new settlements of migrants from further East.

- In 1859 Blackburn Theological Seminary, now Blackburn College, in Carlinville, Illinois was named after him.
- Blackburn was a great-uncle to Kentucky Governor Luke P. Blackburn.
- Tended to overexaggerate the impact of his schools, the number of students taught, and the speed at which they learned English
