= Oakland College (Mississippi) =

Defunct private college near Rodney, Mississippi

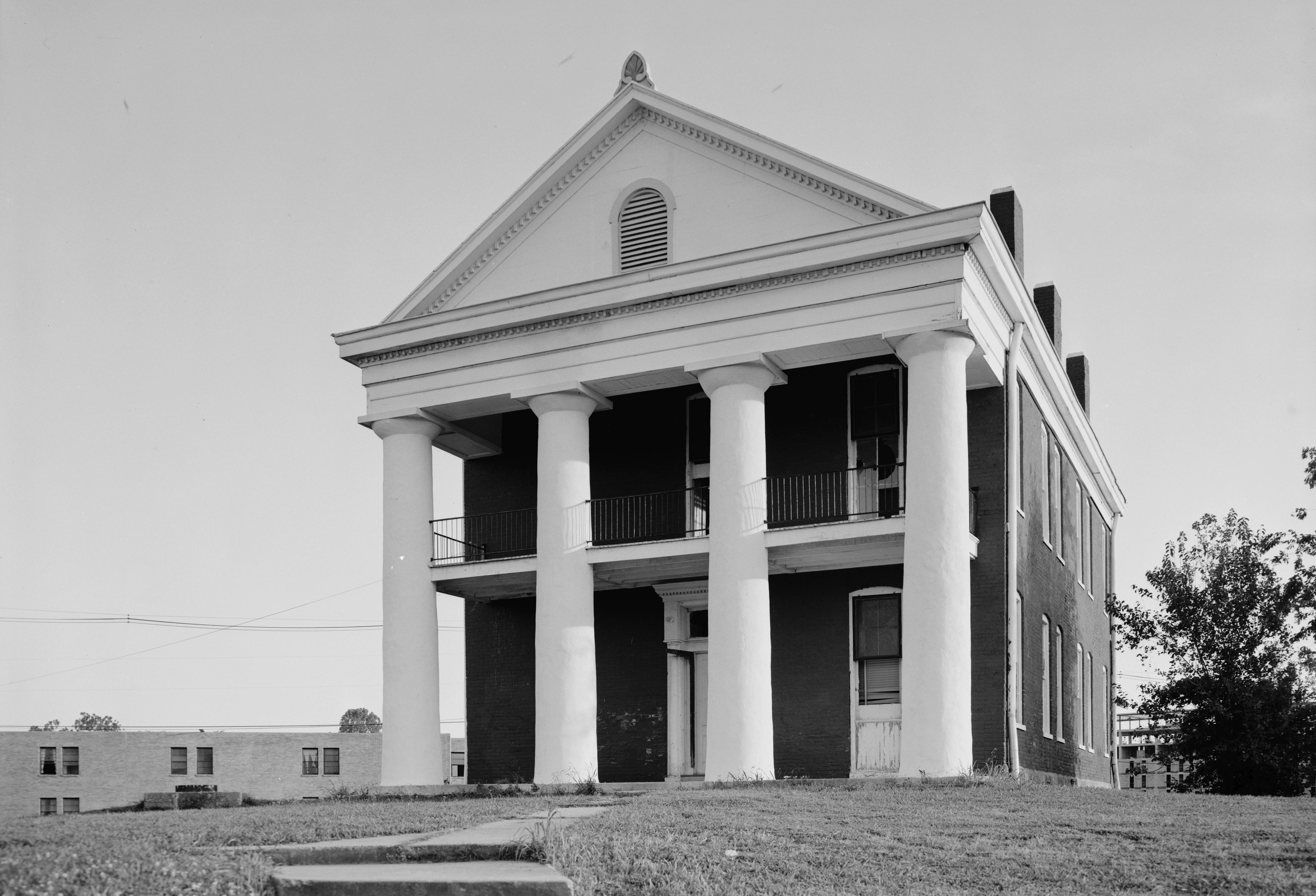
- Main façade of Belles Lettres, 1972
- Type: Private college
- Active: 1830–1871
- Founder: Jeremiah Chamberlain
- Religious affiliation: Presbyterian
- Location: Near Rodney, Mississippi, United States; 31°52′33.5″N 91°08′24.1″W
- Campus: 250 acres (0.39 sq mi; 101.17 ha); Rural town

Oakland College was a private college near Rodney, Mississippi, United States. Founded by Jeremiah Chamberlain in 1830, the school was affiliated with the Presbyterian Church. It closed during Reconstruction, and some of its former campus is now part of the Alcorn State University Historic District.

== History ==
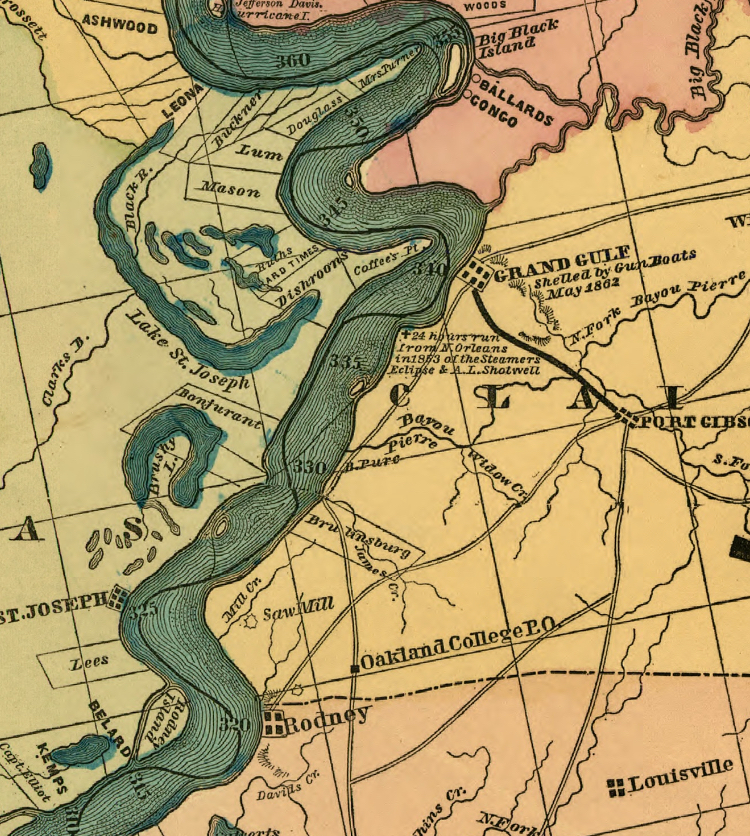
Map showing the location of Oakland College circa 1862

=== Founding ===
Oakland College was founded as a college for young men by the Presbyterian Church in 1830. They hired Jeremiah Chamberlain, a Presbyterian minister educated at Dickinson College and the Princeton Theological Seminary, as the first President. Chamberlain had served as the president of Centre College and the College of Louisiana. More recently, he had served as the pastor of Bethel Presbyterian Church in nearby Alcorn, Mississippi.

=== Antebellum period ===
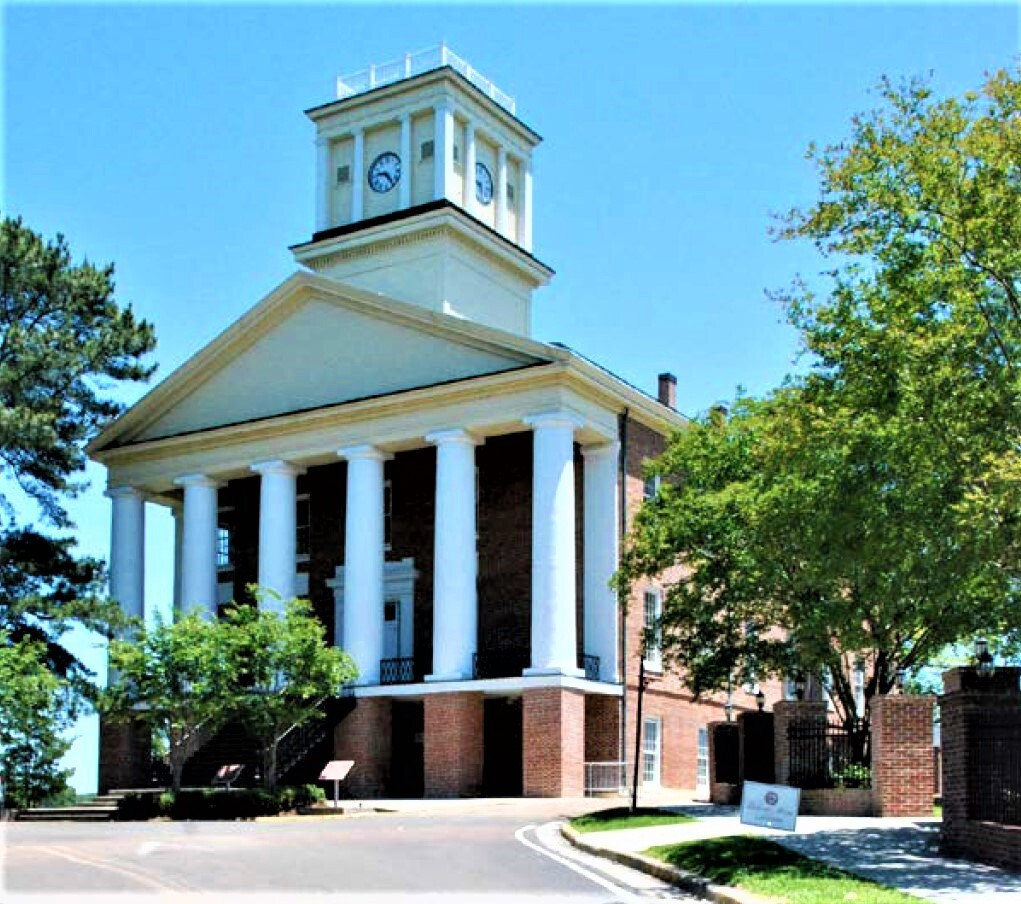
The Oakland Memorial Chapel - now a part of Alcorn State University

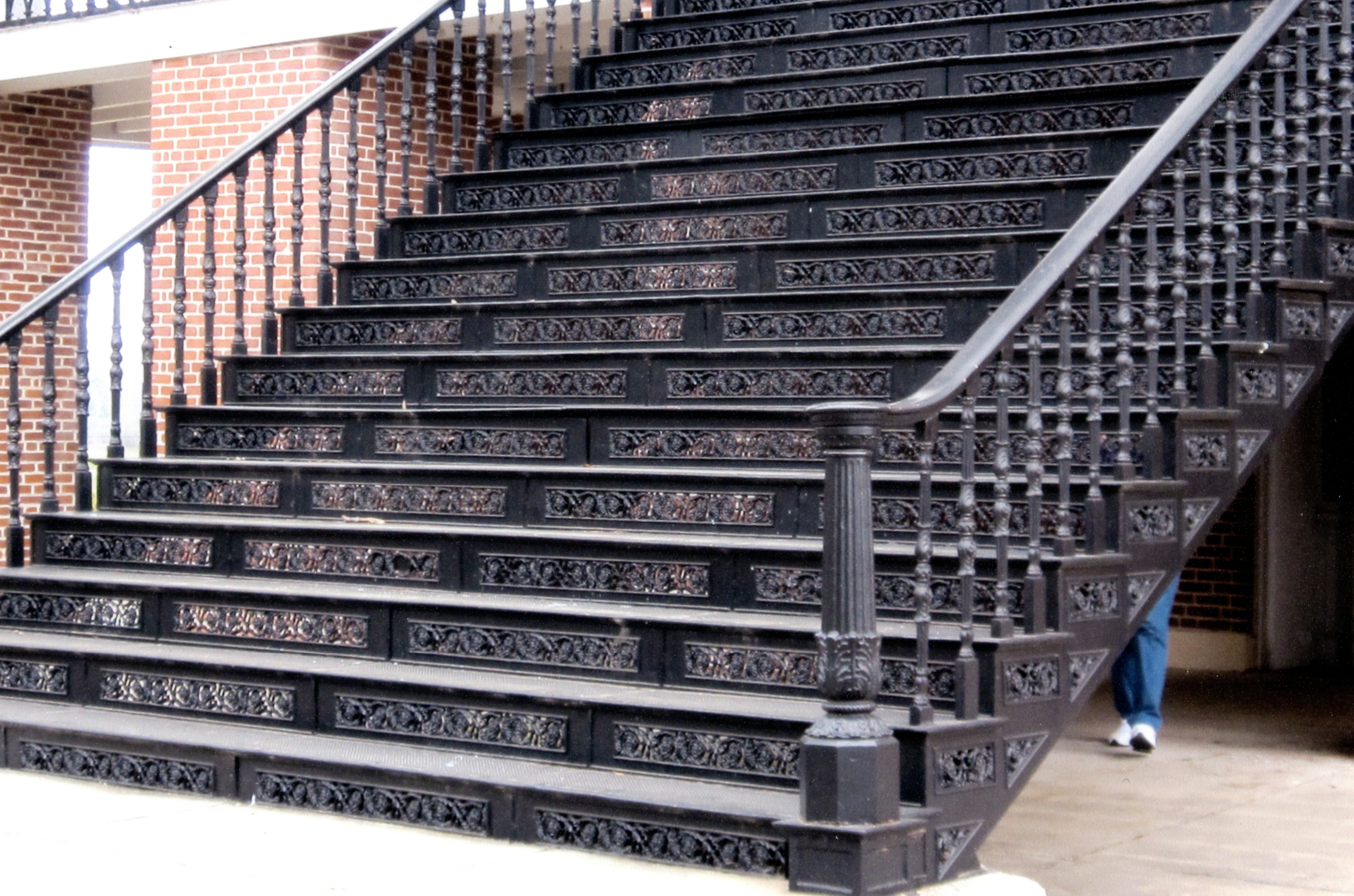
Windsor Plantation Mansion's stairs - relocated to the front of the Oakland College Memorial Chapel now part of Alcorn State University - 2013

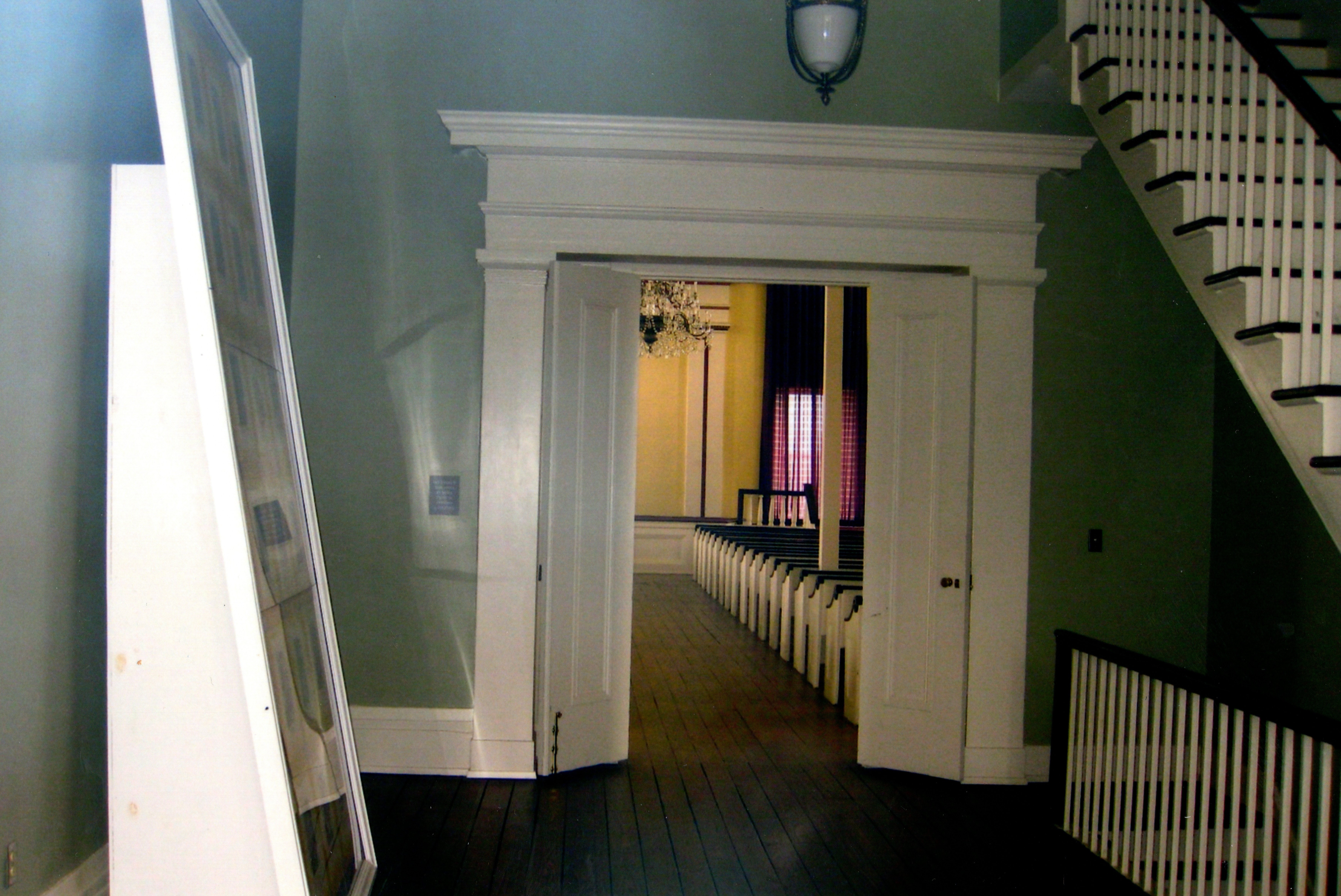
Oakland Chapel Interior

The college was endowed by planters such as Rush Nutt of the Laurel Hill Plantation, Smith Daniell of the Windsor Plantation, and Isaac Ross of Prospect Hill Plantation, as well as David Hunt of the Woodlawn Plantation. Moreover, John Ker donated US$25,000 (equivalent to US$756,000 in 2025) for a Professorship in Theology. The land, spanning 250 acres (0.39 sq mi; 101.17 ha), was donated by planter Robert Cochran. The Oakland Memorial Chapel was built in 1838. (The wrought iron staircase was moved from the Windsor Plantation to the chapel in 1890.) It served not only as a chapel, but also as a library, with additional space for classrooms and offices. The chapel became a National Historic Landmark in 1976. Over the years, more buildings were erected, such as a president's house, three professor's houses, and 15 cottages, which served as dormitories for students.

The first class took place on May 14, 1830, at the private residence of Mrs John E. Dromgoole, the wife of a slave trader, with three students attending. Six months later, 22 students were enrolled. Over the years, more than 1000 students were educated at the college. According to historian Mary Carol Miller, its alumni pool included "twenty-one ministers, thirty-nine attorneys, and nineteen physicians." John Chamberlain taught English and Mathematics. In 1837, Rev. Zebulon Butler became Professor of Theology. He was later replaced by Rev. S. Beach Jones.

The first student to graduate in 1833 was James M. Smiley; he went on to serve as Vice Chancellor of the state of Mississippi. Notable alumni include Henry Hughes, who developed the economic notion of "warrantism". Another notable alumni was James S. Johnston, later a bishop of the Episcopal Church and the founder of West Texas Military Academy, a private school in San Antonio, Texas. Hiram B. Granbury, an attorney who served as a Brigadier General in the Confederate States Army during the Civil War, was also an alumni.

Tensions arose regarding slavery in the early 1850s. President Chamberlain was a Unionist and an abolitionist. He was stabbed to death by George Briscoe, a pro-slavery local planter. Briscoe apparently felt remorse and committed suicide a week later.

For the 1858–1859 school year, according to an old prospectus, tuition was $30 per term, "boarding and washing, $18 per month," with a graduating fee of $10. Students could purchase firewood for $2 per cord.

=== Civil War and Reconstruction ===
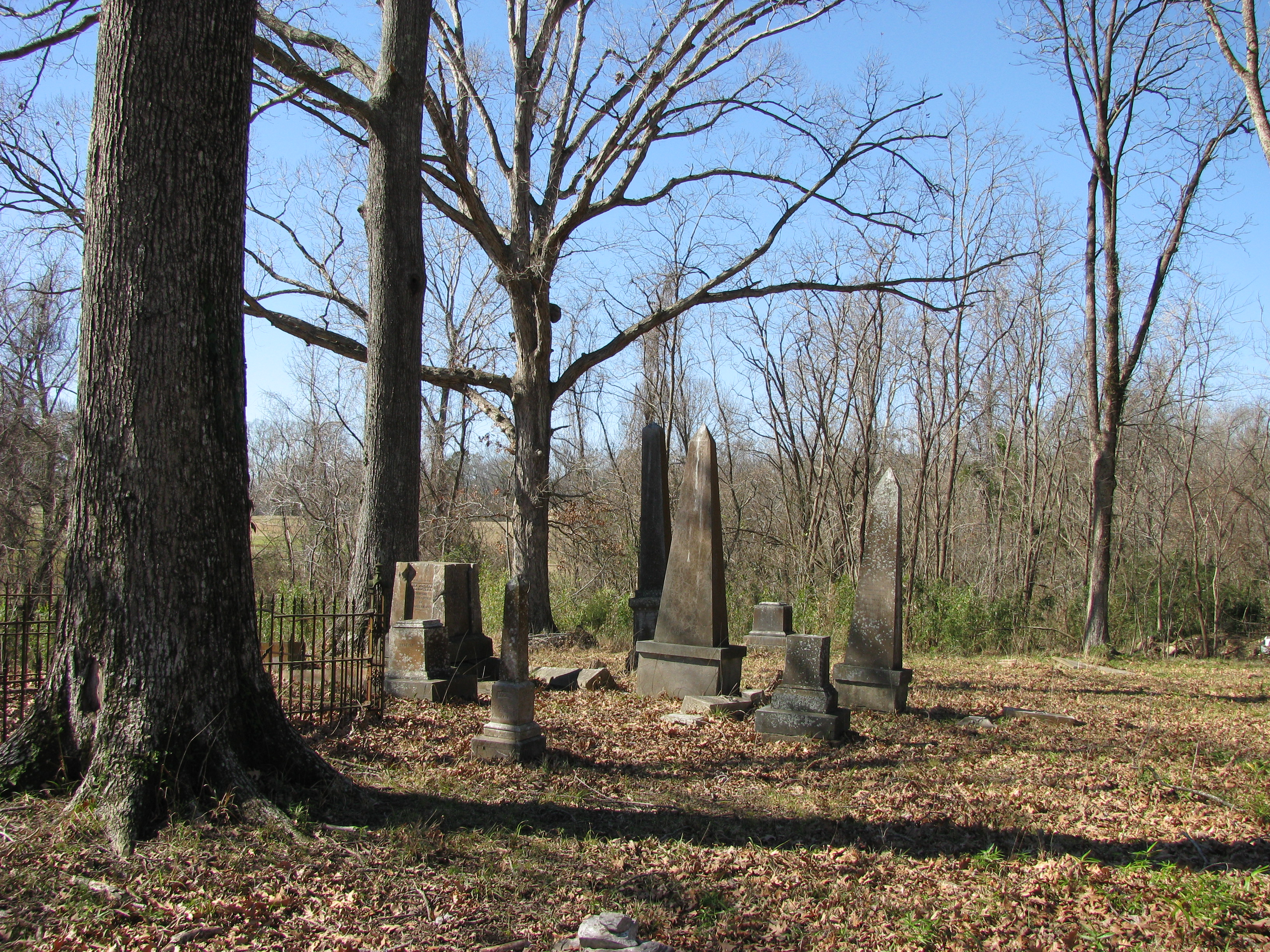
Oakland College Cemetery, 2009

The college stayed open until the American Civil War of 1861–1865, despite financial difficulties. The second President was Robert L. Stanton, from 1851 to 1854. The third President was James Purviance. In 1860, William L. Breckinridge became the fourth President, serving until the Civil War. The college closed during the war, as students and faculty either joined the Confederate States Army, or were slain for their pro-Unionist views. The campus was used as a military camp and its infrastructure was badly damaged. Shortly after the war, Rev. Joseph Calvin became the fifth President. He died shortly after being appointed, and the college again fell into abeyance.

In 1871, the campus was sold to the state of Mississippi for US$40,000 (equivalent to US$1,075,000 in 2025) to become Alcorn State University.

== Buildings and sites ==
A cemetery and historical marker are located on the western end of the site. Burials include Jeremiah Chamberlain, his wife, and his four daughters. His tombstone reads, "the beloved father of Oakland College." A memorial obelisk was erected in honor of Chamberlain.

== Legacy ==
The Reconstruction legislature purchased the campus and used it as the location of Alcorn University in honor of Republican governor James L. Alcorn. It established this as a land grant institution and historically black college. It was the first black land grant college in the nation. Congress required states with segregated educational systems to establish black land grant colleges so that all students had opportunities in order for the state to qualify for gaining land grant benefits.

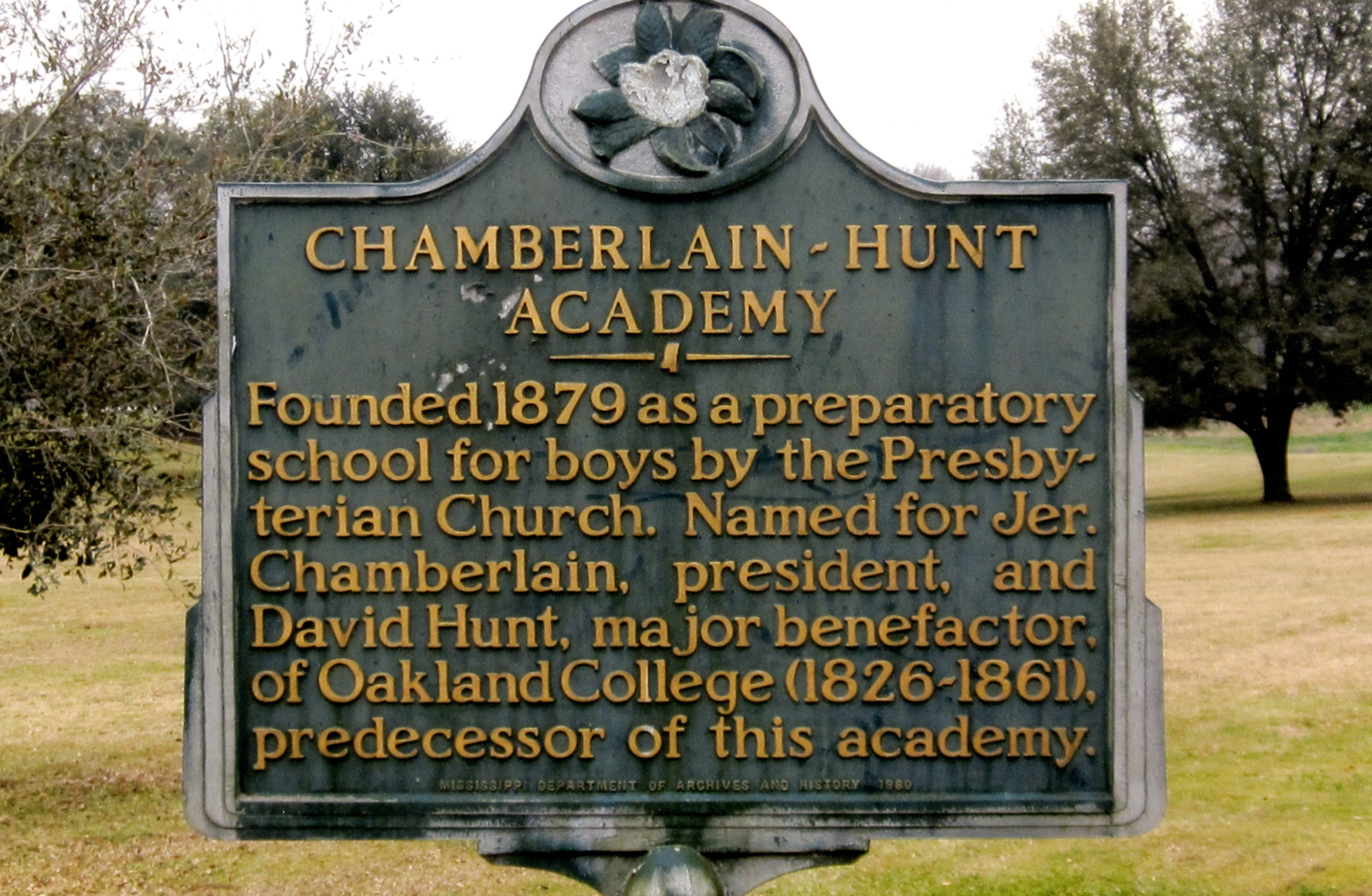
Chamberlain - Hunt Academy Historic Marker

After Reconstruction, the Presbyterian Church established Chamberlain-Hunt Academy in 1879, a military private school located in Port Gibson, Mississippi. It was named in honor of minister and educator Jeremiah Chamberlain and planter David Hunt.

Two reports about Oakland College from the faculty, the trustees, and the Presbyterian synod of Mississippi are preserved at the Louis Round Wilson Special Collections Library on the campus of the University of North Carolina at Chapel Hill at Chapel Hill. The college curriculum is preserved at the Mississippi Department of Archives & History at Jackson.
