= Port Gibson Correspondent =

Mississippi newspaper (1818–1848)

The Port Gibson Correspondent was a newspaper published in Port Gibson, Mississippi, United States from 1818 until 1847 or 1848. The Port Gibson Correspondent was the first newspaper published in Claiborne County, and Port Gibson was only the second town in Mississippi to have a newspaper, after Natchez. The Correspondent was a four-page, six-column weekly when it was started by W. A. A. Chisholm. According to a history of journalism in Claiborne County, after changing editors several times over the years, "In 1844 the paper fell into the hands of James A. Gage and Samuel F. Boyd. Mr. Gage, a South Carolinian, was a life-long citizen of Port Gibson, dying while on a visit to Texas in 1891. In 1845 W. B. Tebo became editor and proprietor and so continued until September, 1848, when he sold the Correspondent to W. H. Jacobs, editor of the P. G. Herald, with which sheet it was consolidated under the title of Herald and Correspondent. The Correspondent thus had a separate and continuous existence of thirty years, an age that no other Port Gibson paper has attained. Mr. Tebo removed to Natchez and then to New Orleans where his descendants still live." At the time of statehood in 1817, Port Gibson was the second-biggest town in Mississippi (after Natchez), suggesting that its major newspaper would have been a leading media outlet for the entire region.
