= Chamberlain-Hunt Academy =

School in Port Gibson, Claiborne, Mississippi, US

Location
- 124 McComb Ave; Port Gibson, Claiborne, MS 39150; 31°56′45″N 90°59′10″W

Information
- School type: Private Boarding
- Motto: Knowledge and Wisdom in Submission to God
- Established: 1879
- Closed: 2014
- President: Jim Montgomery
- Dean: Wesley McClure
- Headmaster: Keith Fraley
- Teaching staff: 8
- Grades: 7–12
- Gender: Male (coeducational until 2002)
- Enrollment: 4 (2014)
- Average class size: 5
- Campus size: 174 acres (70 ha)
- Athletics conference: MAIS
- Sports: Soccer, Basketball, Track, Cross-Country, Golf, and Tennis
- Team name: Wildcats
- Accreditation: SACS, MAIS
- Website: www.chamberlain-hunt.com

Chamberlain-Hunt Academy was a boarding school in Port Gibson, Mississippi. The school was founded in 1830 as Oakland College and closed in 2014.

The campus, with its buildings in brick Georgian Revival style, is listed in the National Register of Historic Places.

== History ==
=== Early history ===
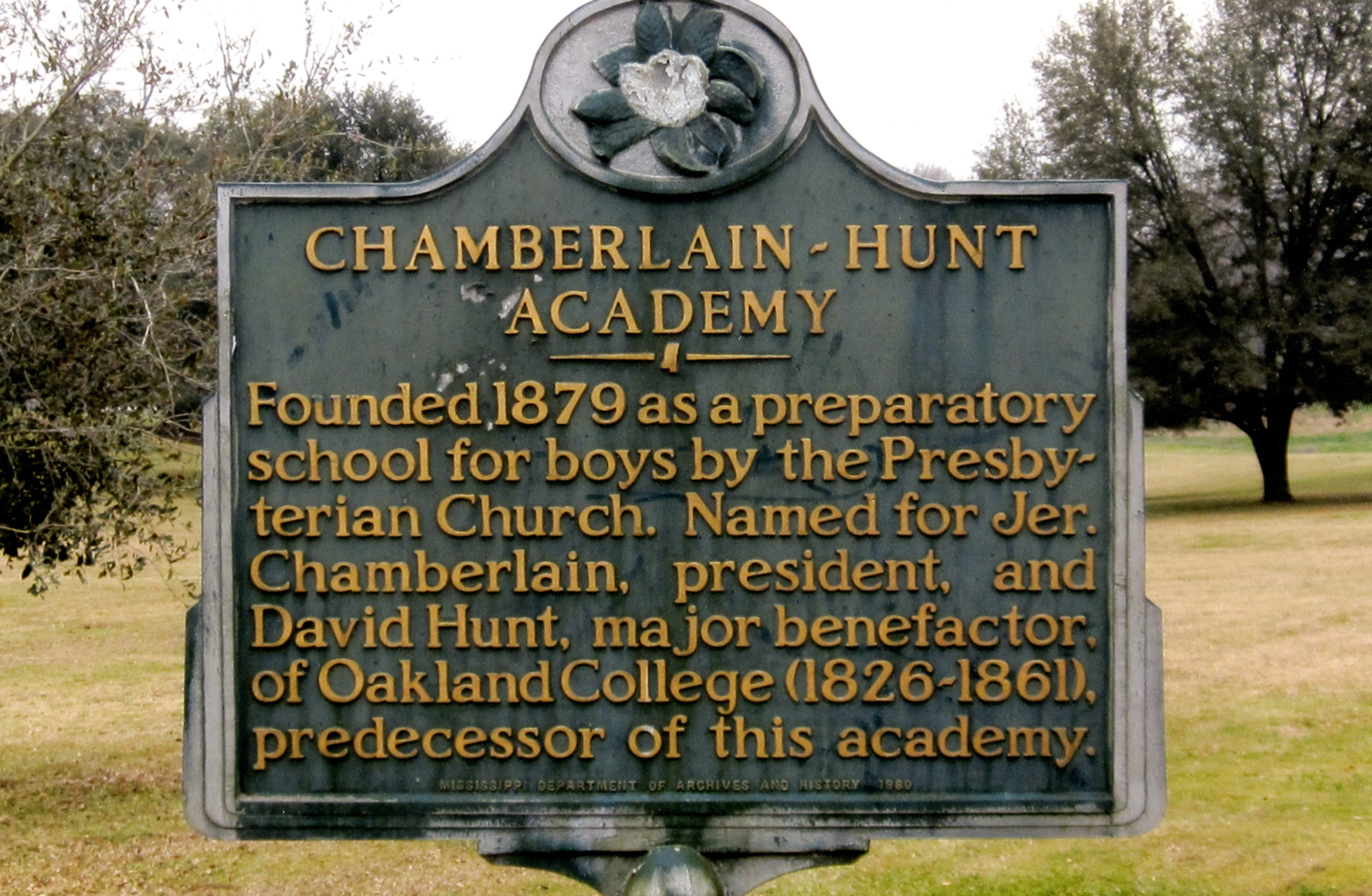
Chamberlain - Hunt Academy Historic Marker

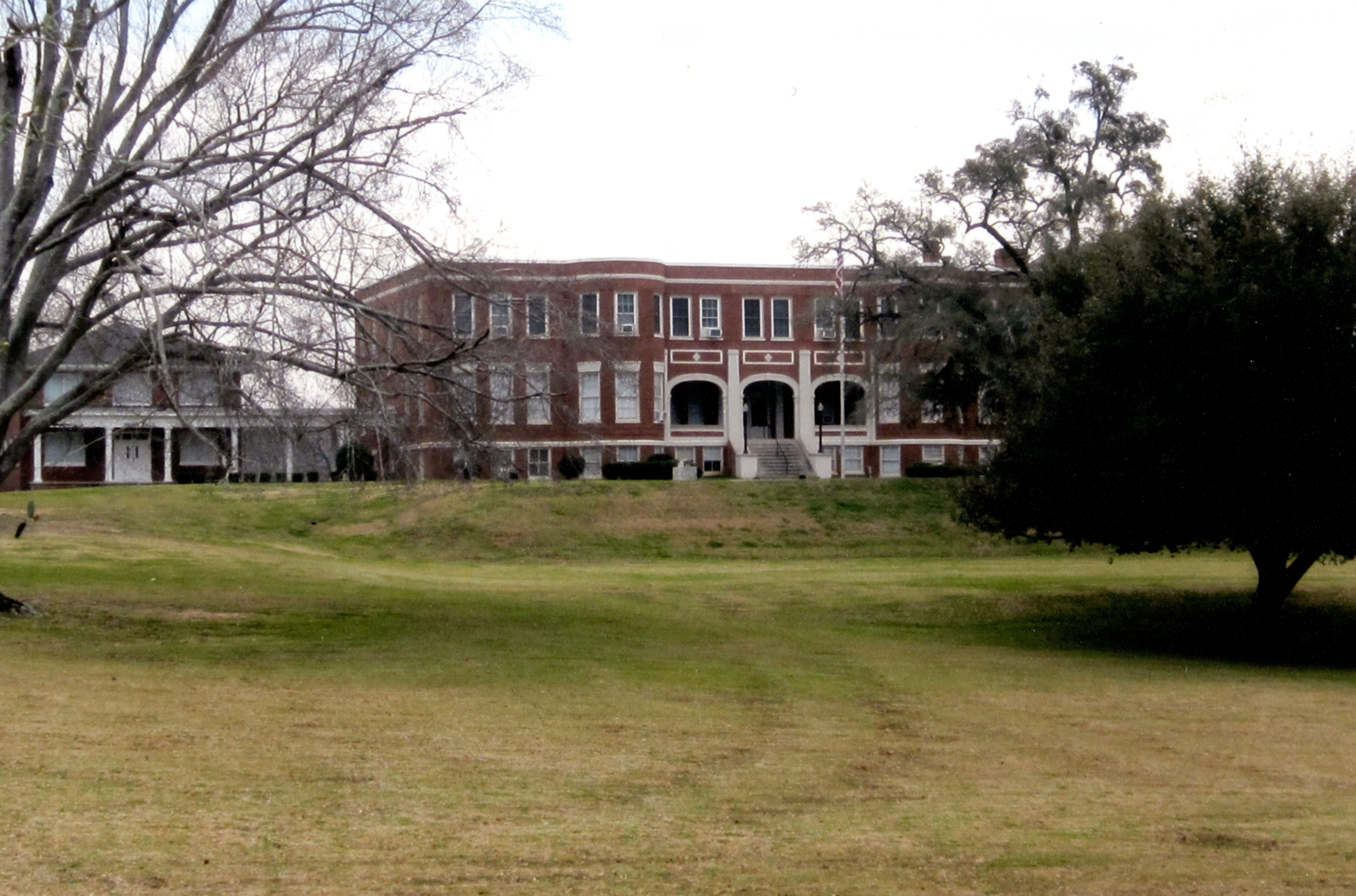
Chamberlain Hunt Academy - 2013

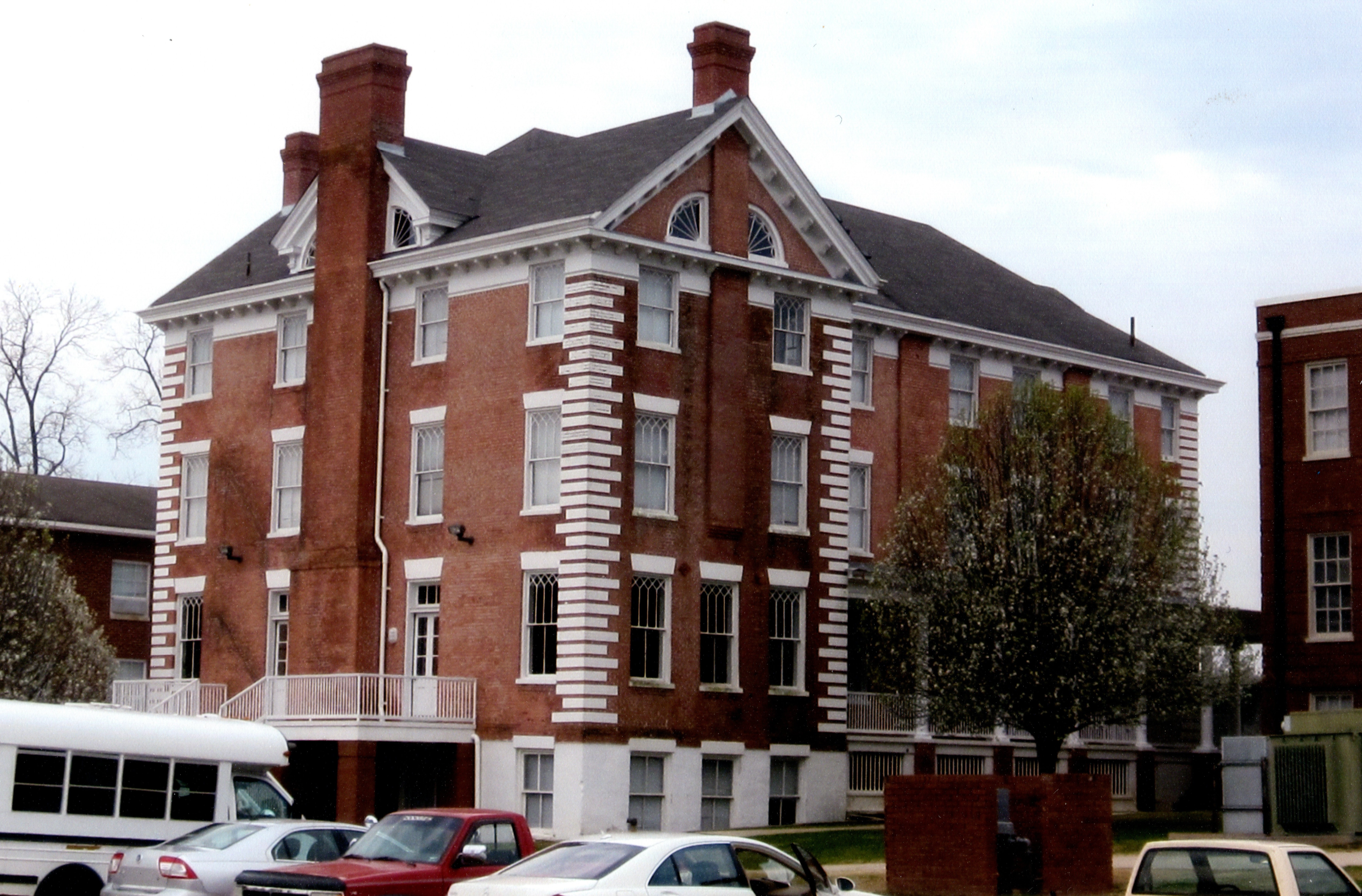
Chamberlain Hunt Academy - 2013

Oakland College was founded in Lorman, Mississippi in 1830 by the Reverend Jeremiah Chamberlain and the Presbyterian Church in Mississippi. Oakland closed during the Civil War but was reborn nearby in 1879 in historic Port Gibson, Mississippi as Chamberlain-Hunt Academy .

When the "new" school was founded in Port Gibson in 1879, funds for the new beginning came from both the sale of the Oakland campus and donors. The State of Mississippi paid $40,000 for the campus in order to create Alcorn A&M College, the first land-grant college for African Americans in American history. Alcorn State University thrives in its original location.

The new foundation was named in honor of Dr. Jeremiah Chamberlain (1794–1851), the founder of Oakland College, and David Hunt (1779–1861), a prominent Antebellum plantation owner and major benefactor of the institution. Although Hunt and his family held 1,700 African-American slaves, the Oakland campus he helped build later became the site of a state-supported institution for the higher education of freedmen. Today, Alcorn State University continues to operate on the original campus as part of this legacy.

Several of Chamberlain-Hunt Academy's early faculty hailed from Davidson College, a Presbyterian foundation in North Carolina. The curriculum was traditional college prep.

In 1915, CHA transitioned to the military discipline and was a traditional boys military prep school until 1971, when females were admitted and the military routine greatly relaxed. CHA was transitioning in a way similar to Baylor and McCallie Schools in Tennessee, which became wholly civilian prep schools. CHA retained a Corps of Cadets. In 1996, when persons associated with French Camp Academy in north Mississippi purchased CHA, the trustees returned the school to its all-male, all military, and mostly boarding-student situation. The new owners of the school had a good thing going and put several millions of dollars into the physical plant.

Chamberlain-Hunt was what is termed a regional boarding school. While students always came from far away and overseas, the majority of patrons were families living up and down the Mississippi River, from Memphis to New Orleans. Not a few of the students over the years came from agricultural families living in the Mississippi and Arkansas Deltas, the black-land region around Columbus, Aberdeen, and Starkville, and other fertile farm country in both states and Louisiana. Many students have come from Claiborne County and the River Counties of Mississippi, and River Parishes of Louisiana. Heirs of the original founders of Oakland were attending the school in the 1970s.

The faculty of CHA were prepared to welcome students of different gifts and intellectual levels, successfully preparing boys (and later girls) for the most selective colleges in the United States but giving less talented students a first-class education addressing the whole person. The diversity of the school was limited until the late 1980s, when African Americans matriculated for the first time. For all of its years, Chamberlain-Hunt trained and produced leaders.

=== Racial segregation and gender integration ===
In 1971, the school began accepting female students, likely driven by the racial desegregation of public schools. CHA stopped accepting female boarding students in 2002. However, they did allow female students to attend as day students until 2005, after which they stopped accepting additional girls to the school. 2004-05 had a total of 8 female cadets.

=== Reorganization and closing ===
The school went into a decline in the 1990s, when enrollment fell to just 22 students ref. One observer remarked that, while McComb Hall had serious deferred maintenance, the Senior Speeches and college admission profile of the Class of 1990 were as impressive as always. In 1996 it was saved from closure by being taken over by French Camp Academy, another Christian (but not military) boarding school in northern Mississippi. However, CHA continued to operate autonomously. At the time, it had approximately 40% ethnic minority enrollment.

On its 125th birthday in 2004, CHA held a Founders' Day Convocation at nearby Alcorn State University (whose premises are on the Academy's original pre-1900 site) with special guest, US Senator Trent Lott.

The school was sold in 2014 to a private individual and did not open for the 2014–2015 session. The school was reopened again in 2024 as Chamberlain Hunt American Academy. It has gained accreditation by GEAC body for national and international education for grades K6 to K12 and provides on-campus and online classes. The new administration are international educators who are very optimistic about the future.

== Academics ==
Chamberlain Hunt American Academy was a member of the Southern Association of Colleges and Schools (SACS), the Mississippi Association of Independent Schools (MAIS), the Global Education Association Commission (GEAC), the Association of Military Colleges and Schools of the United States (AMCSUS), and the Association of Classical Christian Schools.

== Notable alumni ==
- Reverend Dunbar Hunt Ogden, Great Orator and Moderator of the Southern Presbyterian Church, and grandson of David Hunt
- George Henry Clinton (class of 1885), member of both houses of the Louisiana State Legislature in first quarter of the 20th century; chemist and lawyer in St. Joseph, Louisiana
- Happy Foreman, Major League Baseball player
- Ken Kercheval (b. 1935), actor best known for playing Cliff Barnes in the CBS television drama Dallas
- John Milliken Parker, governor of Louisiana from 1920 to 1924
- Major General Martha Trim Rainville, first woman in the history of the National Guard to serve as a state Adjutant General.
- Donald Scott (1894–1980), career United States Army officer; participated in the 1920 and 1924 Olympic Games; namesake of Scott Field at Mississippi State
- Lars Eighner, author of a memoir of his time at Chamberlain-Hunt Academy
