= James McChord =

American minister and educator

The Reverend James McChord
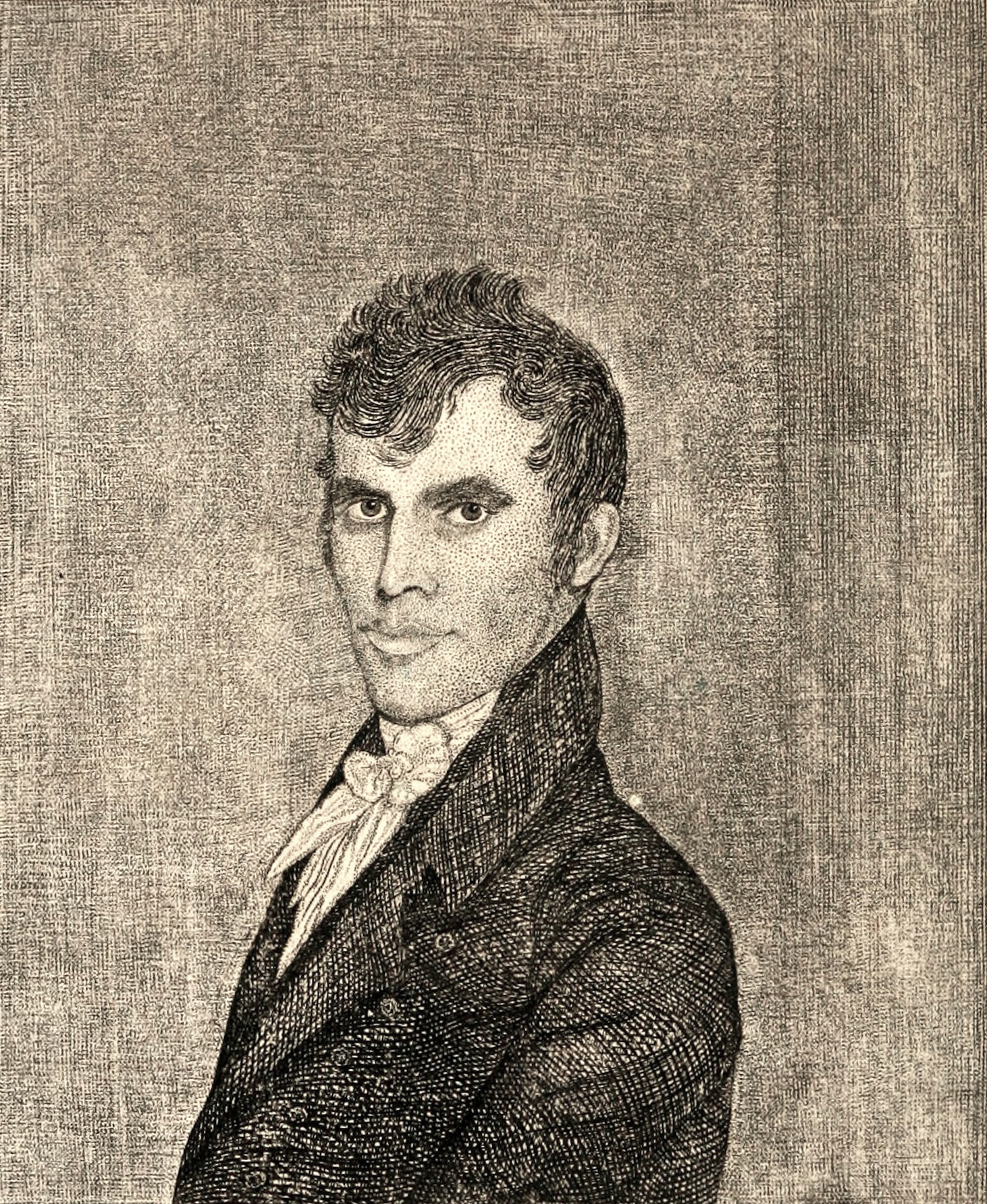
- Posthumous portrait of McChord, frontispiece of Sermons on Important Subjects (1822)

1st President of Centre College
- In office March 4, 1820 – May 26, 1820
- Succeeded by: Jeremiah Chamberlain

Personal details
- Born: March 29, 1785 Baltimore, Maryland, U.S.
- Died: May 26, 1820 (aged 35)
- Resting place: Lexington Cemetery
- Education: Transylvania University (1805); Associate Reformed Theological Seminary (1809)

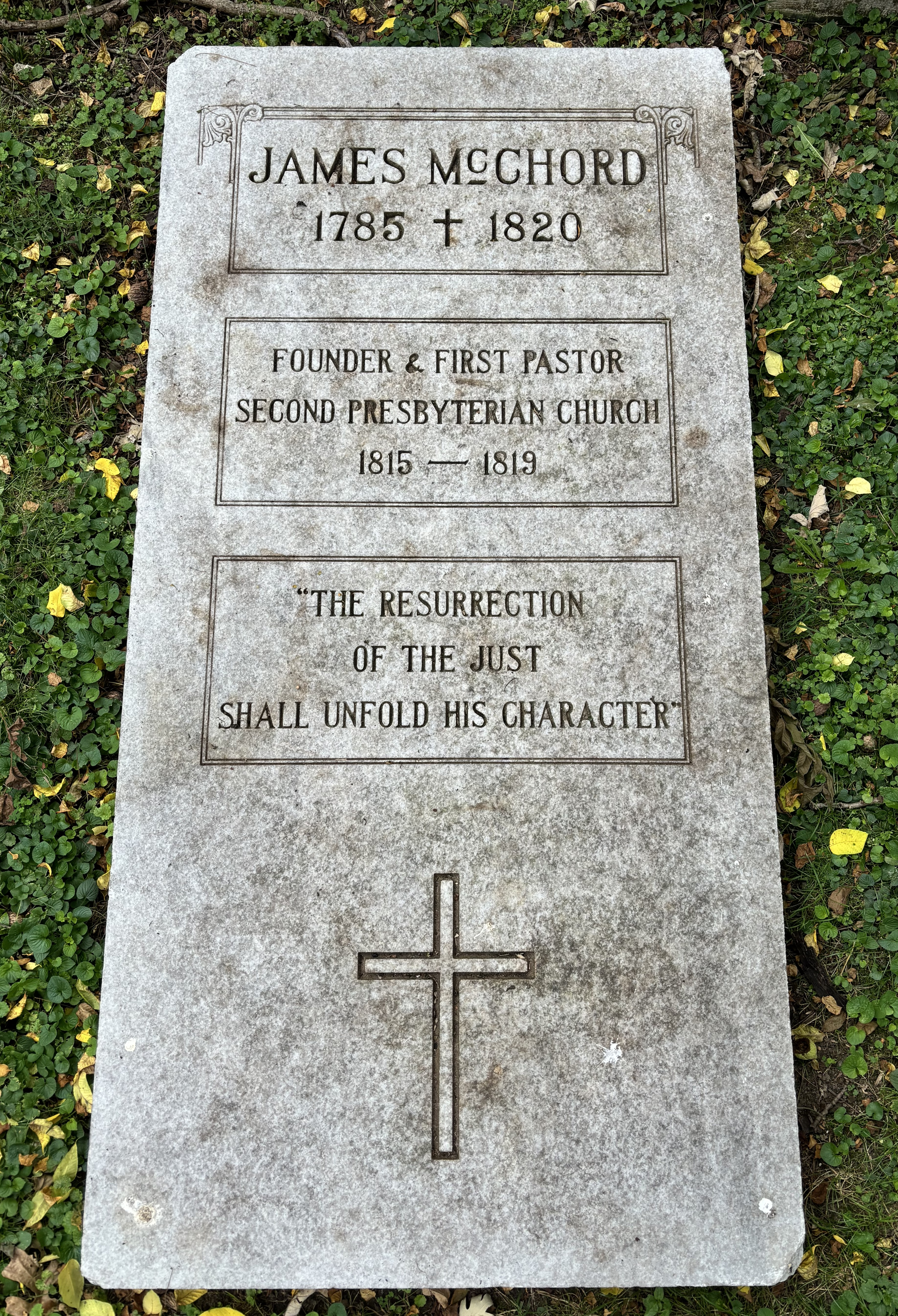
McChord's gravestone at Lexington Cemetery

James McChord or M'Chord (March 29, 1785 – May 26, 1820) was an American Presbyterian minister and educator. He was educated at Transylvania University and the Associate Reformed Theological Seminary and began his ministry in Lexington, Kentucky, in 1813. Two years later, he founded what would later become Lexington's Second Presbyterian Church and served as its pastor until 1819. He taught and was a member of the Board of Trustees at Transylvania from 1813 to 1819, and he was elected to serve as the first president of Centre College in Danville, Kentucky, in March 1820 but died nearly three months later before officially assuming the position.

== Early life and education ==
McChord was born in Baltimore on March 29, 1785, to Isabella and John McChord. He was christened on April 13, 1785. When he was five, he moved with his family to Lexington, Kentucky, where he then attended Lexington Academy. He stayed in Lexington for college, as he attended Transylvania University. He graduated in 1805 and then began to study law under Henry Clay, but soon changed course and began studying for the ministry. McChord relocated to New York City to attend the Associate Reformed Theological Seminary, where he studied under John M. Mason. He was noted as having been a "favorite pupil" of Mason's, and he graduated with a Doctor of Divinity degree as valedictorian of the class of 1809.

== Career ==
Upon his graduation from seminary in 1809, McChord became licensed to preach. He moved back to Kentucky the following month, and he was ordained in 1811. He began preaching sermons in 1813, in the home of the minister Dr. T. S. Bell, though this practice eventually ceased because it was against the laws of the Associate Reformed Presbyterian Church. Originally resolving to leave Lexington as a result, his congregation rallied to keep this from happening. McChord was invited to give a sermon to the Kentucky General Assembly on January 12, 1815, which was entitled "National Safety". On July 30, 1815, McChord dedicated a new church, the Market Street Church, with himself as pastor and with a congregation of fifteen. The name changed to the Market Street Presbyterian Church in 1818 when McChord resigned from the Associate Reformed Presbytery in favor of the West Lexington Presbytery. McChord served as pastor of the church full-time until 1819.

In addition to the ministry, McChord was also heavily involved in education. In 1813, he joined the faculty at his alma mater, Transylvania University, as a part-time professor of astronomy, and he was elected to the school's Board of Trustees the following year. He left Transylvania in 1819 to accept a position as principal of the Bourbon Academy in Paris, Kentucky. On March 4, 1820, he was elected by the Board of Trustees to serve as the first president of Centre College, which had been founded in Danville, Kentucky, in January 1819. During this same board meeting, McChord was elected professor of mathematics, which carried an annual salary of US$1,200 (equivalent to $27,643 in 2025).

== Death and legacy ==
Before he was able to formally assume the presidency, McChord died suddenly on May 26, 1820. He was buried in a vault in front of the pulpit of his church in Lexington. In 1823, the church changed its name to McChord Presbyterian Church (also referred to as McChord's Presbyterian Church) in his honor, but the name was changed again in 1828 to Second Presbyterian Church (a name it still retains), as some felt it was improper to name a church after an individual. His grave remained at the church until 1924, when he was interred in Lexington Cemetery.

During his lifetime, McChord published two volumes of sermons and was considered a very popular and skilled preacher.

Samuel Finley was appointed president pro tempore in 1822, filling the vacancy created by McChord's death, and Jeremiah Chamberlain was elected president on a permanent basis in December of that year.
