= Isaac Ross (planter) =

American planter

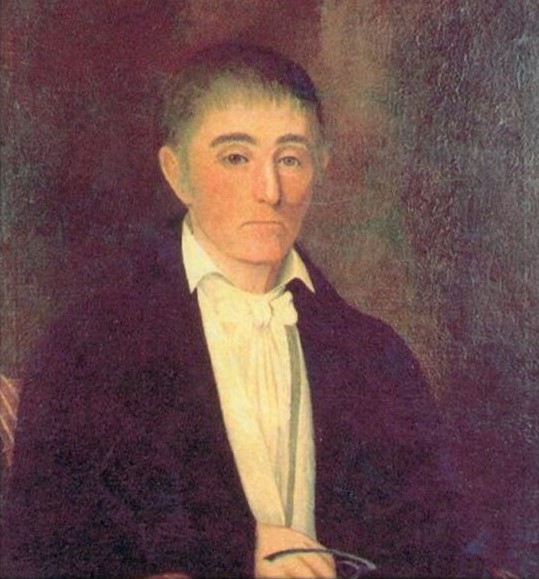
- Born: January 18, 1760; Orangeburg County, South Carolina
- Died: January 19, 1836 (aged 76); Jefferson County, Mississippi
- Resting place: Prospect Hill Plantation, Jefferson County, Mississippi
- Occupation: Planter
- Title: Captain
- Spouse: Jane (Allison) Ross
- Children: Margaret Allison Ross Reed; Martha B. Ross; Jane Brown Ross Wade; Isaac Ross; Arthur Alison
- Parent(s): Isaac Ross; Jean Brown Ross
- Relatives: Thomas Buck Reed (son-in-law); Isaac Ross Wade (grandson); Walter Ross Wade (grandson)

Isaac Ross (January 18, 1760 – January 19, 1836) was an American Revolutionary War veteran and planter from South Carolina who developed Prospect Hill Plantation in Jefferson County, Mississippi, for cotton cultivation. He owned thousands of acres and nearly 160 slaves by 1820.

In 1830 Ross was among the major donors and founders of Oakland College, a Presbyterian-affiliated school for young men near Rodney, Mississippi, which operated from 1830 to 1870. After it failed, its campus was sold to the state and used to start Alcorn College, the first land-grant university for Blacks in the United States.

Influenced by war ideals and the American Colonization Society, Ross was among the founders of the Mississippi Colonization Society. Its goal was to repatriate (or transport) freed slaves and free people of color to Africa in order to get them out of the South, where planters believed they threatened slave societies. In 1835 Ross wrote a will to free his nearly 200 African-American slaves. It ordered the sale of his plantation to generate revenue to fund the transport of the freed slaves to Mississippi-in-Africa, the state's colony in West Africa that eventually became part of Liberia. The Mississippi Colonization Society had purchased the land, and in 1847 it became part of the Commonwealth of Liberia.

== Biography ==
=== Early life ===
Isaac Ross was born on January 18, 1760, in North Carolina. His family moved when he was young to Orangeburg County, South Carolina. He was named after his father, Isaac Ross. His mother was Jean Ross, née Brown (1722–1766).

=== Career ===
In the American Revolutionary War of 1775–1783, Ross rose to the rank of Captain of the Second Dragoons under the leadership of General Thomas Sumter (1734–1832).

In 1808, together with his brother Thomas, Ross moved from South Carolina to the Mississippi Territory. He purchased what he developed as the Prospect Hill Plantation near Port Gibson, Jefferson County. By 1818, after Mississippi became a state, he owned 3,881 acres of land and 133 slaves; 158 slaves in 1820; and 4,240 acres of land and 113 slaves in 1830. Shortly before his death, Ross owned around 5,000 acres of land, 160 slaves, and had an estimated wealth of US$100,000.

In 1830, Ross was one of the financial supporters of Oakland College, near Rodney, Mississippi, a Presbyterian college whose president was minister Jeremiah Chamberlain.

In the 1830s, together with Chamberlain and three other planters, Edward McGehee, Stephen Duncan, and John Ker, Ross co-founded the Mississippi Colonization Society. Like the American Colonization Society, its goal was to relocate free blacks and newly freed slaves to the American colony of Liberia in West Africa in order to remove them from American society, particularly from the slave societies of the South. The organization was focused on slaves freed in Mississippi, where slaves outnumbered whites by a ratio of three-to-one. These major slaveholders believed that free blacks threatened the stability of American society, and that transporting freed slaves to Africa might be a long-term solution.

=== Personal life ===
Ross married Jane Allison (1762–1829). They had two sons and three daughters:

- Margaret Allison Ross Reed (1787–1838). Her second husband was Thomas Buck Reed (1787–1829), who served as United States Senator from Mississippi from January 28, 1826, to March 4, 1827, and again from March 4, 1829, to November 26, 1829.
- Martha B. Ross (1793–1818).
- Jane Brown Ross Wade (1786–1851). Mother of Issac Ross Wade.
- Isaac Ross (1796–1852) married Sarah Elliot, sister of William St. John Elliot
- Arthur Alison Ross (1801–1834). He married Octavia Van Dorn, sister of Earl Van Dorn (1820–1863), an officer who served as a general in the Confederate States Army during the American Civil War of 1861–1865. Widowed when her husband Alison died, in 1837 Octavia married Dr Vans Murray Sulivane (1810–1840); they had a son, Clement Sullivane (1838–1920), who served in the Confederate States Army during the Civil War. He was later elected as a member of the Maryland Senate.

Ross was widowed in 1829. Around the same period that he lost his wife, their daughter and a son-in-law, and two Ross sons also died.

=== Death and legacy ===
Ross died on January 19, 1836, in Jefferson County, Mississippi. He was buried in the cemetery at Prospect Hill Plantation. It later became known as the Wade Family Cemetery after his grandson Isaac Ross Wade reacquired the plantation in the 1850s, building a new mansion and living on the grounds.

Ross freed his slaves in his will, ordering the sale of his plantation to raise funds in order to pay for their transport to Liberia and provide them with a stake to get necessary supplies for their new lives. The will stipulated that those slaves who chose not to emigrate to Africa should be sold to the highest bidder, with the proceeds invested to go to the American Colonization Society to build a new university in Liberia for the colonists and support it for 100 years. Ross added the caveat that slave families could not be separated. An elaborate white marble monument, based on the Choragic Monument of Lysicrates, to Isaac Ross stands at his gravesite in the cemetery at Prospect Hill Plantation.

Ross and other supporters of such colonization referred to freed slaves being "repatriated" to Africa, but by this time, most slaves were overwhelmingly American born, and had been for generations. In the North most free blacks did not want to leave the United States but to improve their treatment and gain civil rights here. They expressed considerable opposition to the program of the American Colonization Society, but thousands of free blacks did migrate as pioneers to Liberia.

Of Ross' 160 registered slaves at Prospect Hill Plantation, 123 chose to be freed and emigrate to Africa. (Five were prohibited from leaving.) Other freed slaves were added from other plantations, making a group of nearly 300. Ross' grandson Isaac Ross Wade contested the will for nearly a decade, as the estate was used to fund the migration.

In 1842 Mississippi passed a law prohibiting the manumission of slaves by will, and prohibiting removal of slaves from the state for the purpose of manumission. But perhaps legislators had not envisioned 'repatriation' for the purpose of manumission, as the Ross will was upheld in 1845 by the Supreme Court of Mississippi. There were additional technicalities that delayed the freedmen's departure. During this period, they worked under the authority of Isaac Ross Wade at Prospect Hill Plantation, with the stipulation that they were technically free and would be paid for their time.

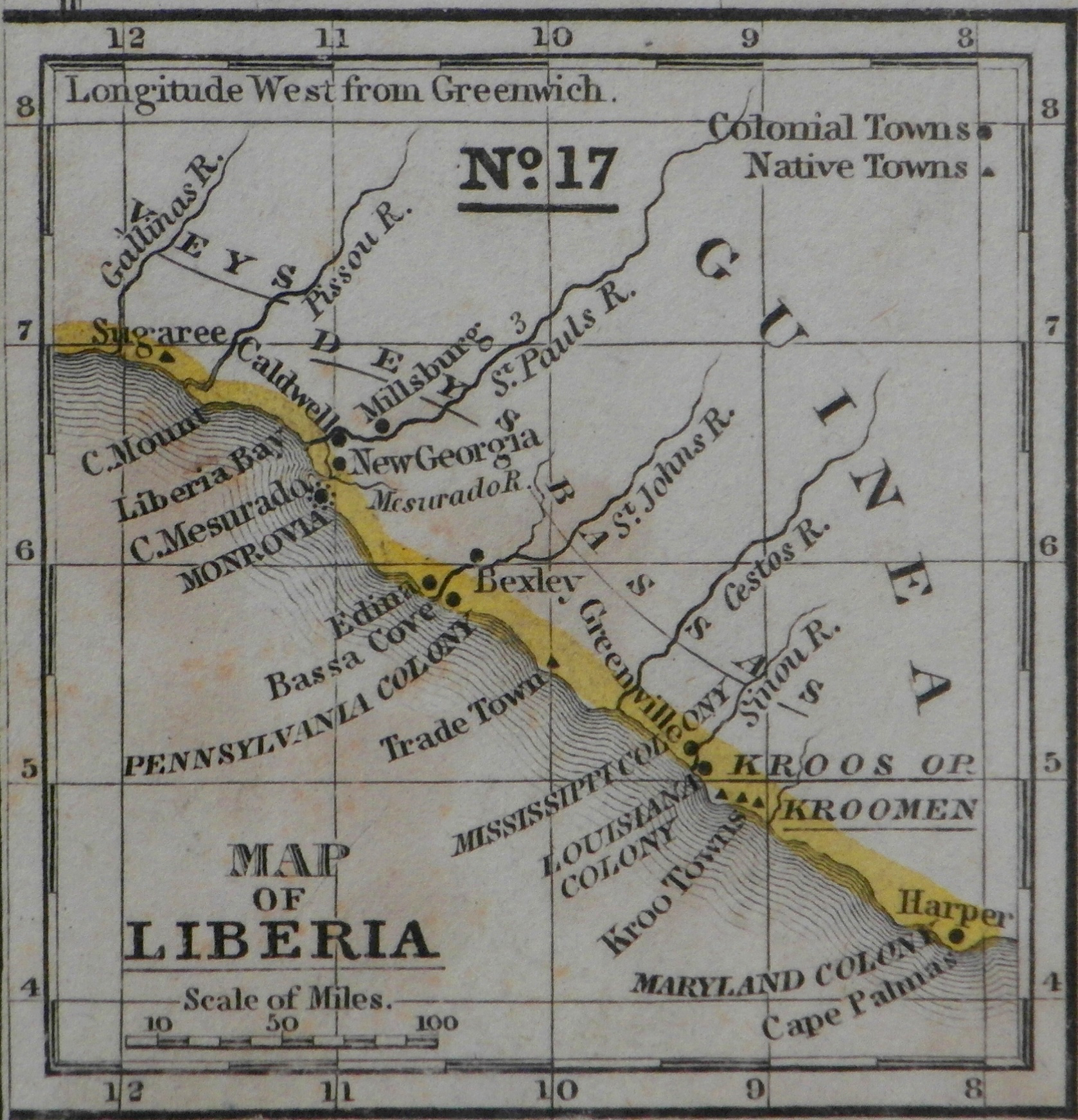
Map of Liberia in the 1830s, where the Mississippi and other state-sponsored colonies are identified.

Finally traveling from Natchez, Mississippi by ship, the Prospect Hill freedmen reached Liberia in two groups in 1848. They settled in what came to be known as Mississippi-in-Africa, on land purchased by the Mississippi Colonization Society. Most of them could read and write, and were likely among the elite household staff and artisans among slaves.

Many corresponded with Wade and members of his family, as well as representatives of the MCS, in an attempt to gain supplies they desperately needed. They also sought to have the Wade family pay them what they were owed for three years' work - an estimated $100,000. They were met mostly with silence; in one letter the Wade family told them their board and court expenses had been charged to the money they were owed, and that in fact they were in debt to the family. The letters from the African Americans reported the high fatalities their group suffered, with many dying in the first year or so of "African fever." Neither the Wade family nor the ACS ever followed through on their obligations to the settlers; no university in Liberia was endowed or established from Ross' funds.

In Mississippi in Africa: The Saga of the Slaves of Prospect Hill Plantation and Their Legacy in Liberia Today (revised edition, 2010), author Alan Huffman argues that tensions introduced by the development of this colony (and the larger influence of Americo-Liberians in the country) created longstanding resentments among the indigenous tribesmen. In addition, the Americo-Liberians repressed the native peoples and assumed their own superiority, in a colonial manner. They created a society with inequities that Huffman believes strongly contributed to the First Liberian Civil War of 1989-1996 more than a century later, and to the Second Liberian Civil War of 1999–2003. Because the Americo-Liberians dominated the country politically and economically into the 20th century, suppressing the native tribes, there was great resentment against them among the indigenous peoples. The Americo-Liberians treated the native tribes as inferior to them, much as they had been treated by whites in the United States.
