= Alan Huffman =

Alan Huffman is an American author and journalist. He is the author of five nonfiction books, three of which deal with history related to the American South. He is notable as an opposition researcher.

== Life and work ==
Huffman is from Bolton, Mississippi.

He moved the Holly Grove Plantation House from near Port Gibson, Mississippi to Bolton, Mississippi in 1990. The home is listed on the National Register of Historic Places.

Ten Point: Deer Camp in the Mississippi Delta, (1997) was his first book. It is a photo-essay, exploring decades of the Issaquena County wilderness in the Mississippi Delta. Huffman wrote text as a setting for photographs by his grandmother Florence Huffman. She had frequently accompanied her husband and friends to the hunting camp, and her photos spanned the period of 1927 to 1962. After that, developers and the US Army Corps of Engineers took over the area. This territory was the setting for William Faulkner's short story "The Bear".

Mississippi in Africa: The Saga of the Slaves of Prospect Hill Plantation and Their Legacy in Liberia (2004) explores two related but different worlds of African Americans in the antebellum period. It reveals the settlement of Mississippi-in-Africa, in present-day Sinoe County, Liberia, as well as the slave world at Prospect Hill Plantation, which they left behind. This colony was initiated in the 1830s by the Mississippi chapter of the American Colonization Society, in order to relocate freed slaves out of the state. It was later incorporated into what became the independent nation of Liberia.

Sultana: Surviving the Civil War, Prison, and the Worst Maritime Disaster in American History (2009) follows four young Union soldiers through the American Civil War, including their capture and imprisonment. It culminates with their surviving the explosion and sinking of the riverboat Sultana, in which 1700 people died; it was the worst maritime disaster in American history.

We're with Nobody: Two Insiders Reveal the Dark Side of American Politics (2012), co-authored with Michael Rejebian, describes the authors' work for 18 years as opposition researchers. During this period they studied candidates ranging from presidential appointments and congressional representatives, down to people running for the local school board. They reveal an inside look at a little-understood aspect of American politics and show that they are trying to bring factual material to public light so that voters have information on candidates.

Here I Am: The Story of Tim Hetherington, War Photographer (Grove Press, 2013), is a biography of photojournalist Tim Hetherington. He covered conflicts in the African nations of Liberia, Sierra Leone, Darfur, Nigeria, and Libya, as well as Afghanistan. Huffman describes Hetherington as having an artistic eye and focused on revealing the lives of his subjects, setting him apart from other conflict photographers. In addition, he was credited with Sebastian Junger) as co-director of the documentary film Restrepo, about an American base in Afghanistan, which was nominated for an Academy Award. Hetherington was killed in Libya, alongside photographer Chris Hondros, on April 20, 2011, while covering that nation's revolution.
