= Edward McGehee =

Mississippi judge and planter (1786–1880)

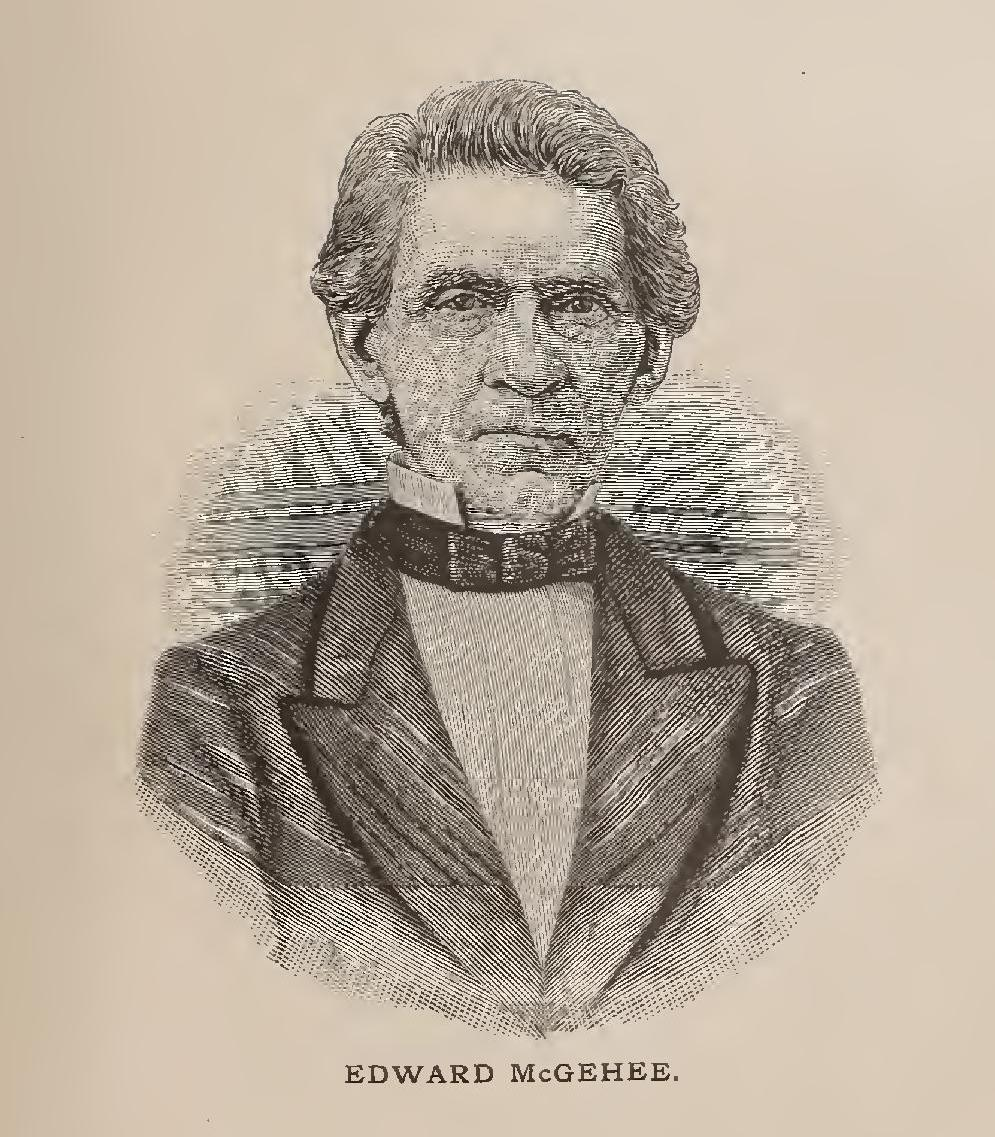
- Born: November 8, 1786
- Died: October 1, 1880 (aged 93); Woodville, Mississippi
- Resting place: Bowling Green Cemetery, Woodville, Mississippi
- Occupation: Planter
- Title: Judge
- Spouse: Mary (Burruss) McGehee
- Children: Charles Goodrich McGehee; Francis William McGehee; John Burruss McGehee; Harriett Lucinda McGehee; Augusta Eugenia McGehee
- Parent(s): Micajah McGehee; Ann (Scott) McGehee
- Relatives: Stark Young (nephew)

Edward McGehee (November 8, 1786 – October 1, 1880) was an American judge and major planter in Wilkinson County, Mississippi. He owned nearly 1,000 slaves to work his thousands of acres of cotton land at his Bowling Green Plantation.

In the 1830s, McGehee was among a group of major planters who founded the Mississippi Colonization Society to transport free people of color from the state to West Africa. They intended to remove what they considered the destabilizing threat of free people of color in a slave society. In 1838, they created a settlement known as Mississippi-in-Africa, which became part of the Commonwealth of Liberia in 1841.

== Biography ==
=== Early life ===
Edward McGehee was born on November 8, 1786. His father was Micajah McGehee and his mother, Ann (Scott) McGehee.

=== Career ===
After becoming established as an attorney, McGehee was appointed as a state judge in Mississippi. A wealthy cotton planter, he owned the Bowling Green Plantation near Woodville in Wilkinson County, Mississippi. The plantation spread across several thousand acres; McGehee held nearly 1,000 slaves to work this vast area.

Additionally, McGehee owned a textile factory on his plantation, with about 100 slaves working in it. In 1831, he purchased the West Feliciana Rail Road Company in Louisiana.

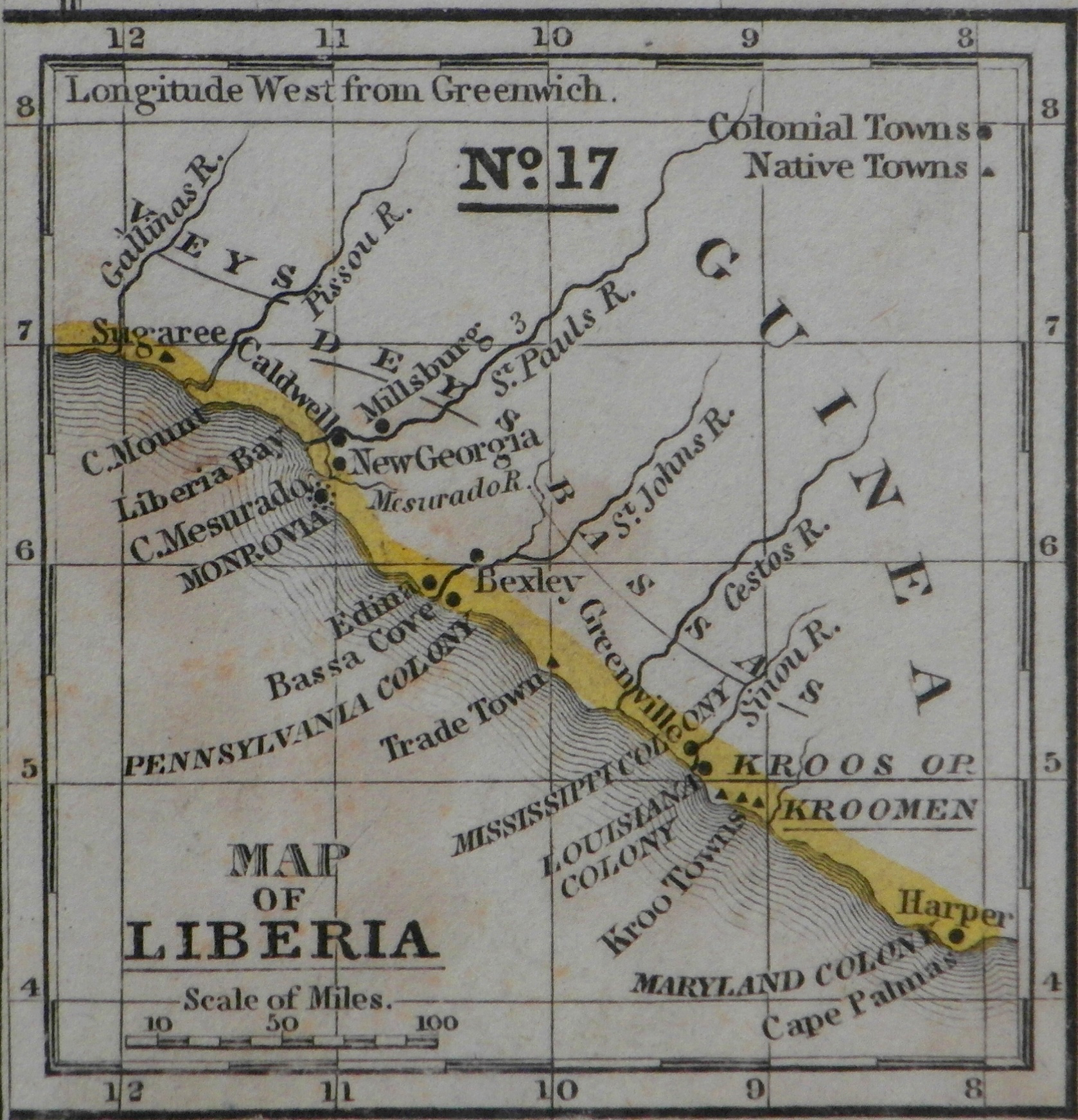
Map of Liberia in the 1830s, where the Mississippi colony and other state-sponsored colonies are identified.

As early as the 1830s, together with other planters Isaac Ross (1760–1838), Stephen Duncan (1787–1867), John Ker (1789–1850), and educator/minister Jeremiah Chamberlain (1794–1851), McGehee co-founded the Mississippi Colonization Society, whose goal was to send freedmen and free people of color to Liberia in West Africa. The organization was modeled after the American Colonization Society, but it focused on freedmen from Mississippi, where slaves outnumbered whites by a three-to-one ratio.

During the American Civil War of 1861–1865, McGehee supported the Union. However, he also sold clothes made in his textile factory to the Confederate States Army. The mansion at his Bowling Green Plantation was burned down by United States Colored Troops in 1864. His wife wrote about the incident in Army & Navy Herald, a Confederate newspaper.

=== Personal life ===
He married Mary Hines Burruss. They had three sons and two daughters:

- Charles Goodrich McGehee (1823–1903)
- Francis William McGehee (1831–1843)
- John Burruss McGehee (1836–1913)
- Harriett Lucinda McGehee (1844–1851)
- Augusta Eugenia McGehee (1854–1882)

=== Death ===
McGehee died on October 1, 1880, at his plantation in Woodville, Mississippi.

== Legacy ==
- Author Stark Young (1881–1963) was his nephew. He wrote about the fire that destroyed the plantation house in his 1934 novel So Red the Rose. He also referred to it symbolically in his 1951 novel The Pavilion.
- The former Edward McGehee Church of the Methodist Episcopal Church, built between 1851 and 1853 and located at the intersection of Lafayette, Girod and Baronne streets in New Orleans, Louisiana, was named in his honor. It was purchased by the Freemasons in 1906 and renamed as the Scottish Rite Cathedral.
- The former Edward McGehee College of Girls in Mississippi was named in his honor; author Henry Walter Featherstun (1849–1932) served as its President.
