= John Ker (planter) =

American politician

- Born: June 27, 1789
- Died: January 4, 1850 (aged 60)
- Education: University of Pennsylvania School of Medicine
- Occupations: Surgeon, planter, politician
- Title: Doctor
- Board member of: American Colonization Society
- Spouse: Mary (Baker) Ker
- Children: 6
- Parent(s): David Ker; Mary Ker
- Relatives: Joshua Baker (brother-in-law)

John Ker (1789–1850) was an American surgeon, planter, and politician in Louisiana. Together with several major Mississippi planters, in the 1830s Ker co-founded the Mississippi Colonization Society, promoting the removal of free people of color to a colony in West Africa (which later became part of Liberia). The society modeled itself after the American Colonization Society, the national organization for which Ker later served as a vice president.

Born in North Carolina, where his father was the first president of the new state university, Ker moved with his family as a youth to Mississippi after 1817, when his father was appointed to the state supreme court. He went to medical school in Philadelphia, Pennsylvania and returned to the South. A surgeon in the War of 1812 and Creek War, Ker was also a slaveowner and owned a cotton plantation in Louisiana. As a planter, he likewise served in the Louisiana state house.

== Early life ==
John Ker was born on June 27, 1789 in Chapel Hill, North Carolina. His father, David Ker (1758–1805), born in Downpatrick, Northern Ireland and of Scottish ancestry, immigrated with his wife Mary to the United States in the 1780s. He served as the first President of the University of North Carolina at Chapel Hill, which was chartered in 1789 and opened for students in 1795.

The family moved to Mississippi about 1817, the year it became a state. President Thomas Jefferson (1743–1826) appointed Ker's father to the Supreme Court of Mississippi.

John Ker had been educated privately, as was common among the southern upper class. He went North to medical school, earning a Doctor of Medicine degree from the Medical School at the University of Pennsylvania in Philadelphia, Pennsylvania in 1822.

== Career ==
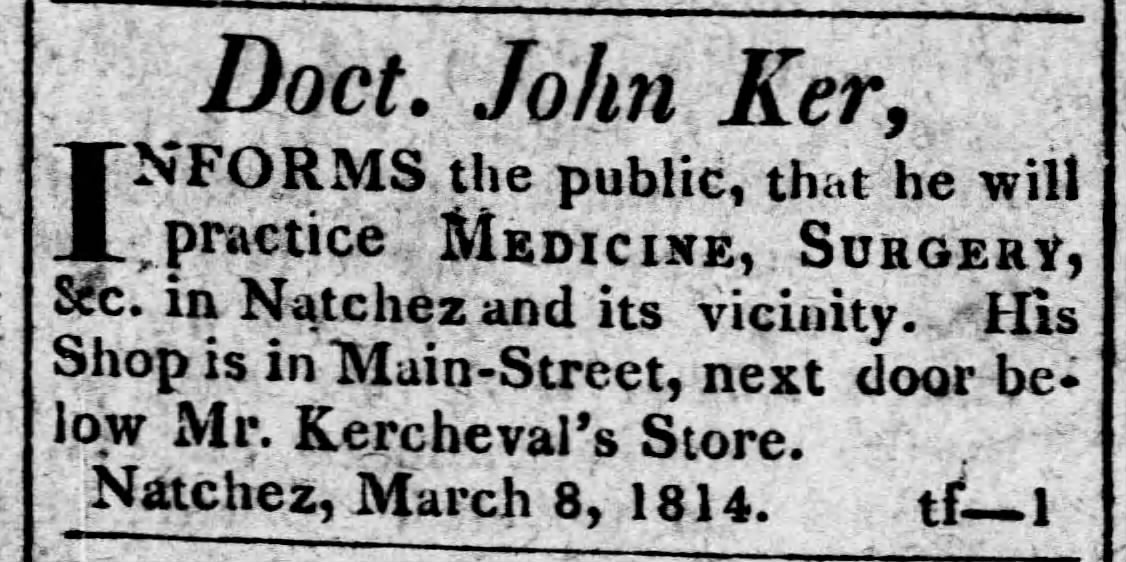
"Doct. John Ker" Mississippi Free Trader, March 16, 1814

Ker worked as a medical doctor. He served as a surgeon for the US Army in the War of 1812 and the Creek War of 1813–1814.

Ker also became a planter, owning the Good Hope Plantation in Concordia Parish, Louisiana, which produced cotton as a commodity crop, based on slave labor. He was a patron of Oakland College, near Rodney, Mississippi, a college founded by Rev. Jeremiah Chamberlain (1794–1851) that closed during the American Civil War.

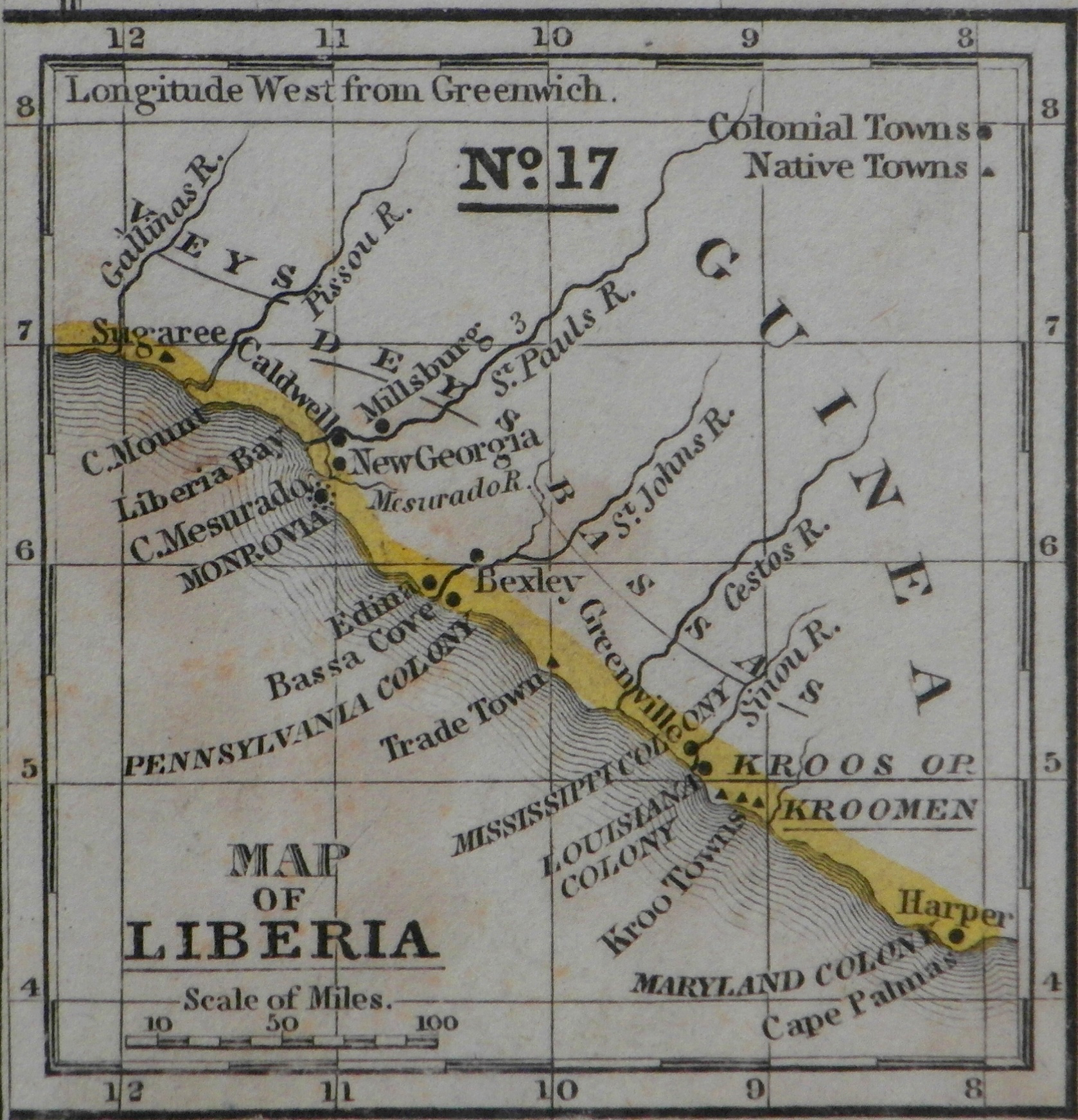
Map of Liberia in the 1830s, where the Mississippi colony and other state-sponsored colonies are identified.

In the 1830s, Ker was elected and served in the Louisiana State Senate. That same decade, together with major slave owners Isaac Ross (1760–1838), Edward McGehee (1786–1880), Stephen Duncan (1787–1867), and educator Chamberlain, all from Mississippi, he co-founded the Mississippi Colonization Society. Its goal was to send free people of color to a colony run by the society called Mississippi-in-Africa in order to remove them from the southern slave society. Ker served as a vice-president of the society. The organization was modeled after the American Colonization Society and focused on free people of color in Mississippi and later Louisiana, both of which had large enslaved populations but vastly different free populations of color. The Mississippi-in-Africa colony ultimately merged into the Commonwealth of Liberia in 1841.

Additionally, Ker later served as one of the vice presidents of the American Colonization Society.

He died in Good Hope, Louisiana, and was buried in Linden Cemetery in Adams County, Mississippi.

== Personal life ==
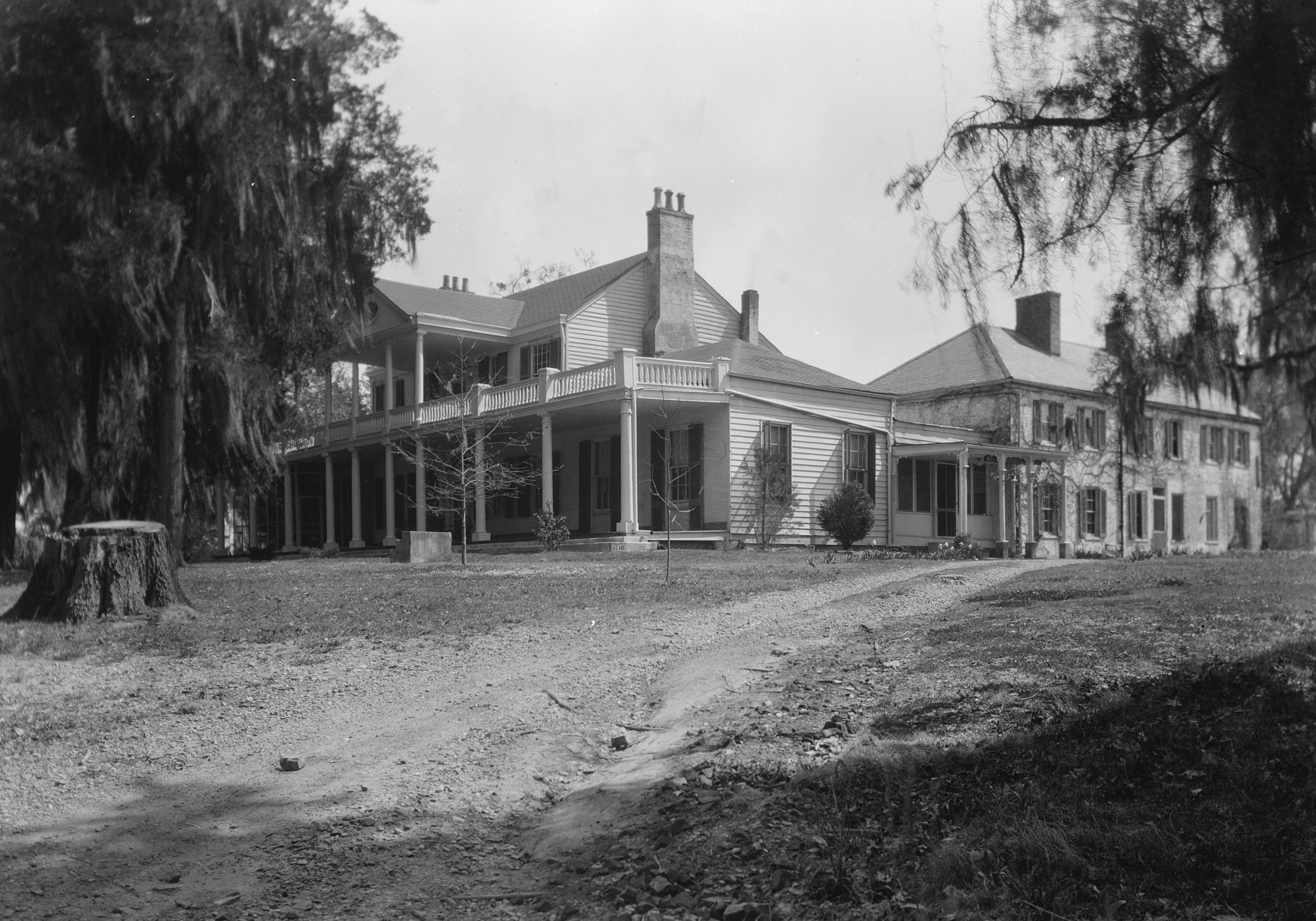
Linden in Natchez, Mississippi.

He married Mary Kenard Baker (1803–1862), the daughter of Joshua Baker, who served on the Legislative Council of Mississippi Territory. She was born in Kentucky. They had four sons and two daughters:

- David Ker (1825–1884).
- Sarah Evelina Ker (1826–1868). She married Richard E. Butler, son of Thomas Butler and Mary Ellis.
- John Ker (1826–1870).
- Lewis Ker (1831–1894).
- Mary Susan Ker (1838–1923).
- William H. Ker (1841–1902).

Ker and his family summered at Linden, a mansion on the bluffs above the river in Natchez, Mississippi. It is now listed on the National Register of Historic Places. The property was formerly owned by Thomas Buck Reed (1787–1829), a United States Senator from Mississippi and son-in-law of Isaac Ross, whom Ker knew through the Mississippi Colonization Society.

Ker was a Presbyterian, the Protestant church strongly associated with Scotland and its emigrants.
