= Walter Ross Wade =

American physician

- Born: 1810; South Carolina
- Died: 1862 (aged 51–52); Jefferson County, Mississippi
- Occupations: Medical doctor, planter
- Spouses: Martha Taylor Wade; Mabella Jane Duncan Chamberlain
- Children: 4
- Parent(s): Daniel Wade; Jean Brown Ross
- Relatives: Isaac Ross (grandfather)

Walter Ross Wade (1810–1862) was an American medical doctor and planter in the Antebellum South. He owned the Rosswood Plantation, a cotton plantation in Jefferson County, Mississippi. His diary was published posthumously.

== Biography ==
=== Early life ===
Walter Ross Wade was born in 1810 in South Carolina. His father was Daniel Wade and his mother, Jean Brown Ross. His maternal grandfather was Isaac Ross, the first owner of the Prospect Hill Plantation.

=== Career ===
He worked as a medical doctor, treating patients in the Natchez District. He kept a diary of his patient visits and other activities.

He purchased the Rosswood Plantation, a 1,250-acre cotton plantation in Jefferson County, Mississippi. He owned more than 100 African slaves who picked cotton in the fields. In 1857, he hired architect David Schroeder to design the Greek Revival mansion. It was built as a gift for his second wife. The Wades entertained guests regularly and went fox-hunting on the grounds. During the American Civil War of 1861–1865, they invited the Confederate States Army to use the mansion as a Confederate hospital.

=== Personal life ===
He married a cousin, Martha Taylor Wade. They had two children. After she died, he married Mabella Jane Duncan Chamberlain, and they also had two children.

=== Death ===
He died in 1862.

== Legacy ==
His diary was published posthumously. In 2003, it was recorded as an audio book on a CD.
