= Stephen Duncan =

American planter and banker

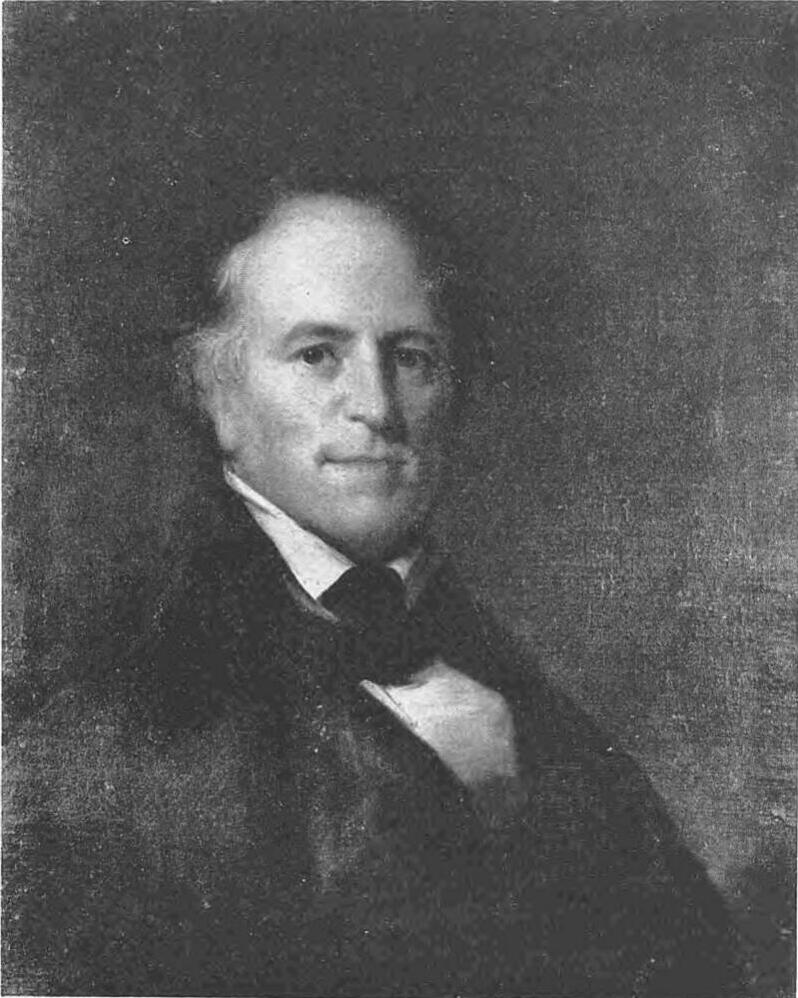
- portrait by Joseph H. Bush
- Born: March 4, 1787; Carlisle, Pennsylvania, U.S.
- Died: January 29, 1867 (aged 79); New York, New York, U.S.
- Resting place: Laurel Hill Cemetery, Philadelphia, Pennsylvania, U.S.
- Education: Dickinson College
- Occupations: Plantation owner, banker
- Known for: Wealthiest cotton planter in the South prior to the American Civil War; second largest slave owner in the country
- Spouse(s): Margaret Ellis Catherine Bingaman (m. 1819)
- Children: (with Margaret): John Ellis Duncan, Sarah Jane Duncan (with Catherine): Stephen Duncan Jr., Charlotte N. Duncan, M. L. Duncan, Henry P. Duncan

Stephen Duncan (March 4, 1787 – January 29, 1867) was an American planter and banker in Mississippi. He was born and studied medicine in Pennsylvania, but moved to Natchez District, Mississippi Territory in 1808 and became the wealthiest cotton planter and the second-largest slave owner in the United States with over 2,200 slaves. He owned 15 cotton and sugar plantations, served as President of the Bank of Mississippi, and held major investments in railroads and lumber.

In the 1830s, Duncan was one of the co-founders of the Mississippi Colonization Society and helped purchase land in West Africa, known as Mississippi-in-Africa, to create a colony for relocation of free people of color from the state.

He was a Southern Unionist during the American Civil War and declined to offer assistance to the Confederate cause. He was ostracized in Mississippi due to his pro-Unionist stance and moved from Natchez to New York City in 1863.

== Early life and education ==
Stephen Duncan was born on March 4, 1787, in Carlisle, Pennsylvania to John Duncan and Sarah Postlethwaite. His family were early settlers to the Cumberland Valley in Pennsylvania and his grandfather received a land grant from King George III of Great Britain.

In 1793, Duncan's father was killed in a duel when Stephen was only six years old. His mother remarried Ephraim Blaine, ancestor of James G. Blaine, in 1797.

Duncan was related to the Fighting Butlers and Samuel Postlethwaite (his uncle), early and influential Natchez nabobs.

He received a medical degree from Dickinson College in 1805. After graduation, he moved to Philadelphia and lived with his mother and sisters while apprenticing as a physician under Benjamin Rush. Duncan's stepfather Blaine died in 1804; Sarah Postlethwaite Duncan Blaine lived out her days in Philadelphia (surviving until 1850).

== Pre Civil-War career ==
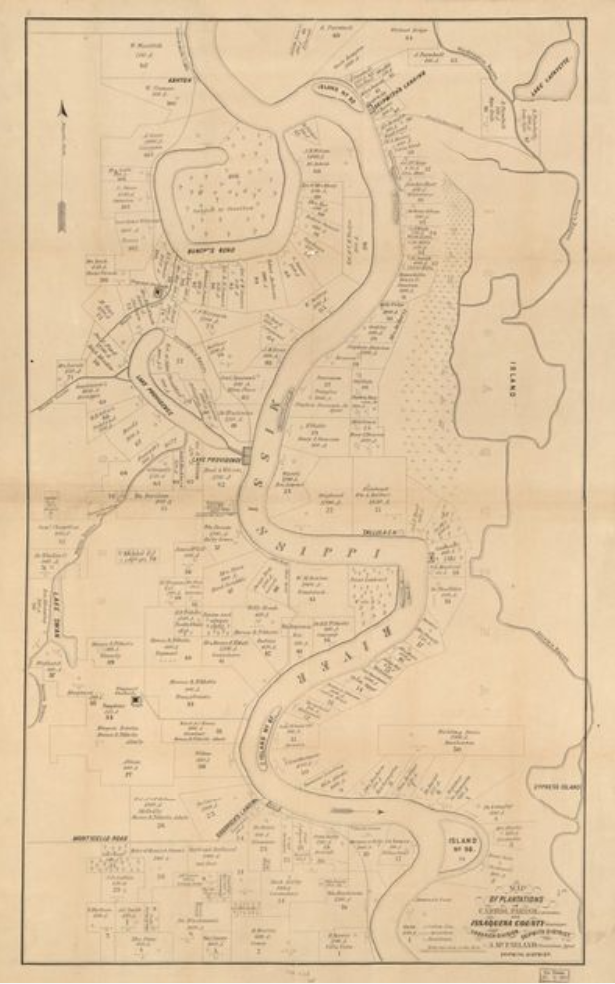
Duncan's Duncannon and Homochitto plantations can be seen in this map of plantations in Carroll Parish, Louisiana and Issaquena County Mississippi

In 1808, shortly before the War of 1812, Duncan moved as a young man to Natchez District, Mississippi Territory, a developing river town that was important for trade along the Mississippi River. In the pre-Civil War South, Natchez became a thriving city due to the booming cotton industry. In Natchez, he became a banker and planter. "Saragossa" was located just a few miles south of Natchez and was one of the early plantations he developed. Between 1820 and 1825 he acquired several Natchez-area properties from the widow of territorial governor Winthrop Sargent. In the late 1820s he began developing plantations in the Louisiana sugar parishes, having purchased land that abutted the estate of Alexander Porter. He served as the president of the Bank of Mississippi. The Bank of Mississippi charter was revoked in 1831 and Duncan became one of the founders of the Agricultural Bank of Natchez in 1833.

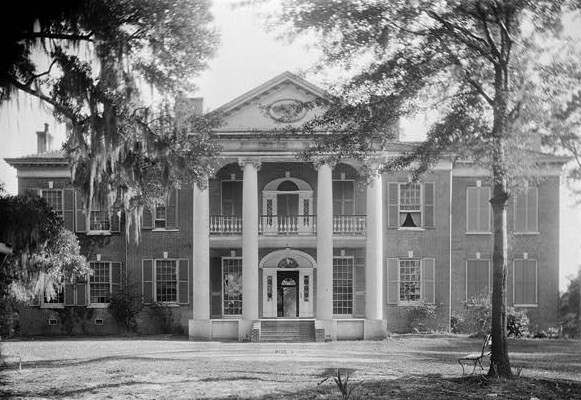
Duncan purchased the Auburn mansion in Natchez, Mississippi in 1827

Duncan purchased Auburn plantation from Lyman Harding in 1827.

Duncan owned 15 cotton and sugar plantations including L'Argent, Camperdown, Carlisle, Duncan, Duncannon, Duncansby, Ellisle, Homochitto, Middlesex, Oakley, Rescue, Reserve, Attakapas, and Saragossa. He also owned shipping, railroad and lumber businesses in Mississippi and New England. He was a partial owner of the Erie & Kalamazoo, Columbus, Pequa & Indiana, Terre Haute & Richmond and Panama railroads. Historian Dunbar Rowland reported that in 1848 there was epidemic cholera in the lower Mississippi and in "'Stack Island' reach, one of the largest planters, Dr. Duncan, of Natchez, lost over 133 hands and the entire crop on his place, where he usually made 3,000 or 4,000 bales of cotton."

Duncan sold his crops through the merchant firm Washington Jackson & Co. in New Orleans, instructing them to sell it through their subsidiary Todd, Jackson & Co. in Liverpool, England. The revenue derived from the cotton and sugar sales was sent to Charles P. Leverich & Co., his bank headquartered in New York. His plantations yielded returns of US$150,000 annually. As a result of these financial transactions, Duncan became the richest cotton planter. In the 1850s, Duncan owned more than 1,000 slaves, making him the largest resident slave holder in Mississippi. By 1860, Duncan's ownership of 858 slaves in Issaquena County made him second nationally to the estate of Joshua John Ward of South Carolina, which enslaved 1,130.

While Duncan enjoyed the Mississippi weather during the winter months, he spent most summers away from Natchez and escaped the heat with his family to Philadelphia, Saratoga Springs, New York or Newport, Rhode Island. He loaned money to Henry Clay "during periods of personal embarrassment and [Clay] discovered in his late years that both interest and principal were canceled."

== Colonization efforts ==
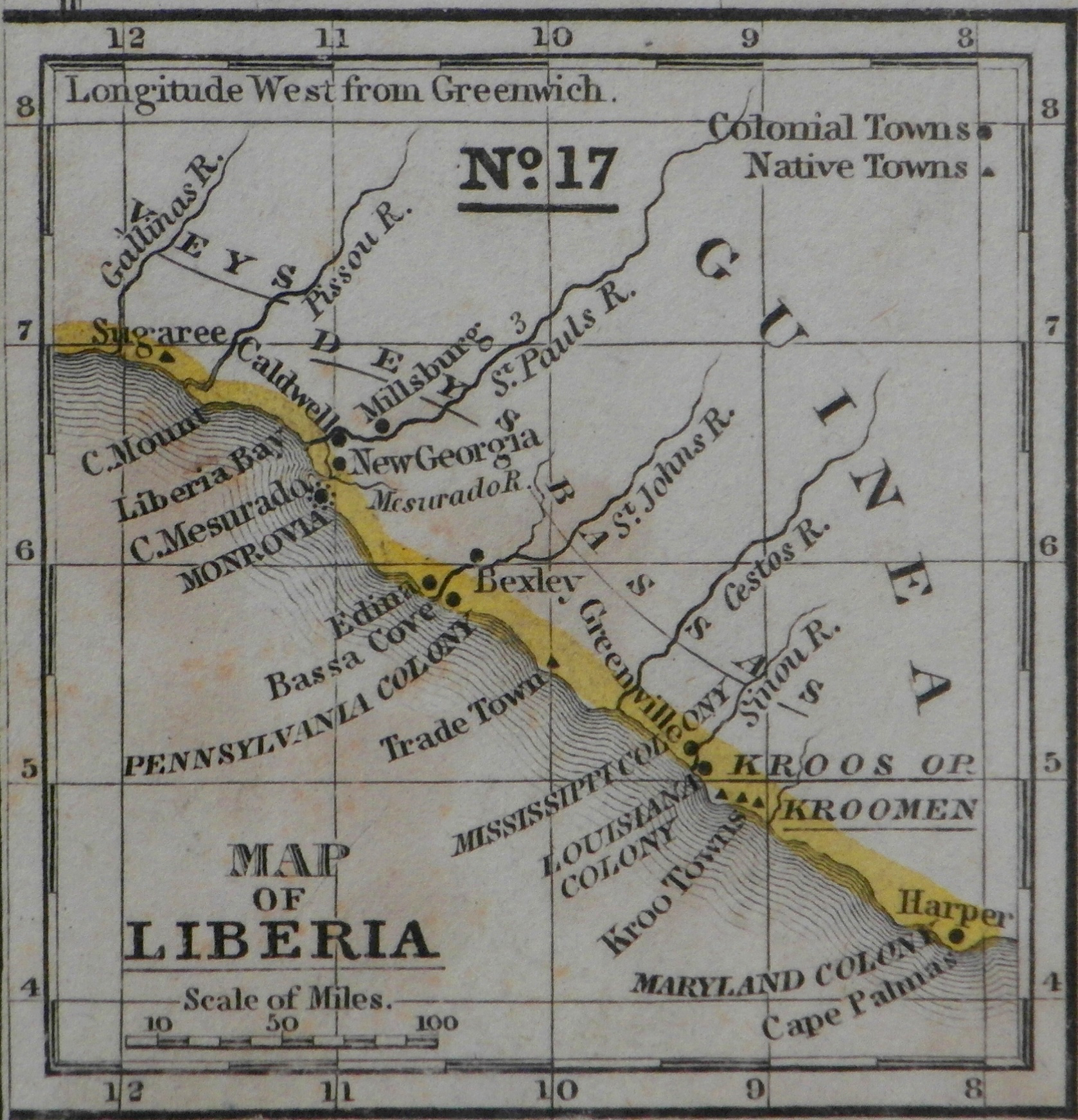
Map of Liberia in the 1830s, where the Mississippi colony and other state-sponsored colonies are identified.

Duncan became a backer of the American Colonization Society. In the 1830s, he co-founded the Mississippi Colonization Society along with major slave owners Isaac Ross, Edward McGehee, John Ker, and educator Jeremiah Chamberlain, president of Oakland College. Their goal was to relocate free blacks and newly freed slaves to the developing colony of Mississippi-in-Africa in West Africa. The organization was modeled after the American Colonization Society, but it focused on freedmen from Mississippi. They bought a portion of land for the colony. Free blacks were thought to threaten the stability of slave societies, and Mississippi's population had a majority of slaves, outnumbering whites by a three-to-one ratio. The Mississippi colony eventually became part of Liberia.

== American Civil War and postbellum career ==
During the Civil War, Duncan remained a steadfast Unionist. Along with his in-laws and close allies William Newton Mercer, William J. Minor, and Levin R. Marshall, he had been a Conservative Whig and was "bitterly opposed to secession." He declined to offer any assistance to the Confederate cause and was ostracized by other Southerners. With investments worth $1,060,000 unrelated to his plantations, he was able to live comfortably regardless of the outcome of the war. In 1863, Duncan left Natchez and moved to New York City. He unsuccessfully attempted to lobby the Lincoln administration to protect his slaveholdings in Union occupied Mississippi.

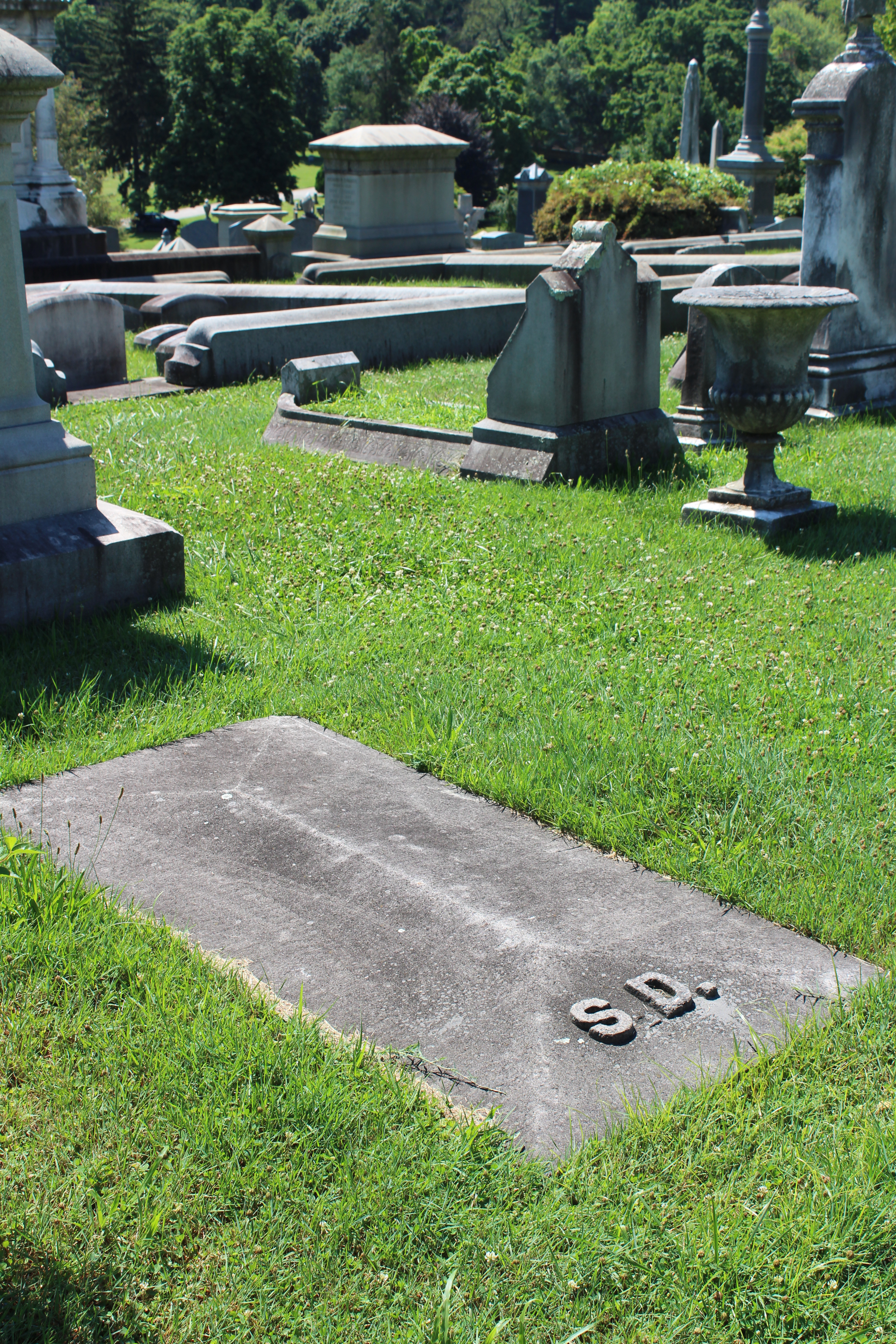
Stephen Duncan gravestone in Laurel Hill Cemetery

Duncan died on January 29, 1867, in New York City, and was interred in Laurel Hill Cemetery in Philadelphia, Pennsylvania.

== Descendants and legacy ==
Duncan married Margaret Ellis, a granddaughter of Richard Ellis, for whom the Ellis Cliffs near Natchez were named. they had two children together, John Ellis Duncan and Sarah Jane Duncan. Their daughter Sarah Jane Duncan married Dr. William Irvine. The Irvines died by the mid-1840s, leaving two daughters Irvine.

After his first wife died, Duncan married again in 1819, to Catherine A. Bingaman, a daughter of Adam Bingaman. The wedding ceremony was performed by Edward Turner. They had five children:

- Henry P. Duncan (1824–) m. Mary Sargent (1829–)
- Samuel P. Duncan m. Martha Parker
- Charlot N. Duncan m. Samuel M. Davis
- Maria L. Duncan m. J. J. Pringle
- Stephen Duncan Jr. (1835–1910)

In 1910, his heirs donated the Auburn mansion and its gardens to the city of Natchez. The mansion and grounds were designated as Duncan Memorial Park by the city of Natchez.

== See also ==
- List of slave owners
- Arthur P. Hayne, U.S. Senator and cousin-in-law

== Sources ==
- Brazy, Martha Jane (2006). An American Planter. Louisiana State University Press. ISBN 978-0-8071-3141-1.
- Rothstein, Morton (1979). "The Changing Social Networks and Investment Behavior of a Slaveholding Elite in the Ante Bellum South: Some Natchez Nabobs, 1800–1860". In Greenfield, Sidney M.; Strickon, Arnold; Aubey, Robert T. (eds.). Entrepreneurs in Cultural Context. School of American Research, Advanced Seminar Series. Albuquerque: University of New Mexico Press. pp. 65–88. ISBN 978-0-8263-0504-6. LCCN 78021433. OCLC 4859059.
- Scarborough, William Kauffman (2006). Masters of the Big House: Elite Slaveholders of the Mid-nineteenth century South. Louisiana State University Press. ISBN 0-8071-2882-1.
