= Mississippi-in-Africa =

Private colony in present-day Liberia

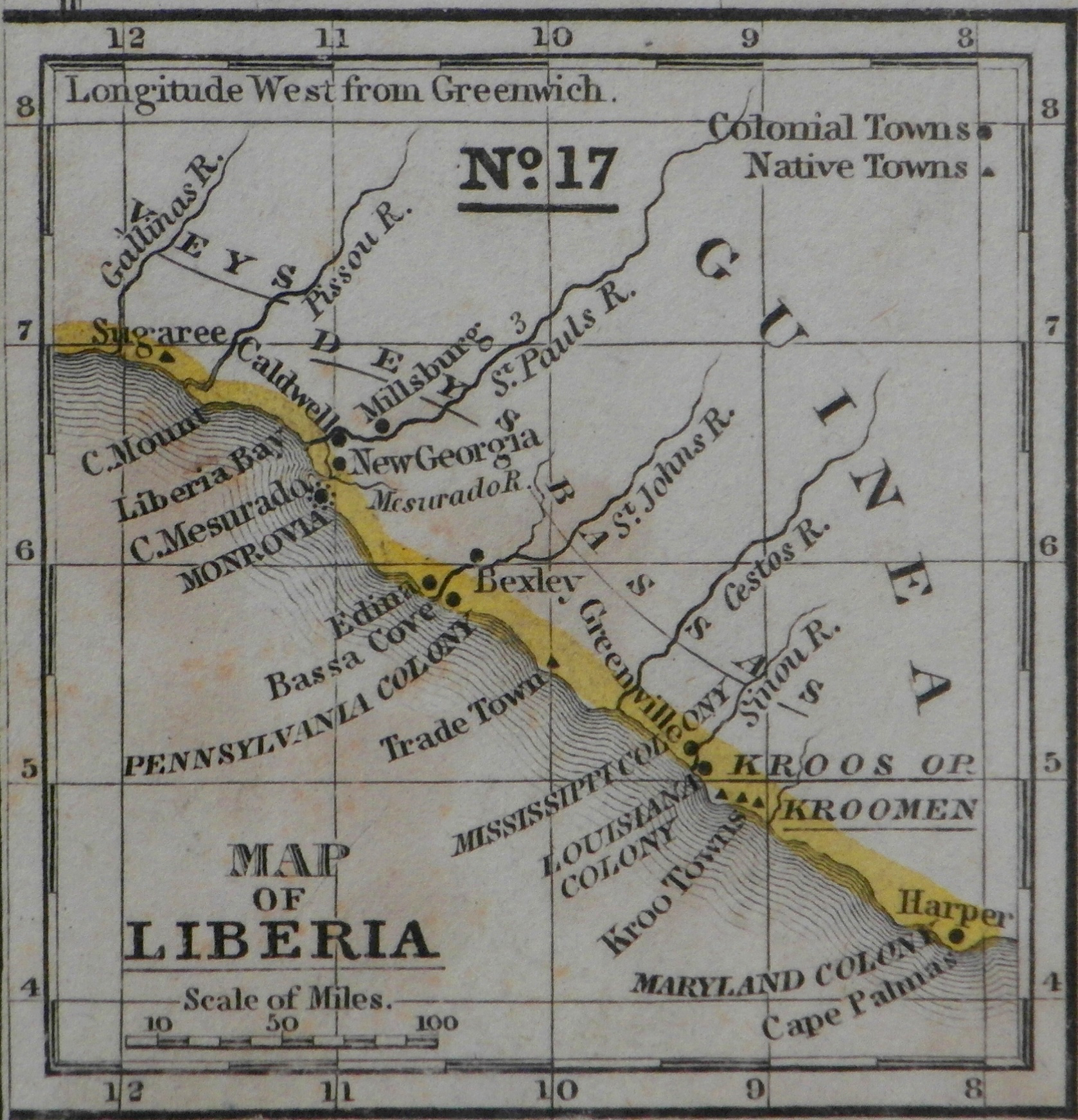
Map of Liberia in the 1830s, where the Mississippi colony and other state-sponsored colonies are identified.

Mississippi-in-Africa was a colony on the Pepper Coast (West Africa) founded in the 1830s by the Mississippi Colonization Society of the United States and settled by American free people of color, many of them former slaves. In the late 1840s, some 300 former slaves from Prospect Hill Plantation and other Isaac Ross properties in Jefferson County, Mississippi, were the largest single group of emigrants to the new colony. Ross had freed the slaves in his will and provided for his plantation to be sold to pay for their transportation and initial costs.

These freedmen and other American immigrants to the colony and its neighbors — Liberia (which annexed Mississippi-in-Africa in 1842) and the Republic of Maryland (which merged with Liberia in 1857) — developed as the Americo-Liberians, an ethnic group who formed a political and economic elite. They dominated what became the independent country of Liberia into the late 20th century, having taken power over the indigenous people. The Mississippi colony was located in what is present-day Sinoe County, Liberia.

== History ==
The American Colonization Society was founded in the United States in 1816 as a joint project by proslavery and antislavery advocates to establish a colony for free American blacks in West Africa. Slaveholders wanted to relocate free people of color out of the South, as they believed that free blacks threatened the stability of their slave societies. Some who supported eventual abolition of slavery believed that transporting former slaves to Africa would give them a better opportunity to make their own communities. Disheartened by the discrimination faced by free blacks in the North, some abolitionists also supported the ACS, because they thought free blacks might be able to create a better society for themselves in Africa.

Most free blacks did not want to emigrate; they considered the colonization plan to be a means to export them. They believed they had a native-born claim to the United States, were part of the society, and wanted to gain equal rights in their native land. Samuel Cornish and John Brown Russwurm published Freedom's Journal in New York City, writing articles that opposed the colonization movement.

In June 1831, major planters and slaveholders Stephen Duncan, Isaac Ross (1760–1838), Edward McGehee (1786–1880), John Ker (1789–1850), and educator Jeremiah Chamberlain (1794–1851), president of Oakland College, co-founded the Mississippi Colonization Society. Their goal was to remove free people of color and former slaves from their state to the developing colony of Liberia on the African continent. This Society bought a portion of land for the colony, which was known as Mississippi-in-Africa. They believed that free blacks threatened the stability of slave societies, and Mississippi's population had a majority of slaves, outnumbering whites by a three-to-one ratio.

The first settlers arrived in 1837. The town of Greenville was built in about 1838 by the colonists. Greenville was named after Judge James Green, one of the first Mississippi Delta planters to send a group of former slaves to Liberia.

Josiah Finley, the brother of ACS founder Robert Finley, was governor of Mississippi-in-Africa from June 1837 to September 10, 1838, when he was murdered by local fishermen.

Isaac Ross provided for manumission of his slaves in his will, if they agreed to relocation to West Africa. His plantation was to be sold to provide funds for transportation and for supplies for the pioneer settlers. A grandson contested the will, but it was upheld by Mississippi's High Court of Errors and Appeals (since renamed the Supreme Court of Mississippi). In the late 1840s, approximately 300 African-American freedmen from Ross's Prospect Hill Plantation emigrated to Mississippi-in-Africa. They were the largest single group of American colonists to migrate to Liberia.

Ross's grandson and heir Isaac Ross Wade contested the will through years of litigation, during which time he occupied the plantation. Wade was supposed to pay the freedmen for their labor. In 1847 the court ruled that the slaves, then technically free, could leave the United States. In 1848 the last group of Ross's freed people emigrated to the colony in West Africa. The passage to Africa was arranged by the Mississippi Colonization Society. It had purchased land on the Pepper Coast for a colony for freedmen from Mississippi. The late Ross was the first among its founders to have arranged for manumission of his slaves.

The freedmen developed a society in West Africa much like the one they had left but taking the dominant position in relation to indigenous people. They built houses in the style of Southern mansions and established a hierarchical society with strong continuities to what they had known in the United States. They established plantations and battled local ethnic groups for control of the territory, believing their American culture and Christianity made them superior. This settlement existed independently from 1835 until 1842, when it was incorporated into the Commonwealth of Liberia. In 1847 Liberia became independent of the American Colonization Society.

Journalist Alan Huffman's history of the settlement explores its influence in contributing to more than a century of resentment between the majority of tribal peoples and the Americo-Liberians, descendants of the colonists who dominated the politics and economy of Liberia well into the 20th century. These groups have been on opposite sides of the civil war in Liberia since the 1980s.

== Timeline ==
- June 1831 — Mississippi Colonization Society founded
- 1835 — Mississippi and Louisiana State Colonization societies found Mississippi-in-Africa colony
- June 1837 — Josiah Finley named governor
- September 10, 1838 — Finley murdered
- 1841 — Thomas Buchanan named Acting Agent (but not in residence)
- 1842 — Incorporation into the Commonwealth of Liberia
- 1844 — Richard E. Murray named governor

== See also ==
- History of Liberia
- History of slavery in Mississippi
- Kentucky-in-Africa
- Republic of Maryland
- Mississippi in Africa: The Saga of the Slaves of Prospect Hill Plantation and Their Legacy in Liberia Today – A book about slaves who settled there
