= Rosswood =

Historic house in Mississippi, United States

Coordinates: 31°49′7.35″N 91°0′43.46″W

- U.S. National Register of Historic Places
- Location within Mississippi Location within the United States
- Nearest city: Lorman, Mississippi
- Area: 100 acres (40 ha)
- Built: 1857
- Architect: Shroder, David
- Architectural style: Greek Revival
- NRHP reference No.: 78001606
- Added to NRHP: December 8, 1978

Rosswood is a historic Southern plantation located off of Mississippi Highway 552, in Lorman, Jefferson County, Mississippi, USA. It was listed on the National Register of Historic Places in 1978.

It is also a Mississippi Landmark.

== History ==
It was built as a cotton plantation for Dr Walter Ross Wade (1810–1862) and his wife Mabella Chamberlain. The architectural style of the plantation house is Greek Revival.

It has 14 rooms, with 14-foot (4.3 m) high ceilings, ten fireplaces, columned galleries, a winding staircase and original slave quarters. Before the American Civil War, Wade and his wife held parties and balls and entertained guests. The property spanned 1,250 acres (510 ha) and had 105 slaves. It is now only 100 acres (40 ha). During the Civil War, it was used as a hospital for the Confederate States Army.

In 1975, Colonel Walt Hylander and his wife Jean purchased the plantation and restored it. It was opened to the public as a house museum, and used for weddings and special occasions. In March 2019, Rosswood permanently closed to the public and is now a private residence. The Hylanders have passed the house on to their son Ray, and the house is now for sale. Google Rosswood for sale.

== See also ==
- Prospect Hill Plantation
