= African Repository =

The African Repository and Colonial Journal, title simplified in 1850 to the African Repository, was the official publication of the American Colonization Society, which supported the migration of free American Blacks to Africa, specifically to its colony of Liberia. It began publication in 1825. The name of the magazine was changed in 1892 to Liberia. It is a primary source for the early history of Liberia.

The African Repository was edited for 25 years by Ralph Randolph Gurley, an American Colonization Society administrator.
