= Mississippi in Africa: The Saga of the Slaves of Prospect Hill Plantation and Their Legacy in Liberia Today =

2004 non-fiction book

Mississippi in Africa: The Saga of the Slaves of Prospect Hill Plantation and Their Legacy in Liberia Today is a 2004 non-fiction book by Alan Huffman, originally published by Gotham Books and re-issued in 2010 by University Press of Mississippi. It chronicles Americo-Liberians who originated from the Prospect Hill Plantation in Mississippi and who settled Mississippi-in-Africa.

The book had a working title of "Prospect Hill" though the final title was "Mississippi in Africa".

== Reception ==
Publishers Weekly praised the "fascinating" concept, though it criticized the excessive detail which it argued made the pace "plodding", and that the book "meanders" with excessive commentary from the author.

Kirkus Reviews stated that it is "Thought-provoking and expertly told—and a most promising debut."

The Journal of Pan African Studies stated that the work has "riveting prose".
