= Saragossa (Natchez, Mississippi) =

Historic house in Mississippi, United States

- U.S. National Register of Historic Places
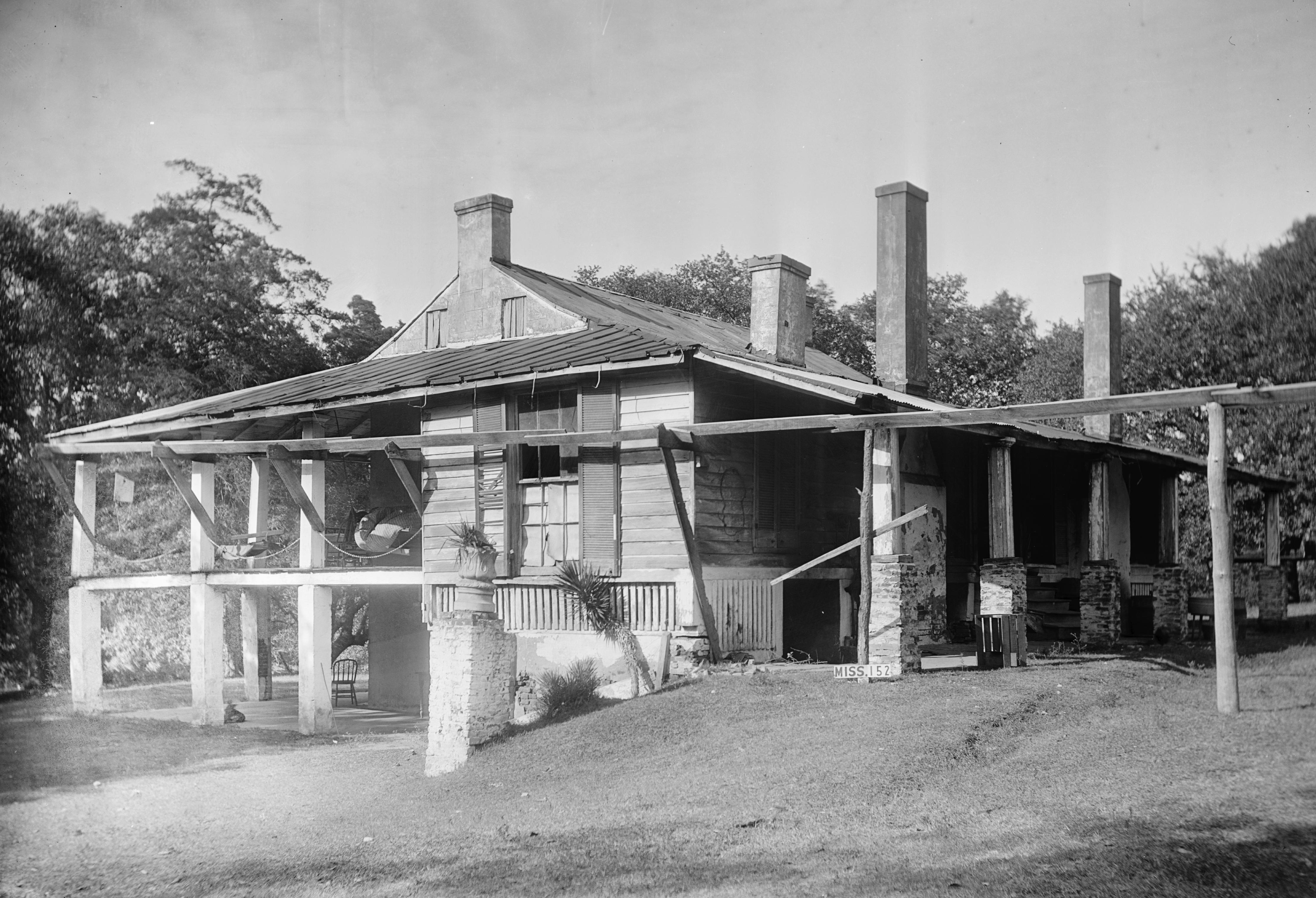

- Location within Mississippi Location within the United States
- Location: Natchez, Mississippi
- Coordinates: 31°29′30″N 91°24′6″W
- Area: 8.3 acres (3.4 ha)
- Built: 1810
- NRHP reference No.: 80002196
- Added to NRHP: November 24, 1980

Saragossa was a plantation in Natchez, Adams County, Mississippi.

== Location ==
It is located on Saragossa Road in Natchez, Mississippi.

== History ==
The plantation was established in 1823 by Stephen Duncan (1787-1867), the wealthiest cotton planter and the second largest slaveowner in the Antebellum South. Cotton was the main cash crop grown here.

In 1835, William St. John Elliot, who also owned D'Evereux, purchased the plantation. In 1849, it was purchased by William G. Conner, who sold it back to Elliot in 1852. That same year, in 1852, it was purchased by Winfield Gibson. Three years later, in 1855, it was purchased by Caroline Williams, who bequeathed it to her daughter, Anna (Williams) Smith, and her son-in-law, Walton Pembroke Smith. It then stayed in the Smith family until the 1970s.

It has been listed on the National Register of Historic Places since November 24, 1980.
