= Prospect Hill Plantation =

Coordinates: 31.838261°N 90.949590°W

- Location within Mississippi
- Location: near Lorman, Mississippi

History
- Built: c. 1808; rebuilt 1854
- Built for: Isaac Ross

Site notes
- Architectural style: Greek Revival
- Governing body: Archeological Conservancy

The Prospect Hill Plantation was a former 5,000-acre plantation in Jefferson County, Mississippi. In the early 19th century, the plantation was owned by planter Isaac Ross of South Carolina, who enslaved African American people to farm cotton as a cash crop. In 1830, Ross and other major planters co-founded the Mississippi chapter of the American Colonization Society, which sought to move enslaved people to Mississippi-in-Africa, a colony on the coast of what became Liberia.

In 1836, Ross died, and his will freed those enslaved people who agreed to move to Mississippi-in-Africa, and provided for sale of his plantation to fund their move. His will was contested and litigated by a grandson and heir who occupied the plantation while the court case and appeals were litigated. The will was finally upheld by the Mississippi Supreme Court in 1845. That year, the mansion had burned down and a girl died in the fire. About a dozen enslaved people suspected as responsible were lynched. The plantation was finally sold, and about 300 enslaved people were freed and transported by 1848 to Mississippi-in-Africa. They and their descendants were among the Americo-Liberian elite that held power into the late 20th century.

In the 1850s, Ross' grandson Isaac Ross Wade reacquired the Prospect Hill property, building a second plantation great house in 1854. Wade and Ross family descendants occupied the house until 1956, and it was occupied by others until 1968.

This mansion still stands today. In 2011 the plantation and house were acquired by the Archeological Conservancy for preservation of the total property. It is expected to yield artifacts that will contribute to the story of slavery in the United States, as well as to African-American culture and the diaspora.

== Location ==
The plantation is located in a rural area near Lorman in Jefferson County, Mississippi. By car, it is located 15 minutes east of Lorman, 20 minutes away from Port Gibson, and 45 away from Natchez.

== History ==
The plantation was built for Isaac Ross, a South Carolina slave owner. He migrated with an older brother to Mississippi in 1808, taking a contingent of enslaved people, as well as some free Blacks who had served with him in the war. He developed the property as a cotton plantation, and enslaved many more people to develop and work it. He eventually enslaved nearly 300 people and acquired other plantations as well.

The plantation had a cemetery, where Isaac Ross and some of his family were buried. After his grandson Isaac Ross Wade reacquired the plantation, this area became known as the Wade Family Cemetery. The mansion and cemetery property acquired by the Conservancy span 23 acres.

=== Family history ===
Isaac Ross died in 1836 and was buried in the cemetery on his plantation. The Mississippi Colonization Society (of which he was a co-founder) commissioned a monument to him for US$25,000 (~$767,738 in 2025) two years later. They had it installed at his gravesite in 1838.

Ross' grandson Isaac Ross Wade, contested the will, but it was upheld by the Mississippi Supreme Court in 1845. There were additional legal delays, but during this period, the enslaved people stayed on the plantation and worked for Wade. They were technically considered free, under the terms of the will, and were supposed to receive pay.

On an April night in 1845, a fire in the mansion burned it down, killing a six-year-old white girl. A Wade descendant attributed it to a slave uprising; and 12 suspects among the enslaved people were quickly captured and lynched.

In the settlement of the court case, the enslaved people gained their freedom and the plantation was sold to fund their migration to the colony in West Africa, which the final group reached in 1848. They never received any of the pay owed for their three years of working for Wade. The area near Monrovia where freed enslaved people from Mississippi were settled became known as Mississippi-in-Africa. It later became part of the country of Liberia.

Wade ultimately reacquired the plantation property and had a new great house built in 1854. He and his descendants lived there, with family ownership extending into the 20th century.

=== 20th century to present ===
The last Ross and Wade family descendants left in 1956, by which time the outbuildings had collapsed: the kitchen, slave quarters, smokehouse and barns. The mansion at Prospect Hill Plantation is still standing, although it has deteriorated in its decades of vacancy. The roof was damaged by Hurricane Katrina in 2005. In 2011, it was purchased by the Archeological Conservancy, a non-profit organization, to preserve it and the property. It has received $50,000 from the Mississippi Department of Archives and History as well as private donations for preservation purposes.

Planned archeological excavation of the grounds is expected to yield important evidence about the African-American culture of the slaves and their relation to the diaspora. In 2014 the Archeological Conservancy held a reunion at the plantation for descendants of its residents: "descendants of the divided slave-holding family, the slaves who remained in the area, and the slaves who emigrated to Liberia."

The Prospect Hill Plantation Collection papers, from the period 1873–1917, are kept at the library on the campus of the University of Mississippi in Oxford, Mississippi. They are primarily copies of tenant and other contracts, as well as family correspondence.

== See also ==
- Rosswood
- Mississippi in Africa: The Saga of the Slaves of Prospect Hill Plantation and Their Legacy in Liberia Today - A book about slaves from this plantation who emigrated to Liberia
