= Kentucky in Africa =

Colony founded in Liberia in 1828

- 1828–c. 1847
- Status: Colony (American Colonization Society)
- Capital: Clay-Ashland
- Historical era: Imperialism
  - Established: 1828
  - Disestablished: c. 1847

Area
  - Total: 100 km^{2} (39 sq mi)
Preceded by
American Colonization Society
- Today part of: Liberia

Kentucky in Africa was a colony in present-day Montserrado County, Liberia, founded in 1828 and settled by American free people of color, many of them former slaves. A state affiliate of the American Colonization Society, the Kentucky State Colonization Society raised money to transport people of color from Kentucky—freeborn volunteers as well as enslaved individuals set free on the condition that they leave the United States for Liberia. The Kentucky society bought a 40-square-mile (100 km^{2}) site along the Saint Paul River and named it Kentucky in Africa. Clay-Ashland, named after Henry Clay's Ashland Plantation, was the colony's primary settlement.

Notable residents of Kentucky in Africa include Alfred Francis Russell, the 10th President of Liberia, and William D. Coleman, the 13th President of Liberia, whose family settled in Clay-Ashland after emigrating from Fayette County, Kentucky.

Kentucky in Africa was annexed by Liberia in about 1847.
