= Pepper Coast =

European historical term for a region of West Africa

Coordinates: 5.2°N 9.5°W

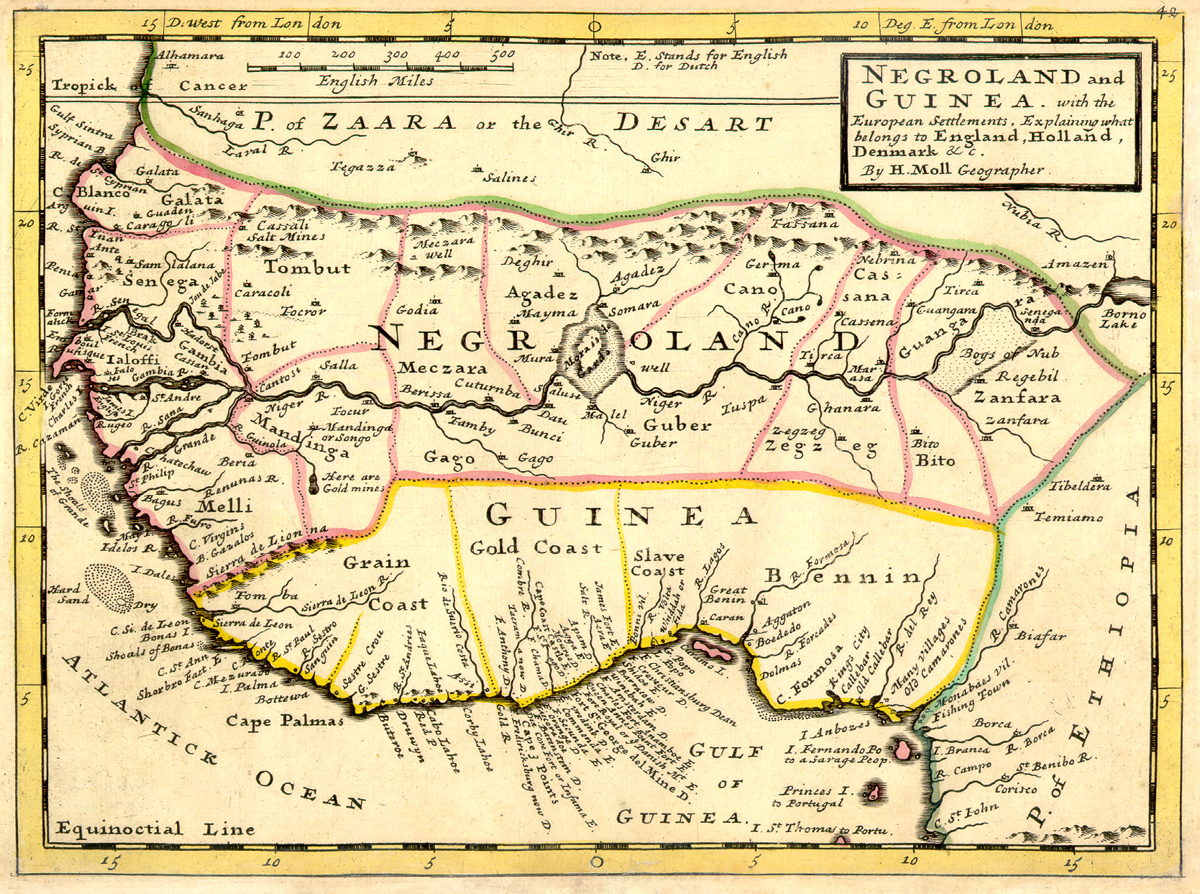
Map by Herman Moll, London, 1729, showing the Grain Coast

The Pepper Coast or Grain Coast was a coastal area of western Africa, between Cape Mesurado and Cape Palmas. It encloses the present republic of Liberia. The name was given by European traders.

== Origin of the name ==
The Pepper Coast got its name from the availability in the region of the melegueta pepper (Aframomum melegueta), also known as the "grain of paradise", which in turn gave rise to an alternative name, the Grain Coast. The importance of the spice is shown by the designation of the area from the Saint John River (at present-day Buchanan) to Harper in Liberia as the "Grain Coast", in reference to the availability of grains of paradise. In some cases (as shown on the map pictured above), this term covers a wider area incorporating Sierra Leone and the Ivory Coast.

== See also ==
- Slave Coast of West Africa
- Gold Coast (region)
- Guinea (region)
- Windward Coast
