= American Colonization Society =

19th-century organization in the United States

- Reconstruction of the ACS logo, from 1840
- Abbreviation: ACS
- Formation: December 21, 1816; 209 years ago
- Founder: Robert Finley
- Founded at: Davis Hotel, Washington, D.C.
- Dissolved: 1964; 62 years ago
- Purpose: To facilitate the migration of free people of color from the United States to the Colony of Liberia.
- Region served: United States and Liberia
- Funding: Membership fees, congressional grants
- Formerly called: Society for the Colonization of Free People of Color of America

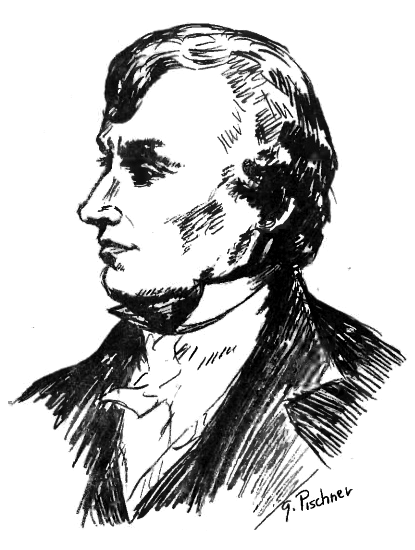
Robert Finley founded the American Colonization Society.

The American Colonization Society (ACS), initially the Society for the Colonization of Free People of Color of America, was an American organization founded in 1816 by Robert Finley to encourage and facilitate repatriation of freeborn people of color and emancipated slaves to sub-Saharan Africa, particularly the Grain Coast. It was modeled on an earlier British Committee for the Relief of the Black Poor's colonization in sub-Saharan Africa, which had sought to resettle London's black poor. Until the ACS's dissolution in 1964, the society was headquartered in Room 516 of the Colorado Building in Washington, D.C.

The American Colonization Society was established in 1816 to address the belief that free people of color could not integrate into U.S. society, and should thus relocate to Africa. The population of such free people had grown steadily following the American Revolutionary War, from 60,000 in 1790 to 300,000 by 1830. Slave owners feared these free Black people might help their slaves to escape or organize slave rebellions. In addition, many White Americans believed African Americans were inherently inferior and should be relocated.

The ACS's plan was opposed by most Black Americans and also by most of the abolitionist movement. For example, minister Jermain Loguen of Syracuse, New York stated:

We recognize in it ["the scheme of African Colonization"] the most intense hatred of the colored race, clad in the garb of pretended philanthropy; and we regard the revival of colonization societies...as...manifestations of a passion fit only for demons to indulge in.

In most cases, African-American families had lived in the United States for generations, and they felt no more affinity for Africa than a white American might feel for Europe where his ancestors originated decades earlier. Contrary to claims their emigration was voluntary, many African-Americans, both free and enslaved, were pressured into emigrating. Indeed, some enslavers, such as Zephaniah Kingsley, sometimes freed their slaves on condition that the freedmen leave the country immediately.

According to historian Marc Leepson, "Colonization proved to be a giant failure, doing nothing to stem the forces that brought the nation to Civil War." Between 1821 and 1847, only a few thousand African Americans, out of millions, emigrated to what would become Liberia, while the increase in Black population in the U.S. during those same years was about 500,000. By 1833, the Society had transported only 2,769 individuals out of the U.S. According to Zephaniah Kingsley, the cost of transporting the Black population of the United States to sub-Saharan Africa would exceed the annual revenues of the country. Mortality was the highest since accurate record-keeping began: close to half the arrivals in Liberia died from tropical diseases, especially malaria; during the early years, 22% of immigrants died within one year. Moreover, the provisioning and transportation of requisite tools and supplies proved very expensive.

Starting in the 1830s, the society was met with great hostility from abolitionists, led by Gerrit Smith, who had supported the society financially, and William Lloyd Garrison, author of Thoughts on African Colonization (1832), in which he proclaimed the society a fraud. According to Garrison and his many followers, the society was not a solution to the problem of American slavery—it actually was helping, and was intended to help, to preserve it.

== Background ==
=== Growth of slavery in the South ===
After the invention of the cotton gin in the 1790s, the growth and export of cotton became a highly profitable business. Central to the business was the setting up of plantations, staffed by enslaved laborers. Due to the increased demand, imports of African slaves grew until legal importation was barred in 1808, after which time Maryland and Virginia openly bred slaves, "producing" children for sale "South", through brokers such as Franklin and Armfield, to plantation owners. This resulted in the forcible relocation of about one million enslaved people to the Deep South. The sub-Saharan Africans and African Americans became well established and had children, and the total number of the enslaved reached four million by the mid-19th century.

=== Growth in the number of free black people ===
Due in part to manumission efforts sparked by revolutionary ideals, Protestant preachers, and the abolitionist movement, there was an expansion in the number of free black people, many of them born free. Even in the North, where slavery was being abolished, discrimination against free black people was rampant and often legal. Few states extended citizenship rights to free black people prior to the 1860s and the Federal government, largely controlled by Slave Power, never showed any inclination to challenge the racial status quo. Even in the North, free black people were often seen as unwelcome immigrants, taking jobs away because they would work for cheap.

Some slave owners decided to support emigration following an aborted slave rebellion headed by Gabriel Prosser in 1800, and a rapid increase in the number of free African Americans in the United States in the first two decades after the Revolutionary War, which they perceived as threatening. Although the ratio of white people to black people overall was 4:1 between 1790 and 1800, in some Southern counties black people were the majority. Slaveholders feared that free black people destabilized their slave society and created a political threat. From 1790 to 1800, the number of free black people increased from 59,467 to 108,398, and by 1810 there were 186,446 free black people.

=== British "black poor" colonization in Africa ===
In 1786, a British organization, the Committee for the Relief of the Black Poor, launched its efforts to establish the Sierra Leone Province of Freedom, a colony in West Africa for London's "black poor". This enterprise gained the support of the British government, which also offered relocation to Black Loyalists who had been resettled in Nova Scotia, where they were subject to harsh weather and discrimination from some white Nova Scotians. Jamaica maroons were also deported to the British colony, alongside former slaves freed by the Royal Navy after the Atlantic slave trade was abolished by Britain in 1807.

=== Paul Cuffe ===
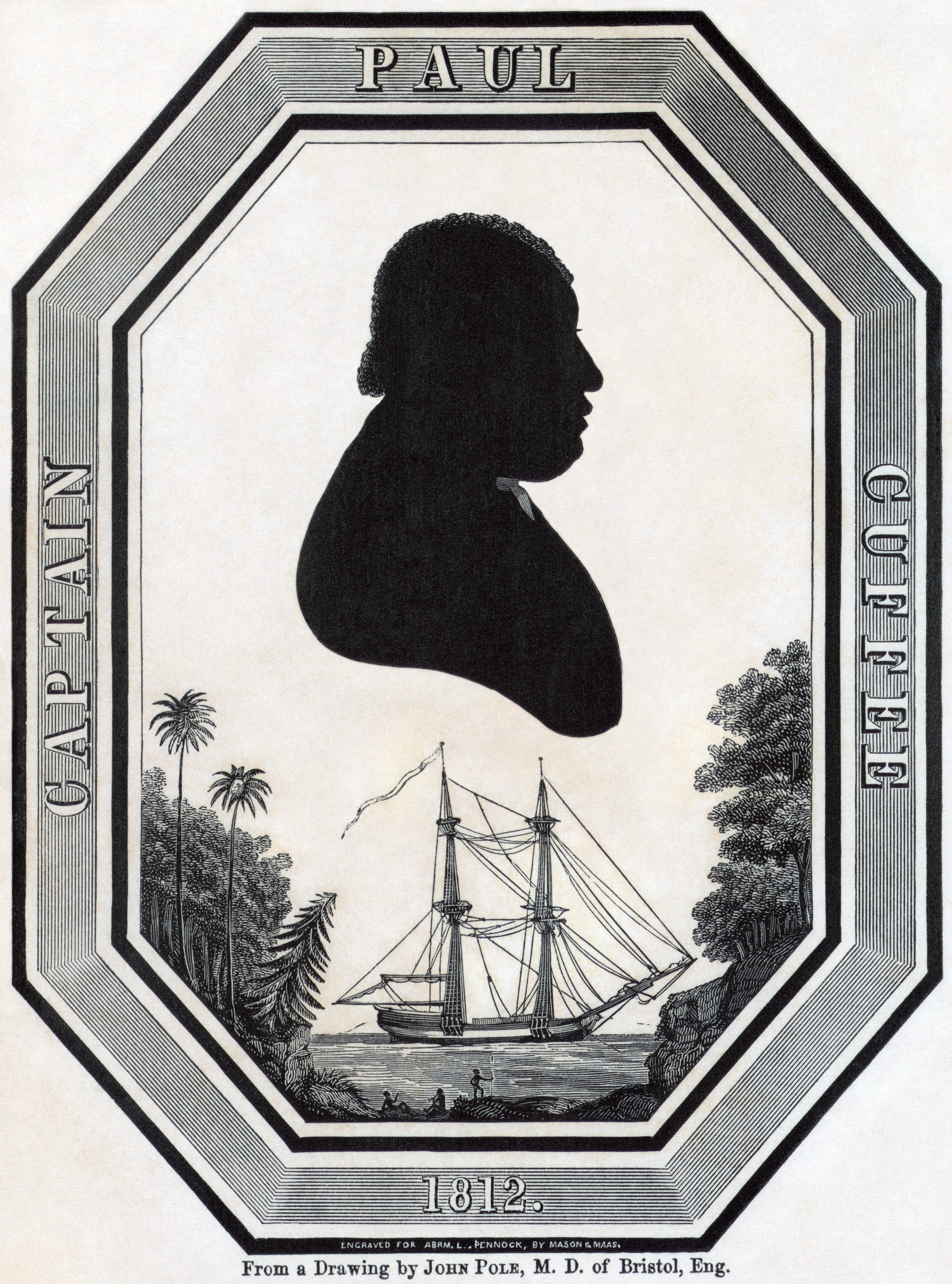
Drawing of Paul Cuffe (1812)

Paul Cuffe or Cuffee (1759–1817) was a successful Quaker ship owner and activist in Boston. His parents were of Ashanti (sub-Saharan African) and Wampanoag (Native American) heritage. He advocated settling freed American slaves in Africa and gained support from the British government, free Black leaders in the United States, and members of Congress to take emigrants to the British colony of Sierra Leone. In 1815, he financed a trip himself. The following year, Cuffe took 38 American black people to Freetown, Sierra Leone. He died in 1817 before undertaking other voyages. Cuffe laid the groundwork for the American Colonization Society.

== Early history ==
=== Founding ===
The ACS had its origins in 1816, when Charles Fenton Mercer, a Federalist member of the Virginia General Assembly, discovered accounts of earlier legislative debates on black colonization in the wake of Gabriel Prosser's rebellion. Mercer pushed the state to support the idea. One of his political contacts in Washington City, John Caldwell, in turn contacted the Reverend Robert Finley, his brother-in-law and a Presbyterian minister, who endorsed the plan.

John Randolph

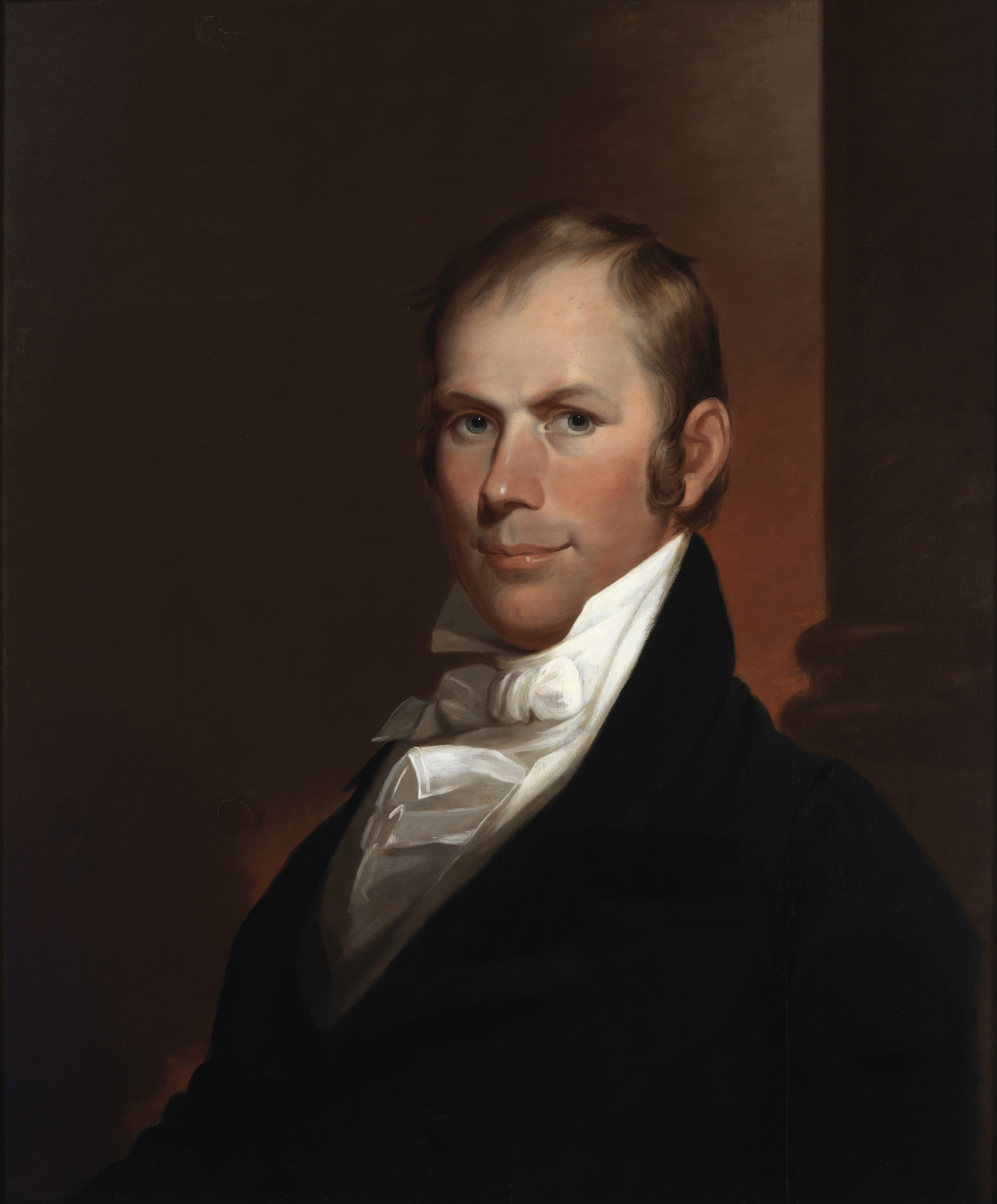
Henry Clay

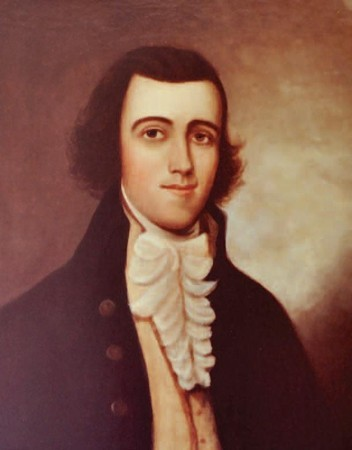
Richard Bland Lee

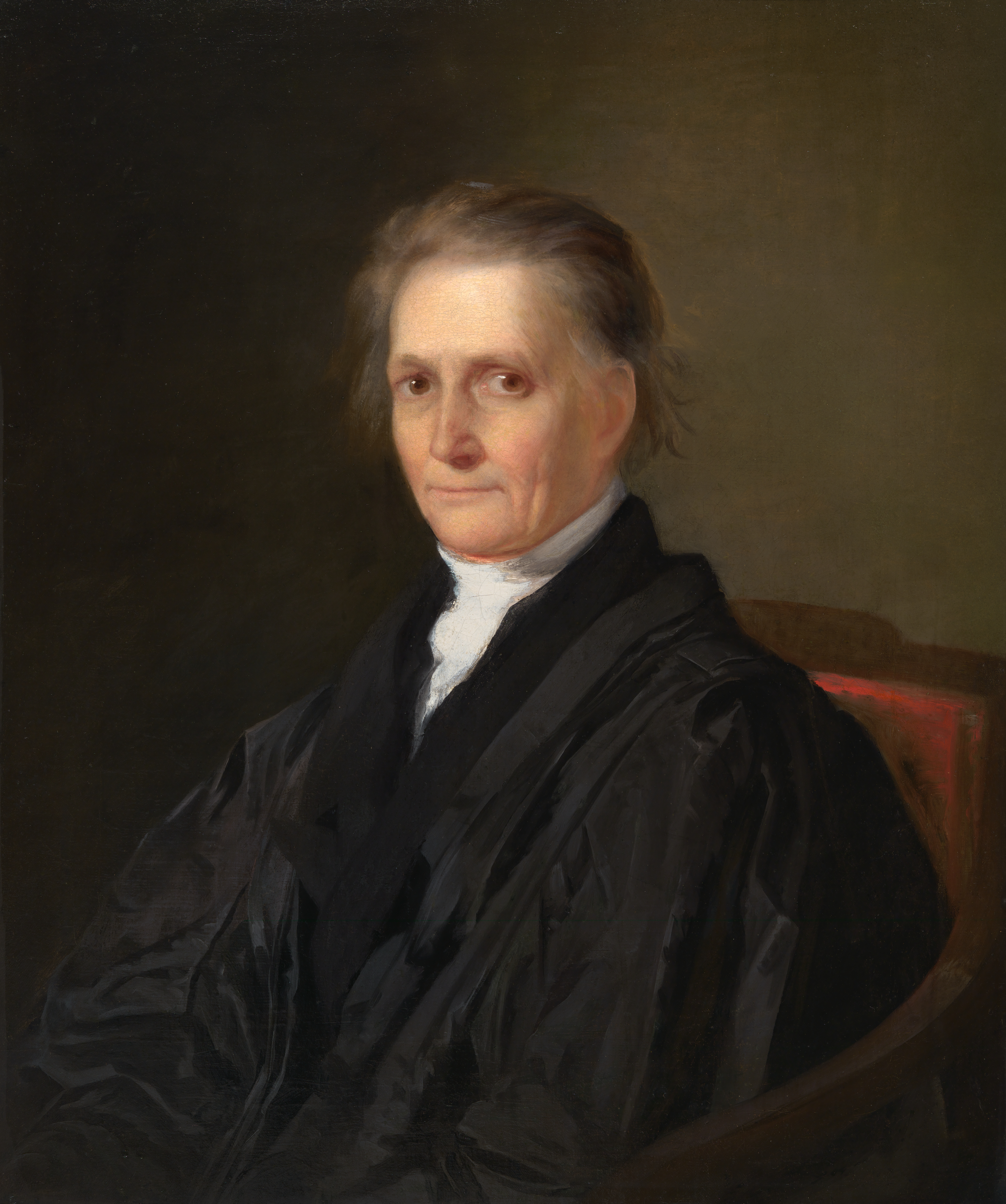
Bushrod Washington

Four early organizers of the American Society for Colonizing the Free People of Color of the United States.

On December 21, 1816, the society was officially established at the Davis Hotel in Washington, D.C. Among the Society's supporters were Charles Fenton Mercer (from Virginia), Henry Clay (Kentucky), John Randolph (Virginia), Richard Bland Lee (Virginia), Francis Scott Key (Washington, D.C., and Maryland), and Bushrod Washington (Virginia). Slaveholders in the Virginia Piedmont region in the 1820s and 1830s comprised many of its most prominent members; slave-owning United States presidents Thomas Jefferson, James Monroe, and James Madison were among its supporters. Madison served as the Society's president in the early 1830s. Jefferson even proposed that whites be imported to fill the vacuum left by the colonization of blacks. He suggested that ships be sent out to collect a number of white people equal to the number of black people being colonized to Liberia.

At the inaugural meeting of the Society, Reverend Finley suggested that a colony be established in Africa to take free people of color, most of whom had been born free, away from the United States. Finley meant to colonize "(with their consent) the free people of color residing in our country, in Africa, or such other place as Congress may deem most expedient". The organization established branches throughout the United States, mostly in Southern states. It was instrumental in establishing the colony of Liberia.

The ACS was founded by groups otherwise opposed to each other on the issue of slavery. Slaveholders, such as those in the Maryland branch and elsewhere, believed that so-called repatriation was a way to remove free Blacks from slave societies and avoid slave rebellions. (Note: Although Randolph believed that the removal of free blacks would "materially tend to secure" slave property, the vast majority of early members wanted to free African slaves and their descendants and provide them with the opportunity to "return" to Africa.) Free black people, many of whom had been in the United States for generations, also encouraged and assisted slaves to escape, and depressing their value. ("Every attempt by the South to aid the Colonization Society, to send free colored people to Africa, enhances the value of the slave left on the soil".) The Society appeared to hold contradictory ideas: free Blacks should be removed because they could not benefit America; on the other hand, free Blacks would prosper and thrive under their own leadership in another land. (Note: Henry Clay thought that deportation of free blacks was preferable to trying to integrate them in America, believing that: "unconquerable prejudice resulting from their color, they never could amalgamate with the free whites of this country. It was desirable, therefore, as it respected them, and the residue of the population of the country, to drain them off.")

On the other hand, a coalition made up mostly of evangelicals, Quakers, philanthropists, and abolitionists supported abolition of slavery. They wanted slaves to be free and believed Blacks would face better chances for freedom in Africa than in the United States, since they were not welcome in the South or North. (Note: In the north, for instance, there were negative beliefs about African Americans. One was that some northerners felt that African Americans had a natural tendency toward criminality. "Massachusetts politician Edward Everett spoke for many Northern colonizationists when he supported colonizing free blacks, whom he described as vagabonds, criminals, and a drain on Northern society." Another belief was that African Americans could not be educated or become citizens since they were believed to be mentally inferior to whites, and thus unfit for citizenship. As formulated by racist author Thomas Dixon Jr., "The negro is a human donkey. You can train him, but you can't make of him a horse." Some Society members were openly racist and frequently argued that free blacks would be unable to assimilate into the white society of the United States. John Randolph, a Virginia politician and major slaveholder, said that free blacks were "promoters of mischief". The proposed solution was to have free Blacks deported from the United States "back to Africa".) The two opposed groups found common ground in support of what they called "repatriation".

=== Prestige ===
When founded, the ACS was "accepted everywhere as 'a most glorious Christian enterprise'." Every church in the land devoted one Sunday a year for a colonization sermon and offering.

=== Leadership ===
The presidents of the ACS tended to be Southerners. The first president was Bushrod Washington, the nephew of U.S. President George Washington and an Associate Justice of the Supreme Court of the United States. From 1836 to 1849 the statesman Henry Clay of Kentucky, a planter and slaveholder, was ACS president. John H. B. Latrobe served as president of the ACS from 1853 until his death in 1891.

=== Goals ===
The colonization project, which had multiple American Colonization Society chapters in every state, had three goals. One was to provide a place for former slaves, freedmen, and their descendants to live, where they would be free and not subject to racism. Another goal was to ensure that the colony had what it needed to succeed, such as fertile soil to grow crops. A third goal was to suppress attempts to engage in the Atlantic slave trade, such as by monitoring ship traffic on the coast. Presbyterian clergyman Lyman Beecher proposed another goal: the Christianization of Africa. (Note: Presbyterian clergyman Lyman Beecher said of the goal to Christianize Africa: It is not necessary that the Colonization Society should be or claim to be an adequate remedy for slavery. Her great and primary object, is the emancipation of Africa, while she anticipated as an incidental result, the emancipation of the colored race at home. But if time has disclosed what she could not foresee, she may bow submissively to the providential will of heaven.)

=== Fundraising ===
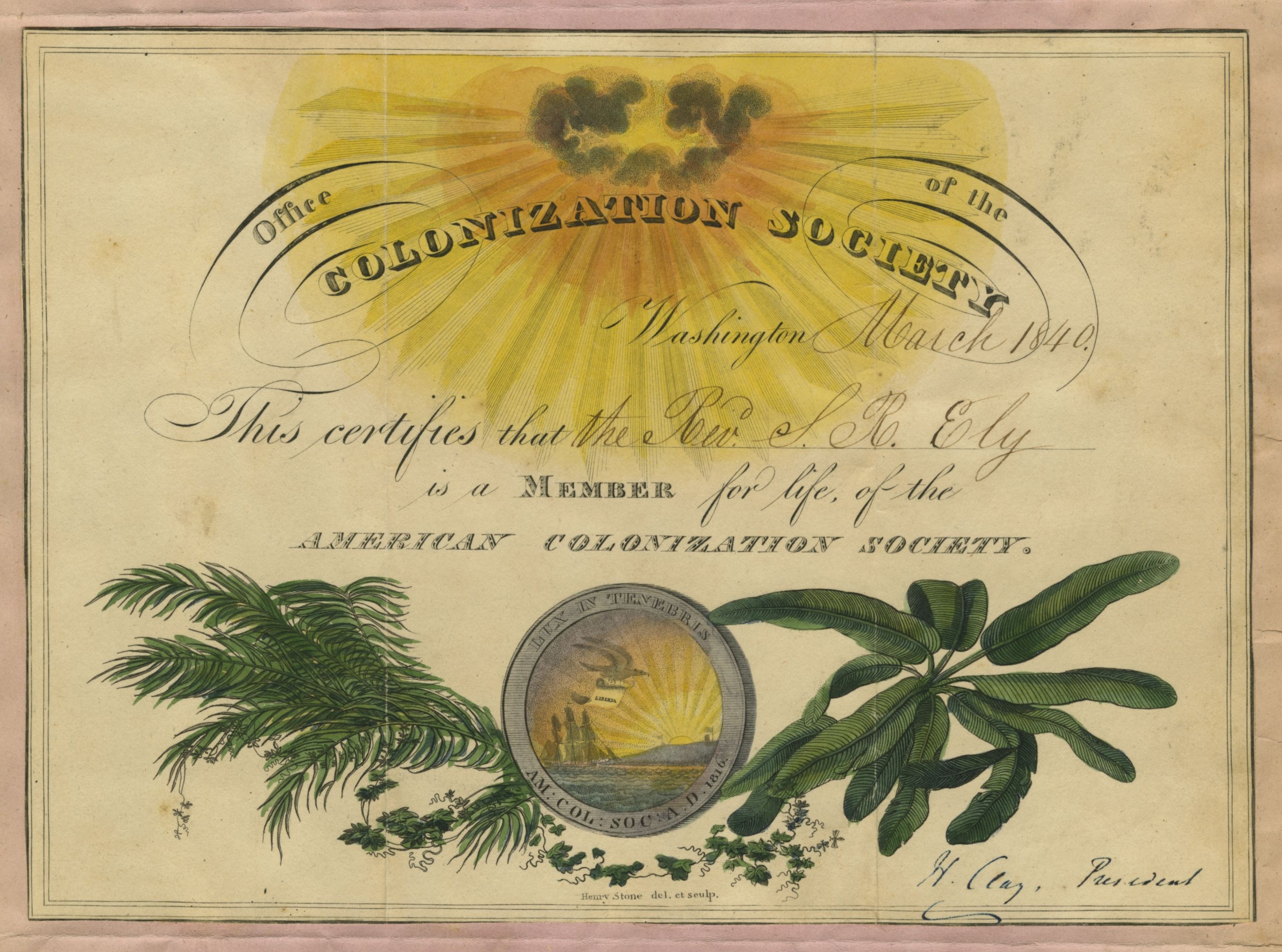
Membership certificate of Rev. Samuel Rose Ely, dated March 1840. Henry Clay's signature as president of the Society is visible at the bottom.

The Society raised money by selling memberships. The Society's members pressured Congress and the President for support. In 1819, they received $100,000 from Congress, and on February 6, 1820, the first ship, the Elizabeth, sailed from New York for West Africa with three white ACS agents and 86 African-American emigrants aboard. The approaches for selecting people and funding travel to Africa varied by state.

== Opposition to colonization ==
According to Benjamin Quarles, the colonization movement "originated abolitionism", by arousing the free Black people and other opponents of slavery.

The following summary by Judge James Hall, editor of the Cincinnati-based Western Monthly Magazine, is from May 1834:

The plan of colonizing free blacks, has been justly considered one of the noblest devices of Christian benevolence and enlightened patriotism, grand in its object, and most happily adapted to enlist the combined influence, and harmonious cooperation, of different classes of society. It reconciles, and brings together some discordant interests, which could not in any other plan be brought to meet in harmony. The Christian and the statesman here act together, and persons having entirely different views from each other in reference to some collateral points connected with the great subject, are moved towards the same point by a diversity of motives. It is a splendid conception, around which are gathered the hopes of the nation, the wishes of the patriot, the prayers of the Christian, and we trust, the approbation of Heaven.

(As Hall refused to publish Theodore Weld's lengthy reply, he did so in the Cincinnati Journal. It became known nationally because Garrison devoted almost the entire front page of the June 14 issue of The Liberator to it.)

=== Opposition from African-Americans ===
From the beginning, "the majority of black Americans regarded the Society [with] enormous disdain", a "fixed hatred". Black activist James Forten immediately rejected the ACS, writing in 1817 that "we have no wish to separate from our present homes for any purpose whatever". As soon as they heard about it, 3,000 black protestors packed a church in Philadelphia, "the bellwether city for free blacks," and "bitterly and unanimously" denounced it. They published a protest pamphlet.

Now—after the Colonization Society has been formed without the consent of the colored people[,] after the enterprise has been violently pushed, against their reiterated protests, tor seventeen years—after its friends acknowledged that coercion has been used in getting away its victims—and so long as they would persuade us that this is not the native country of colored Americans; and that we ought not to let them remain here—what is it better than gross mockery to talk about consent?

Frederick Douglass condemned colonization: "Shame upon the guilty wretches that dare propose, and all that countenance such a proposition. We live here—have lived here—have a right to live here, and mean to live here". Martin Delany, who believed that Black Americans deserved "a new country, a new beginning", called Liberia a "miserable mockery" of an independent republic, a "racist scheme of the ACS to rid the United States of free blacks". He proposed instead Central and South America as "the ultimate destination and future home of the colored race on this continent" (see Linconia). One writer on Connecticut African Americans summarizes the attitude amongst them:

African Americans viewed colonization as a means of defrauding them of the rights of citizenship and a way of tightening the grip of slavery. ...The tragedy was that African Americans began to view their ancestral home with disdain. They dropped the use of "African" in names of their organizations...and used instead [of African American] "The Colored American."

While claiming to aid African Americans, in some cases, to stimulate emigration, it made conditions for them worse. For example, "the Society assumed the task of resuscitating the Ohio Black Codes of 1804 and 1807. ...Between 1,000 and 1,200 free blacks were forced from Cincinnati". A meeting was held in Cincinnati on January 17, 1832, to discuss colonization, which resulted in a series of resolutions. First, they had a right to freedom and equality. They felt honor-bound to protect the country, the "land of their birth", and the Constitution. They were not familiar with Africa, and should have the right to make their own decisions about where they lived. They recommended that if black people wish to leave the United States, they consider Canada or Mexico, where they would have civil rights and a climate that is similar to what they are accustomed to. The United States was large enough to accommodate a colony, and would be much cheaper to implement. They questioned the motives of ACS members who cited Christianity as a reason for removing black people from America. Since there were no attempts to improve the conditions of black people who lived in the United States, it was unlikely that white people would watch out for their interests thousands of miles away.

=== Opposition from whites ===
==== William Lloyd Garrison ====
William Lloyd Garrison began publication of his abolitionist newspaper, The Liberator, in 1831, followed in 1832 by his Thoughts on African Colonization, which discredited the Society. According to President Lincoln, it was "the logic and moral power of Garrison and the antislavery people of the country" that put emancipation on the country's political agenda.

Garrison himself had earlier joined the Society in good faith. All the important white future abolitionists supported the Society: besides Garrison, Gerrit Smith, the Tappans, and many others, as can be seen in the pages of the Society's magazine, the African Repository. Garrison objected to the colonization scheme because rather than eliminating slavery, its key goal, as he saw it, was to remove free black people from America, thereby avoiding slave rebellions. Besides not improving the lot of enslaved Africans, the colonization had made enemies of native people of Africa. Both he and Gerrit Smith were horrified when they learned that alcohol was being sold in Liberia. He questioned the wisdom of sending African Americans, along with white missionaries and agents, to such an unhealthy place. In addition, it meant that fewer slaves achieved their freedom: "it hinders the manumission of slaves by throwing their emancipation upon its own scheme, which in fifteen years has occasioned the manumission of less than four hundred slaves, while before its existence and operations during a less time thousands were set free".

In the second number of The Liberator, Garrison reprinted this commentary from the Boston Statesman,

We were, however, rather surprised to see the proposal of sending the free negroes to Africa as returning them to their native land. It would be as well at least to talk of sending these reverend gentlemen back to England as their native land. The negro is just as much a native here as are these reverend gentlemen themselves.—Here the negro was born, here bred, here are his earliest and pleasantest associations—here is all that binds him to earth and makes life valuable. If the welfare of the negro, and not a new scheme for begging, be really the object in view, we desire the reverend gentlemen to step forward and vindicate the rights of the negroes trampled upon by their brethren in Park Street. If they would really promote the happiness of the negro, let their efforts be directed to raise the oppressed black in the scale of moral elevation here. Let them admit him to more rights in the social world;—but unless they desire to be laughed at by all sincere and thinking men, they had better abandon the Quixotic plan of colonizing the Southern negroes at the cost of the North, until we can free our own borders from poverty, ignorance and distress.

==== Gerrit Smith ====
The philanthropist and public intellectual Gerrit Smith, the wealthiest man in New York State, had been "among the most munificent patrons of this Society," as put by Society Vice-President Henry Clay.

This support changed to furious and bitter rejection when he realized, in the early 1830s, that the society was "quite as much an Anti-Abolition, as Colonization Society". "This Colonization Society had, by an invisible process, half conscious, half unconscious, been transformed into a serviceable organ and member of the Slave Power". It was "an extreme case of sham reform". He claimed that the ACS had "ripened into the unmeasured calumniator of the abolitionist, ...the unblushing defender of the slaveholder, and the deadliest enemy of the colored race". In November 1835, he sent the Society a letter with a check, to conclude his existing commitments, and said there would not be any more from him, because:

The Society is now, and has been for some time, far more interested in the question of slavery, than in the work of Colonization—in the demolition of the Anti-Slavery Society, than in the building up of its Colony. I need not go beyond the matter and spirit of the last few numbers of its periodical for the justification of this remark. Were a stranger to form his opinion by these numbers, it would be, that the Society issuing them was quite as much an Anti-Abolition, as Colonization Society. ...It has come to this, however, that a member of the Colonization Society cannot advocate the deliverance of his enslaved fellow men, without subjecting himself to such charges of inconsistency, as the public prints abundantly cast on me, for being at the same time a member of that Society and an Abolitionist. ...Since the late alarming attacks, in the persons of its members, on the right of discussion, (and astonishing as it is, some of the suggestions for invading this right are impliedly countenanced in the African Repository,) I have looked to it, as being also the rallying point of the friends of this right. To that Society yours is hostile.

In the meeting of forming British African Colonization Society held in London in July 1833, Nathaniel Paul, an abolitionist in support of William Lloyd Garrison's "Thoughts on African Colonization," argued that a significant number of opponents, including Black Americans in prominent cities of America, found inequality towards the Society because according to him, they were the ones who had remarkably contributed and fought to protect this country as their home through a historical period of generations. However, this Society was then trying to forcefully send them back to their ancestors' lands as, by that time, they were considered at risk for rebellion in the name of emancipation. In contrast, the new Europeans who had not been part of this country in such events were instead welcomed to settle here.

== Support of free black emigration ==
From 1850 to 1858, according to Martin Delany, a supporter of African Americans' emigration from the United States to other regions, the creation of a republic was a significant movement to gain independence for the free Black people in America, in contrast to the ideology of staying and fighting for the equality of civil rights of Frederick Douglass. He believed the transition was to exit the rising of slavery and racism toward African Americans in the US. Other destinations he suggested were Central America, the West Indies, or Mexico, where Black people could be more likely to thrive and emphasize their freedom against the influence of White people. Toward this end, in 1858, Delany cofounded the African Civilization Society.

== Colony of Liberia ==
In 1821, Lt. Robert Stockton had pointed a pistol to the head of King Peter, which allowed Stockton to persuade King Peter to sell Cape Montserrado (or Mesurado) and to establish Monrovia. In 1825 and 1826, Jehudi Ashmun, Stockton's successor, took steps to lease, annex, or buy tribal lands in Africa along the coast and along major rivers leading inland in Africa to establish an American colony. Stockton's actions inspired Ashmun to use aggressive tactics in his negotiations with King Peter and in May 1825, King Peter and other native kings agreed to a treaty with Ashmun. The treaty negotiated land to Ashmun and in return, the natives received three barrels of rum, five casks of powder, five umbrellas, ten pairs of shoes, ten iron posts, and 500 bars of tobacco, as well as other items.

Of the 4,571 emigrants who arrived in Liberia between 1820 and 1843, only 1,819—40%—were alive in 1843. The ACS knew of the high death rate, but continued to send more people to the colony.

It is an oversimplication to say simply that the American Colonization Society founded Liberia. Much of what would become Liberia was a collection of settlements sponsored by state colonization societies: Mississippi in Africa, Kentucky in Africa, the Republic of Maryland, and several others. The most developed of these, the Republic of Maryland, had its own constitution, and statutes.

== Publications ==
Beginning in 1825, the Society published the African Repository and Colonial Journal. Ralph Randolph Gurley (1797–1872), who headed the Society until 1844, edited the journal, which in 1850 simplified its title to the African Repository. The journal promoted both colonization and Liberia. Included were articles about Africa, lists of donors, letters of praise, information about emigrants, and official dispatches that espoused the prosperity and continued growth of the colony. After 1919, the society essentially ended, but it did not formally dissolve until 1964, when it transferred its papers to the Library of Congress.

== Civil War and emancipation ==
Early in his presidency, Abraham Lincoln tried repeatedly to arrange resettlement of the kind the ACS supported, but each arrangement failed.

The ACS continued to operate during the American Civil War and colonized 168 black people during the conflict. It sent 2,492 people of African descent to Liberia in the five years following the war. The federal government provided a small amount of support for these operations through the Freedmen's Bureau.

Some scholars believe that Lincoln abandoned the idea by 1863, following the use of black troops. Biographer Stephen B. Oates has observed that Lincoln thought it immoral to ask black soldiers to fight for the U.S. and then to remove them to Africa after their military service. Others, such as the historian Michael Lind, believe that as late as 1864, Lincoln continued to hold out hope for colonization, noting that he allegedly asked Attorney General Edward Bates if the Reverend James Mitchell could stay on as "your assistant or aid in the matter of executing the several acts of Congress relating to the emigration or colonizing of the freed Blacks".

By late into his first term as president, Lincoln had publicly abandoned the idea of colonization after speaking about it with Frederick Douglass, who objected harshly to it. On April 11, 1865, with the war drawing to a close, Lincoln gave a public speech at the White House supporting suffrage for blacks, a speech that led actor John Wilkes Booth, who was vigorously opposed to emancipation and black suffrage, to assassinate him three days later.

== Decline and dissolution ==
Colonizing proved expensive; under the leadership of Henry Clay the ACS spent many years unsuccessfully trying to persuade the U.S. Congress to fund emigration. The ACS did have some success, in the 1850s, with state legislatures, such as those of Virginia, Pennsylvania, and New Jersey. In 1850, the state of Virginia set aside $30,000 (~$899,860 in 2025) annually for five years to aid and support emigration. The Society, in its Thirty-fourth Annual Report, acclaimed the news as "a great Moral demonstration of the propriety and necessity of state action!" During the 1850s, the Society also received several thousand dollars from the New Jersey, Pennsylvania, Missouri, and Maryland legislatures. Pennsylvania, Maryland, and Mississippi set up their own state societies and colonies on the coast next to Liberia. However, the funds that ACS took in were inadequate to meet the Society's stated goals. "For the fourteen years preceding 1834, the receipts of that society, needing millions for its proposed operations, had averaged only about twenty-one thousand dollars a year. It had never obtained the confidence of the American people".

Three of the reasons the movement never became very successful were lack of interest by free black people, opposition by some abolitionists, and the scale and costs of moving many people (there were 4 million freedmen in the South after the Civil War). There were millions of black slaves in the United States, but colonization only transported a few thousand freedmen.

Following the outbreak of the First World War, the ACS sent a cablegram to President Daniel Howard of Liberia, warning him that any involvement in the war could lead to Liberia's territorial integrity being violated regardless of which side might come out on top.

In 1913, and again at its formal dissolution in 1964, the Society donated its records to the U.S. Library of Congress. The donated materials contain a wealth of information about the founding of the society, its role in establishing Liberia, efforts to manage and defend the colony, fundraising, recruitment of settlers, and the way in which black settlers built and led the new nation.

In Liberia, the Society maintained offices at the junction of Ashmun and Buchanan Streets at the heart of Monrovia's commercial district, next to the True Whig Party headquarters in the Edward J. Roye Building. Its offices at the site closed in 1956 when the government demolished all the buildings at the intersection for the purpose of constructing new public buildings there. Nevertheless, the land officially remained the property of the Society into the 1980s, amassing large amounts of back taxes because the Ministry of Finance could not find an address to which to send property tax bills.

== Viewed through the perspective of racism ==
In the 1950s, racism was an increasingly important issue and by the late 1960s and 1970s, it had been forced to the forefront of public consciousness by the civil rights movement. The prevalence of racism invited a re-evaluation of the Society's motives, prompting historians to examine the ACS in terms of racism more than its stance on slavery. By the 1980s and 1990s, historians were going even further in reimagining the ACS. Not only were they focusing on the racist rhetoric of the Society's members and publications, but some of them also depicted the Society as a proslavery organization. Recently however, some scholars have stopped depicting the ACS as a proslavery organization, and some of them have characterized it as an antislavery organization again.

== See also ==
- Back-to-Africa movement
- Linconia
- Remigration
- Abolitionism in the United States
- African Civilization Society
- African Repository and Colonial Journal
- Colonization Societies
- Haitian emigration
  - Samaná Americans
- History of Liberia
- Kentucky in Africa
- Loring D. Dewey, an agent of the ACS who promoted free black people's emigration to Haiti in the 1820s
- Lott Carey, of Richmond, Virginia, the first American missionary to Liberia
- Maryland State Colonization Society
- Mississippi-in-Africa
- Nova Scotian Settlers of the Freetown Colony in what is now Sierra Leone
- Republic of Maryland
- Samuel Wilkeson, in 1838, he became general agent of the Society

== Sources ==
- This article incorporates public domain material from the Library of Congress
- Barton, Seth, "Remarks on the colonization of the western coast of Africa", Cornell University Library, 1850.
- Boley, G.E. Saigbe, "Liberia: The Rise and Fall of the First Republic", Macmillan Publishers, London, 1983.
- Burin, Eric. Slavery and the Peculiar Solution: A History of the American Colonization Society. University Press of Florida, 2005.
- Cassell, Dr. C. Abayomi, "Liberia: History of the First African Republic", Fountainhead Publishers Inc., New York, 1970.
- Egerton, Douglas R. Charles Fenton Mercer and the Trial of National Conservatism. University Press of Mississippi, 1989.
- Finley, Rev. Robert, "Thoughts on the Colonization of Free Blacks" Archived March 4, 2020, at the Wayback Machine, Washington D.C., 1816 (Rev. Finley's founding document).
- Jenkins, David, "Black Zion: The Return of Afro-Americans and West Indians to Africa", Wildwood House, London, 1975.
- Johnson, Charles S., "Bitter Canaan: The Story of the Negro Republic", Transaction Books, New Brunswick, NJ, 1987.
- Liebenow, J. Gus, "Liberia: The Evolution of Privilege", Cornell University Press, Ithaca, NY, 1969.
- Miller, Floyd J., "The Search for a Black Nationality: Black Emigration and Colonization, 1787–1863", University of Illinois Press, Urbana, Illinois, 1975.
- Newman, Richard S, "Freedom's prophet", NYU Press, New York, 2008.
- Oubre, Claude F. Forty Acres and a Mule: The Freedmen's Bureau and Black Land Ownership. Louisiana State University Press, 1978.
- Power-Green, Ousmane, "Against Wind and Tide: The African American Struggle against the Colonization Movement," New York University Press, 2014.
- Thomas, Lamont D. Paul Cuffe: Black Entrepreneur and Pan-Africanist (Urbana and Chicago: University of Illinois Press, 1988)
- Tomek, Beverly C. "Colonization and Its Discontents: Emancipation, Emigration and Antislavery in Antebellum Pennsylvania," (New York: New York University Press, 2011).
- West, Richard, "Back to Africa", Holt, Rinehart, and Winston, Inc., New York, 1970.
- Yarema, Allan E., "American Colonization Society: an avenue to freedom?", University Press of America, 2006.
