= New Jersey Division of Motor Vehicles Building =

- U.S. National Register of Historic Places
- U.S. Historic district – Contributing property
- New Jersey Register of Historic Places
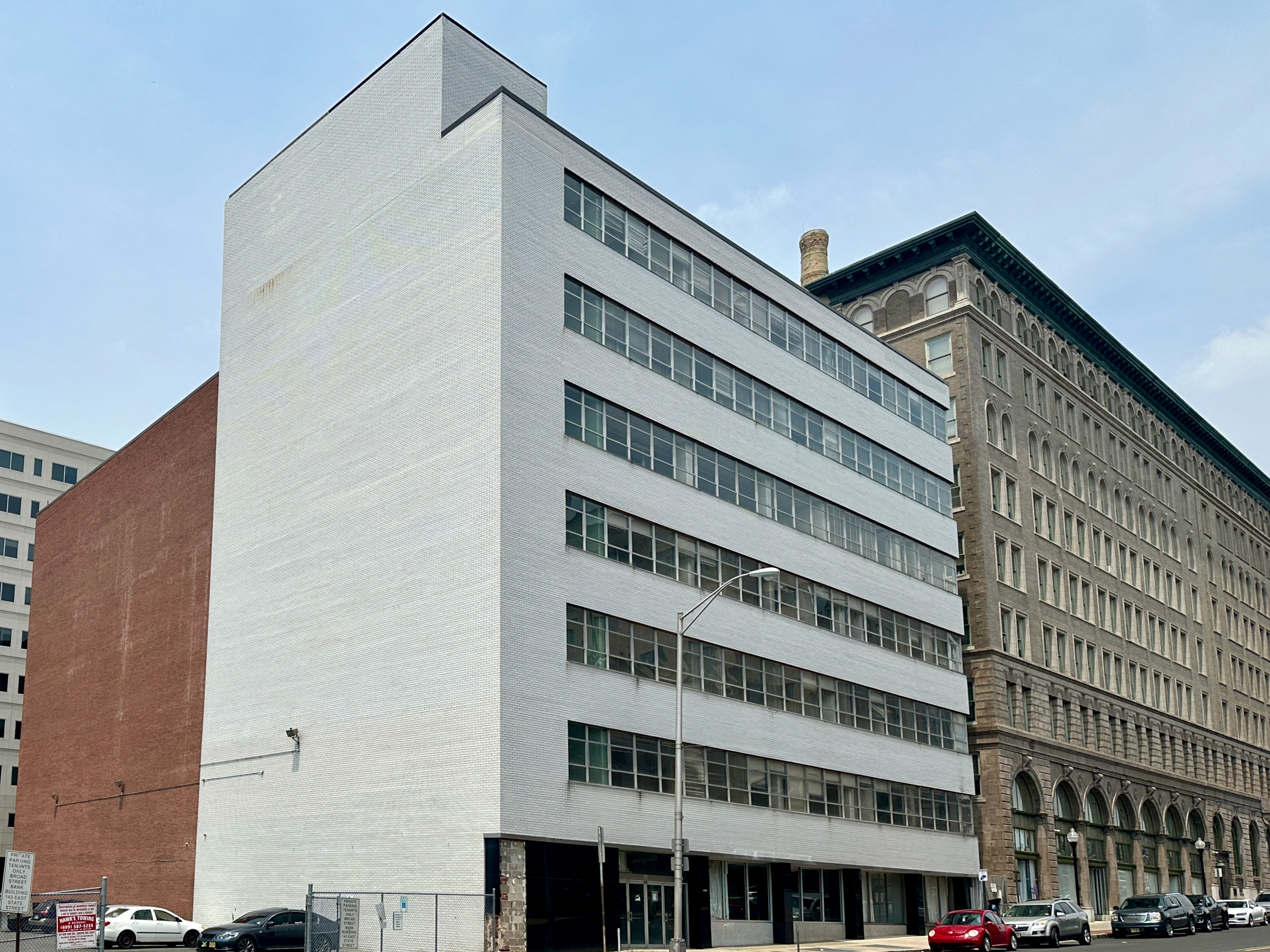
- New Jersey Division of Motor Vehicles Building, next to the Broad Street National Bank

- Location within Mercer County, New Jersey Location within New Jersey Location within the United States
- Location: 25 South Montgomery Street, Trenton, New Jersey
- Coordinates: 40°13′10.2″N 74°45′42.5″W
- Built: 1961
- Built by: Looman Associates
- Architect: Kramer, Hirsch & Carchidi
- Architectural style: International Style
- Part of: Downtown Trenton Commercial Historic District (ID100011495)
- NRHP reference No.: 100008729
- NJRHP No.: 5866

Significant dates
- Added to NRHP: March 20, 2023
- Designated CP: March 10, 2025
- Designated NJRHP: January 13, 2023

The New Jersey Division of Motor Vehicles Building, also known as the Looman Building, is a historic International Style office building located at 25 South Montgomery Street in the city of Trenton in Mercer County, New Jersey, United States. It was designed by the architectural firm Kramer, Hirsch & Carchidi and completed in 1961 by Looman Associates. The building was added to the National Register of Historic Places on March 20, 2023, for its significance in architecture. It was added as a contributing property to the Downtown Trenton Commercial Historic District on March 10, 2025.

== History and description ==
The seven-story building is constructed of structural steel faced with glazed white brick and red brick. On the side facing South Montgomery Street, it features long aluminum ribbon windows. From 1961 to 1993, the sole tenant was the New Jersey Division of Motor Vehicles. It has been unoccupied since then. The Broad Street National Bank, built in 1900 and also listed on the NRHP, is adjacent to the building.

== See also ==
- National Register of Historic Places listings in Mercer County, New Jersey
