= List of moderators of the General Assembly of the Presbyterian Church in the United States of America =

The office of moderator of the General Assembly was the highest elected position in the Presbyterian Church in the United States of America (PCUSA). The moderator was responsible for presiding over the meeting of the General Assembly, which was held annually between 1789 and 1956. After the meeting, which lasted for about a week, the moderator served as an ambassador of the denomination throughout the remainder of the term. After completing the term, most former moderators took on the role of a church statesman.

== Prior to the Old School–New School controversy ==
The chart below shows the moderators and place of meetings from 1789 when the PCUSA was formed, until 1837, after which the denomination was divided into two factions by the Old School–New School Controversy until 1869.

Number and year	Place of meeting	Moderator	Online minutes
Convened the 1st GA, 1789	Philadelphia, Pennsylvania	Rev. John Witherspoon	Minutes of the 1789 General Assembly
1st GA, 1789	Philadelphia, Pennsylvania	Rev. John Rodgers	Minutes of the 1789 General Assembly
2nd GA, 1790	Philadelphia, Pennsylvania	Rev. Robert Smith	Minutes of the 1790 General Assembly
3rd GA, 1791	Philadelphia, Pennsylvania	Rev. John Woodhull	Minutes of the 1791 General Assembly
4th GA, 1792	Carlisle, Pennsylvania	Rev. John King	Minutes of the 1792 General Assembly
5th GA, 1793	Philadelphia, Pennsylvania	Rev. James Latta	Minutes of the 1793 General Assembly
6th GA, 1794	Philadelphia, Pennsylvania	Rev. Alexander McWhorter	Minutes of the 1794 General Assembly
7th GA, 1795	Carlisle, Pennsylvania	Rev. John McKnight	Minutes of the 1795 General Assembly
8th GA, 1796	Philadelphia, Pennsylvania	Rev. Robert Davidson	Minutes of the 1796 General Assembly
9th GA, 1797	Philadelphia, Pennsylvania	Rev. William Mackay Tennent	Minutes of the 1797 General Assembly
10th GA, 1798	Philadelphia, Pennsylvania	Rev. John Blair Smith	Minutes of the 1798 General Assembly
11th GA, 1799	Winchester, Virginia	Rev. Samuel Stanhope Smith	Minutes of the 1799 General Assembly
12th GA, 1800	Philadelphia, Pennsylvania	Rev. Joseph Clark	Minutes of the 1800 General Assembly
13th GA, 1801	Philadelphia, Pennsylvania	Rev. Nathaniel Irwin	Minutes of the 1801 General Assembly
14th GA, 1802	Philadelphia, Pennsylvania	Rev. Azel Roe	Minutes of the 1802 General Assembly
15th GA, 1803	Philadelphia, Pennsylvania	Rev. James Hall	Minutes of the 1803 General Assembly
16th GA, 1804	Philadelphia, Pennsylvania	Rev. James Francis Armstrong	Minutes of the 1804 General Assembly
17th GA, 1805	Philadelphia, Pennsylvania	Rev. James Richards	Minutes of the 1805 General Assembly
18th GA, 1806	Philadelphia, Pennsylvania	Rev. Samuel Miller	Minutes of the 1806 General Assembly
19th GA, 1807	Philadelphia, Pennsylvania	Rev. Archibald Alexander	Minutes of the 1807 General Assembly
20th GA, 1808	Philadelphia, Pennsylvania	Rev. Philip Milledoler	Minutes of the 1808 General Assembly
21st GA, 1809	Philadelphia, Pennsylvania	Rev. Drury Lacy	Minutes of the 1809 General Assembly
22nd GA, 1810	Philadelphia, Pennsylvania	Rev. John Brodhead Romeyn	Minutes of the 1810 General Assembly
23rd GA, 1811	Philadelphia, Pennsylvania	Rev. Eliphalet Nott	Minutes of the 1811 General Assembly
24th GA, 1812	Philadelphia, Pennsylvania	Rev. Andrew Flinn	Minutes of the 1812 General Assembly
25th GA, 1813	Philadelphia, Pennsylvania	Rev. Samuel Blatchford	Minutes of the 1813 General Assembly
26th GA, 1814	Philadelphia, Pennsylvania	Rev. James Inglis	Minutes of the 1814 General Assembly
27th GA, 1815	Philadelphia, Pennsylvania	Rev. William Neill	Minutes of the 1815 General Assembly
28th GA, 1816	Philadelphia, Pennsylvania	Rev. James Blythe	Minutes of the 1816 General Assembly
29th GA, 1817	Philadelphia, Pennsylvania	Rev. Jonas Coe	Minutes of the 1817 General Assembly
30th GA, 1818	Philadelphia, Pennsylvania	Rev. Jacob Jones Janeway	Minutes of the 1818 General Assembly
31st GA, 1819	Philadelphia, Pennsylvania	Rev. John Holt Rice	Minutes of the 1819 General Assembly
32nd GA, 1820	Philadelphia, Pennsylvania	Rev. John McDowell	Minutes of the 1820 General Assembly
33rd GA, 1821	Philadelphia, Pennsylvania	Rev. William Hill	Minutes of the 1821 General Assembly
34th GA, 1822	Philadelphia, Pennsylvania	Rev. Obadiah Jennings	Minutes of the 1822 General Assembly
35th GA, 1823	Philadelphia, Pennsylvania	Rev. John Chester	Minutes of the 1823 General Assembly
36th GA, 1824	Philadelphia, Pennsylvania	Rev. Ashbel Green	Minutes of the 1824 General Assembly
37th GA, 1825	Philadelphia, Pennsylvania	Rev. Stephen N. Rowan	Minutes of the 1825 General Assembly
38th GA, 1826	Philadelphia, Pennsylvania	Rev. Thomas McAuley	Minutes of the 1826 General Assembly
39th GA, 1827	Philadelphia, Pennsylvania	Rev. Francis Herron	Minutes of the 1827 General Assembly
40th GA, 1828	Philadelphia, Pennsylvania	Rev. Ezra Stiles Ely	Minutes of the 1828 General Assembly
41st GA, 1829	Philadelphia, Pennsylvania	Rev. Benjamin Holt Rice	Minutes of the 1829 General Assembly
42nd GA, 1830	Philadelphia, Pennsylvania	Rev. Ezra Fisk	Minutes of the 1830 General Assembly
43rd GA, 1831	Philadelphia, Pennsylvania	Rev. Nathan S.S. Beman	Minutes of the 1831 General Assembly
44th GA, 1832	Philadelphia, Pennsylvania	Rev. James Hoge	Minutes of the 1832 General Assembly
45th GA, 1833	Philadelphia, Pennsylvania	Rev. William Anderson McDowell	Minutes of the 1833 General Assembly
46th GA, 1834	Philadelphia, Pennsylvania	Rev. Philip Lindsley	Minutes of the 1834 General Assembly
47th GA, 1835	Pittsburgh, Pennsylvania	Rev. William Wirt Phillips	Minutes of the 1835 General Assembly
48th GA, 1836	Pittsburgh, Pennsylvania	Rev. John Witherspoon	Minutes of the 1836 General Assembly
49th GA, 1837	Philadelphia, Pennsylvania	Rev. David Elliott	Minutes of the 1837 General Assembly

== Old School ==
The chart below shows the moderators, and the place of meetings, of the Old School branch from 1838 until 1869, after which the two branches reunited into one denomination.

Number and year	Place of meeting	Moderator	Online minutes
50th GA, 1838	Philadelphia, Pennsylvania	Rev. William Swan Plumer	Minutes of the 1838 General Assembly
51st GA, 1839	Philadelphia, Pennsylvania	Rev. Joshua Lacy Wilson	Minutes of the 1839 General Assembly
52nd GA, 1840	Philadelphia, Pennsylvania	Rev. William Morrison Engles	Minutes of the 1840 General Assembly
53rd GA, 1841	Philadelphia, Pennsylvania	Rev. Robert Jefferson Breckinridge	Minutes of the 1841 General Assembly
54th GA, 1842	Philadelphia, Pennsylvania	Rev. John Todd Edgar	Minutes of the 1842 General Assembly
55th GA, 1843	Philadelphia, Pennsylvania	Rev. Gardiner Spring	Minutes of the 1843 General Assembly
56th GA, 1844	Louisville, Kentucky	Rev. George Junkin	Minutes of the 1844 General Assembly
57th GA, 1845	Cincinnati, Ohio	Rev. John Michael Krebs	Minutes of the 1845 General Assembly
58th GA, 1846	Philadelphia, Pennsylvania	Rev. Charles Hodge	Minutes of the 1846 General Assembly
59th GA, 1847	Richmond, Virginia	Rev. James Henley Thornwell	Minutes of the 1847 General Assembly
60th GA, 1848	Baltimore, Maryland	Rev. Alexander T. McGill	Minutes not available online
61st GA, 1849	Pittsburgh, Pennsylvania	Rev. Nicholas Murray	Minutes not available online
62nd GA, 1850	Cincinnati, Ohio	Rev. Aaron W. Leland	Minutes of the 1850 General Assembly
63rd GA, 1851	St. Louis, Missouri	Rev. Edward P. Humphrey	Minutes of the 1851 General Assembly
64th GA, 1852	Charleston, South Carolina	Rev. John Chase Lord	Minutes of the 1852 General Assembly
65th GA, 1853	Philadelphia, Pennsylvania	Rev. John Clarke Young	Minutes of the 1853 General Assembly
66th GA, 1854	Buffalo, New York	Rev. Henry Augustus Boardman	Minutes of the 1854 General Assembly
67th GA, 1855	Nashville, Tennessee	Rev. Nathan Lewis Rice	Minutes of the 1855 General Assembly
68th GA, 1856	New York, New York	Rev. Francis McFarland	Minutes of the 1856 General Assembly
69th GA, 1857	Lexington, Kentucky	Rev. Cortlandt Van Rensselaer	Minutes of the 1857 General Assembly
70th GA, 1858	New Orleans, Louisiana	Rev. William Anderson Scott	Minutes of the 1858 General Assembly
71st GA, 1859	Indianapolis, Indiana	Rev. William L. Breckinridge	Minutes of the 1859 General Assembly
72nd GA, 1860	Rochester, New York	Rev. John William Yeomans	Minutes of the 1860 General Assembly
73rd GA, 1861	Philadelphia, Pennsylvania	Rev. John Chester Backus	Minutes of the 1861 General Assembly
74th GA, 1862	Columbus, Ohio	Rev. Charles Clinton Beatty	Minutes of the 1862 General Assembly
75th GA, 1863	Peoria, Illinois	Rev. John Hunter Morrison	Minutes of the 1863 General Assembly
76th GA, 1864	Newark, New Jersey	Rev.James Wood	Minutes of the 1864 General Assembly
77th GA, 1865	Pittsburgh, Pennsylvania	Rev. John Cameron Lowrie	Minutes of the 1865 General Assembly
78th GA, 1866	St. Louis, Missouri	Rev. Robert L. Stanton	Minutes of the 1866 General Assembly
79th GA, 1867	Cincinnati, Ohio	Rev. Phineas Densmore Gurley	Minutes of the 1867 General Assembly
80th GA, 1868	Albany, New York	Rev. George W. Musgrave	Minutes of the 1868 General Assembly
81st GA, 1869	New York, New York	Rev. M. W. Jocobus	Minutes of the 1869 General Assembly

== New School ==
The chart below shows the moderators, and the place of meetings, of the New School branch from 1838 until 1869, after which the two branches reunited into one denomination.

Number and year	Place of meeting	Moderator	Online minutes
50th GA, 1838	Philadelphia, Pennsylvania	Rev. Samuel Fisher	Minutes of the 1838 General Assembly
51st GA, 1839	Philadelphia, Pennsylvania	Rev. Baxter Dickinson	Minutes of the 1839 General Assembly
52nd GA, 1840	Philadelphia, Pennsylvania	Rev. William Wisner	Minutes of the 1840 General Assembly
53rd GA, 1843	Philadelphia, Pennsylvania	Rev. Ansel Doan Eddy	Minutes of the 1843 General Assembly
54th GA, 1846	Philadelphia, Pennsylvania	Rev. Samuel Hanson Cox	Minutes of the 1846 General Assembly
55th GA, 1847	Cincinnati, Ohio	Rev. Samuel Hanson Cox	Minutes of the 1847 General Assembly
56th GA, 1849	Philadelphia, Pennsylvania	Rev. Philip Courtlandt Hay	Minutes of the 1849 General Assembly
57th GA, 1850	Detroit, Michigan	Rev. David H. Riddle	Minutes of the 1850 General Assembly
58th GA, 1851	Utica, New York	Rev. Albert Barnes	Minutes of the 1851 General Assembly
59th GA, 1852	Washington, D.C.	Rev. William Adams	Minutes of the 1852 General Assembly
60th GA, 1853	Buffalo, New York	Rev. Diarca Howe Allen	Minutes of the 1853 General Assembly
61st GA, 1854	Philadelphia, Pennsylvania	Rev. Thomas H. Skinner	Minutes of the 1854 General Assembly
62nd GA, 1855	St. Louis, Missouri	Rev. William Carpenter Wisner	Minutes of the 1855 General Assembly
63rd GA, 1856	New York, New York	Rev. Laurens Perseus Hickok	Minutes of the 1856 General Assembly
64th GA, 1857	Cleveland, Ohio	Rev. Samuel W. Fisher	Minutes of the 1857 General Assembly
65th GA, 1858	Chicago, Illinois	Rev. Matthew L. P. Thompson	Minutes of the 1858 General Assembly
66th GA, 1859	Wilmington, Delaware	Rev. Robert Wilson Patterson	Minutes of the 1859 General Assembly
67th GA, 1860	Pittsburgh, Pennsylvania	Rev. Thornton Anthony Mills	Minutes of the 1860 General Assembly
68th GA, 1861	Syracuse, New York	Rev. Jonathan Bailey Condit	Minutes of the 1861 General Assembly
69th GA, 1862	Cincinnati, Ohio	Rev. George Duffield	Minutes of the 1862 General Assembly
70th GA, 1863	Philadelphia, Pennsylvania	Rev. Henry B. Smith	Minutes of the 1863 General Assembly
71st GA, 1864	Dayton, Ohio	Rev. Thomas Brainerd	Minutes of the 1864 General Assembly
72nd GA, 1865	Brooklyn, New York	Rev. James Boylan Shaw	Minutes of the 1865 General Assembly
73rd GA, 1866	St. Louis, Missouri	Rev. Samuel Miles Hopkins	Minutes of the 1866 General Assembly
74th GA, 1867	Rochester, New York	Rev. Henry Addison Nelson	Minutes of the 1867 General Assembly
75th GA, 1868	Harrisburg, Pennsylvania	Rev. Jonathan French Stearns	Minutes of the 1868 General Assembly
76th GA, 1869	New York, New York	Rev. Philemon Halsted Fowler	Minutes of the 1869 General Assembly

== Reunited Old and New Schools ==
The chart below shows the moderators, and the place of meetings 1870 when the Old and New Schools had reunited until 1958 when the PCUSA merged with the United Presbyterian Church of North America (UPCNA) to form the United Presbyterian Church in the United States of America.

Number and year	Place of meeting	Moderator	Online minutes
82nd GA, 1870	Philadelphia, Pennsylvania	J. Trumbull Backus	Minutes of the 1870 General Assembly
83rd GA, 1871	Chicago, Illinois	Zephaniah Moore Humphrey	Minutes of the 1871 General Assembly
84th GA, 1872	Detroit, Michigan	Samuel J. Niccolls	Minutes of the 1872 General Assembly
85th GA, 1873	Baltimore, Maryland	Howard Crosby	Minutes of the 1873 General Assembly
86th GA, 1874	St. Louis, Missouri	Samuel J. Wilson	Minutes of the 1874 General Assembly
87th GA, 1875	Cleveland, Ohio	Edward D. Morris	Minutes of the 1875 General Assembly
88th GA, 1876	Brooklyn, New York	Henry Jackson Van Dyke	Minutes of the 1876 General Assembly
89th GA, 1877	Chicago, Illinois	James Eells	Minutes not available online
90th GA, 1878	Pittsburgh, Pennsylvania	Francis Landey Patton	Minutes of the 1878 General Assembly
91st GA, 1879	Saratoga, New York	Henry Harris Jessup	Minutes of the 1879 General Assembly
92nd GA, 1880	Madison, Wisconsin	William M. Paxton	Minutes of the 1880 General Assembly
93rd GA, 1881	Buffalo, New York	Henry Darling	Minutes of the 1881 General Assembly
94th GA, 1882	Springfield, Illinois	Herrick Johnson	Minutes of the 1882 General Assembly
95th GA, 1883	Saratoga, New York	Edwin Francis Hatfield	Minutes of the 1883 General Assembly
96th GA, 1884	Saratoga, New York	George P. Hays	Minutes of the 1884 General Assembly
97th GA, 1885	Cincinnati, Ohio	Elijah R. Craven	Minutes of the 1885 General Assembly
98th GA, 1886	Minneapolis, Minnesota	David C. Marquis	Minutes of the 1886 General Assembly
99th GA, 1887	Omaha, Nebraska	Joseph T. Smith	Minutes of the 1887 General Assembly
100th GA, 1888	Philadelphia, Pennsylvania	Charles L. Thompson	Minutes of the 1888 General Assembly
101st GA, 1889	New York, New York	William C. Roberts	Minutes of the 1889 General Assembly
102nd GA, 1890	Saratoga, New York	William Eves Moore	Minutes of the 1890 General Assembly
103rd GA, 1891	Detroit, Michigan	W. Henry Green	Minutes of the 1891 General Assembly
104th GA, 1892	Portland, Oregon	William C. Young	Minutes of the 1892 General Assembly
105th GA, 1893	Washington, D.C.	Willis Greer Craig	Minutes not available online
106th GA, 1894	Saratoga, New York	S.A. Mutchmore	Minutes of the 1894 General Assembly
107th GA, 1895	Pittsburgh, Pennsylvania	Robert Russell Booth	Minutes of the 1895 General Assembly
108th GA, 1896	Saratoga, New York	John Lindsay Withrow	Minutes of the 1896 General Assembly
109th GA, 1897	Winona Lake, Indiana	Sheldon Jackson	Minutes of the 1897 General Assembly
110th GA, 1898	Winona Lake, Indiana	Wallace Radcliffe	Minutes of the 1898 General Assembly
111th GA, 1899	Minneapolis, Minnesota	Robert F. Sample	Minutes of the 1899 General Assembly
112th GA, 1900	St. Louis, Missouri	Charles A. Dickey	Minutes of the 1900 General Assembly
113th GA, 1901	Philadelphia, Pennsylvania	Henry Collin Minton	Minutes of the 1901 General Assembly
114th GA, 1902	New York, New York	Henry van Dyke	Minutes of the 1902 General Assembly
115th GA, 1903	Los Angeles, California	Robert F. Coyle	Minutes of the 1903 General Assembly
116th GA, 1904	Buffalo, New York	J. Addison Henry	Minutes of the 1904 General Assembly
117th GA, 1905	Winona Lake, Indiana	James D. Moffat	Minutes of the 1905 General Assembly
118th GA, 1906	Des Moines, Iowa	Hunter Corbett	Minutes of the 1906 General Assembly
119th GA, 1907	Columbus, Ohio	William H. Roberts	Minutes of the 1907 General Assembly
120th GA, 1908	Kansas City, Missouri	Baxter P. Fullerton	Minutes of the 1908 General Assembly
121st GA, 1909	Denver, Colorado	James M. Barkley	Minutes of the 1909 General Assembly
122nd GA, 1910	Atlantic City, New Jersey	Charles Little	Minutes of the 1910 General Assembly
123rd GA, 1911	Atlantic City, New Jersey	John F. Carson	Minutes of the 1911 General Assembly
124th GA, 1912	Louisville, Kentucky	Mark A. Matthews	Minutes of the 1912 General Assembly
125th GA, 1913	Atlanta, Georgia	John Timothy Stone	Minutes of the 1913 General Assembly
126th GA, 1914	Chicago, Illinois	Maitland Alexander	Minutes of the 1914 General Assembly
127th GA, 1915	Rochester, New York	J. Ross Stevenson	Minutes of the 1915 General Assembly
128th GA, 1916	Atlantic City, New Jersey	John Abner Marquis	Minutes of the 1916 General Assembly
129th GA, 1917	Dallas, Texas	J. Wilbur Chapman	Minutes of the 1917 General Assembly
130th GA, 1918	Columbus, Ohio	J. Frank Smith	Minutes of the 1918 General Assembly
131st GA, 1919	St. Louis, Missouri	Elder John Willis Baer	Minutes of the 1919 General Assembly
132nd GA, 1920	Philadelphia, Pennsylvania	Samuel S. Palmer	Minutes of the 1920 General Assembly
133rd GA, 1921	Winona Lake, Indiana	Henry C. Swearingen	Minutes of the 1921 General Assembly
134th GA, 1922	Des Moines, Iowa	Calvin C. Hays	Minutes of the 1922 General Assembly
135th GA, 1923	Indianapolis, Indiana	Charles F. Wishart	Minutes not available online
136th GA, 1924	Grand Rapids, Michigan	Clarence Edward Macartney	Minutes not available online
137th GA, 1925	Columbus, Ohio	Charles R. Erdman	Minutes not available online
138th GA, 1926	Baltimore, Maryland	William Oxley Thompson	Minutes not available online
139th GA, 1927	San Francisco, California	Elder Robert Elliott Speer	Minutes not available online
140th GA, 1928	Tulsa, Oklahoma	Hugh Kelso Walker	Minutes not available online
141st GA, 1929	St. Paul, Minnesota	Cleland Boyd McAfee	Minutes not available online
142nd GA, 1930	Cincinnati, Ohio	Hugh Thomson Kerr	Minutes not available online
143rd GA, 1931	Pittsburgh, Pennsylvania	Lewis Seymour Mudge	Minutes not available online
144th GA, 1932	Denver, Colorado	Charles William Kerr	Minutes not available online
145th GA, 1933	Columbus, Ohio	John McDowell	Minutes not available online
146th GA, 1934	Cleveland, Ohio	William Chalmers Covert	Minutes not available online
147th GA, 1935	Cincinnati, Ohio	Joseph Anderson Vance	Minutes not available online
148th GA, 1936	Syracuse, New York	Henry Buck Master	Minutes not available online
149th GA, 1937	Columbus, Ohio	William Hiram Foulkes	Minutes not available online
150th GA, 1938	Philadelphia, Pennsylvania	Charles Whitefield Welch	Minutes not available online
151st GA, 1939	Cleveland, Ohio	Elder Sam Higginbottom	Minutes not available online
152nd GA, 1940	Rochester, New York	William Lindsay Young	Minutes not available online
153rd GA, 1941	St. Louis, Missouri	Herbert Booth Smith	Minutes not available online
154th GA, 1942	Milwaukee, Wisconsin	Stuart Nye Hutchison	Minutes not available online
155th GA, 1943	Detroit, Michigan	Henry Sloane Coffin	Minutes not available online
156th GA, 1944	Chicago, Illinois	Roy Ewing Vale	Minutes not available online
157th GA, 1945	Minneapolis, Minnesota	William Blakeman Lampe	Minutes not available online
158th GA, 1946	Atlantic City, New Jersey	Frederick W. Evans	Minutes not available online
159th GA, 1947	Grand Rapids, Michigan	Elder Wilbur LaRoe, Jr.	Minutes not available online
160th GA, 1948	Seattle, Washington	Jese Hays Baird	Minutes not available online
161st GA, 1949	Buffalo, New York	Clifford E. Barbour	Minutes not available online
162nd GA, 1950	Cincinnati, Ohio	Hugh Ivans Evans	Minutes not available online
163rd GA, 1951	Cincinnati, Ohio	H. Ray Anderson	Minutes not available online
164th GA, 1952	New York, New York	Hermann Nelson Morse	Minutes not available online
165th GA, 1953	Minneapolis, Minnesota	John Alexander Mackay	Minutes not available online
166th GA, 1954	Detroit, Michigan	Ralph Waldo Lloyd	Minutes not available online
167th GA, 1955	Los Angeles, California	Paul S. Wright	Minutes not available online
168th GA, 1956	Philadelphia, Pennsylvania	Elder David W. Proffitt	Minutes not available online
169th GA, 1957	Omaha, Nebraska	Harold R. Martin	Minutes not available online
170th GA, 1958	Pittsburgh, Pennsylvania	Harold R. Martin	Minutes not available online

== See also ==
- List of moderators of the General Assembly of the Presbyterian Church (USA)
