= Henry Minton =

Henry Minton may refer to:

- Henry A. Minton (1883–1948), American architect
- Henry Collin Minton (1855–1924), American theologian
- Henry McKee Minton (1870–1946), African-American doctor
- Henry Minton, American saxophonist, founder of Minton's Playhouse
