= John Blair Smith =

American Presbyterian minister and educator

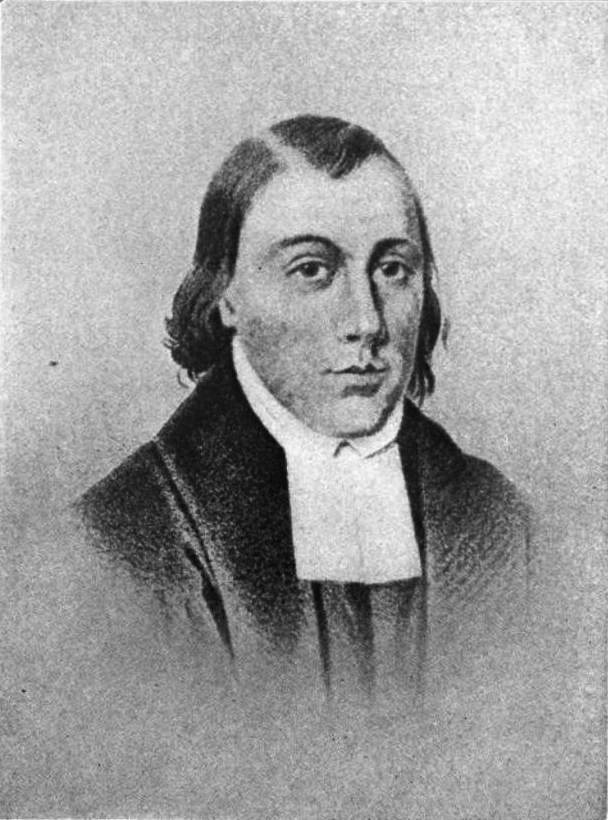

2nd President of Hampden–Sydney College
- In office 1779–1789
- Preceded by: Samuel Stanhope Smith
- Succeeded by: Drury Lacy (Acting)

1st President of Union College
- In office 1795–1799
- Succeeded by: Jonathan Edwards

Personal details
- Born: June 12, 1756 Pequea, Province of Pennsylvania
- Died: August 22, 1799 (aged 43) Philadelphia
- Education: B.A. Princeton University

John Blair Smith (June 12, 1756 – August 22, 1799) was born in Pequea, Pennsylvania Colony, the son of the Rev. Robert Smith, who ran a celebrated academy there. Like his older brother, John Blair Smith was valedictorian of the Class of 1773 at the College of New Jersey, now Princeton University. He was in the graduating class of 1771, with William Graham, the rector of Liberty Hall Academy (now Washington & Lee University) and Henry "Light Horse" Lee, governor of Virginia and father of Robert E. Lee. He was recruited at the age of 19 to come to Virginia as a tutor at the new Hampden–Sydney College, then being founded by his elder brother, Rev. Samuel Stanhope Smith.

While a tutor at the College, John Blair Smith was chosen in 1777 as a captain of a company of students (about sixty-five total) during the American Revolutionary War, assigned to the defense of Williamsburg.

In 1779 Samuel Stanhope Smith resigned his presidency and the pastorates of his churches, in order to answer a call to be president of the College of New Jersey. The younger Smith, who was ordained and elected president of Hampden–Sydney on the same day his brother resigned, managed to revive the flagging enterprise, and, with the assistance of Trustee Patrick Henry, then Governor of Virginia, persuaded the General Assembly of Virginia to grant a charter in 1783 – bestowing the power to grant degrees and establish a self-perpetuating Board. Smith was also pastor in Cumberland and Briery, as these positions were part of the college presidency. At Hampden-Sydney, Smith also added the theology school.

John Blair Smith resigned in 1789, after being pressured by trustee Patrick Henry, whose position on ratifying the constitution Blair Smith had written a dissention of. He accepted a position as pastor to the Old Pine Street Church in Philadelphia. Four years later he was elected the first president of Union College in Schenectady, New York. Eight months after returning to his pastorate in Philadelphia in 1799, he died there in a yellow fever epidemic.

Academic offices
Preceded by Samuel Stanhope Smith	President of Hampden–Sydney College; 1779—1789	Succeeded by Drury Lacy
Religious titles
Preceded by Rev. William MacKay Tennant	Moderator of the 10th General Assembly of the Presbyterian Church in the United States of America; 1798–1799	Succeeded by Rev. Samuel Stanhope Smith
