= Samuel Stanhope Smith =

7th President of Princeton (1751–1819)

The Reverend Samuel Stanhope Smith
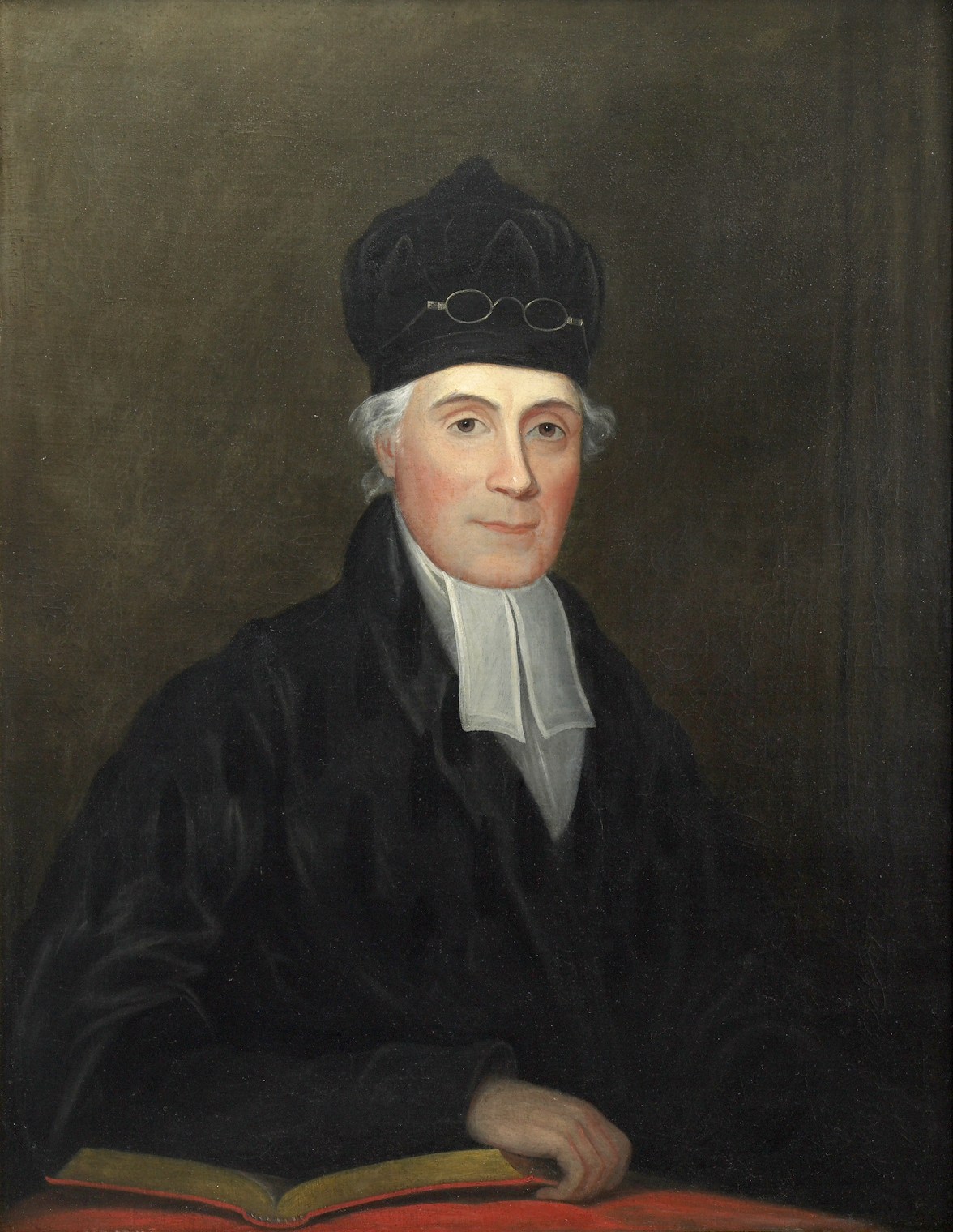
- Charles B. Lawrence, Samuel Stanhope Smith (1750–1819), Class of 1769, President (1795–1812), Princeton University Art Museum

7th President of Princeton University
- In office 1795–1812
- Preceded by: John Witherspoon
- Succeeded by: Ashbel Green

1st President of Hampden–Sydney College
- In office 1775–1779
- Preceded by: Inaugural holder
- Succeeded by: John Blair Smith

Personal details
- Born: March 15, 1751 Pequea, Province of Pennsylvania
- Died: August 21, 1819 (aged 68) Princeton, New Jersey, U.S.
- Spouse: Ann Witherspoon (m. 1775; died 1817)
- Education: B.A. Princeton University; D.D. Yale University; LL.D. Harvard University

Samuel Stanhope Smith (March 15, 1751 – August 21, 1819) was a Presbyterian minister, founding president of Hampden–Sydney College and the seventh president of the College of New Jersey (now Princeton University) from 1795 to 1812. His stormy career ended in his forced resignation. His words – "If reason and charity cannot promote the cause of truth and piety, I cannot see how it should ever flourish under the withering fires of wrath and strife" – epitomize his career.

== Early life ==
Smith was born in Pequea, Pennsylvania, on March 15, 1751. He was the son of Robert Smith (1723–1793) and Elizabeth (née Blair) Smith (1725–1777). In 1769, he graduated as a salutatorian from the College of New Jersey (name later changed to Princeton University), and went on to study theology and philosophy under John Witherspoon.

== Career ==
In his mid-twenties, he worked as a missionary in Virginia, and from 1775 to 1779, he served as the founder and rector of Hampden–Sydney College, which he referred to in his advertisement of 1 September 1775 as "an Academy in Prince Edward." The school, not then named, was always intended to be a college-level institution; later in the same advertisement, Smith explicitly likens its curriculum to that of the College of New Jersey. "Academy" was a technical term used for college-level schools not run by the established church. Stanhope Smith held honorary doctorates from Yale and Harvard and in 1785, was elected a member of the American Philosophical Society.

=== President of Princeton ===
Smith studied under president Witherspoon and returned to Princeton as a professor in 1779, and succeeded Witherspoon as president in 1795. The situation during the winter semester of 1806–07 under Smith's presidency was characterized by little or no faculty-student rapport or communication, crowded conditions, and strict school rules — a combination that led to a student riot on 31 March–1 April 1807. College authorities denounced it as a sign of moral decay. Smith was active in the affairs of the Presbyterian Church and served as moderator of the 11th General Assembly in 1799. Smith was an urbane and cultivated man who sought, in the tradition of Witherspoon, to maintain orthodoxy while opposing tendencies toward rigidity and obscurantism. His efforts were unsuccessful, and he was forced to resign from his office in 1812 as a result of criticism from within the church. In his efforts to reconcile reason and revelation Smith left himself vulnerable to charges of rationalism and Arminianism.

=== Theories ===
Smith was the first systematic expositor of Scottish Common Sense Realism in America. An empiricist in his anthropology and a Lamarckian before Lamarck, he sought to mediate between science and religious orthodoxy.

In his work, Stanhope Smith expressed progressive views on marriage and egalitarian ideas about race and slavery. The second edition of his Essay on the Causes of Variety of Complexion and Figure in the Human Species (1810) became important as a powerful argument against the increasing racism of 19th-century ethnology. He opposed the racial classifications of naturalists such as Johann Friedrich Blumenbach, Georges-Louis Leclerc, Comte de Buffon, and Carl Linnaeus. In this text, his attempt to explain the variety of physical appearances among humans involved a strongly environmental outlook. An example he provides involves "the blacks in the southern states." Smith noted that field slaves had darker skin pigmentation and other "African" features than did domestic slaves, and claimed that exposure to white, European culture through their "civilized" masters had changed their anatomy as well.

In Smith's essay titled Essay on the Causes of Variety of Complexion and Figure in the Human Species, Smith claimed that Negro pigmentation was nothing more than a huge freckle that covered the whole body as a result of an oversupply of bile, which was caused by tropical climates. In this essay Smith described the basic concept of sexual selection, this was before Charles Darwin later popularized the theory.

Smith is also known for his attempt to refute Thomas Jefferson's claim in Notes on the State of Virginia that there were no great black writers or artists. In it, he attacked Jefferson's disregard of poetic abilities of Phillis Wheatley.

Noah Webster cited Stanhope Smith in Webster's 1828 Dictionary in the definition of philosophy. The citation was from Stanhope Smith's second edition of his Essay on the Causes of Variety of Complexion and Figure in the Human Species (1810). The quote as given, "True religion, and true philosophy must ultimately arrive at the same principle."

== Personal life ==
On June 28, 1775, Smith was married to Ann Witherspoon (1749–1817), the daughter of his mentor and predecessor President. Together, they were the parents of:

- Elizabeth Smith, who married John Marsden Pristard.
- Frances Ann Smith (1780–1807), who married Judge John Bartow Prevost (1766–1825).
- Anna Maria Smith, who married Thomas Callender (1778–1827).
- Susan French Smith (1784–1849), who married Dr. Dirck G. Solomons.
- Mary Clay Smith (1787–1864), who married Kentucky Secretary of State Joseph Cabell Breckinridge (1788–1823), the son of U.S. Attorney General John Breckinridge and the father of Vice President John C. Breckinridge.
- John Witherspoon Smith, who married Sarah Henrietta Duer (b. 1787), daughter of Continental Congressman William Duer.
- Caroline Laurens Smith (1798–1814), who died young.

Smith died on August 21, 1819, in Princeton, New Jersey.

== Works ==
- Essay on the Causes of Variety of Complexion and Figure in the Human Species. (1787, 2nd ed. 1810)
- Sermons. Newark, New Jersey: Jacob Halsey and Co., 1799.
- Lectures on the Evidences of the Christian Religion. (1809)
- Lectures on Moral and Political Philosophy. (1812)
- A Comprehensive View of the Leading and Most Important Principles of Natural and Revealed Religion: Digested in Such Order as to Present to the Pious and Reflecting Mind, a Basis for the Superstructure of the Entire System of the Doctrines of the Gospel, Samuel Stanhope Smith, New Brunswick, N.J., Deare & Myer, 1815

Academic offices
Preceded by New position	President of Hampden–Sydney College; 1775—1779	Succeeded by John Blair Smith
Preceded by John Witherspoon	President of the College of New Jersey; 1795–1812	Succeeded by Ashbel Green
Religious titles
Preceded by Rev. John Blair Smith	Moderator of the 11th General Assembly of the Presbyterian Church in the United States of America; 1799–1800	Succeeded by Rev. Joseph Clark
