= John William Yeomans =

Presbyterian pastor and college administrator

The Reverend John William Yeomans
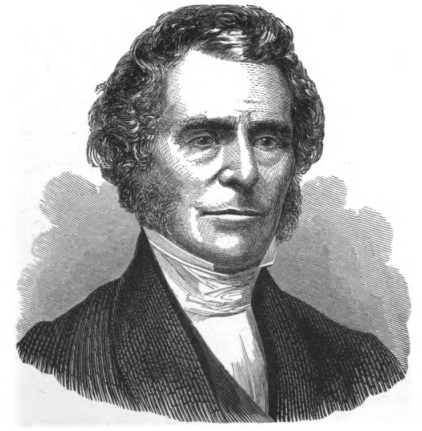
- Born: January 7, 1800; Hinsdale, Massachusetts
- Died: June 22, 1863 (aged 63); Danville, Pennsylvania
- Education: Williams College; Andover Theological Seminary
- Occupation: Presbyterian minister
- Ordained: November 12, 1828
- Offices held: Lafayette College president 1841–1844; Moderator of the General Assembly of the Presbyterian Church 1860

John William Yeomans (January 7, 1800 – June 22, 1863) was a Presbyterian pastor, the second president of Lafayette College, and the moderator of the 72nd General Assembly of the Presbyterian Church in 1860. He has been regarded as one of the leading theologians in the Presbyterian Church of the 1800s, and an important metaphysician.

== Early life ==
Yeomans was born January 7, 1800, in Hinsdale, Massachusetts. His first vocation was as a blacksmith's apprentice, though he bought out his apprenticeship so that he may begin to study theology. Yeomans' initial education began under Reverend Cummings of Albany, New York, and he supported himself by teaching classes during the day and night. Around 1820 he moved to Williamstown, Massachusetts, where he attended Williams College, graduating in 1824 as second in his class. He stayed with the college until 1827 as a tutor before attending Andover Theological Seminary to complete his studies in theology.

== Career ==
Yeomans was ordained in November 1828 and first served as pastor to a small congregation he helped create in North Adams, Massachusetts. Because of its proximity to Williams College many of the members in this congregation were individuals he worked with while at the school. Before he was ordained, Yeomans held a successful fundraiser in the town to construct a new church for the congregation he would soon lead. This church opened on November 12, 1828, and upon its completion Yeomans was installed as its first pastor. He stayed with this congregation until 1832 when he accepted a call to preach at the First Congregational Church in Pittsfield, Massachusetts. After two more years he moved on again to preach at the First Presbyterian Church of Trenton, New Jersey, taking over for Rev. James Waddel Alexander. He served from 1834 to 1841, and in 1838 was involved in the construction of the third church on the property following previous damage from a lightning strike.

On May 6, 1841, Yeomans accepted an offer from Lafayette College to become its second president. During his tenure Yeomans was active in helping to accept black students and Native Americans to the college, and himself taught courses titled "Moral and Mental Philosophy" and "Evidences of Christianity." After only three years he resigned from his position on September 19, 1844.

After the presidency at Lafayette, Yeomans served the rest of his career as pastor of the Mahoning Presbyterian Church in Danville, Pennsylvania. In 1860 he was chosen as the moderator of the General Assembly of the Old School Presbyterian Church where he called for a national day of prayer to be held on January 4, 1861.

== Personal life ==
Yeomans married Laetitia Snyder of Albany in 1828, with whom he had two daughters and three sons. Two of his sons became Presbyterian ministers themselves.

In 1841 Yeomans received three honorary Doctor of Divinity degrees from The College of New Jersey (now Princeton University), Williams College, and Miami University. He was a prolific writer to both the Biblical Repertory and The Princeton Review, the latter to which he wrote twenty articles.

Yeomans died on June 22, 1863, in Danville, Pennsylvania.

Academic offices
Preceded by George Junkin	President of Lafayette College; 1841–1844	Succeeded by George Junkin
Religious titles
Preceded by Rev. William L. Breckenridge	Moderator of the 74th General Assembly of the Presbyterian Church in the United States of America (Old School); 1860-1861	Succeeded by Rev. John Chester Backus
