= Nicholas Murray (Presbyterian) =

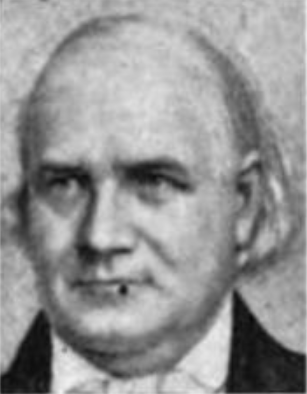
- Born: December 25, 1802; Ballinasloe, Ireland
- Died: February 4, 1861 (aged 58); Elizabeth, New Jersey
- Education: Williams College
- Occupations: Clergyman, writer

Nicholas Murray (December 25, 1802 – February 4, 1861) was Moderator of the General Assembly of the Presbyterian Church in the United States of America.

== Biography ==
Murray was born in Ballinasloe, County Galway, Ireland, on December 25, 1802. In 1818, he emigrated to the United States, becoming an apprentice printer with Harper Brothers. He graduated from Williams College in 1826, he was ordained a minister, and became Moderator of the Presbyterian General Assembly of America.

Murray wrote extensively of his travels and archaeology, which was an abiding interest. An occasional pseudonym was Kirwan. He died and was buried in Elizabeth, New Jersey, in 1861.

== Select bibliography ==
- Letters to the Rt. Rev. J. Hughes, Roman Catholic Bishop of New York, by Kirwan. 2nd series, 1848
- Kirwan's letter to Dr. Cote, on Baptism, with Dr. Cote's reply, 1849
- the Decline of Popery and its causes. An address, etc,, New York, 1851
- Romanism at home, being letters to the Hon. Roger B. Taney, 1852
- American Principles on National Prosperity. A thanksgiving Sermon (on Ps. CXVIII.25), etc.', 1854
- Kirwan (i.e., N. Murray) on Bedini and Dr. Duff. An address, etc, 1854

Religious titles
Preceded by The Rev. Alexander T. McGill	Moderator of the 62nd General Assembly of the Presbyterian Church in the United States of America (Old School); 1850–1851	Succeeded by The Rev. Aaron W. Leland
