= Jonathan Edwards (the younger) =

American theologian and linguist

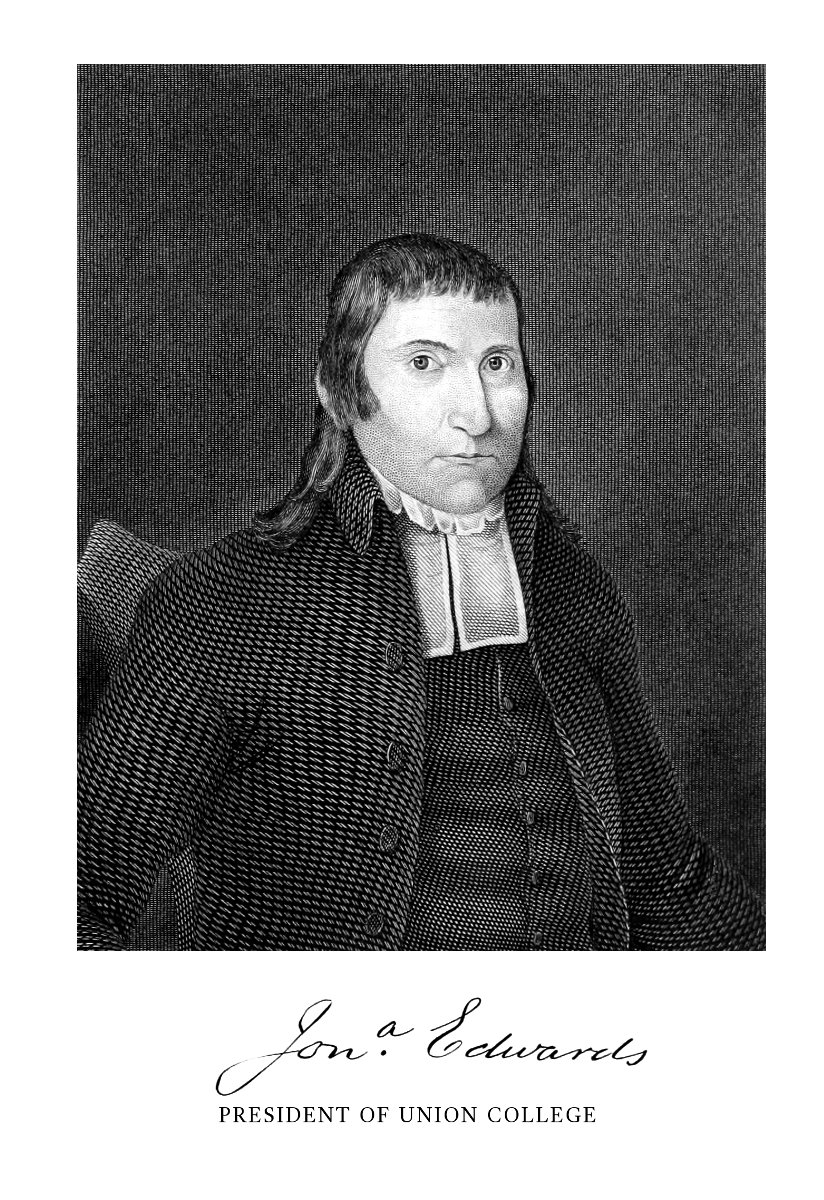

President of Union College
- In office 1799–1801
- Preceded by: John Blair Smith
- Succeeded by: Jonathan Maxcy

Personal details
- Born: May 26, 1745 Northampton, Massachusetts Bay
- Died: August 1, 1801 (aged 56) Schenectady, New York, U.S.
- Education: Princeton University

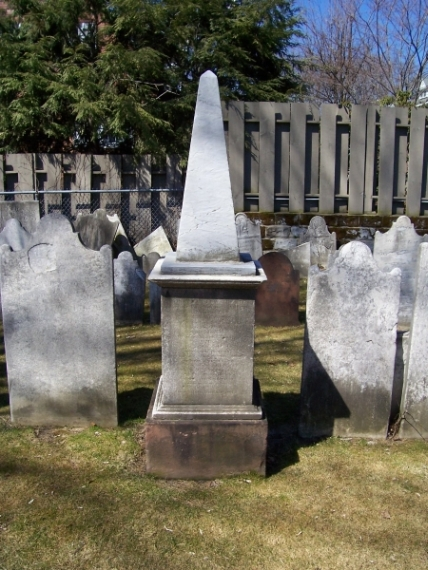
Grave of Jonathan Edwards at Schenectady, New York

Jonathan Edwards (May 26, 1745 – August 1, 1801) was an American theologian and linguist.

== Life and career ==
Born in Northampton, in Massachusetts Bay, he was the ninth child and second son of Jonathan Edwards and Sarah (Pierpont) Edwards. In 1751, the family moved to Stockbridge, Massachusetts, where his exposure to language variation began. Both of Edwards' parents died during the year of 1758. He graduated from Princeton in 1765, after which he studied theology under Joseph Bellamy of Bethlehem, Connecticut. He was a tutor at Princeton from 1767 to 1769, and a pastor in New Haven, Connecticut from 1769 to 1795, where he was dismissed from this position due to doctrinal conflicts in the church. Despite this dismissal, he was called back to another church in Colebrook, Connecticut that same year. After serving as pastor in Colebrook, Connecticut from 1795 to 1799, he moved to Schenectady, New York, to serve as the president of Union College.

Edwards died on August 1, 1801, and was buried in the churchyard of the First Presbyterian Church in Schenectady, New York.

== Contribution to theology ==
As a theologian, his fame rests upon his reply to Charles Chauncy upon the salvation of all men, in which he defended the orthodox evangelical doctrine, his reply to Samuel West's Essays on Liberty and Necessity, in which he largely modified his father's theory of the will by giving it a liberal interpretation, and upon his sermons on the atonement. A great deal of religious controversy raged in New England during his lifetime. His works were published at Andover in two volumes, and were later re-published together along with a memoir by Tryon Edwards.

Unlike his father, who was a slave-owner, Jonathan Edwards the younger supported abolition of the slave trade and of slavery. His anti-slavery viewpoint was first evidenced in 1773, when he wrote a series of articles entitled “Some Observations upon the Slavery of Negroes” in the Connecticut Journal and the New-Haven Post-Boy (Gamertsfelder, p. 137). These views were further articulated in his 1791 sermon, "The Injustice and Impolicy of the Slave trade." It was his work and some of Samuel Hopkins's which were among the first direct appeals to the freedom of slaves from the New England ministry. While much of his work was spent defending the works of his father Jonathan Edwards, Joseph Bellamy, and Samuel Hopkins, he was a key part of the 1801 Plan of Union. He died in 1801.

== Contribution to linguistics ==
Edwards was a pioneer in the historical linguistics of Native North America. He was raised in the community of Stockbridge, Massachusetts, where Native American speakers of the Mohican language were the majority, and he became fluent in that language as a child. In 1755, Edwards's father sent him to stay in the Iroquois settlement of Onohoquaga as part of his training for future missionary work. Through this experience, Edwards acquired first-hand knowledge of both Iroquoian and Algonquian languages.

Many years later, in 1787, Edwards published a study of the Mohican language, which he referred to as Muhhekaneew. In Observations on the Language of the Muhhekaneew Indians..., he chronicled basic vocabulary and grammar rules and recorded the marked differences between Mohican and English. He argued against the misconception that Native Americans had no distinct parts of speech in their language:

It has been said that savages have no parts of speech beside the substantive and the verb. This is not true concerning the Mohegans, nor concerning any other tribe of Indians, of whose language I have any knowledge. The Mohegans have all the eight parts of speech, to be found in other languages; though prepositions are so rarely used, except in composition, that I once determined that part of speech to be wanting.

Among some of the grammar rules he noted was that Mohican "[has] no diversity of gender, either in nouns or pronouns". It can use plural forms just by adding an extra morpheme to the singular form. (For instance, "boy" is penumpaufoo and "boys" is penumpaufoouk.) Mohican does not contain any adjectives; instead, neuter verbs are used to express qualities.

Of further significance was the evidence he presented for the relatedness of Algonquian languages throughout northeastern North America and their distinctness from the neighboring Iroquoian languages. Edwards's work on New World linguistic classification paralleled that of his contemporary, William Jones, on the Indo-European languages.
