= George Junkin =

American university president and Presbyterian minister

The Reverend George Junkin
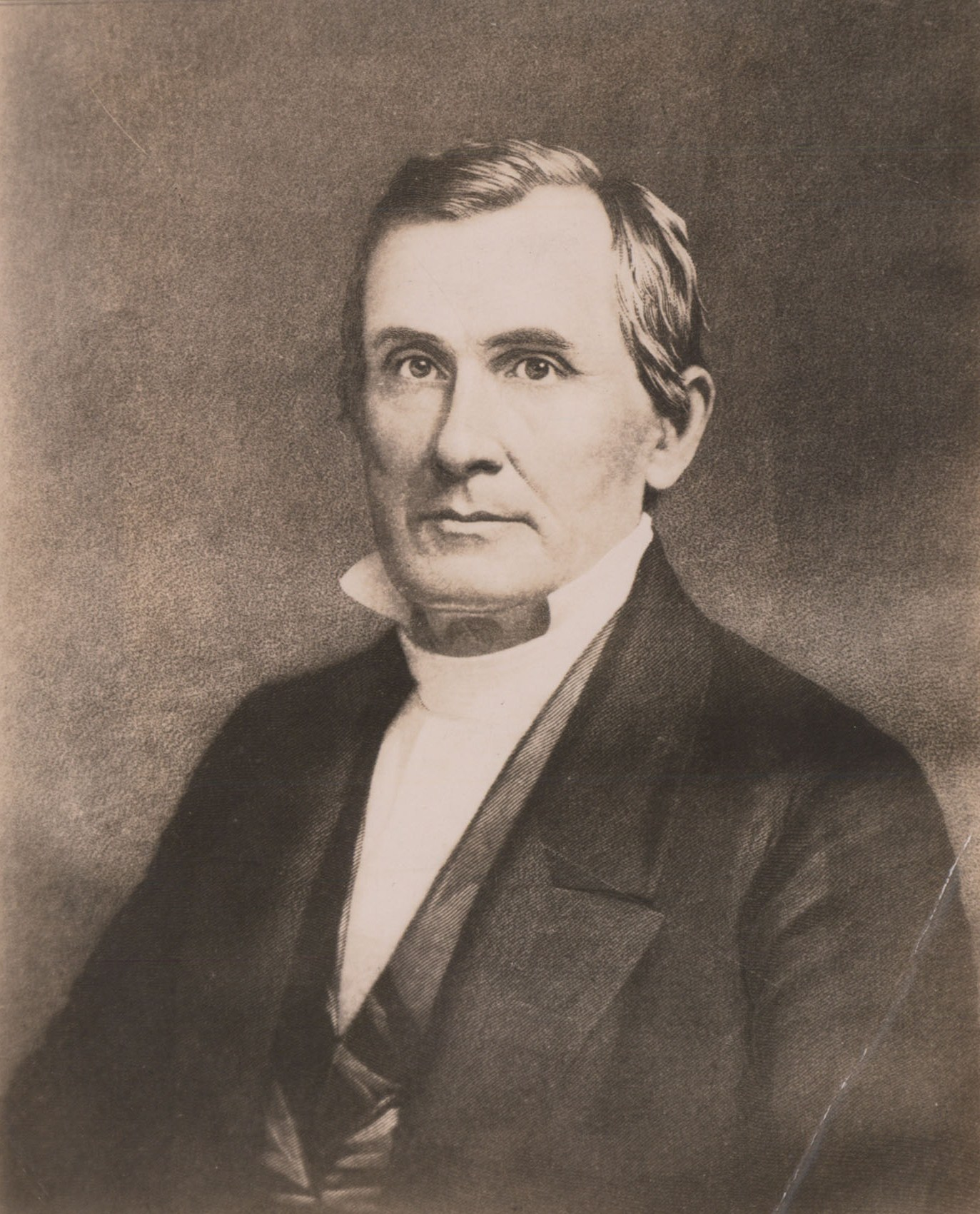
- George Junkin from his time at Washington College
- Born: November 1, 1790; Cumberland County, Pennsylvania
- Died: May 20, 1868 (aged 77); Philadelphia, Pennsylvania
- Education: Jefferson College; Theological Seminary of the Associate Reformed Presbyterian Church, NYC
- Occupation: Presbyterian minister
- Ordained: 1816
- Offices held: Lafayette College (president 1832–1840, 1844–1848); Miami University (president 1841–1844); Washington and Lee University (president 1848–1861)

The Reverend George Junkin (November 1, 1790 – May 20, 1868) was an American educator and Presbyterian minister who served as the first and third president of Lafayette College and later as president of Miami University and Washington College (now Washington and Lee University).

== Biography ==
George, the son of Joseph Junkin, was the sixth of fourteen children born in Cumberland County, Pennsylvania. His early years were spent on his father's farm where he prepared for college. He graduated from Jefferson College (now Washington and Jefferson College) in 1813. After studying theology privately, he entered the Theological Seminary of the Associate Reformed Presbyterian Church, in New York City and was licensed to preach by the Presbytery of Monongahela in 1816. He was soon called to the charge of the United Congregations of Milton, Pennsylvania and McEwensville, Pennsylvania, where he remained for about eleven years. He left the reformed denomination to become a Presbyterian in 1822. In 1830, he became Principal of the Manual Labor Academy, at Germantown, Pennsylvania, one of the first institutions of the kind to go into operation in the United States. Two years later he became the first President of Lafayette College. In 1841, he accepted the Presidency of Miami University in Oxford, Ohio remaining three years, when he again returned to Easton. He was Moderator of the General Assembly in 1844.

In November 1848 he became the President of Washington College (now Washington and Lee University) in Lexington, Virginia; he followed Henry Ruffner as president. Junkin's published speeches as president of Washington College include his inaugural address in February 1849 and one at Rutgers College in July 1856. Junkin remained at Washington College until May, 1861, when he resigned the presidency at the age of 71 and moved to Philadelphia amidst controversy regarding his pro-Union views and Virginia's secession from the United States. Confederate General Stonewall Jackson had been Junkin's friend and eventually son in law when Jackson was a teacher at the Virginia Military Institute, which also is located in Lexington. The movie Gods and Generals briefly portrays the poignant end to this friendship, at the start of the Civil War, when Jackson joined the Confederate army (taking one of Junkin's sons with him) and Junkin departed for Pennsylvania. During the War, Junkin wrote a polemical attack on secession, which was also critical of abolitionists. He died in Philadelphia in 1868 and he was later reburied in Lexington, Virginia. His headstone incorrectly indicates that he was the founder of Miami University.

Among Junkin's children were, Elinor, the first wife of Confederate General Stonewall Jackson, the poet Margaret Junkin Preston, and a son, George Junkin, Jr.

== Tenure at Miami University ==
George Junkin succeeded Robert Hamilton Bishop as Miami University's second president, serving from 1841 to 1844. He quickly established his philosophy about college leadership, proclaiming that a monarchical system best suits a college administration, with the President serving as King. This was a difficult adjustment for students and faculty, who had been used to the more progressive Bishop administration. There was also controversy over his proslavery views, which he expressed in a pamphlet published in 1843 known as The Integrity of Our National Union vs. Abolitionism.

The years of the Junkin administration began the "sullen years" of Miami, where there was a definite gloom amongst the students and faculty on campus. As a result of their dislike, he spent only three years before moving back to Lafayette. His tombstone inaccurately describes him as the founder of Miami University. The campus of Miami University has no building or location which bears his name, which argue that his three years at Miami were not enjoyable.

== Role in Presbyterian Church history ==
In the 1830s, Junkin took part in a major event in Presbyterian Church history, known as the Old School-New School Controversy. Junkin (representing the Old School) served as the prosecutor in a church trial of Albert Barnes (a leading New School theologian), accusing him of heresy. This controversy, which turned on theological differences and regional prejudices, eventually led the Presbyterian Church to split in 1838.

== Archival collections ==
The Presbyterian Historical Society in Philadelphia, Pennsylvania, has a collection of Junkin's correspondences, sermons and photographs in its holdings.

The University of North Carolina at Chapel Hill has genealogical notes of the Junkin Family in the Southern Historical Collections at the Louis Round Wilson Special Collections Library.

Academic offices
Preceded by Position Created; John William Yeomans	President of Lafayette College; 1832–1840; 1848–1849	Succeeded by John William Yeomans; Charles William Nassau
Preceded by Robert Hamilton Bishop	President of Miami University; 1841 – 1844	Succeeded by Erasmus D. MacMaster
Preceded by Henry Ruffner	President of Washington and Lee University; 1848—1861	Succeeded by Robert E. Lee
Religious titles
Preceded by The Rev. Gardiner Spring	Moderator of the 56th General Assembly of the Presbyterian Church in the United States of America (Old School); 1844–1845	Succeeded by The Rev. John Michael Krebs
