= Azel Roe =

Azel Roe (February 20, 1738 – December 2, 1815) was an American clergyman.

Roe was born in Setauket, Long Island. He was the son of John Roe. He was a brother of Austin Roe of George Washington's Culper Spy Ring.

He graduated from the College of New Jersey (now known as Princeton University) with a bachelor of arts degree in 1756 and received a doctorate in divinity from Yale in 1800.

He received a license to preach from the New York Presbytery in 1759 or 1760 and was later ordained by the New York Presbytery. He was called as minister of the First Presbyterian Church in Woodbridge, NJ in 1763 and served there until his death.

He was a trustee of the College of New Jersey from 1778-1807.

He served as moderator of the General Assembly of the Presbyterian Church in the United States of America at the 14th General Assembly in 1802.

He died on December 2, 1815.

Religious titles
Preceded by The Rev. Nathaniel Irwin	Moderator of the 14th General Assembly of the Presbyterian Church in the United States of America; 1802–1803	Succeeded by The Rev. James Hall
