= Herrick Johnson =

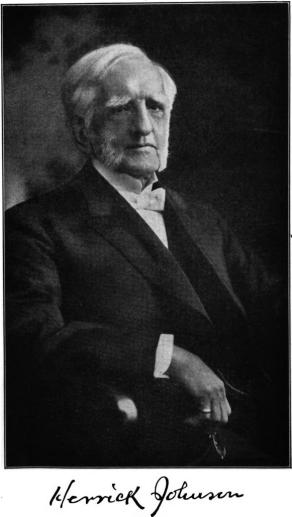
- Born: September 21, 1832; Auriesville, New York, U.S.
- Died: November 20, 1913 (aged 81)
- Occupations: Clergyman; Author

Herrick Johnson (September 21, 1832 – November 20, 1913) was a leading American Presbyterian clergyman and author.

Born in Auriesville, New York, Johnson graduated from Hamilton College in 1857 and from the Auburn Theological Seminary in 1860. On September 6, 1860, he married Katherine Spencer Hardenburg. After ministering in churches in Troy, New York, Pittsburgh, Pennsylvania, Chicago, Illinois, and Philadelphia, Pennsylvania, he returned to Auburn Theological Seminary to teach, also teaching at McCormick Theological Seminary in Chicago. In 1882, he was elected moderator of the General Assembly of the Presbyterian Church in the United States of America. He was extensively quoted in the 1895 Dictionary of Burning Words of Brilliant Writers.

Religious titles
| Preceded by The Rev. Henry Darling | Moderator of the 94th General Assembly of the Presbyterian Church in the United States of America; 1882–1883 | Succeeded by The Rev. Edwin Francis Hatfield |
