= John Michael Krebs =

American Presbyterian clergyman (1804–1867)

John Michael Krebs (born in Hagerstown, Maryland, 6 May 1804; died in New York City, 30 September 1867) was a Presbyterian clergyman of the United States. He was president of the Princeton Theological Seminary 1865–1867.

== Biography ==
He became a clerk in the employ of his father, the postmaster of Hagerstown, but spent his leisure in study, and graduated from Dickinson College in 1827, and from Princeton Theological Seminary in 1829. From 1829 until his death, he was pastor of the Rutgers Presbyterian Church in New York City.

He held many offices in the Old-School branch of his church, and was a member of the board of foreign missions from its organization, and several years its president. In 1842 he became a director of Princeton Theological Seminary, and its president in 1865, which offices he held till his death. Dickinson gave him the degree of D.D. in 1841. From 1847 to 1853 he was a trustee of Lafayette College.

He published sermons and religious works, The Private, Domestic, and Social Life of Jesus Christ: a Model for Youth (Philadelphia, 1849), and the Presbyterian Psalmist (1852).

== Notes ==
Religious titles
Preceded by The Rev. George Junkin	Moderator of the 57th General Assembly of the Presbyterian Church in the United States of America (Old School); 1845–1846	Succeeded by The Rev. Charles Hodge
