= Downtown Trenton Commercial Historic District =

- U.S. National Register of Historic Places
- U.S. Historic district
- New Jersey Register of Historic Places
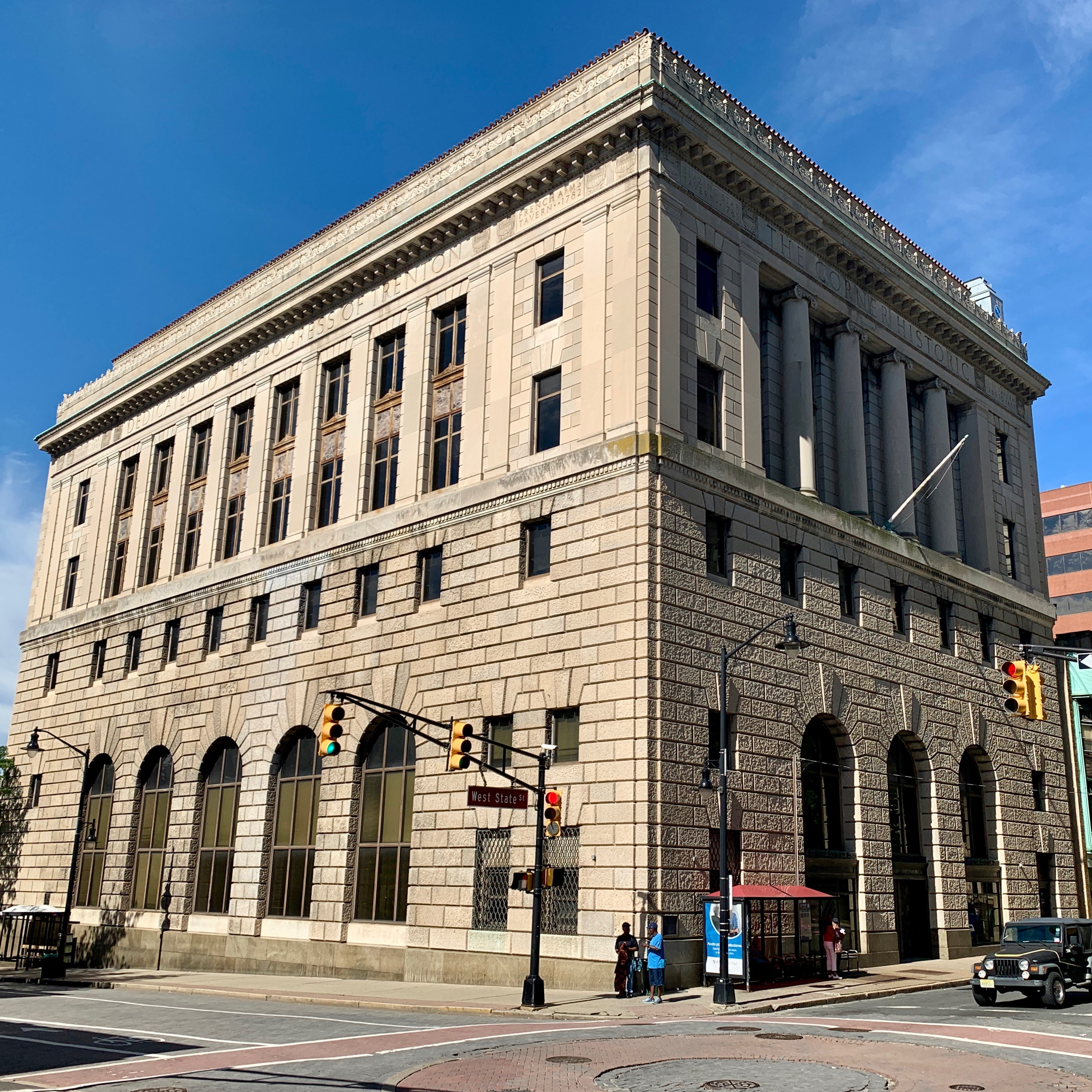
- First Mechanics National Bank; One West State Street

- Location within Mercer County, New Jersey Location within New Jersey Location within the United States
- Location: W. and E. State Street, N. and S. Broad Street, E. Hanover Street, S. Montgomery Street and S. Warren Street, Trenton, New Jersey
- Coordinates: 40°13′12″N 74°45′51″W
- Area: 12 acres (4.9 ha)
- NRHP reference No.: 100011495
- NJRHP No.: 3269

Significant dates
- Added to NRHP: March 10, 2025
- Designated NJRHP: January 14, 2025

The Downtown Trenton Commercial Historic District is a 12-acre (4.9 ha) historic district located along Broad and State Streets in the city of Trenton in Mercer County, New Jersey, United States. It was added to the National Register of Historic Places on March 10, 2025, for its significance in architecture and commerce. The district has 70 contributing buildings, including four individually NRHP-listed properties: Broad Street National Bank, First Presbyterian Church, Golden Swan–True American, and New Jersey Division of Motor Vehicles Building.

== History and description ==
The oldest building in the district is the Golden Swan at 101–103 South Warren Street, built in 1815. The First Presbyterian Church at 120 East State Street features Greek Revival architecture and was built in 1839. The Broad Street National Bank was designed by William A. Poland with Beaux Arts style and built in 1900. First Mechanics National Bank at One West State Street was designed by York and Sawyer and built in 1930. The New Jersey Division of Motor Vehicles Building at 25 South Montgomery Street was designed by the architectural firm Kramer, Hirsch & Carchidi featuring International Style and completed in 1961.

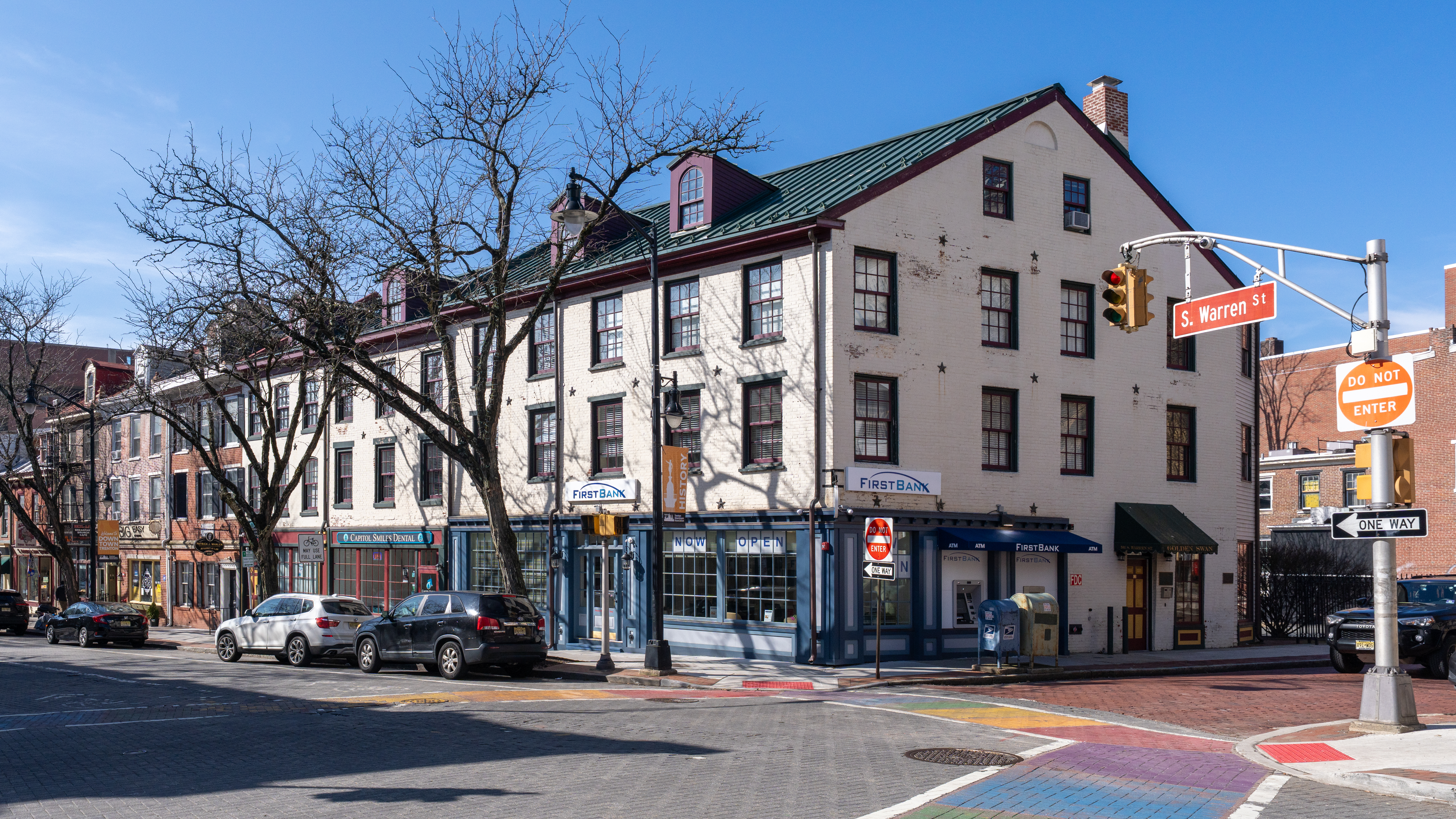
Golden Swan

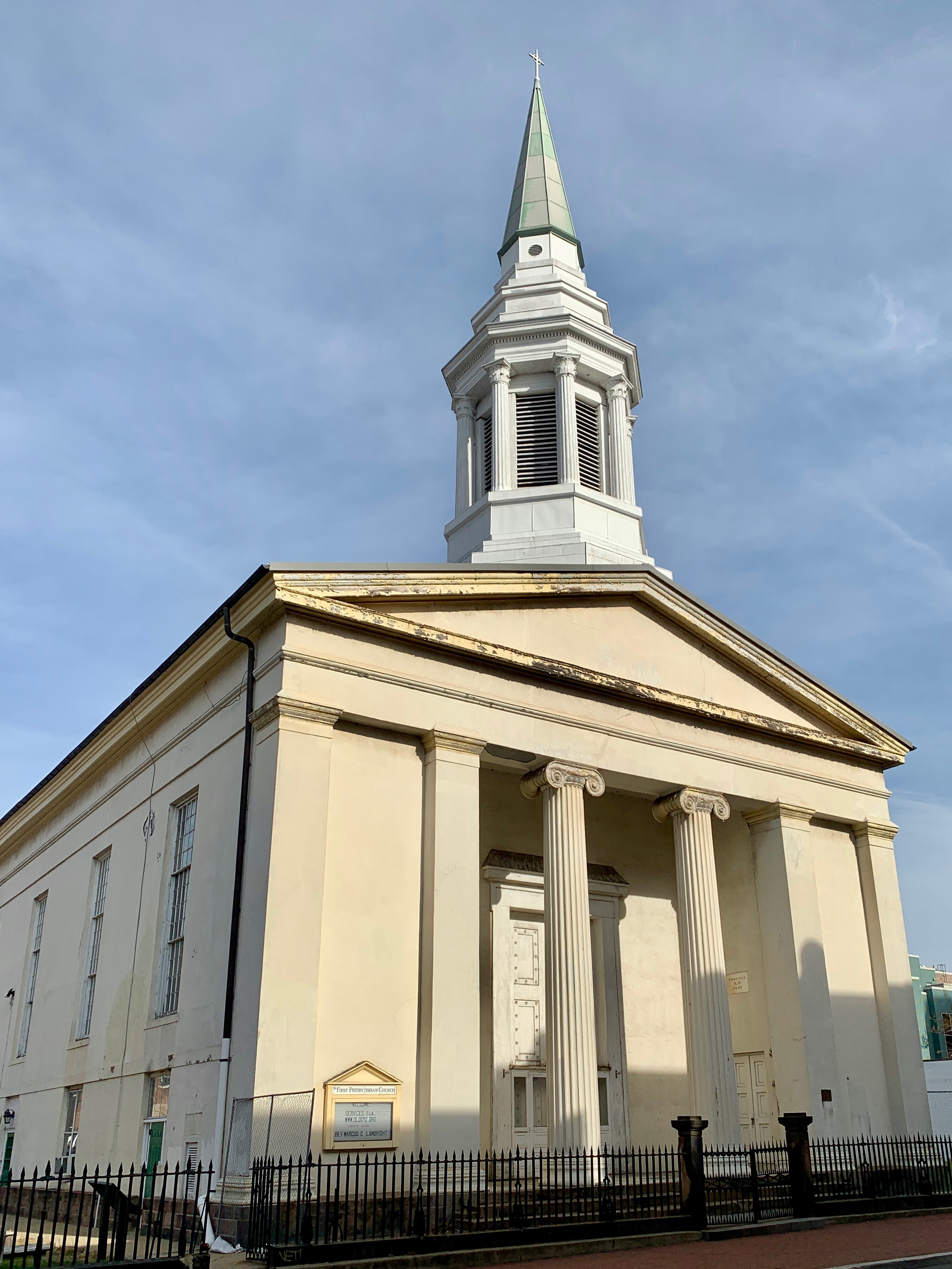
First Presbyterian Church

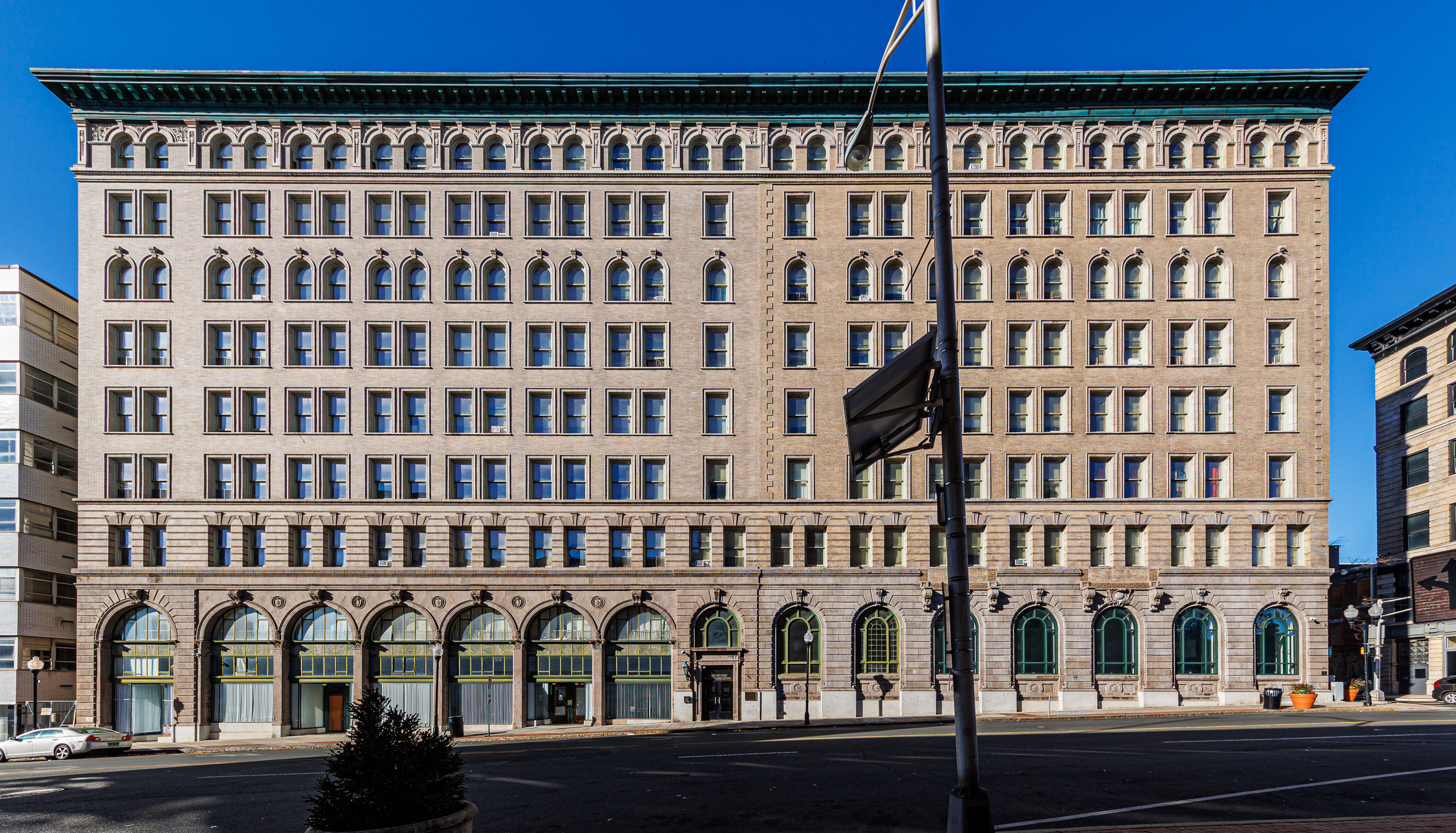
Broad Street National Bank

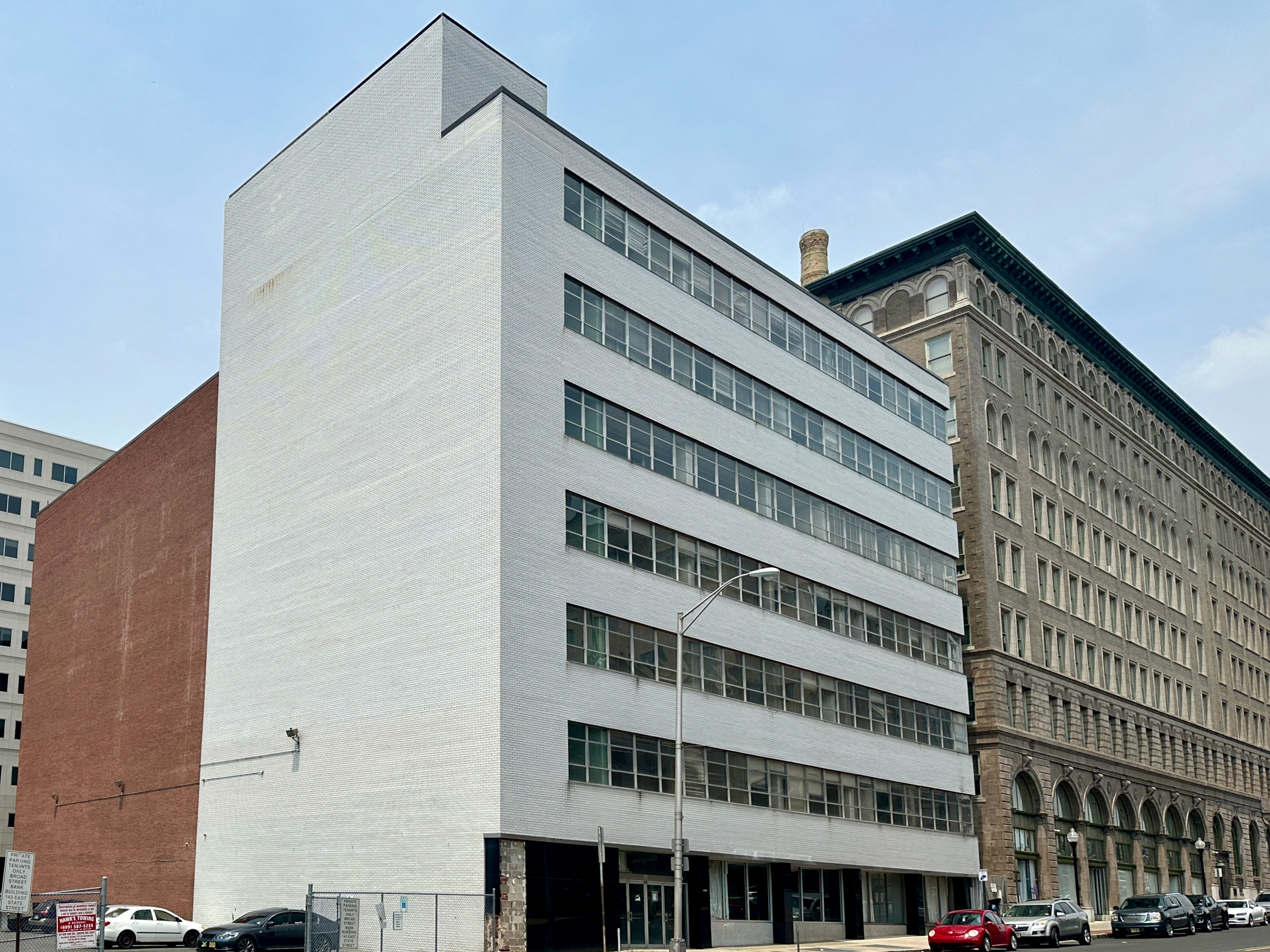
New Jersey Division of Motor Vehicles Building

== See also ==
- National Register of Historic Places listings in Mercer County, New Jersey
