= John Willis Baer =

Presbyterian official, Occidental College president (1861-1931)

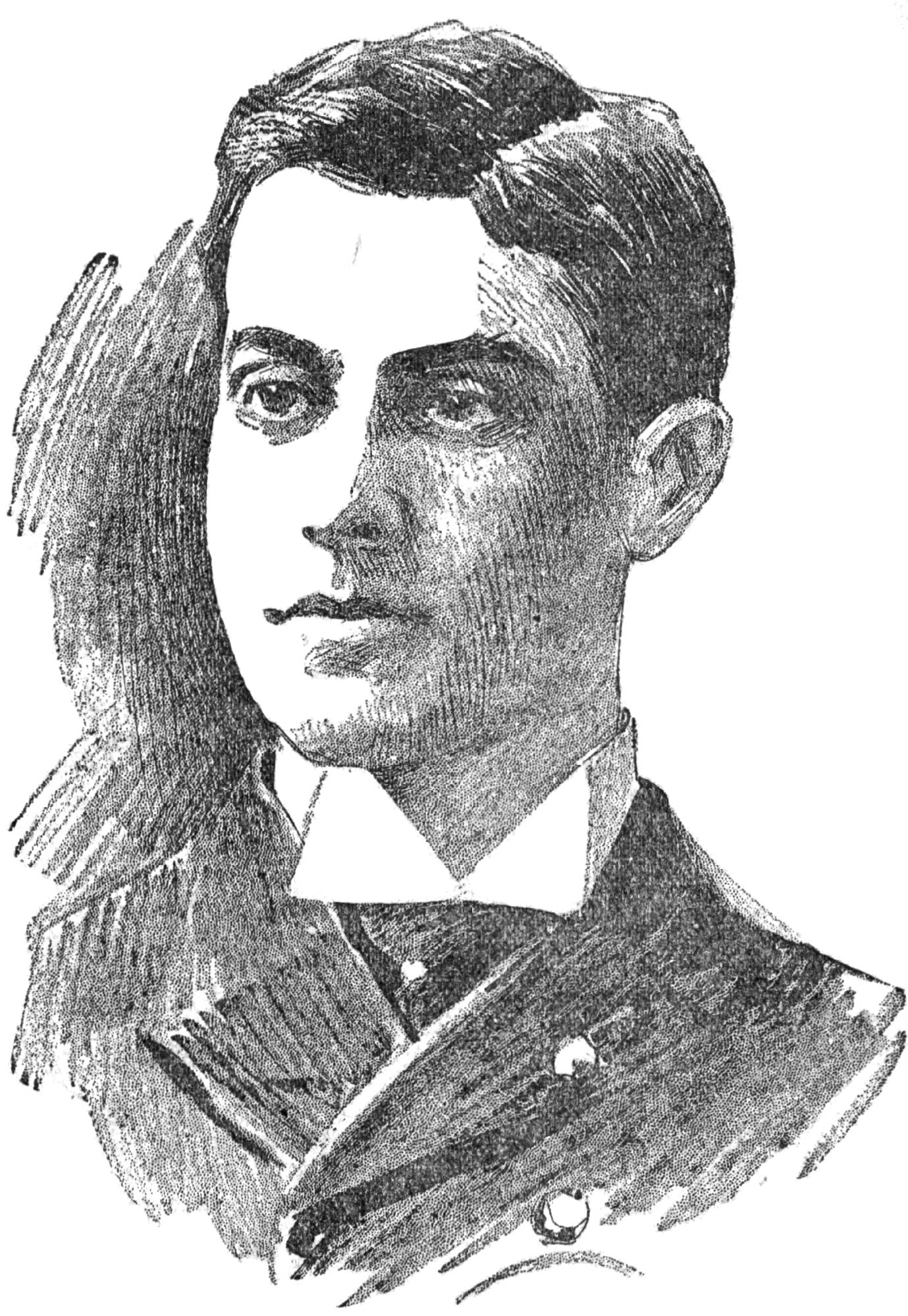
John Willis Baer in his early years.

Dr. John Willis Baer (March 2, 1861 in Rochester, Minnesota– February 8, 1931 in Pasadena, California) was an official of the Presbyterian Church and a president of Occidental College. From 1890-1900 he was the Young People's Secretary of the United Society of Christian Endeavor. In 1893, he compiled the Junior Christian Endeavor songbook. From 1900 to 1906, he was the assistant secretary of the Board of Home Missions of the Presbyterian Church.

He was President of Occidental College in Los Angeles (then a Presbyterian school) from 1906 to 1916. During his presidency, the college moved to Eagle Rock, Los Angeles, hosted President William Howard Taft, severed ties with the Presbyterian Church, and attempted, but failed, to convert into an all-men's institution. The plans were met with widespread backlash from students and faculty who protested the change. The community outcry garnered national headlines and the board later dropped the proposal. Baer resigned the presidency on November 1, 1916, due to exhaustion and the failure of a capital campaign to meet expectations.

In 1919 was elected Moderator of the General Assembly of the Presbyterian Church in the United States of America. Following his tenure as President of Occidental, Baer became a Vice-President of Security Pacific National Bank In 1931, he died of a heart attack in his cottage at the Huntington Hotel. He is buried at Forest Lawn Memorial Park in Glendale.

Religious titles
Preceded by The Rev. J. Frank Smith	Moderator of the 131st General Assembly of the Presbyterian Church in the United States of America; 1919–1920	Succeeded by The Rev. Samuel S. Palmer
