= First Presbyterian Church (Trenton, New Jersey) =

Historic church in New Jersey, United States

- U.S. National Register of Historic Places
- U.S. Historic district – Contributing property
- New Jersey Register of Historic Places
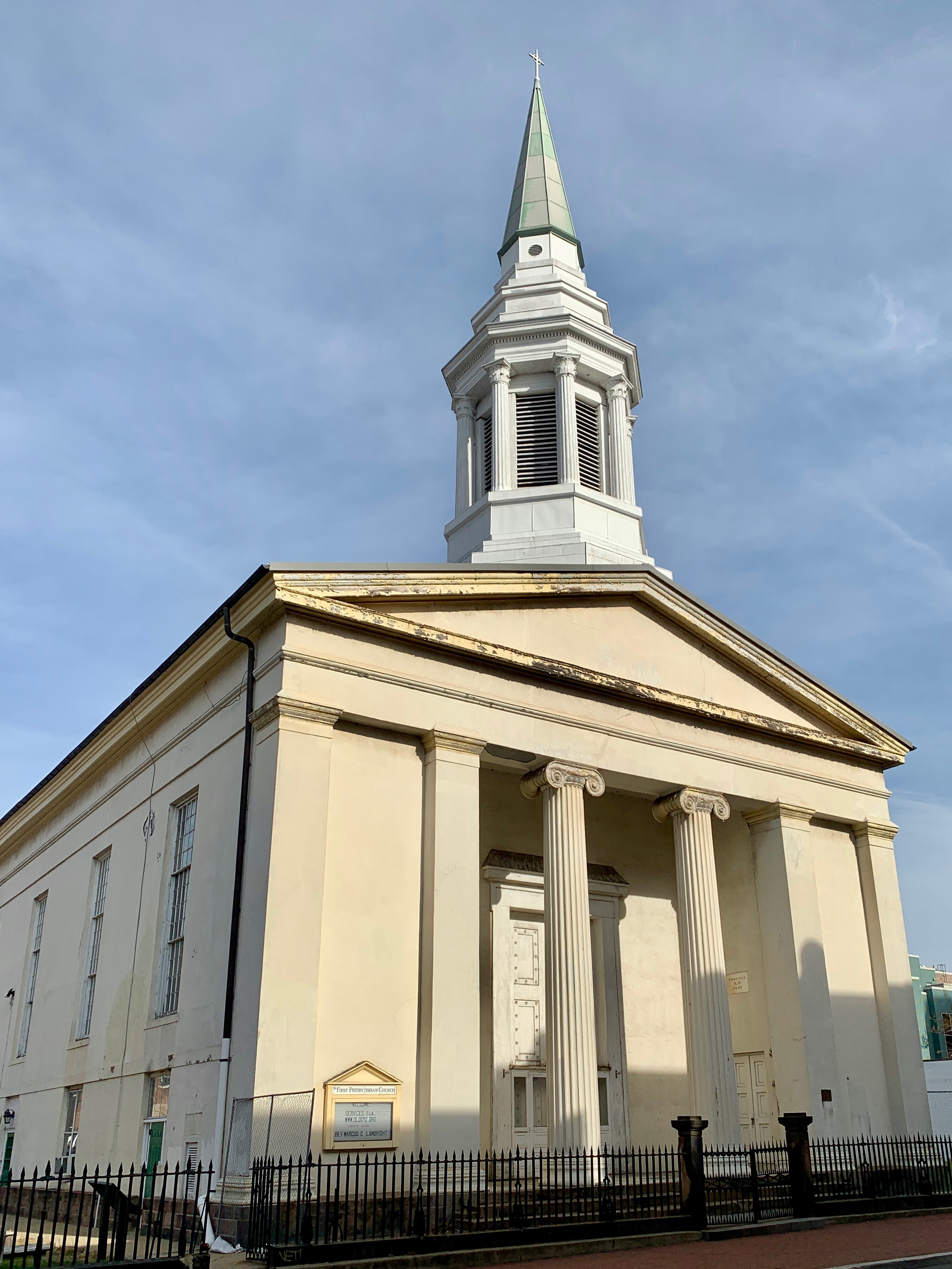
- First Presbyterian Church in 2020

- Location within Mercer County, New Jersey Location within New Jersey Location within the United States
- Location: 120 E. State Street; Trenton, New Jersey
- Coordinates: 40°13′13.6″N 74°45′47.9″W
- Built: 1839/1712
- Architect: Horatio Nelson Hotchkiss; Hotchkiss & Thompson
- Architectural style: Greek Revival
- Part of: Downtown Trenton Commercial Historic District (ID100011495)
- NRHP reference No.: 05000967
- NJRHP No.: 4269

Significant dates
- Added to NRHP: September 09, 2005
- Designated CP: March 10, 2025
- Designated NJRHP: July 22, 2005

First Presbyterian Church is a historic church located at 120 East State Street in Trenton, Mercer County, New Jersey, United States. The church's first congregation got together in 1712 and their first church was built in 1726. The church building and churchyard cemetery were added to the National Register of Historic Places for their significance in architecture, politics, religion, and social history on September 9, 2005. The church was added as a contributing property to the Downtown Trenton Commercial Historic District on March 10, 2025.

== History and description ==
The current church was built in 1839 and is the third one at this site. It was designed by architect Horatio Nelson Hotchkiss with Greek Revival style and features two Ionic columns. It has a 120-foot (37 m) high octagonal steeple. Cemetery plots are located to the east and west of the building.

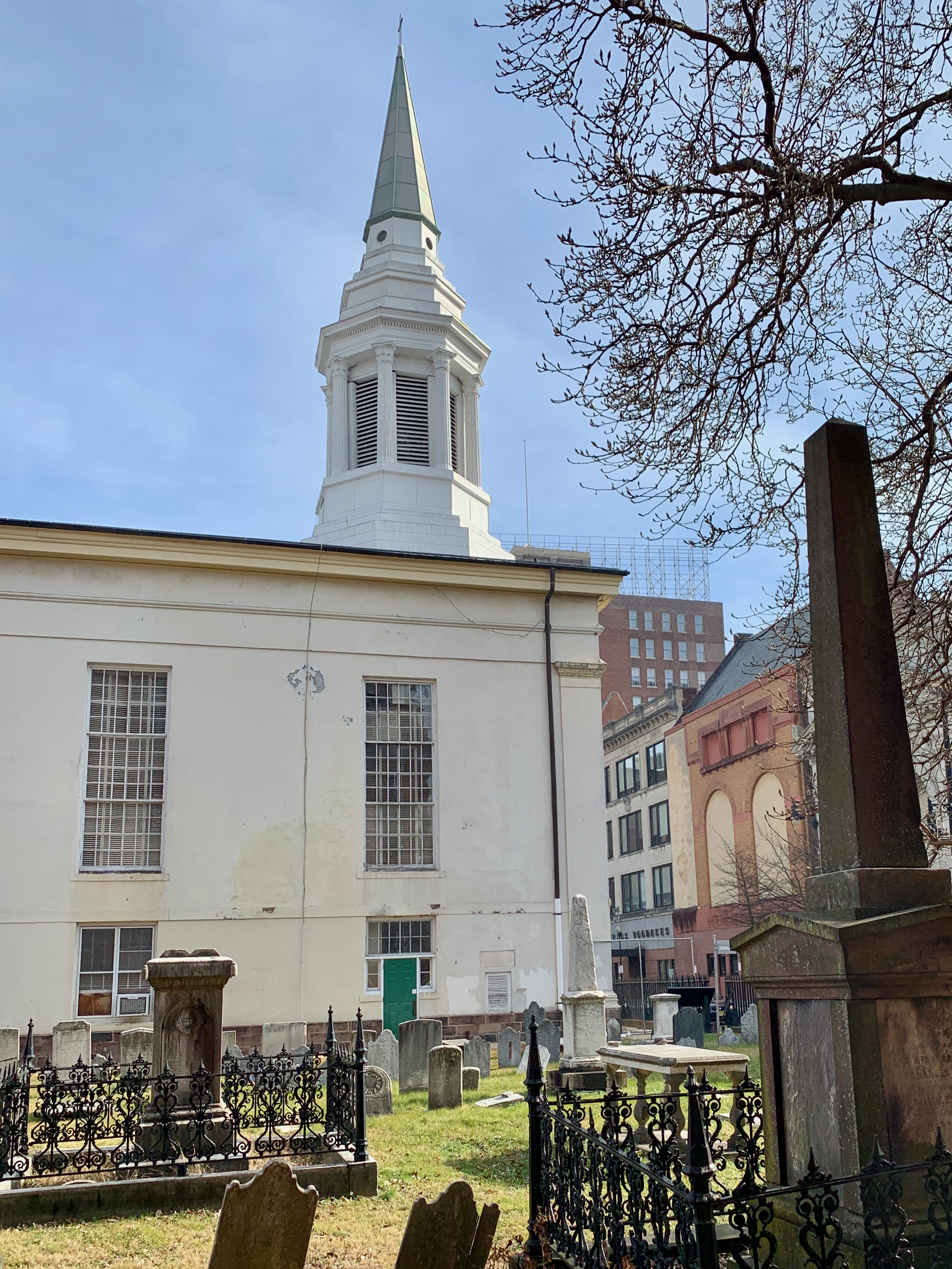
First Presbyterian Church and Cemetery

== Former pastors ==
- David Cowell, 1732–1760
- James Waddel Alexander, 1829–1832
- John William Yeomans, 1834–1841
- Henry Collin Minton, 1891–1902

== Notable interments ==
Colonel Johann Rall, commander of the Hessian troops during the Battle of Trenton, was buried in an unidentified grave in the churchyard of this church, with an inscription dedicated to his memory.

== See also ==
- National Register of Historic Places listings in Mercer County, New Jersey
- List of Presbyterian churches in the United States
