= Tryon Edwards =

American theologian and minister (1809–1894)

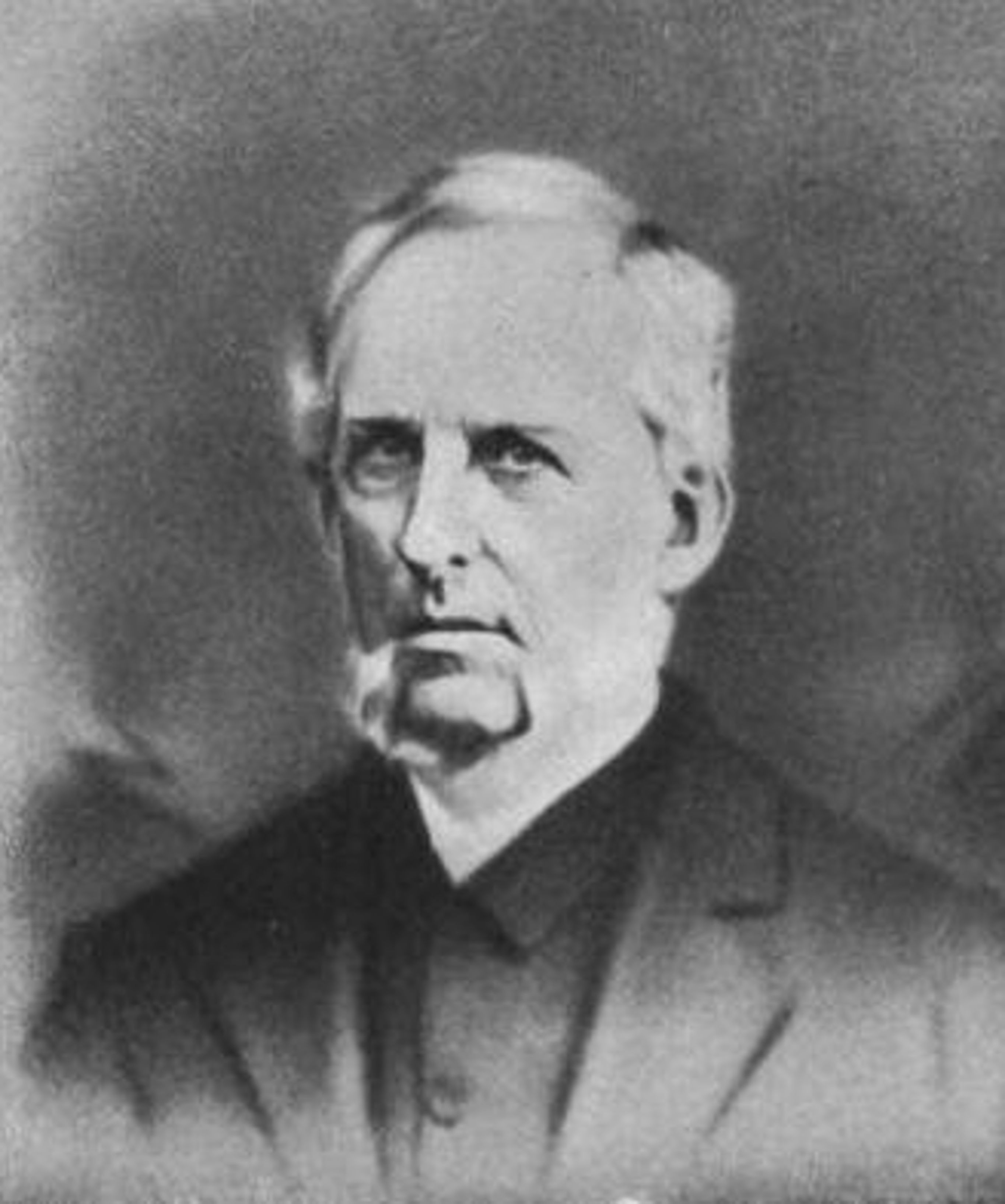
Tryon Edwards

Tryon Edwards (7 August 1809, Hartford, Conn. – 4 January 1894, Detroit, Mich.) was an American theologian, minister of the Second Congregational Church in New London, Connecticut, from 1845 to 1857, after having served in Rochester, New York. He was best known for his collection of quotations, A Dictionary of Thoughts, a book of quotations, for his compilation of the sixteen sermons of his great grandfather, Jonathan Edwards, on 1 Corinthians 13 as Charity And Its Fruits; Christian love as manifested in the heart and life, and for his edition of the works of his grandfather, Jonathan Edwards (the younger) (in 1842).

Edwards wrote: "Thoughts become words, words become deeds, deeds become habits, habits become character, and character becomes destiny. Therefore watch the thoughts of your mind with the sleepless eye of your mind."

Some representative entries from A Dictionary of Thoughts are:

- "Between two evils, choose neither; between two goods, choose both."
- "The first step to improvement, whether mental, moral, or religious, is to know ourselves—our weaknesses, errors, deficiencies, and sins, that, by divine grace, we may overcome and turn from them all."
- "Science has sometimes been said to be opposed to faith, and inconsistent with it. But all science, in fact, rests on a basis of faith, for it assumes the permanence and uniformity of natural laws – a thing which can never be demonstrated."
- "If you would know anything thoroughly, teach it to others."
- "Right actions for the future are the best apologies for wrong ones in the past."
- "True humility is not an abject, groveling, self-despising spirit; it is but a right estimate of ourselves as God sees us."
