= Golden Swan–True American =

- U.S. National Register of Historic Places
- U.S. Historic district – Contributing property
- New Jersey Register of Historic Places
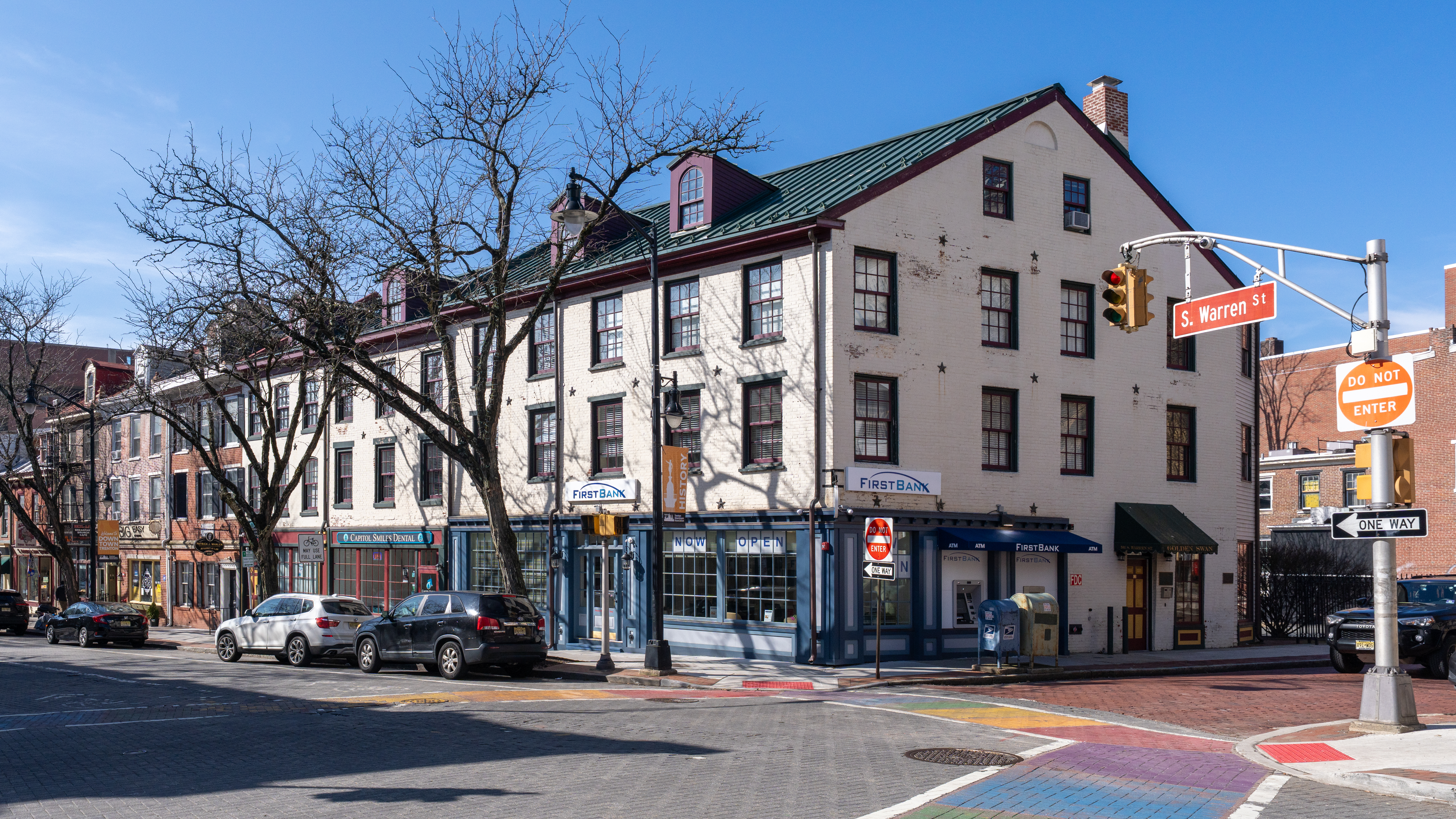

- Location within Mercer County, New Jersey Location within New Jersey Location within the United States
- Location: 101–107 South Warren Street, Trenton, New Jersey
- Coordinates: 40°13′9.12″N 74°45′57.64″W
- Architectural style: Federal
- Part of: Downtown Trenton Commercial Historic District (ID100011495)
- NRHP reference No.: 08000361
- NJRHP No.: 4768

Significant dates
- Added to NRHP: April 30, 2008
- Designated CP: March 10, 2025
- Designated NJRHP: January 25, 2008

The Golden Swan–True American, also known as the Caola Building, is a group of three interconnected brick row houses located at 101–107 South Warren Street in the city of Trenton in Mercer County, New Jersey, United States. 101 South Warren Street was built in 1815, 105 around 1820, and 107 around 1844. The building was added to the National Register of Historic Places on April 30, 2008, for its significance in communications and politics/government. It was added as a contributing property to the Downtown Trenton Commercial Historic District on March 10, 2025.

== History and description ==
William Hancock built the first section at the corner of Front and Warren in 1815. John Yoorhees built the next section in 1820. In 1822, William Hancock described it as a large brick tavern. By 1826, the tavern was known as the Golden Swan and run by Joseph Palmer. Later, the Golden Swan was the headquarters for the local True American newspaper from 1856 until 1872. It was published by Judge David Naar, who was a vocal supporter of the New Jersey Democratic Party, especially during the American Civil War. The building was later the Caola Locksmith Shop.

== See also ==
- National Register of Historic Places listings in Mercer County, New Jersey
