= David Cowell =

Presbyterian pastor and acting president of Princeton University

The Reverend David Cowell

Acting President of Princeton University
- In office 1757–1758
- Preceded by: Aaron Burr Sr.
- Succeeded by: Jonathan Edwards

Personal details
- Born: 1704
- Died: 1760 (aged 55–56)
- Education: Harvard University
- Occupation: Pastor

Coat of Arms of David Cowell

David Cowell (1704–1760) was a Presbyterian minister and briefly the acting president of Princeton University. A graduate of Harvard in 1732, Cowell was a trustee of the college. He was the acting president from 1757 to 1758 and also oversaw the negotiations that led to Samuel Davies becoming the fourth president of the college. He was the first pastor of the First Presbyterian Church in Trenton, New Jersey, serving from 1736 to 1760. He died in 1760 and was buried in the churchyard of First Presbyterian Church.
