= James Francis Armstrong =

American revolutionary chaplain (1750–1816)

James Francis Armstrong (April 3, 1750 – January 19, 1816) was a chaplain from New Jersey in the American Revolutionary War and a Presbyterian minister for 30 years in Trenton, New Jersey.

Armstrong was born in West Nottingham, Maryland. He attended the College of New Jersey (now Princeton University), living with the family of college president John Witherspoon. Armstrong graduated in 1773 with future notables such as Henry Lee, Morgan Lewis, and Aaron Ogden. A younger classmate was Aaron Burr.

After graduation, he continued to study theology under Dr. Witherspoon. He was preparing to enter the ministry in New Brunswick in 1776, but the arrival of the British Army in New Jersey disrupted those plans. Armstrong took up a musket and served as a private in the New Jersey militia, but he was soon thereafter ordained a minister and obtained a post as a regimental chaplain in the Continental Army. He was promoted to brigade chaplain of the Second Maryland Brigade in May 1777.

After the war, he served from 1782 to 1783 as pastor at the church in Elizabeth, New Jersey, a position that had become vacant following the murder of the Rev. James Caldwell during the war. He was married to Susannah Livingston in August 1782, with the Rev. Witherspoon conducting the ceremony. He was minister of the First Presbyterian Church at Trenton for 30 years, from 1786 until his death.

Armstrong was admitted as an original member of The Society of the Cincinnati in the State of New Jersey in 1789 and served as Secretary of the New Jersey Society from 1790 to 1797. He was also a trustee of the College of New Jersey from 1790 until his death.

Religious titles
Preceded by Rev. James Hall	Moderator of the 16th General Assembly of the Presbyterian Church in the United States of America; 1804–1805	Succeeded by Rev. James Richards
