= Drury Lacy =

President of Hampden–Sydney College
- In office 1789–1797
- Preceded by: John Blair Smith
- Succeeded by: Archibald Alexander

Personal details
- Born: October 5, 1758 Chesterfield County, Virginia
- Died: December 6, 1815 (aged 57) Philadelphia
- Spouse: Ann Smith
- Children: Dr. Drury Lacy; Rev. William Sterling Lacy; Elizabeth Rice Lacy; Dr. Horace Lacy; Judith Lacy
- Education: B.A. Hampden–Sydney; M.A. Hampden–Sydney
- Profession: Theologian

Drury Lacy (October 5, 1758 – December 6, 1815) was a vice president and the acting president of Hampden–Sydney College from 1789 to 1797.

== Biography ==
Lacy was the youngest child born in 1758 to William Lacy (1713–1775), a farmer, and Elizabeth Rice (1715–1770), both of New Kent, Virginia. Lacy lost one of his hands as an adolescent and, as a result, spent his time studying the classical languages. In 1781 was offered the position of tutor at Hampden–Sydney College, which he accepted, serving in that capacity for some time; he studied theology under the preceptorship of Dr. John Blair Smith, president of Hampden–Sydney, was licensed to preach in September, 1787, and ordained in October, 1788, in which year he was elected vice president of the college. Upon Dr. Smith's resignation, in 1791, Lacy succeeded to the presidency, filling that position until 1797, when he tendered his resignation, which was accepted. He was the first Virginia-born president of Hampden–Sydney.

Lacy graduated several notable alumni from Hampden–Sydney. In 1789 he graduated William H. Cabell, Governor of Virginia and judge of Virginia Court of Appeals; and in 1791, U.S. Congressman James Jones, Kentucky Governor and Secretary of Treasury George M. Bibb, and University of Georgia President Moses Waddel.

During the remainder of his life he devoted his time and attention to supplying neighboring churches and also taught a classical school. Lacy also served as moderator of the general assembly of the Presbyterian Church in 1809, and as clerk of the Hanover Presbytery during the greater part of his ministry. He died in Philadelphia, Pennsylvania, December 6, 1815.

Lacy's son, Drury Lacy, Jr. was the third president of Davidson College in Davidson, North Carolina.

Academic offices
Preceded by John Blair Smith	President of Hampden–Sydney College; 1789—1797	Succeeded by Archibald Alexander
