= Henry Collin Minton =

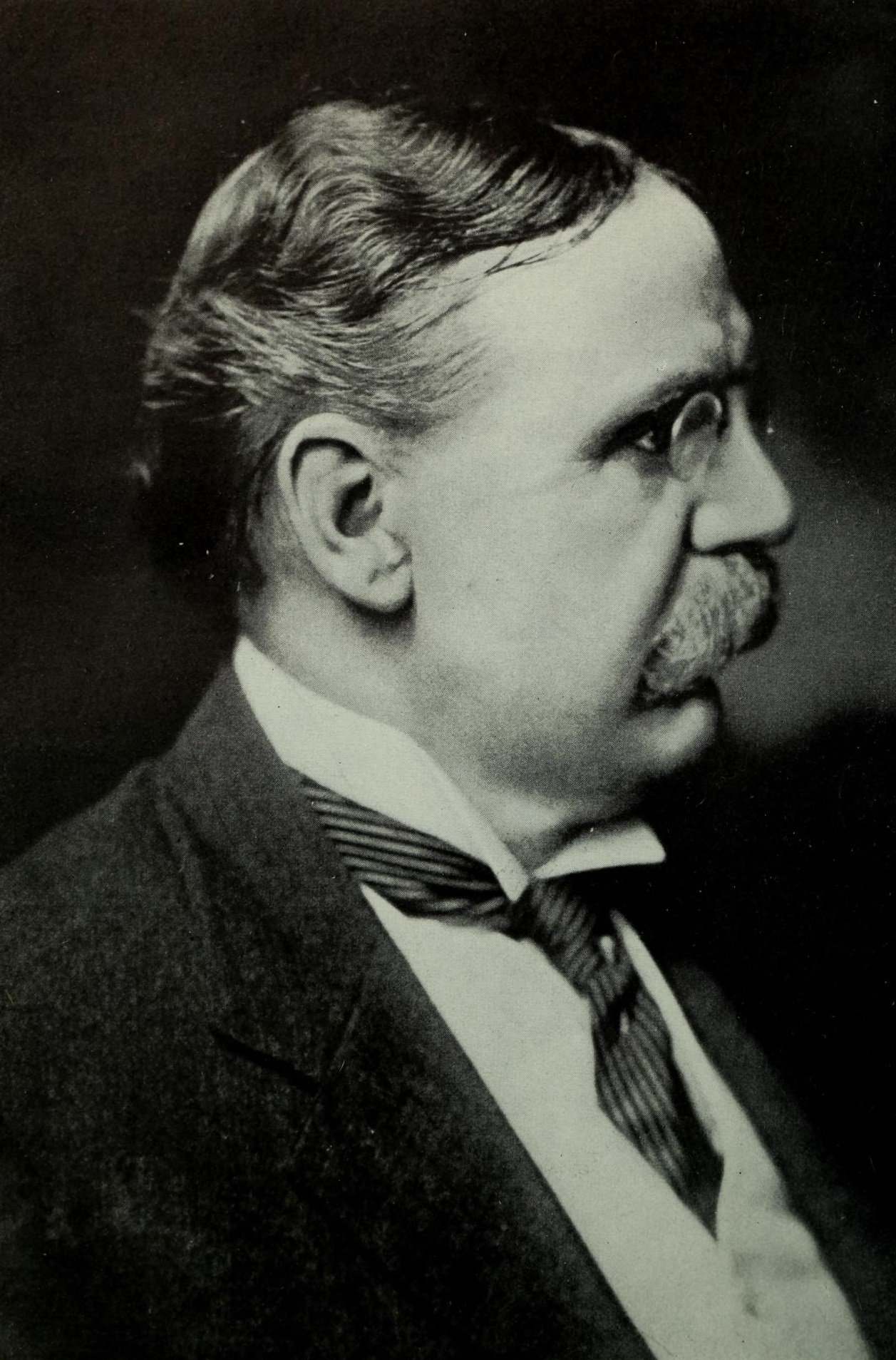
Minton circa 1913

Henry Collin Minton (1855–1924) was the chairman of Systematic Theology at the San Francisco Theological Seminary from December 2, 1891, to October 1, 1902. He then became the minister for the First Presbyterian Church in Trenton, New Jersey.

== Biography ==
He was born in Prosperity, Pennsylvania, and attended Washington and Jefferson College, where he received his received B.A. in 1879, his M.A. in 1882, his D.D. in 1892, and his LL.D. in 1902. He graduated from the Western Theological Seminary in 1882 and was licensed in 1881 by the Presbytery of Washington, Pennsylvania. He was ordained in June 1882 by the Presbytery of St. Paul, Minnesota. He was Pastor of the First Church of Duluth, Minnesota from 1882 to 1883, and Pastor-elect of Second Church, Baltimore, Maryland, in 1882. He moved to California in 1884 and was Pastor of the First Presbyterian Church, San Jose, 1885–1891; Pastor-elect of Saint John's Church, San Francisco, 1891–1893; and Pastor of the First Presbyterian Church in Trenton, New Jersey in 1902.
