= Broad Street National Bank =

- U.S. National Register of Historic Places
- U.S. Historic district – Contributing property
- New Jersey Register of Historic Places
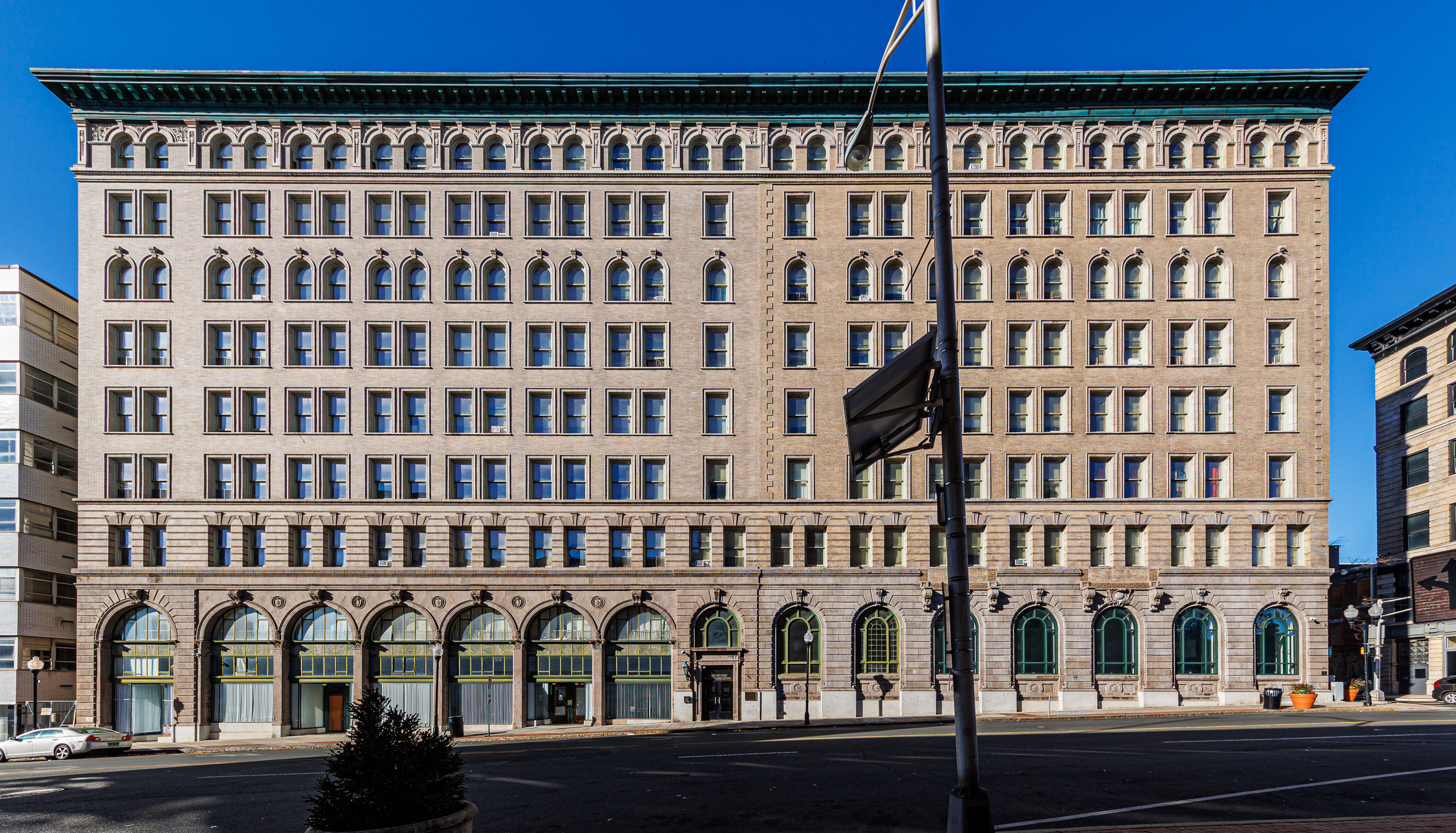
- Montgomery Street facade

- Location within Mercer County, New Jersey Location within New Jersey Location within the United States
- Location: 143 East State Street, Trenton, New Jersey
- Coordinates: 40°13′11.7″N 74°45′43.4″W
- Built: 1900
- Architect: William A. Poland
- Architectural style: Skyscraper
- Part of: Downtown Trenton Commercial Historic District (ID100011495)
- NRHP reference No.: 07001404
- NJRHP No.: 4731

Significant dates
- Added to NRHP: January 17, 2008
- Designated CP: March 10, 2025
- Designated NJRHP: September 20, 2007

The Broad Street National Bank building is located at 143 East State Street in the city of Trenton in Mercer County, New Jersey, United States. It was built in 1900 and added to the National Register of Historic Places on January 17, 2008, for its significance in architecture and commerce. The building was the first skyscraper in the city. It was added as a contributing property to the Downtown Trenton Commercial Historic District on March 10, 2025.

== History and description ==
The Broad Street National Bank was organized in 1887 and Oliver Otis Bowman became its president, leading its development. The architect William A. Poland finished the design of the new bank building in 1899. Construction of the original eight-story building was completed in 1900. The bank added a thirteen-story addition in 1913 and an eight-story addition in 1924. It was built using steel frames with walls of brick and terra cotta. The bank sold the building c. 1962.

== See also ==
- National Register of Historic Places listings in Mercer County, New Jersey
