= List of Lake Forest College people =

== Notable people ==
This list contains people associated with Lake Forest College in Lake Forest, Illinois, including current and former college presidents, as well as notable alumni and faculty members.

== Alumni ==
=== Academia ===
- Richard J. Ablin, class of 1961, professor of pathology at the University of Arizona College of Medicine
- Hill, Walter A., class of 1968, professor and Dean of the College of Agriculture, Environment and Nutrition Sciences at Tuskegee University
- Sig Gissler, class of 1956, professor of journalism at Columbia University
- Philip Klinkner, class of 1985, James S. Sherman professor of government at Hamilton College
- William Mather Lewis, class of 1900, former president of George Washington University and Lafayette College
- Ralph J. Mills Jr., class of 1954, professor of English at the University of Illinois at Chicago
- Edward Wingenbach, class of 1991, president of Hampshire College, former acting president and dean of faculty at Ripon College

=== Arts and entertainment ===
- Richard Armstrong, class of 1971, director of the Solomon R. Guggenheim Museum and Foundation
- Blair Butler, class of 1999, stand-up comedian and television host
- Allan Carr, class of 1958, producer of the film Grease and Broadway's La Cage aux Folles, Tony Award winner
- Kahil El'Zabar, class of 1977, musician and composer
- Shea Farrell, class of 1980, actor (known for 1980s soap opera, Hotel) and producer
- Scott Goldstein, class of 1971, Emmy Award-winning producer, writer, and director (L.A. Law, Doogie Howser, M.D., Today Show)
- Steve Goodman, class of 1970, Grammy Award-winning folk singer, writer of "Go, Cubs, Go" and "City of New Orleans"
- Kelly Leonard, class of 1988, producer at Second City
- Colin McComb, class of 1991, writer and game designer
- Natalia Nogulich, class of 1971, actress, writer, professor, and director
- Ian Punnett, class of 1982, broadcaster, author, and Episcopal deacon
- Penelope Rosemont, class of 1964, surrealist movement visual artist, writer, and publisher
- Win Stracke, ex-class of 1931, folk musician and co-founder of the Old Town School of Folk Music
- Richard Widmark, class of 1936, popular post-WWII era actor, "the face of film noir"

=== Athletics ===
- Herb Alward, football player and football coach
- John Biolo, class of 1938, NFL player and football coach
- Mush Crawford, professional football, basketball, and baseball player, football coach
- Ernie Krueger, class of 1915, professional baseball player
- E. J. Mather, class of 1910, football and basketball player, football coach
- Diana Nyad, class of 1973, world-record distance swimmer, national squash player, author, journalist, and motivational speaker
- John H. Rice, class of 1895, football and baseball player, football coach, and athletic director
- Andy Russo, class of 1970, basketball player and coach
- Casey Urlacher, class of 2003, professional football player and mayor of Mettawa, Illinois
- Robbie Ventura, class of 1992, professional racing cyclist, hockey player
- Joe Zemaitis, class of 2002, professional triathlete

=== Business ===
- Dave Beran, class of 2003, James Beard award-winning chef, owner of Dialogue in Santa Monica, California
- Nate Berkus, class of 1994, award-winning interior designer and decorator, New York Times bestselling author, movie producer, and host of The Nate Berkus Show
- Chester R. Davis, class of 1917, businessman, assistant secretary to the U.S. Army, Vice-President of the Association of the U.S. Army
- James C. Foster, class of 1972, chairman, CEO, and President of Charles River Laboratories, Inc., 2003 Forbes Entrepreneur of the Year
- Grace Groner, class of 1931, philanthropist and secretary at Abbott Laboratories
- Rob Mermin, class of 1971, author, founder of award-winning international touring company Circus Smirkus
- Nicholas J. Pritzker, class of 1969, Chairman of the Board and CEO of the Hyatt Development Corporation, co-founder and co-chair of Clean Energy Trust, member of the Pritzker family

=== Engineering and science ===
- Richard J. Ablin, class of 1961, notable for his work on tests for prostate cancer screening
- Walter A. Hill, class of 1968, agricultural scientist, notable for his work on sweet potato crops
- William Mather Lewis, class of 1900, American teacher, university president, local politician, and state and national government official
- William Duncan MacMillan, attended Lake Forest College in 1889, made notable contributions in astronomy and mathematics
- Aaron Swartz, computer programmer, entrepreneur, writer, political organizer, and Internet hacktivist

=== Government and politics ===
- Marsha E. Barnes, class of 1969, U.S. Ambassador to Suriname and U.S. State Department official
- Victor deGrazia, class of 1954, political strategist, former campaign manager and deputy to Illinois governor Dan Walker, successful jury consultant
- Edward J. FitzSimons, class of 1962, Mayor of Mettawa, Illinois and lawyer
- Homer Galpin, Illinois State Senator and lawyer
- Susan Garrett, class of 1994, former Illinois State Senator for the 29th District and 59th district in the House of Representatives
- George E.Q. Johnson, class of 1900, United States Attorney who successfully prosecuted Al Capone for tax evasion, Judge of the United States District Court for the Northern District of Illinois
- Otto Kerner Sr., class of 1905, Judge of the United States Court of Appeals for the Seventh Circuit, Attorney General of Illinois
- Rick Kolowski, class of 1966, Nebraska State Senator and educator
- Peg Lautenschlager, class of 1977, attorney, former Attorney General of Wisconsin, first woman elected to be Attorney General in Wisconsin
- Haig Paravonian, class of 1956, mayor of Waukegan from 1989 to 1993
- Frank Richman, class of 1904, Justice of the Indiana Supreme Court, judge at the Nuremberg trials
- Adolph J. Sabath, class of 1891, attorney, member of the U.S. House of Representatives
- Edward J. Smejkal, class of 1895, Illinois State Representative and lawyer
- Trent Van Haaften, class of 1987, Indiana State Representative, 2010 Democratic nominee for Congress in Indiana's 8th district

=== Religion ===
- John Wilbur Chapman, class of 1879, Presbyterian evangelist
- Lloyd John Ogilvie, class of 1952, Presbyterian minister, former United States Senate Chaplain

=== Writers, journalists and publishers ===
- Herbert Block, ex-class of 1932, political cartoonist and three-time Pulitzer Prize winner
- Jacqueline Carey, class of 1986, New York Times bestselling fantasy fiction author
- Carolyn Crimi, class of 1982, children's book writer
- Andrea Day, class of 1987, reporter at WNYW-FOX 5 New York City until 2011, winner of three Emmy Awards
- John Thomson Faris, class of 1892, author, editor, and clergyman
- Sig Gissler, class of 1956, professor, administrator of the Pulitzer Prize from 2002-2014, former editor of the Milwaukee Journal Sentinel
- Ed Janus, class of 1968, independent audio producer, interviewer, and journalist
- Ralph J. Mills, class of 1954, acclaimed American poet, scholar, and professor
- Delavan Smith, Trustee 1897-1906, publisher of the Indianapolis News from 1899-1922
- Bob Verdi, class of 1967, Chicago Blackhawks historian, Elmer Ferguson Memorial Award winner

== Coaches ==
- John W. Breen
- Ira T. Carrithers
- Sylvester Derby
- Ralph Glaze
- Clarence Herschberger
- Ed Hughes
- Ralph Jones
- Wally Lemm
- Ralph Thacker

== Faculty ==
- Warder Clyde Allee
- Robert Archambeau
- Alan Axelrod
- James Mark Baldwin
- Joseph Carens
- Mihaly Csikszentmihalyi
- Elizabeth Teter Lunn
- Rebecca Makkai, writer and author of The Great Believers, which was shortlisted for the National Book Award
- Elizabeth Marquardt
- Janet McCracken
- Charles A. Miller
- Ronald Miller
- Ahmad Sadri
- Fernando Sanford
- Davis Schneiderman
- Lawrence M. Schoen
- Stephen D. Schutt
- Robert Pelton Sibley
- David Spadafora
- Holly Swyers, author of Wrigley Regulars: Finding Community in the Bleachers.
- Gerald Vizenor, Native American writer, activist, academic, and literary critic

== Presidents ==
- Robert Wilson Patterson Sr., 1875 August-1878 March
- John Haskell Hewitt (Acting President), 1878 Spring
- Daniel S. Gregory, 1878 circa June-1886 Spring
- William C. Roberts, 1886 Fall-1892 Spring
- John M. Coulter, 1893 June-1896 circa March
- John J. Halsey (Acting President), 1896 circa March-1897 June and 1906 December-1907 April
- James Gore King McClure, 1897 Fall-1901 Spring (and Acting President 1892 Fall-1893 Spring)
- Richard D. Harlan, 1901 Fall-1906 November
- John S. Nollen, 1907 April-1917 December
- Henry Wilkes Wright (Acting President), 1918 January-1920 Spring
- Herbert M. Moore, 1920 Fall-1942 February
- Ernest A. Johnson, 1942 Spring-1959 April
- John R. Howard (Acting President), 1959 April-1960 June
- William L. Dunn (Acting President), 1960 July-August and 1969 Fall-1970 Spring
- William Graham Cole, 1960 September-1969 August
- Eugene Hotchkiss III, 1970 September-1993 Spring
- David Spadafora, 1993 July-2001 Spring
- Stephen D. Schutt, 2001 July-2022 Spring
- Jill M. Baren, 2022 July-2024 December
- Robert Krebs, (Interim President) 2024 December-2025 Spring
- Michael J. Sosulski, August 2025-present

== Fictional ==
- Bree Van de Kamp and her husband Rex in Desperate Housewives both attended Lake Forest College
