= Herbert Moore =

Herbert Moore may refer to:

- Herbert Moore (footballer)
- Herbert Moore (rugby union)
- Herbert M. Moore (professor)

== See also ==
- J. Herbert Moore House, Poplar Bluff, Butler County, Missouri
