= Walter Hill (disambiguation) =

Walter Hill (born 1942) is an American film director.

Walter Hill may also refer to:

== People ==
- Walter Hill (garden curator) (1820–1904), Scottish-born Australian botanist, founder of Brisbane Botanic Gardens
- Walter A. Hill (born 1946), American agricultural scientist
- Walter Barnard Hill (1851–1905), American lawyer, Chancellor of the University of Georgia 1889–1905
- Walter Hill (footballer) (before 1891–after 1899), English footballer
- Walter Hill (British Army officer) (1877–1942), British soldier, Colonel of the Royal Fusiliers
- Walter Hill (sportscaster) (1928–2014), American sportscaster
- Walter Hill (serial killer) (1935–1997), American serial killer executed in Alabama
- Walter Newell Hill (1889–1955), American Medal of Honor recipient
- Walter Hill Jr. (1949–2008), scholar, historian and archivist

== Places ==
- Walter Hill, Queensland, a locality in the Cassowary Coast Region, Australia
- Walterhill, Tennessee, census-designated place in Rutherford County, Tennessee

== Other uses ==
- Filmworks II: Music for an Untitled Film by Walter Hill, an album of music by John Zorn not used in the movie Trespass
- Hill (surname)
