= William C. Roberts (pastor) =

American pastor and academic administrator (1832–1903)

The Reverend William C. Roberts
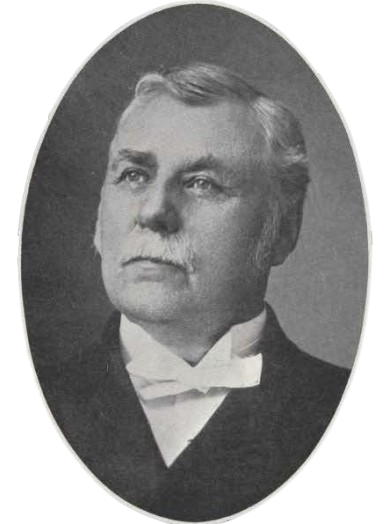
- Roberts c. 1903

9th President of Centre College
- In office June 8, 1898 – November 27, 1903
- Preceded by: William C. Young
- Succeeded by: Frederick W. Hinitt

3rd President of Lake Forest University
- In office c. October 1886 – February 26, 1892
- Preceded by: Daniel Gregory
- Succeeded by: John Merle Coulter

Personal details
- Born: September 22, 1832 Aberystwyth, Wales
- Died: November 27, 1903 (aged 71) Danville, Kentucky, U.S.
- Resting place: Evergreen Cemetery
- Spouse: Mary Louise Fuller (m. 1858)
- Children: 3
- Education: Princeton University; Princeton Theological Seminary

William Charles Roberts (September 22, 1832 – November 27, 1903) was a Welsh American pastor and academic administrator. A graduate of Princeton University and Princeton Theological Seminary, he began his ministerial career at a Presbyterian church in Wilmington, Delaware. He spent nearly two years pastoring in Columbus, Ohio, before his wife developed an illness and the couple were advised to return to her home state of New Jersey, where Roberts continued preaching. He led churches in Elizabeth, New Jersey, for the following eighteen years before a four-year stint with the Presbyterian Church in the United States of America (PCUSA) Board of Home Missions. He then was elected president of Lake Forest College in Lake Forest, Illinois, where he stayed for six years. During this period, he was elected moderator of the PCUSA General Assembly. After six more years working for the PCUSA, Roberts accepted the presidency of Centre College, in Danville, Kentucky, in 1898. He spent five years leading Centre before dying in office in November 1903; he presided over Centre's 1901 merger with Central University in Richmond, Kentucky, and finished his term as president of the consolidated Central University of Kentucky.

== Early life and education ==
William Charles Roberts was born on September 22, 1832, in Aberystwyth, Wales. He graduated from Princeton University in 1855 and then from Princeton Theological Seminary three years later.

== Career ==
Roberts began his ministerial career as pastor of the First Presbyterian Church in Wilmington, Delaware, shortly following his graduation from Princeton Seminary in 1858. He preached there for four years and delivered his farewell sermon on October 26, 1862, before departing to preach at First Presbyterian Church in Columbus, Ohio, a position he had accepted several weeks earlier. During this period, Roberts's wife developed an illness which was considered to be "incurable in [that] climate", according to the Daily Ohio Statesman, and doctors recommended she return to her home state of New Jersey. As a result, Roberts and his wife left Columbus in late 1864 and moved to Elizabeth, New Jersey, where he became pastor of the Second Presbyterian Church. Shortly before leaving Ohio, Roberts conducted the funeral services for Samuel Medary, the final territorial governor of Minnesota. Roberts preached in Elizabeth for eighteen years—until 1866 at the Second Presbyterian Church and from then until 1882 at the Westminster Presbyterian Church. He left Westminster to become a secretary of the Presbyterian Church in the United States of America (PCUSA) Board of Home Missions, a position he held until 1886.

Roberts became president of Lake Forest University—now Lake Forest College—in Lake Forest, Illinois, in 1886. He accepted the position in September of that year and officially took office by the end of the year. (Note: The Chicago Tribune reported on September 28, 1886, that Roberts had accepted the presidency and that he "will probably enter upon his duties some time in October".) He took the job with several stipulations, namely that the school's "resources" be increased by $1 million (equivalent to $36 million in 2025) over the course of the next five years. He was officially inaugurated on June 22, 1887. After this plan stalled in its second year and the payments became delayed, Roberts lost faith in the school's ability to implement the policy and ultimately resigned effective February 26, 1892. During his term at Lake Forest, Roberts was elected moderator of the PCUSA General Assembly in 1889.

After leaving Lake Forest, Roberts returned to New York to become the senior secretary of the Presbyterian Board of Missions, where he stayed from 1892 to 1898. He was offered the presidency of Centre College by a five-person committee of the school's Board of Trustees some time before June 7, 1898, with the full board confirming his election the following day. Roberts attended the June 8 meeting to accept the presidency. Centre's presidency had become vacant following the death of William C. Young in September 1896, and Roberts succeeded John C. Fales, the dean of faculty who had been acting as interim president in the intervening period.

In addition to improving the college grounds and the landscaping of the campus, Roberts oversaw Centre's consolidation with Central University, located in Richmond, Kentucky. After it was determined that Centre fell under the jurisdiction of the PCUSA (the "Northern Presbyterian Church"), Central was chartered in 1873 under the auspices of the Presbyterian Church in the United States (PCUS; the "Southern Presbyterian Church"). From its outset, Central had faced problems with finances and enrollment, both of which had worsened with time. As a result, the colleges consolidated, with the Southern Presbyterian Synod formally approving the move on April 23, 1901, and the Central Alumni Association doing the same on June 18. The consolidated school began the 1901–1902 academic year as Central University of Kentucky, located in Danville, with Roberts as its president. Lindsay Hughes Blanton, the chancellor of Central at the time of consolidation, became the vice president of the joint institution and remained in that position until 1907. The school later reverted to the name "Centre College of Kentucky" on December 17, 1918.

== Personal life and death ==
Roberts married Mary Louise Fuller on October 19, 1858. The couple had three children, two of whom survived to adulthood.

During his lifetime, Roberts received two honorary degrees from his alma mater; he was made Doctor of Letters in 1887 and Doctor of Sacred Theology in 1892.

Roberts died in office at 3:40 p.m. on November 27, 1903, in Danville. The cause of death was reported as paralysis. His funeral was scheduled for November 30, 1903. Two days following his death, Central's Board of Trustees announced that they would delay the search for his replacement by several months; John C. Fales served another term as interim president before Frederick W. Hinitt was elected to succeed Roberts.

== Notes ==
Academic offices
Preceded by Daniel Gregory	President of Lake Forest University; 1886 — 1892	Succeeded by John Merle Coulter
Preceded by William C. Young	President of Centre College; 1898 — 1903	Succeeded by Frederick W. Hinitt
Religious titles
Preceded by Charles L. Thompson	Moderator of the General Assembly of the Presbyterian Church in the United States of America; 1889	Succeeded by William Eves Moore
