= Henry Wilkes Wright =

American philosopher and psychologist (1879–1959)

Henry Wilkes Wright, 1907

Henry Wilkes Wright (August 16, 1879 – August 4, 1959) was a professor of philosophy and psychology and the Acting President of Lake Forest College from January 1918 to May 1920.

== Early life and education ==
Henry W. Wright was born on August 16, 1879, to a Canadian mother and American father in St. James, Michigan on Beaver Island in Lake Michigan. His parents ran a dry goods store in Harbor Springs, Michigan. He attended high school at Alma Academy.

Wright married Cecelia Evelyn Morgan on September 4, 1903, in Grand Rapids, Michigan. The couple had three sons; Sherman, Henry Jr., and Morgan; and one daughter, Dee.

In 1889, Wright received his bachelor's degree with a major in philosophy from Cornell University in Ithaca, New York, writing his thesis on "Locke's theory of knowledge." He was a member of the Sigma Alpha Epsilon fraternity. In 1904, he received his PhD also from Cornell, writing his dissertation on "The laws of evolution as applied to certain aspects of self-conscious experience." He received an honorary doctor of laws degree from the University of Manitoba in 1952.

== Career ==
From 1903 to 1907, Wright worked as instructor of philosophy at his alma mater, Cornell University. He held a Sage Fellowship in Philosophy.

In Fall 1907, Wright was hired as professor and head of the philosophy department at Lake Forest College in Lake Forest, Illinois. He remained at Lake Forest for 13 years. He was a founder of the students' Philosophy Club in 1913. In May 1916, the student newspaper The Stentor reported on his month-long hospitalization with scarlet fever. Wright served as the college's Acting President from January 1918 until his resignation in May 1920, between the terms of John S. Nollen and Herbert M. Moore. Wright continued teaching during this time, including a "War Issues" class in Spring 1919, regarding the philosophic backgrounds of the nations involved in World War I. As Acting President, Wright refused to fire from the faculty English professor Warder Clyde Allee when Allee declared his pacifism as a Quaker; he oversaw the establishment of a Student Army Training Corps on campus in September 1918, and its subsequent demobilization that December, and as a final act in May 1920, banned the playing of music on campus after 11 PM. At Lake Forest he served as faculty advisor to the Men's Discussion Club. He and his wife Cecelia hosted meetings of the YMCA, the Philosophy Club, and the University Club at their home on campus.

In 1920, Wright was hired to lead the psychology department of the University of Manitoba in Winnipeg, Canada, where he remained for 30 years. After retiring from Manitoba in 1950, Wright taught psychology at Waterloo College. He contributed articles to Encyclopedia Americana, The Philosophical Review, International Journal of Ethics, Journal of Philosophy, and American Journal of Theology.

Wright was a member of the Trinity United Church, the American Philosophical Association, the Western Philosophical Association, and the American Association for the Advancement of Science. He was politically aligned with the Progressive Party. He served as president of the Canadian Psychological Society. Wright and his family spent summers in Omena, Michigan.

Wright passed away at age 79 on August 4, 1959, in Kitchener, Ontario and is buried in Woodland Cemetery, in London, Ontario.

== Works ==
- Self-Realization; an Outline of Ethics, Henry Holt and Company, 1913
- Faith justified by progress: lectures delivered before Lake Forest College on the foundation of the late William Bross, Scribners, 1916
- The Moral Standards of Democracy, D. Appleton & Company, 1925
- The Religious Response; an Introduction to the Philosophy of Religion, Harper & Brothers, 1929
