= Žemaitis (disambiguation) =

Žemaitis is a Lithuanian family name.

- LKL Zemaitis, Lithuianian warship, formerly HDMS Flyvefisken (P550)
- 31859 Zemaitis, minor planet
- General Jonas Žemaitis Military Academy of Lithuania
