= John J. Halsey =

John J. Halsey, 1901

John Julius Halsey (November 23, 1848 – May 29, 1919) was an author, educator, and twice the Acting President of Lake Forest College, from March 1896 to June 1897 June and December 1906 to April 1907.

== Early life and education ==
John J. Halsey was born on November 23, 1848, in Louisville, Kentucky, to parents Caroline Anderson and Rev. Leroy J. Halsey. He had three siblings: Martha or "Mattie," Edward, and Leroy. The family moved to Chicago, Illinois, in 1859.

In 1870, he received his bachelor's degree from the University of Chicago, and three years later in 1873, he received his master's degree from the same. In 1897, Centre College in Kentucky awarded him an honorary degree of Doctor of Laws.

In 1885, Halsey married Elizabeth B. Gardner of Faribault, Minnesota. They had one daughter, Katherine.

== Career as educator ==
After completing his studies, he taught at the University of Chicago for a year, and briefly was a journalist reporting for the Chicago Tribune and the Chicago Inter Ocean (1880–1882). He also worked for conveyancing businesses S.B. Chase & Co. and Handy, Simmons & Co.

John J. Halsey was a professor of political science and English Lake Forest College in Lake Forest, Illinois from 1878 to 1889, and from 1889 – May 1918 he was D. K. Pearson Professor of Political and Social Science. He served as the college's Acting President twice, from 1896 March-1897 June after the resignation of John M. Coulter and before the hiring of James G. K. McClure, and again from 1906 December-1907 April after the resignation of Richard D. Harlan and before the hiring of John S. Nollen. He was Dean of the Faculty of Lake Forest College from 1899 to 1901. In 1901, he was granted a year's leave of absence to head the Department of Economics of Stanford University in California. In 1912, he co-authored and published a history of Lake County, Illinois.

Halsey was an alderman of the Lake Forest City Council from 1893 to 1896, President of the Library Board from 1898 to 1901, Chairman of the Board of Education from 1903 to 1907, and President of the Township High School Board in 1912. He was a member of the national associations of History, International Law, Political Science, Economics, Geography and Forestry, and of the Mississippi Valley and South Carolina Historical Societies. He was an elder in the Presbyterian Church for more than 20 years. Before his passing, Halsey spoke in support of women's suffrage.

Halsey died at age 70 on May 29, 1919, in Winnetka, Illinois, and was buried in Lake Forest Cemetery. Six hundred people were reported to have attended his memorial services, and all businesses in Lake Forest closed for one hour to pay respect to his memory. A Lake Forest elementary school originally named West School was renamed John J. Halsey School.
