= Michael Anania =

American poet, novelist, essayist and public speaker

- Born: August 5, 1939; Omaha, Nebraska
- Occupations: Poet, novelist, and essayist
- Writing career
- Notable work: Red Menace

Michael Anania (August 5, 1939) is an American poet, novelist, and essayist. His modernist poetry meticulously evokes Midwestern prairies and rivers. His autobiographical novel, Red Menace, captured mid-twentieth century cold war angst and the colloquial speech of Nebraska, while the voice in his volumes of poetry distinctively reflects rural and urban Midwestern life in a "mixture of personal voice, historical fact, journalistic observation and a haiku-like format that pares lines down to the bare bones and pushes language to its limit."

== Biography ==
Anania was born in Omaha, Nebraska. He grew up in a housing project and attended inner-city public schools in Omaha. He studied first at the University of Nebraska at Lincoln, and then completed his BA at the Municipal University of Omaha (now University of Nebraska Omaha).

Seeking to work with the archives of the works of poet William Carlos Williams, Anania pursued graduate work in the 1960s at SUNY Buffalo. While in New York state he taught for a year at SUNY Fredonia. He left New York in 1965 to teach for three years at Northwestern University before being hired at the University of Illinois at Chicago, where with Ralph J. Mills, Jr. he was one of the founding members of the Program for Writers in the UIC English Department. Anania served as the director of the program starting in 1973. He is now an emeritus professor at UIC.

In 1960 Anania married Joanne Oliver, a specialist in adult literacy who taught in public schools in Nebraska, New York, and Illinois and later at Governors State University.

Besides his work as a creative writing professor, Anania was also influential as an editor, serving as the poetry editor for Audit and for Partisan Review, as the poetry and literary editor of The Swallow Press, as a contributing editor to Tri-Quarterly and VENUE, as well as serving on the boards of Wesleyan University Press, Prairie State Editions of the University of Illinois Press, Thunder's Mouth Press, Encyclopedia of Chicago History, and Dalkey Archive Press. His papers from the 1950s through 2015 are archived at the University of Chicago Library.

== Awards ==
Friends of Literature Poetry Prize (1970)

Awarded a Roadstead Fellowship (1970–1972)

Best Short Stories (1979)

Pushcart Prize V: Best of the Small Presses (1980)

Illinois Arts Council Fellowship in Fiction (1980)

Five-time winner of Illinois Arts Council Literary Awards (1974–1989)

National Magazine Award (1981)

Illinois Association of Teachers of English, Author of the Year (1985)

Midwest Independent Booksellers Association Award, Best Paperback Novel (for The Red Menace) (1994)

Charles T. Angoff Award for Poetry (2008)

Works by and about Anania were collected in a special themed issue of Valley Voices: A Literary Review in 2016.

== Key publications ==
=== Poetry ===
The Color of Dust. Swallow Press, 1970.

Riversongs. University of Illinois Press, 1978.

The Sky at Ashland. 1986.

Selected Poems. 1994.

Natural Light. 1999.

Heat Lines. Asphodel Press, 2005.

Continuous Showings. MadHat Press, 2017.

=== Fiction ===
The Red Menace: A Fiction. 1984. Thunder's Mouth Press.

=== Essays ===
"Of living belfry and rampart: On American literary magazines since 1950." TriQuarterly, Fall 1978. 43:6-27.

In Plain Sight: Obsessions, Morals and Domestic Laughter. 1991. Moyer Bell.

“Messing about in Boats: A Plan B Essay.” Ploughshares. 2011. Volume 37, Number 4, Winter 2011. pp. 151–155.

“When Buffalo Became Buffalo.” Plume: Issue #67 February 2017.
