= Ananias Club =

Public figures that Theodore Roosevelt accused of dishonesty

The Ananias Club was a euphemism used by American press in 1906–07 during the administration of President Theodore Roosevelt, to refer to public figures that the President accused of dishonesty. The press employed the euphemism to avoid printing the word "liar."

== Origins ==
The first recorded use of the word was employed by the press in 1906 to avoid the "short and ugly word" (liar) in connection with the "mutual accusations of inveracity" which arose between President Theodore Roosevelt and Senator Benjamin Tillman of South Carolina over the railroad rate bill. The phrase was adopted to describe any person President Roosevelt accused of dishonesty. The name derived from the story of Ananias, who fell dead when he lied to the apostle Peter about a financial transaction.

== Members ==
- So-called "nature fakers"
- Congressman Butler Ames
- Banker Wharton Barker
- Industrialist Henry Melville Whitney
- Newspaper publisher Delavan Smith
- Former Senator William E. Chandler
- Newspaper publisher Joseph Pulitzer

== Later uses ==
Franklin D. Roosevelt used the expression "Ananias Club" in his first press conference as President of the United States in reference to his policy on the use of background material provided by the White House:

Then there are two other matters we will talk about: The first is "background information", which means material which can be used by all of you on your own authority and responsibility, not to be attributed to the White House, because I do not want to have to revive the Ananias Club.

== See also ==
- Richard Nixon's enemies list
- Donald Trump's conflict with the news media
