= Leroy J. Halsey =

Leroy Jones Halsey
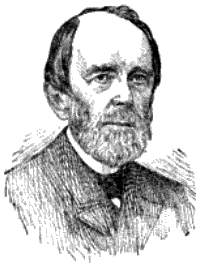
- Born: January 28, 1812; Richmond, Virginia
- Died: June 18, 1896 (aged 84); Chicago, Illinois
- Resting place: Rosehill Cemetery
- Education: University of Nashville
- Occupations: Preacher; Author
- Relatives: Henry F. Halsey (brother) John J. Halsey (son)

Leroy Jones Halsey (1812-1896) was an American Presbyterian scholar and author.

== Biography ==
=== Early life ===
Leroy J. Halsey was born near Richmond, Virginia on January 28, 1812. He graduated from the University of Nashville in 1834.

=== Career ===
He worked as a professor of Historical and Pastoral Theology at the McCormick Theological Seminary in Chicago.

Although he was living in Chicago during the American Civil War of 1861–1865, he was directly affected by the war through his direct family. Indeed, in a letter addressed to Andrew Johnson (1808-1875), who served as the 17th President of the United States from 1865 to 1869, sent on September 26, 1865, Presbyterian minister David Xavier Junkin (1808-1880) explained that Leroy's brother, Henry F. Halsey (1815-1887), had been ruined by Union troops, who took over his factory in Alabama. As a result, Leroy was the only one left to support his brother's family in the vanquished South. Junkin asked Johnson to have the factory returned to Henry Halsey, making it possible for him to earn his livelihood again.

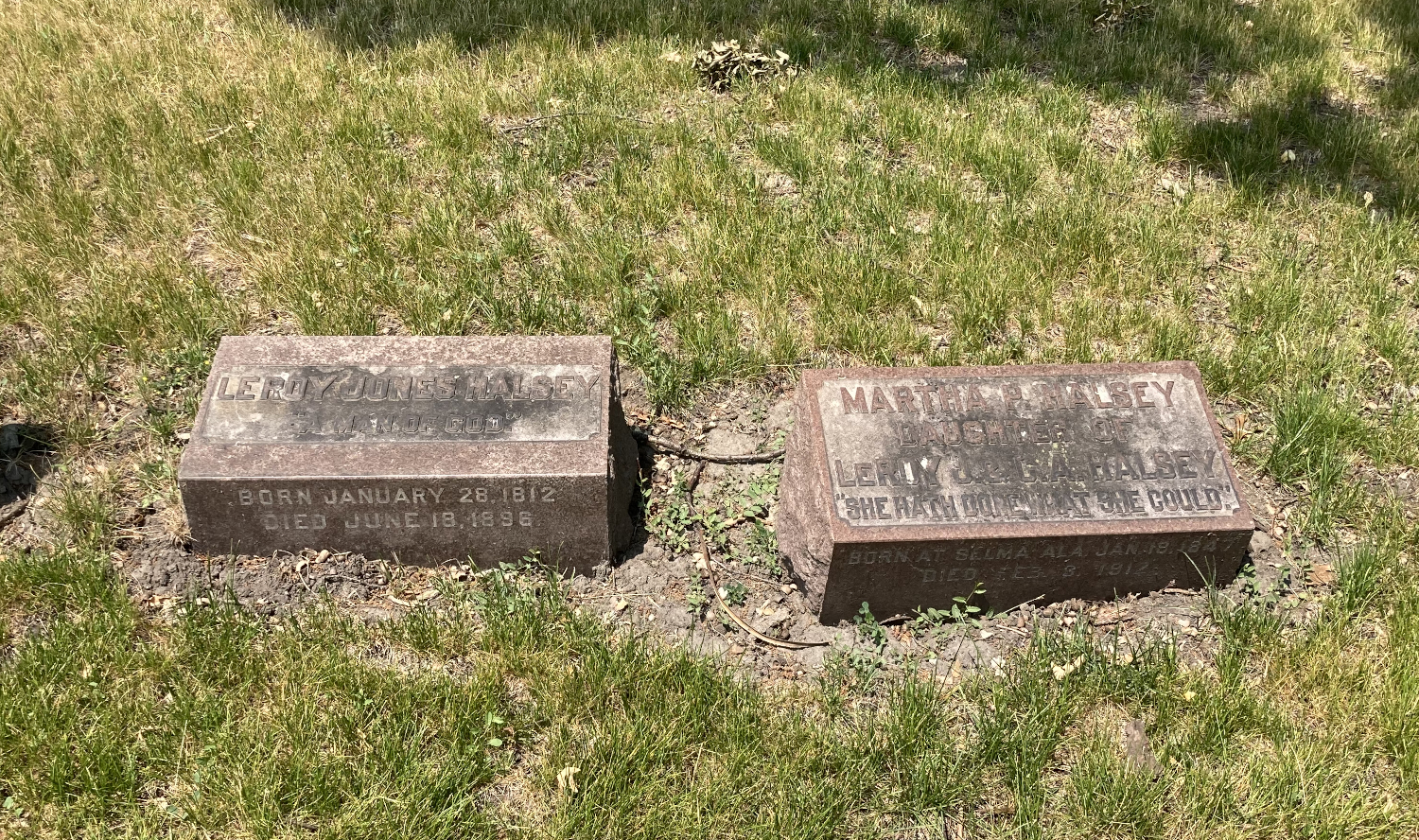
Halsey's grave at Rosehill Cemetery

He is credited for first coining the sobriquet "Athens of the South" to refer to Nashville. The phrase was later promoted by Reverend Philip Lindsley (1786–1855), a Presbyterian minister who founded the University of Nashville. He went on to edit a volume of Lindsley's publications. Additionally, he wrote a memoir about Reverend Lewis W. Green (1806-1863), another Presbyterian minister who served as the President of Hampden-Sydney College from 1849 to 1856, of Transylvania University from 1856 to 1857, and of Centre College from 1857 to 1863.

=== Death ===
He died at his home in Chicago on June 18, 1896, and was buried at Rosehill Cemetery.

== Bibliography ==
=== As an author ===
- The Literary Attractions of the Bible (R. & R. Clark, 1858).
- A Sketch of the Life and Educational Labors of Philip Lindsley, D.D., Late President of the University of Nashville (1859).
- The Beauty of Immanuel (1860).
- Memoir of the Life and Character of Reverend Lewis Warner Green, D.D., With a Selection From His Sermons (New York, 1871).
- Scotland's influence on civilization (1885).

=== As an editor ===
- The Works of P. Lindsley. Edited by Le Roy J. Halsey. With Introductory Notices of His Life and Labours. (1866).
