= Oliver Typewriter Company =

American typewriter manufacturer

The Oliver Typewriter Company
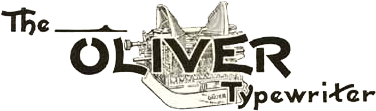
- Company type: Private
- Industry: Typewriter manufacturing
- Founded: 1895; 131 years ago
- Founder: Thomas Oliver
- Defunct: 1928
- Fate: Dissolved
- Successor: British Oliver Typewriter Company
- Headquarters: Chicago, Illinois, United States
- Area served: United States
- Key people: Thomas Oliver (namesake/inventor); Delavan Smith (vice president)
- Products: See Typewriters section
- Number of employees: 875

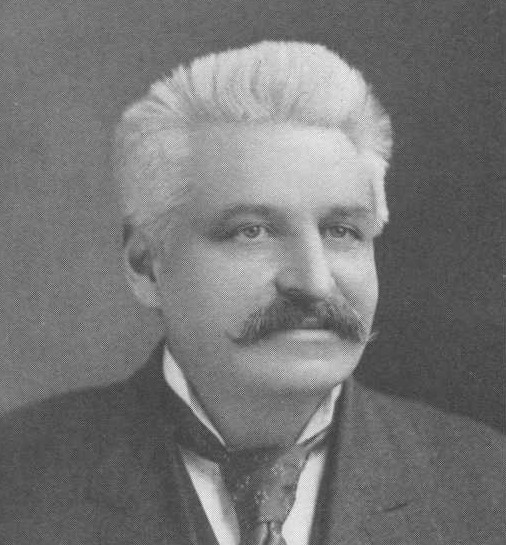
Thomas Oliver

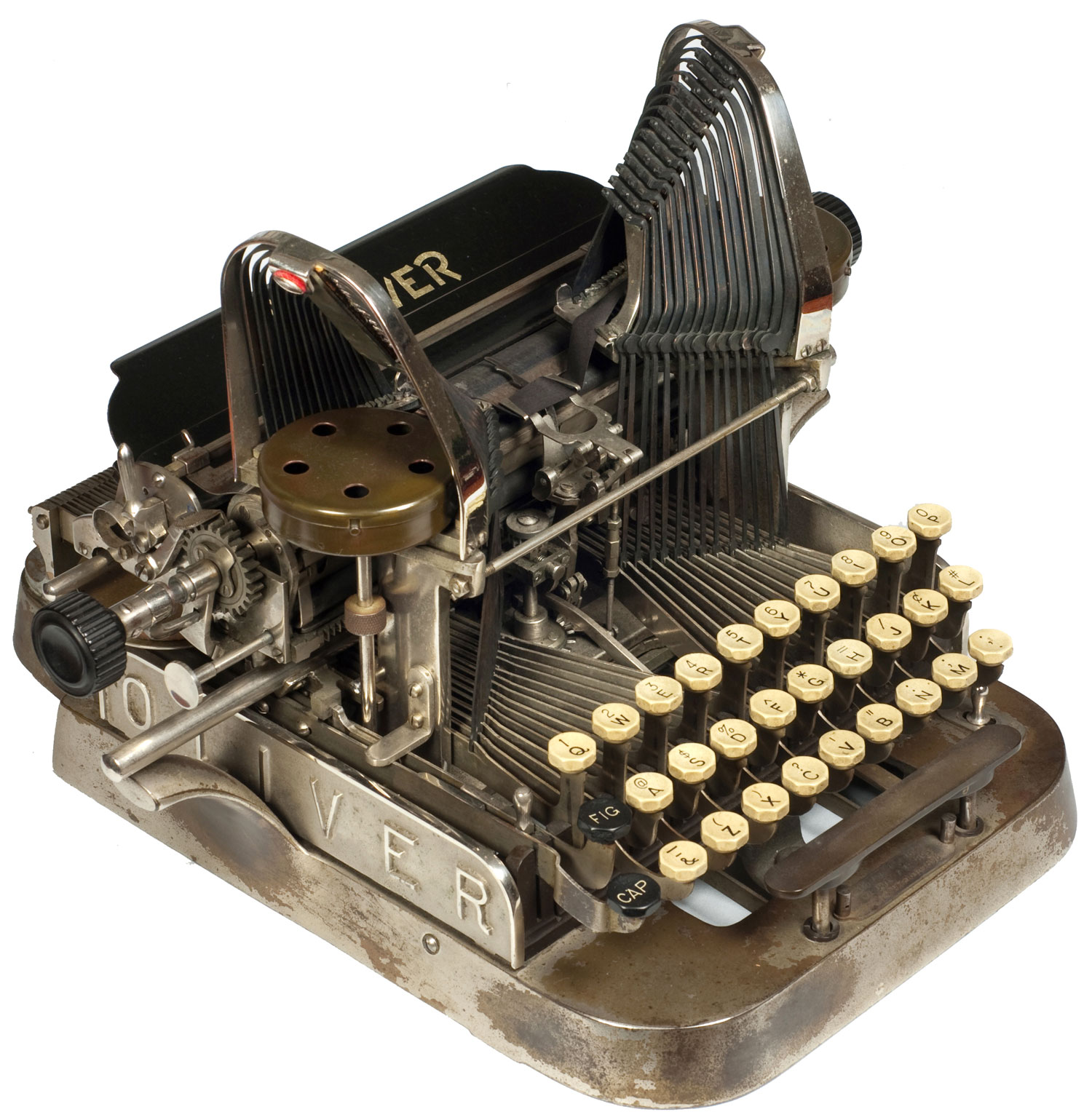
Oliver 2 typewriter, 1896

The Oliver Typewriter Company was an American typewriter manufacturer headquartered in Chicago, Illinois. The Oliver Typewriter was one of the first "visible print" typewriters, meaning text was visible to the typist as it was entered. Oliver typewriters were marketed heavily for home use, using local distributors and sales on credit. Oliver produced more than one million machines between 1895 and 1928 and licensed its designs to several international firms.

Competitive pressure and financial troubles resulted in the company's liquidation in 1928. The company's assets were purchased by investors who formed The British Oliver Typewriter Company, which manufactured and licensed the machines until its own closure in the late 1950s. The last Oliver typewriter was produced in 1959.

== History ==
=== Thomas Oliver ===
Thomas Oliver was born in Woodstock, Ontario, Canada, on August 1, 1852. Having become interested in religion, Oliver moved to Monticello, Iowa, after the death of his mother, to serve as a Methodist minister. In 1888, Oliver began to develop his first typewriter, made from strips of tin cans, as a means of producing more legible sermons. He was awarded his first typewriter patent, US Patent No. 450,107, on April 7, 1891. After four years of development, a "crude working model" composed of 500 parts had been produced. Oliver resigned his ministry and moved to Epworth, Iowa, where he found investors willing to provide $15,000 ($581,000 in 2025) of capital, and leased a building in which to manufacture his machines.

While visiting Chicago to promote the machine, Oliver encountered businessman Delavan Smith, who became interested in the typewriter and bought the stock held by the Iowa investors. Oliver was given a 65% interest in the company and retained to continue development of the typewriter, at an annual salary of $3,000 ($116,000 per year in 2025). Oliver died suddenly of heart disease on February 9, 1909, aged 56.

=== Illinois years ===
The Oliver Typewriter Company had begun operating in 1895, with its Chicago headquarters on the ninth floor of a building on the corner of Dearborn and Randolph Street. In 1896, manufacturing moved from Iowa to Woodstock, Illinois, when the City of Woodstock donated a vacant factory once used by the Wheeler and Tappan Company on the condition that the Oliver Typewriter Company remain there at least five years. Manufacturing was divided into six departments: type bar, carriage, assembly, tabulators and adjustment, inspection, and an aligning room. The company's headquarters moved to the Oliver Building, now a Chicago landmark on the National Register of Historic Places, when it was completed in 1907.

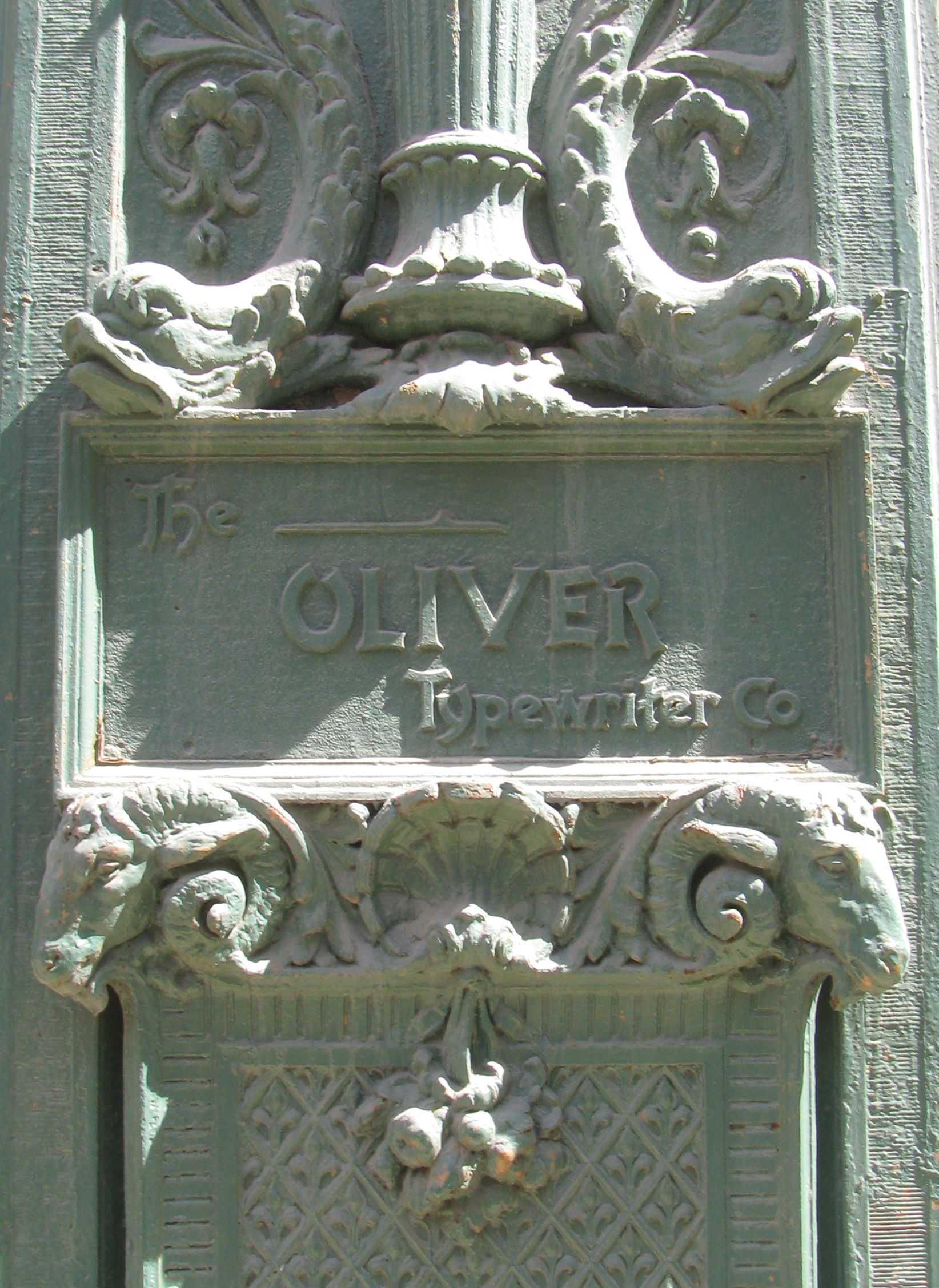
Company ornamentation on the Oliver Building

Starting in 1899, the company established sales networks by encouraging customers to become local distributors. This method of marketing relied on word of mouth and emphasized sales made directly to neighbors (door-to-door) and, after 1905, sales on credit. In response to increased competition in the late 1910s, however, the company eliminated its network of local salesman and used the resulting savings in commissions to reduce the typewriter's $100 ($1,900 in 2025) price by half. Sales increased and, at its peak, the company's labor force of 875 was producing 375 machines daily. During World War I the company produced munitions for the British army and supplied typewriters for the military. At the war's conclusion, the company subcontracted their factory to create car parts and movie projectors.

In addition to its offices in Illinois, the company had branch offices in Baltimore, Buffalo, Cleveland, Kansas City, Minneapolis, New York City, Omaha, St. Louis, San Francisco and Seattle, all of which closed when Oliver shifted to mail order sales in March 1917. A minor recession in 1921–22 caused a large number of customers to default on their payments, resulting in the repossession of their typewriters. The company opted not to borrow money and, in 1926, the board of directors voted to liquidate the company. Only one employee, Chester Nelson, was retained to oversee the company's liquidation.

=== British Oliver Typewriter Company ===
In 1928, the Oliver Typewriter Company was sold to investors who formed the British Oliver Typewriter Company in Croydon, England and established a factory there. Production of Oliver's original, three-rowed keyboard design was discontinued in 1931 when the company began to produce a rebranded model of the "Fortuna" typewriter, a four-rowed German design. In 1935, the company began to produce the Halda-Norden standard typewriter, another licensed design, as model No. 20. The company, however, had to retool its machines and return to the original Oliver design when the British government placed large orders for the three-rowed No. 15 at the outbreak of World War II.

Production of the No. 20 resumed around 1947, at which time the company began to license the Oliver name to several European manufacturing companies. The standard desktop machine was eventually discontinued in favour of portable models; the company began to sell a German design, the Siemag Standard, as the Oliver standard. In 1958, Oliver purchased the Byron Typewriter Company, previously the Barlock Typewriter Company, of Nottingham. The licensing ventures were ultimately unsuccessful, and the company's machine tools were transferred to a factory in Germany. Production of all Oliver typewriters ended in May 1959.

== Typewriters ==
=== Design ===
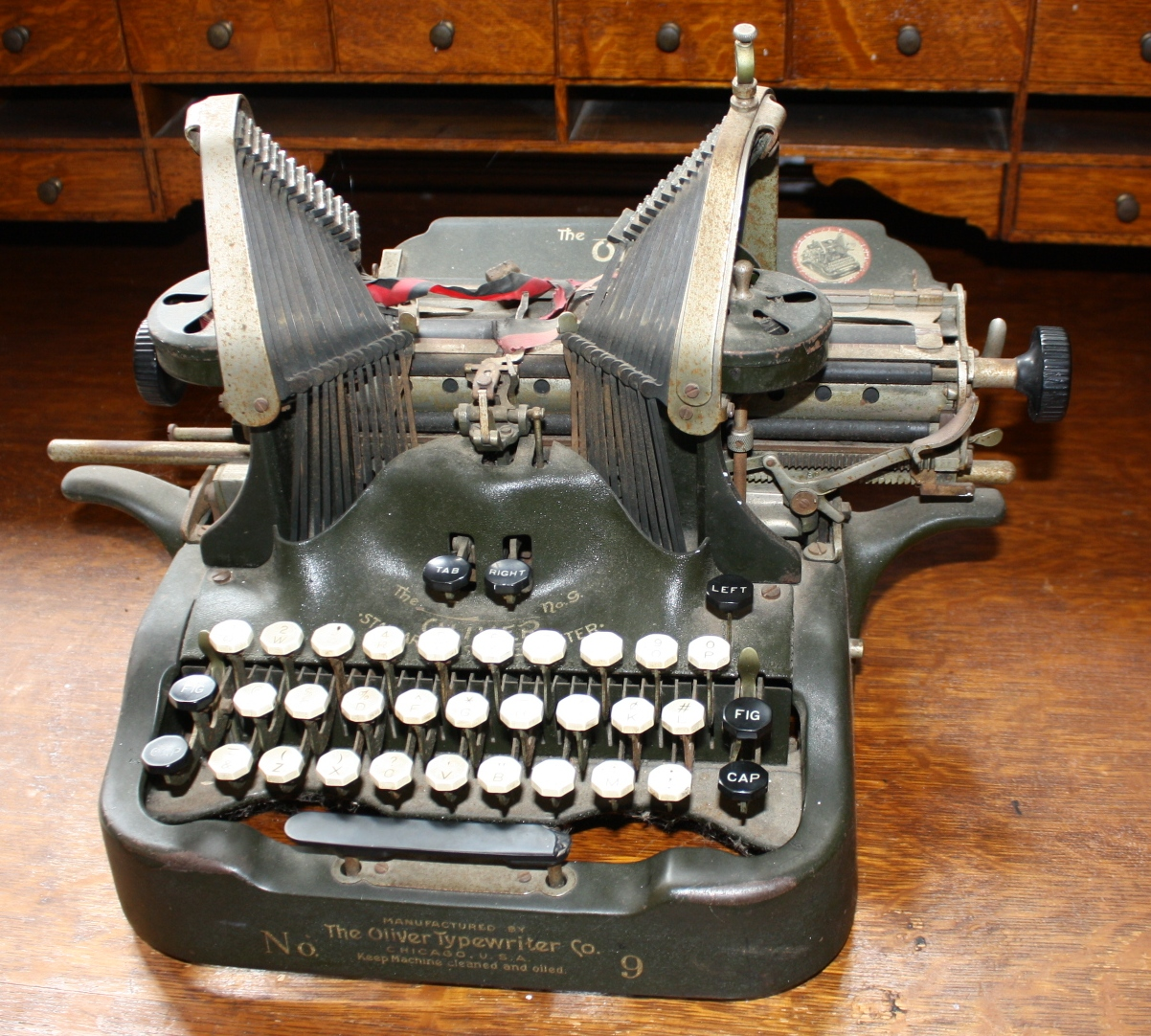
An Oliver model No.9

The general design of Oliver typewriters remained mostly unchanged throughout the company's history. The Olivers are "down strike" typewriters, meaning the typebars strike the platen (also known as the roller) from above, rather than from below ("up strike") or from the front ("front strike"). Unlike the "up strike" method, which prints text out of sight on the underside of the platen, the "down strike" is a "visible print" design, meaning the full page is visible to the typist as the text is being entered. The relatively greater striking power of the "down strike" design led Olivers to be preferred for specialty uses such as stencil cutting or "manifolding" (copying using carbon paper). The "front strike" method, a competing "visible print" design, was patented around the same time (1889–91), but an effective machine that did not interfere with the typist's line of sight was not available until 1897 when, roughly three years after the introduction of the Oliver No. 1, the Underwood No. 1 appeared on the market.

The Oliver's typebars are bent in a bow (forming an inverted "U" shape) and rest in "towers" on the sides of the typewriter. This design limited the machine to a three-row QWERTY keyboard as the typebars were stacked such that they grew progressively larger as more were added. The size and usability implications of adding additional keys and thus, more typebars, precluded the addition of a fourth keyboard row dedicated to numbers. Although a four-row prototype was designed in 1922, it was shelved due to the company's financial troubles at that time. The No. 20, No. 21 and portable models produced by the British Oliver Typewriter Company had four-row keyboards.

=== Colour ===
Oliver typewriters were finished with olive green paint or nickel-plating and white or black keyboards, depending on customer preference. Beginning with model No. 3, machines were painted green except some variants to be exported to warm or damp regions, which were chrome-plated. The colour was changed from green to black on the introduction of model No. 11. Oliver typewriters made for the British war effort were supplied with a "war finish".

=== Models ===
==== United States ====
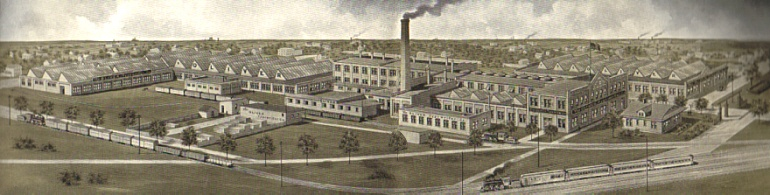
United States models were manufactured in the company's factory in Woodstock, Illinois.

The following models were produced in the United States between 1893 and 1928:

Model	Years Produced	Number Produced	Notes
No. 1	1893–1896	500	First model; completely nickel-plated; closed "O" in "Oliver" on name plates
No. 2	1896–1901	30,000	Improved paper feed; added handles; early versions have closed "O" side panels; later versions have open "O" (see logo)
No. 3	1901–1907	148,000	Taller base
No. 4	1904–1907		Taller base
No. 5	1907–1914	311,000	Oliver name plates removed from sides; backspacer added to later versions
No. 6	1907–1914		Oliver name plates removed from sides; backspacer added to later versions
No. 7	1914–1915	57,000	Left margin release moved to right of keyboard
No. 8	1914–1915		Left margin release moved to right of keyboard
No. 9	1915–1922	449,000	Right and left shift keys; two-colour ribbon
No. 10	1915–1922		Right and left shift keys; two-colour ribbon
No. 11/12	1922–1928	35,000	Last model produced in the United States; handles removed; black colour

With the exception of model No. 2, even-numbered models were produced with extra keys (32 versus 28 keys) for sale in countries with accented languages.

==== United Kingdom ====
The following models were produced by the British Oliver Typewriter Company between 1928 and 1942:

Model	Years Produced	Number Produced	Notes
No. 15	1928–1947	34,390	
No. 16	1928–1932		
Four Bank	1931–1935	> 12,663	Rebranded Fortuna IV typewriter
No. 20	1935–1950	> 5,599	Rebranded Halda-Norden No. 5 typewriter
No. 21	1949–1959	33,129	Rebranded Halda No. 6 typewriter
Portable	1930–1959	> 83,500	Various portable models

==== International ====
Oliver typewriter designs were licensed for production in several countries. Variants of model No. 3 were produced by The Linotype Company of Montreal and A. Greger & Co. of Vienna. Models produced by licensees were marketed under various names including "Courier" (Austria), "Stolzenberg" (continental Europe) and "Revilo" (Argentina). The Argentinian licensee used Revilo, Oliver backwards, to avoid royalty payments on the Oliver name, which had already been registered in Argentina. A nickel-plated model No. 3 was designed to avoid rust in warm, damp climates; by 1907, Mexico was importing them, with a market value of around US$100 in 1910 (the equivalent of about $2,100 in 2013).

== Legacy ==
The 1915 novel Los de Abajo by Mariano Azuela was about the declining value of a pillaged typewriter for Mexican revolutionaries who had to carry the heavy device on their journeys; it featured an Oliver Typewriter model No. 3.
