= Oliver Building (Chicago) =

- U.S. National Register of Historic Places
- Chicago Landmark
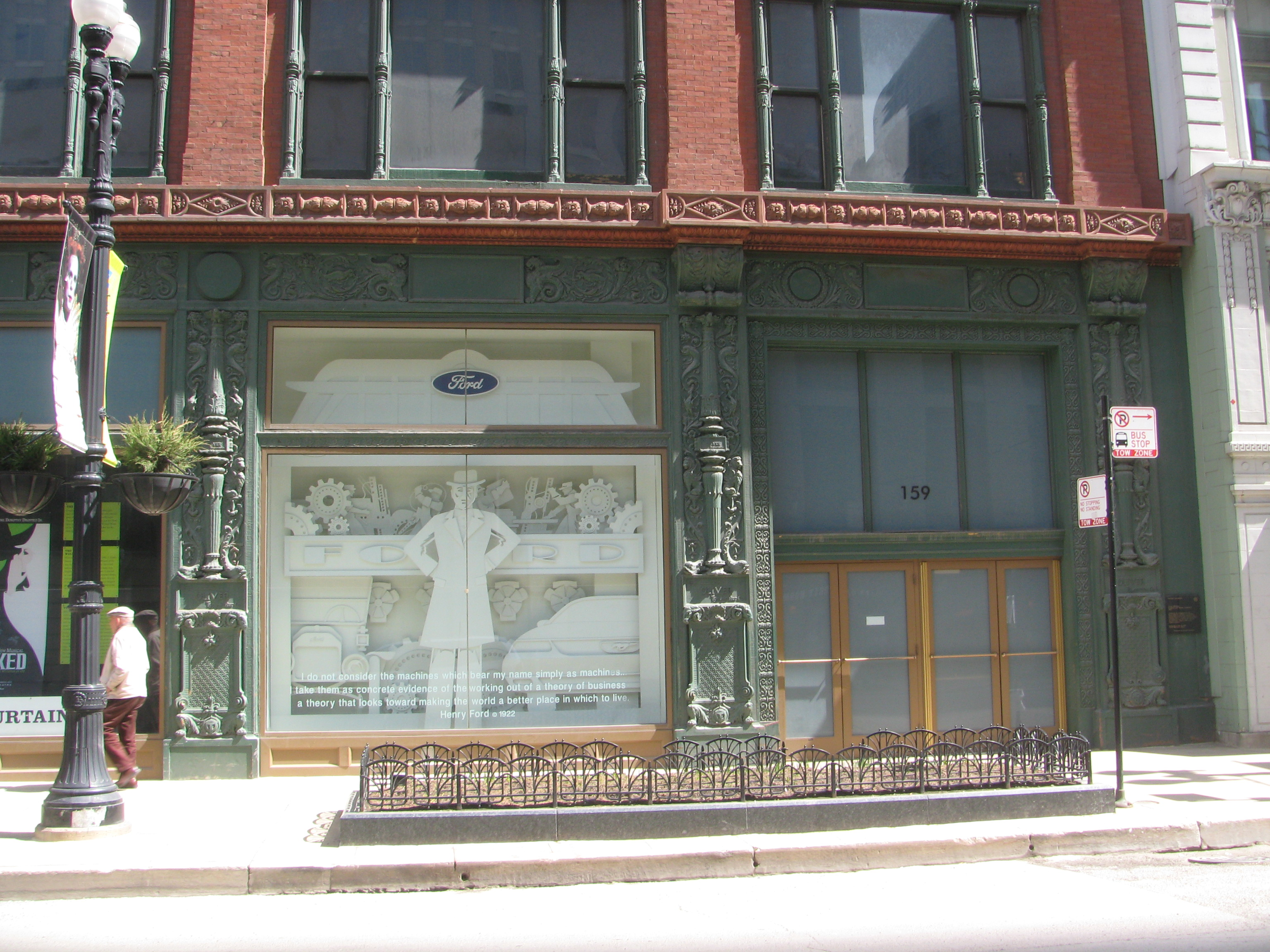
- Oliver Building Front Door with Oliver Typewriter Company ornamentation
- Location: 159 N. Dearborn, Chicago, Illinois, United States
- Coordinates: 41°53′05″N 87°37′45.5″W
- Built: 1907–1908
- NRHP reference No.: 83003563

Significant dates
- Added to NRHP: 1984
- Designated CHICL: May 9, 1984

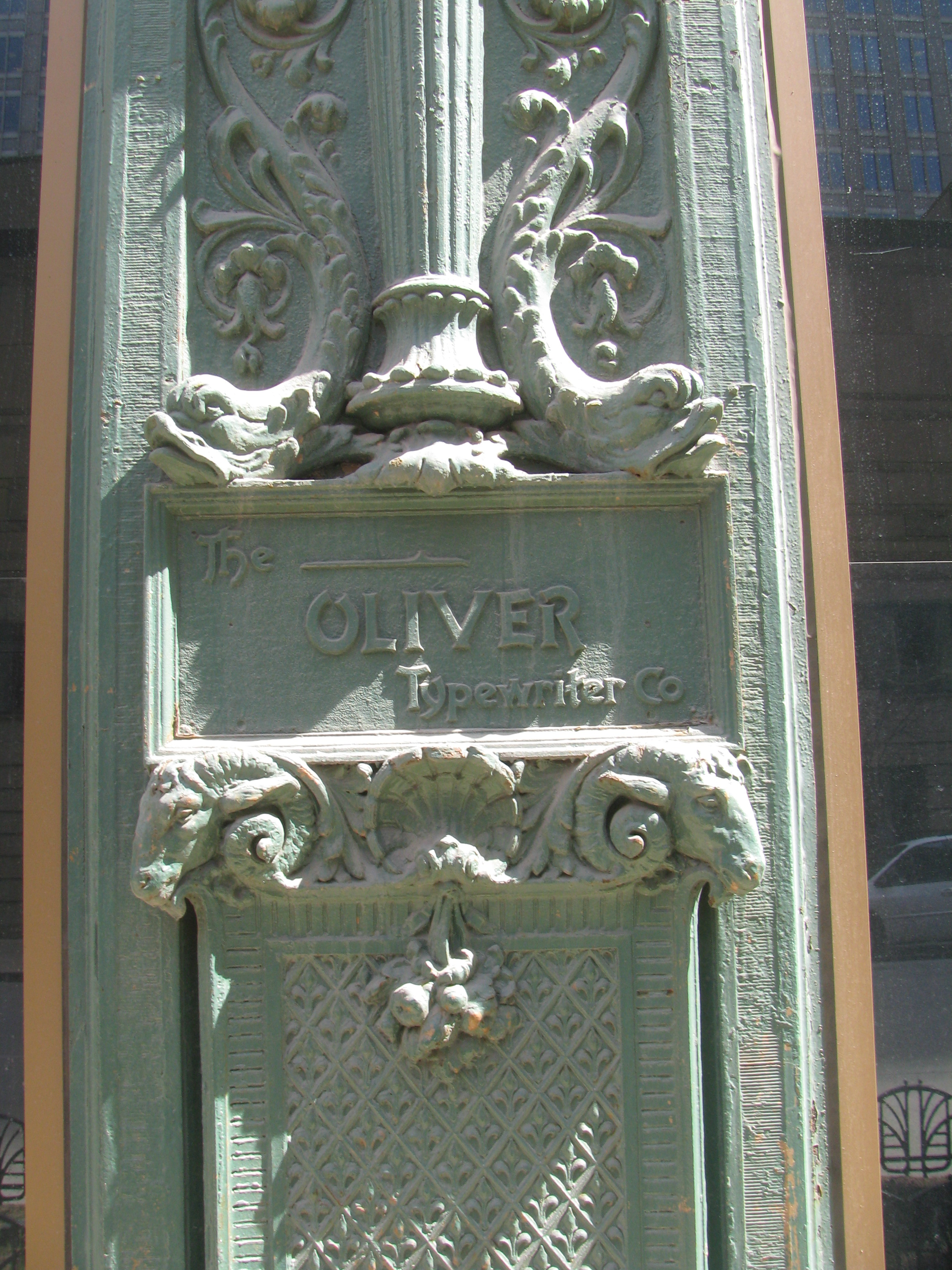
Oliver Typewriter Company ornamentation on Oliver Building (Chicago)

The Oliver Building is located at 159 N. Dearborn Street in Chicago within the Loop.

== History ==
It was built for the Oliver Typewriter Company from 1907 to 1908 by Holabird & Roche. When two floors were added in 1920, Holabird & Roche were hired for the expansion. The cast iron exterior features typewriter-related motifs. It was declared a Chicago Landmark on May 9, 1984.

The windows above the second floor are known as "Chicago windows," and are wide window panes bracketed by narrower double-hung windows. The windows also include the name of the company below the central pane.

In the 1990s, when the Oriental Theatre wanted to expand its backstage area, architect Daniel P. Coffey came up with a design plan that gutted the Oliver while preserving one-third of its original steel structure, as well as the building's Dearborn facade and a portion of its alley facade.
