= Grace Groner =

American woman who gifted $7 million to Lake Forest College

- Grace Groner in the Lake Forest College yearbook, 1930
- Born: April 4, 1909
- Died: January 13, 2010 (aged 100); Lake Forest, Illinois
- Occupation: Secretary
- Known for: Bequeathed US$7 million to Lake Forest College (equivalent to $10.3 million in 2025)
- Website: https://www.gronerfoundation.com

Grace Groner (April 4, 1909 – January 19, 2010) was an American woman recognized after her death for a posthumous gift of seven million dollars to her alma mater, Lake Forest College.

== Early life ==
Groner was born in 1909 in a small Lake County, Illinois, farming community. She had a twin sister, Gladys, who died in April 2007. Upon their being orphaned at age 12, both sisters were taken in by George Anderson, one of the prominent members of the community. He paid for both of them to attend nearby Lake Forest College, from which they graduated in 1931. Grace Groner never married.

== Adult life ==
For many years Groner lived with Ann Findlay, an elderly relative of George Anderson, in a small apartment in the building that housed the Lake Forest movie theater, which was owned by the Anderson family. She was always considered "family" by the Anderson family.

In 1935, Groner purchased three $60 shares in Abbott Laboratories, where she also worked for 43 years. Over the years, her shares split many times, and she reinvested the dividends each time. She had few needs, lived in a small cottage willed to her, bought clothes at rummage sales, but travelled extensively. She also gave money to the needy, but kept her name anonymous .

Gladys and Grace Groner at Lake Forest College, 1929

Over the years, Groner remained close to Lake Forest; she donated $180,000 to help start a scholarship fund and attended college football games. In 2008, she set up a foundation that would receive her estate upon her death. It was estimated that the foundation would earn $300,000 a year on interest from her estate.

== Gift to Lake Forest College ==
On January 19, 2010, Groner died. After her death it was revealed that her estate totaled in excess of seven million dollars and was left to a foundation she had established prior to her death. She expressed her desire that the income should be used to benefit students of Lake Forest College by funding independent study, internships, international study and service projects, as well as a possible grant to a student attending pharmacy school. Upon being told of this, college president Stephen D. Schutt is said to have exclaimed, "Oh, my God."

Her home has been updated by her foundation and is currently occupied by two senior Lake Forest College women during their senior year who have made significant contributions to the college community and who have received a foundation grant. The women live in the home as Grace's guests. It is estimated that some 1,300 students will benefit from her will. The home will be known as "Grace's Cottage."
