= Lindsay Hughes Blanton =

American minister and academic administrator (1832–1914)

The Reverend Lindsay Hughes Blanton
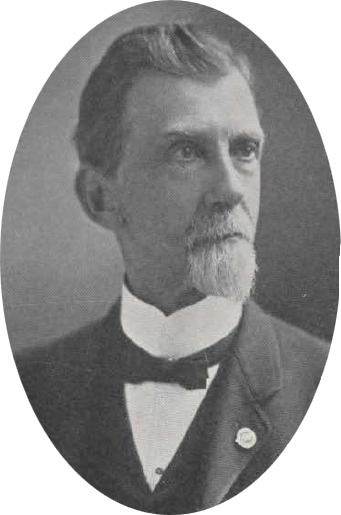
- Blanton c. 1903

3rd (Note: Modern sources list Blanton as directly succeeding Robert L. Breck and thereby being Central's second chancellor. Contemporary reporting shows that Breck's successor was Rutherford Douglass, who was elected in late March 1880 and resigned less than two months later to focus efforts on his church.) Chancellor of the Central University of Kentucky
- In office July 23, 1880 – July 16, 1901
- Preceded by: Rutherford Douglass

Personal details
- Born: January 29, 1832 Cumberland County, Virginia, U.S.
- Died: September 17, 1914 (aged 82) Danville, Kentucky, U.S.
- Resting place: Bellevue Cemetery
- Spouse(s): Elizabeth Irvine (m. 1857; died 1901) Myra Bracken (m. 1904)
- Education: Hampden–Sydney College; Union Presbyterian Seminary; Danville Theological Seminary
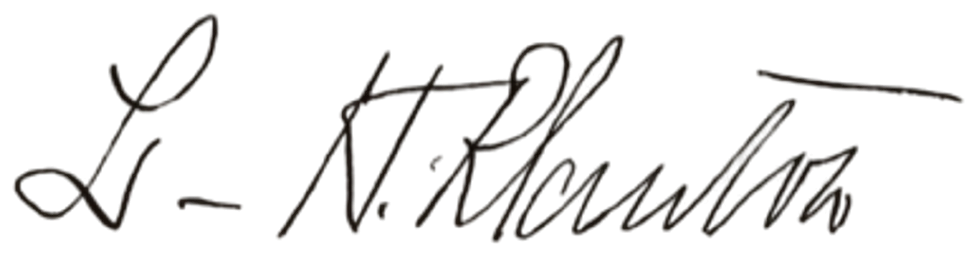
- Signature

Military service
- Allegiance: Confederate States
- Branch/service: Confederate States Army
- Years of service: 1863–1865
- Rank: Chaplain

Lindsay Hughes Blanton (January 29, 1832 – September 17, 1914) was an American Presbyterian minister and academic administrator. He was the third and final chancellor of the Central University of Kentucky in Richmond, Kentucky, from 1880 until its 1901 consolidation with Centre College. He was vice president of the combined school, then also called the "Central University of Kentucky", from 1901 to 1907.

Born in Virginia, Blanton earned a license to preach in 1857 and began as a pastor in Versailles, Kentucky. He stayed there until the outbreak of the Civil War and was appointed as a chaplain in the Confederate States Army in 1863. After the war, he moved to Paris, Kentucky, and he was the pastor at Paris Presbyterian Church for the next 18 years. In 1880, he was elected chancellor of the Central University of Kentucky in Richmond, which had been struggling with a lack of money and students for much of its six-year existence. He attempted to better the school's financial standing by securing assistance from the church, fundraising, and opening enrollment to women, though the issues still persisted. Blanton gave his approval of a planned merger with Centre College in Danville, Kentucky, in 1901, and the merger took effect that July. He retired after six years as vice president of the post-merger school and died seven years later.

== Family and early life ==
Lindsay Hughes Blanton was born on January 29, 1832, (Note: This date of birth is the consensus among sources, though Smith (1886) lists July 29, 1832, and the National Cyclopædia (1907) lists January 29, 1834.) in Cumberland County, Virginia. He was the second son born to Susan (née Walker) (d. 1856) and Joseph Blanton (d. 1849). His father was a planter from eastern Virginia whose family had lived in the state since the early 18th century. Blanton was Scotch-Irish on his mother's side. His younger brother was Joseph P. Blanton, whom he raised following the death of both of their parents. Joseph later became president of the First District Normal School (now Truman State University) and the University of Idaho.

Lindsay graduated from Hampden–Sydney College with a Bachelor of Arts degree in June 1853. He enrolled at Union Presbyterian Seminary but transferred after one year to Danville Theological Seminary and graduated from there in 1857.

== Career ==
=== Minister and chaplain, 1857–1880 ===
Blanton received his license to preach from the Louisville Presbytery in April 1857. He began a pastorate at Versailles Presbyterian Church in Versailles, Kentucky, the same year, and he was formally ordained as a Presbyterian minister by the West Lexington Presbytery on March 26, 1858. He left the Versailles church in 1861 at the outbreak of the Civil War, since he knew that the congregation largely supported the Union while he supported the Confederacy. The same year, he moved to Salem, Virginia, and began preaching there. (Note: Some sources disagree as to when his pastorate in Salem began; most sources list 1861, but Hoffer (1938) gives an exact start date of May 12, 1862, and several additional sources report that he did not begin until the war's end in 1865.) He was made chaplain of the 44th Virginia Infantry Regiment of the Confederate States Army under the command of Simon Bolivar Buckner in 1863. In early 1864, he was transferred to the 26th Virginia Infantry Battalion under George Edgar, and he served as their chaplain until the conclusion of the war. Blanton remained pastor of the Salem church until March 19, 1868; for his final three years in Virginia, he was stated clerk to the general assembly of the Synod of Virginia.

Blanton began preaching at Paris Presbyterian Church in Paris, Kentucky, in 1868, and he was formally installed as pastor in June 1869. The church enjoyed a good reputation during his time in charge; the historian William E. Ellis noted that the church was among the "strongest 'southern' churches" in Paris, and a new church building was constructed and dedicated in his first two years there. As pastor, Blanton was paid a salary of $2,300 (equivalent to $67,000 in 2025); this increased to $2,500 (equivalent to $73,000 in 2025) in January 1875. That same year, he was selected for a pastorate in Shelbyville, Kentucky, but he opted to remain in Paris until 1880. He was stated clerk to the Synod of Kentucky for his last six years in Paris and continued in this position each year until 1909.

=== Central University of Kentucky, 1880–1907 ===
Blanton left the Paris church upon his selection as chancellor of the Central University of Kentucky in Richmond, Kentucky. He had accepted the position by July 14 and took office following church approval on July 23, 1880. Succeeding Robert L. Breck and Rutherford Douglass, Blanton arrived during a period of general downturn for the school, which had only opened six years prior; the historian C. A. Evans noted that the 60-student Central was "practically closed" when Blanton took office. He was able to put the school in better standing early in his term by making fundraising an immediate priority. His efforts were met with praise: The Courier-Journal noted that the school had seen "remarkable" change and an "instant [revival]" in the first year of his administration. That year, Blanton was joined by the presidents of four other private colleges (Note: The other four were W. W. Hendrix of Bethel University, Ormond Beatty of Centre College, Richard Moberly Dudley of Georgetown College, and David W. Batson of Kentucky Wesleyan College.) in speaking out against state-run colleges; this came shortly after what is now the University of Kentucky split from Transylvania University and was able to use its state-funded status to offer significantly lower tuition costs than were available for private schools.

Money continued to be a problem for much of Blanton's term as chancellor. He allowed the Southern Presbyterian Synod to take control of appointments to the board of curators in 1884 in exchange for financial support, though the situation did not immediately improve. Blanton submitted his resignation as a result in 1886, but it was unanimously rejected by the board. At that time, the school's enrollment had grown to 239 students representing 16 states. The university began admitting women in the 1880s or 1890s in order to increase the enrollment, (Note: Two sources from the Eastern Kentucky University special collections give differing accounts of when Central became coeducational: one says that women were first admitted in the 1880s and the other says women were first admitted in the 1890s and first graduated in 1896.) though the Panic of 1893 offset some of the benefits gained as it limited the success of an ongoing fundraiser. By the turn of the century, Blanton had raised over $300,000 (equivalent to $11.6 million in 2025) for the endowment with an additional $80,000 (equivalent to $3.1 million in 2025) invested in campus buildings. Central's academic offerings also grew to include colleges of dentistry, law, medicine, and philosophy, and the college added to student life with fraternities and athletics.

Blanton was a leading proponent of a plan to consolidate Central with Centre College, in nearby Danville, due to Central's considerable ongoing enrollment and financial struggles. This had been considered by the two institutions as early as 1887, but it gained momentum with Blanton's support around the start of the twentieth century. In 1901, Blanton formally gave his support for consolidation; as a result, Central University's board also supported the plan. The Kentucky Synod approved it near-unanimously on April 23 of that year, and Central's board of curators held their last meeting that June before the merger officially took effect on July 16, 1901. At the time of its closure, Central's enrollment was 978 students, and it had graduated 300 students during Blanton's tenure as chancellor, though never more than 25 in any single class.

The consolidated school inherited Centre's location, campus, and history, but changed its name to "Central University of Kentucky". William C. Roberts, president of Centre since 1898, remained in office, and Blanton became the vice president. He remained in this position for six years before retiring effective June 11, 1907. The following day was his final commencement ceremony at Central, during which his resignation was formally announced and he was presented a loving cup as a gift from alumni of the first Central University. Upon his retirement, Blanton became the first Kentuckian to receive an annuity of $1,000 (equivalent to $35,000 in 2025) from Carnegie Foundation's Commission for Retired Educators. Central did not hire a replacement as vice president.

== Personal life, death, and legacy ==
Blanton married Elizabeth Irvine, of Danville, on October 6, 1857. The couple had six children—three sons and three daughters—and remained married until Elizabeth's death on June 4, 1901. Blanton then remarried to Myra Bracken (née Rice), of Lebanon, Kentucky, on August 17, 1904. He received two honorary degrees from Hampden–Sydney: a Doctor of Divinity in 1878 and a Doctor of Laws in 1901. He was a commissioner to the Presbyterian General Assembly on four occasions, and he was a founding trustee of the Confederate Home in Pewee Valley, Kentucky, until 1909.

Blanton died in the late afternoon of September 17, 1914, at his home in Danville. The Kentuckian-Citizen reported that he had been sick for two years and that he died from "hardening of the arteries".

The historian C. T. Thompson called the merger the "crowning act" of Blanton's life, noting that it "[united the] Presbyterian forces for education in Kentucky". Blanton was noted as being an "efficient pastor" with "abundant enthusiasm" for education by the 1907 National Cyclopædia of American Biography, and the historian E. Polk Johnson called him "one of the most widely known Presbyterian figures in the south". His obituary in The Carlisle Mercury referred to him as "one of the foremost educators in the state", and he was eulogized by Governor James B. McCreary as "a soldier, educator, minister, Christian, and friend".

Blanton's original on-campus residence in Richmond, a brick house constructed in 1886 at a cost of $6,500 (equivalent to $233,000 in 2025), was later named for him. Blanton House was the residence of the president of Eastern Kentucky University (EKU) until 2013, when it became EKU's alumni center.

== Notes ==
Academic offices
Preceded by Robert L. Breck	Chancellor of the Central University of Kentucky (Richmond, Kentucky); 1880 — 1901	Succeeded by Position abolished
Preceded by Position established (?)	Vice president of the Central University of Kentucky (Danville, Kentucky); 1901 — 1907	Succeeded by Position abolished
