= Žemaitis =

Žemaitis is the masculine form of a Lithuanian family name. The name means "Samogitian" in Lithuanian. Its feminine forms are: Žemaitienė (married woman or widow) and Žemaitytė (unmarried woman).

The surname may refer to:

- Alan Zemaitis, American football cornerback
- Antanas Žemaitis, pen name of Antanas Žmuidzinavičius, Lithuanian painter and art collector
- Jonas Žemaitis, namesake of the General Jonas Žemaitis Military Academy of Lithuania
- Joe Zemaitis
- Juozas Žemaitis
- Feliksas Baltušis-Žemaitis, Lithuanian army brigade general and Red Army major general
- Kristupas Žemaitis, Lithuanian basketball player
- Terri Zemaitis, American female volleyball player
- Tony Zemaitis, guitar maker from England
- Viktorija Žemaitytė, Lithuanian female Olympic athlete
- Zita Žemaitytė, art critic, recipient of the Lithuanian National Prize
