= Stephen D. Schutt =

American academic (born 1954)

13th President of Lake Forest College
- In office 2001 – July 2022
- Preceded by: David Spadafora
- Succeeded by: Jill Baren

Stephen D. Schutt (born 1954) was the 13th president of Lake Forest College, serving from 2001 to 2022. Before joining Lake Forest, Schutt served as Vice President & Chief of Staff at the University of Pennsylvania.

Schutt began his career as a journalist, practiced law with a large Philadelphia firm, supervised a 5,000-employee agency as Deputy Secretary for the Pennsylvania Department of Labor and Industry, and served as Chief of Staff to United States Senator Harris Wofford. At the University of Pennsylvania, Schutt was the principal author and coordinator of the University's strategic plan; supervisor of its budget, planning, affirmative action, and communications operations; co-director of its initiative to revitalize West Philadelphia; and principal advisor to the President.

On June 25, 2021, Schutt announced he would retire following the end of the 2021-22 academic term. Schutt planned to serve as president emeritus of Lake Forest College until December 2022 before fully retiring.
