= Eugene Hotchkiss III =

Eugene Hotchkiss III, circa 1975

Eugene "Gene" Hotchkiss III (April 1, 1928 – June 26, 2025) was an American educator who was Lake Forest College's longest serving president from 1970 to 1993.

== Early life and education ==
Eugene Hotchkiss III was born in Berwyn, Illinois on April 1, 1928. He had an older brother, Frank Emerson. They grew up in Highland Park, Illinois. He registered for military service in World War II on April 1, 1946, his eighteenth birthday.

He attended Dartmouth College in Hanover, New Hampshire, living in South Massachusetts Hall and graduating in 1950. At Dartmouth he was a member of the Ski Team. He was a member of the Chi Phi Fraternity, and won its Sparks Medal for scholarship in 1950. In November 1949, Hotchkiss was named as an NROTC Unit Officer in Dartmouth's Alumni Magazine.

He received his PhD from Cornell University in Ithaca, New York in 1960.

== Career ==
Hotchkiss served as a Navy intelligence officer during the Korean War, from 1950 to 1953. In 1953, he was hired as assistant to the dean of the College at his alma mater, Dartmouth. From 1955 to 1958 he served as assistant dean of Cornell University, after which he return to Dartmouth as associate dean from 1958 to 1960. Hotchkiss was the first full-time dean of students at Harvey Mudd College in Claremont, California from February 1960 to 1962, and its first dean of the College from 1962 to 1968. From 1968 until 1970 Hotchkiss served as provost at Chatham College in Pittsburgh, Pennsylvania.

In Spring 1970 Hotchkiss was hired as the eleventh president of Lake Forest College. During his tenure at Lake Forest College, he oversaw its entry into the Associated Colleges of the Midwest (est. 1958) and its establishment of a Women's Board in 1971. In 1973, he led the establishment of the College's Robert E. Wood Institute for Local and Regional Study. In 1977, he leveraged a trustee's connection to Theodor Geisel to bring "Dr. Seuss" to campus as commencement speaker. In 1978, he proposed a tuition subsidy for students attending private colleges and universities in Illinois to the Illinois Board of Higher Education, as a member of the Officials of the Federation of Illinois Independent Colleges and Universities. In 1986, $1 million of a $5 million gift to the College was put towards establishing an endowed professorship, the Hotchkiss Presidential Chair, to recognize excellence in scholarship, its first recipient being Rosemary Cowler. In 1992, Hotchkiss was one of 50 individuals appointed by the Illinois Supreme Court to lead a commission studying court reform to stem judicial corruption: the Special Commission on the Administration of Justice. He retired from Lake Forest College as president emeritus in Spring 1993, having completed a $40 million capital campaign for the College. When he took on the role in 1970, the College had been in dire financial straights with a endowment of only $5 million and a deficit of $1.5 million.

In 1994, Hotchkiss was a serving as a senior fellow of the Foundation for Independent Higher Education and on the board of directors of Lake Forest Bank & Trust Co. He was also a senior fellow of the Association of Governing Boards of Colleges and Universities. In 1995, he was president of the Independent Schools Coordinating Council of Lake Forest, working to achieve voluntary technology sharing. In 2000, Hotchkiss emerged from retirement to serve one year as interim president of Eckerd College in St. Petersburg, Florida.

== Personal life ==
In 1962, Eugene Hotchkiss married Smith College graduate and fellow educator Suzanne E. "Sue" Troxell. They had one daughter. Hotchkiss was an avid bike rider. He and his wife were buried at Lake Forest Cemetery.

== Legacy ==
In 1980, Hotchkiss helped establish the community-based youth organization Committee Representing Our Young Adults (CROYA). In 1993, Lake Forest College renamed its North Gym as Hotchkiss Hall, the same year awarding Hotchkiss an honorary Doctor of Laws degree. In 2014, Hotchkiss established the Sue and Gene Hotchkiss Celebration of Faculty Scholarship at Lake Forest College as a memorial to his wife, who had passed the year prior. In 2015, the Dean of Students office suite within the Campus Center of Harvey Mudd College was named in honor of Hotchkiss following a gift from alumni Patrick and Penny Barrett. In 2020, Hotchkiss was honored as a Local Legend by the History Center of Lake Forest–Lake Bluff where he served on the board of directors.
