= Walter Hill Jr. =

Walter B. Hill Jr. (22 May 1949 – 29 July 2008) was a scholar, historian and archivist. He worked with the Smithsonian and the National Archives for 30 years and wrote and edited for many academic journals. He was an advocate of diversity in archives and specialized in African American history. He is best-known as the consulting historian for the film, Glory, which was praised for its historical accuracy. He was a speaker at several conferences and events throughout his career. He frequently appeared on C-SPAN to discuss historical topics and controversies, especially topics pertaining to the American Civil War, African American history, and slavery.

== Early life and education ==
Hill was born in St. Louis, Missouri on May 22, 1949.

He attended the College of Wooster for his 1971 bachelor's degree in history. He then attended Northern Illinois University for his master's degree in American history and graduated in 1973. He taught at St. Louis University for a few years after obtaining his masters, then returned to begin his doctoral work in 1977. As a doctoral student, he worked as a teaching assistant and later an instructor for the Afro-American Studies Program. He also began work at the National Archives and Records Administration as a research student in the Office of the Archivist and Office of Federal Records. In 1983 Hill was awarded a doctoral fellowship at the Museum of American History, Smithsonian Institution. In 1988, Hill earned his Ph.D. from the University of Maryland, under the guidance of historian Ira Berlin.

== Professional career ==
Hill began work at the National Archives and Records Administration while working toward his doctoral degree but stepped down in 1983 for his fellowship from the Smithsonian. In 1984, after he had finished his fellowship, he returned to NARA as an archivist in the Office of the National Archives, remaining there until 1990.

Also in 1984, Hill became an adjunct professor at Howard University, where he started teaching African American History, continuing until his death.

In 1990, he became the director of the Modern Archives Institute and subject specialist in Afro-American history. He stayed until 1995 when he moved to their new facility in College Park, Maryland, where he assumed the role of senior archivist and specialist for Afro-American history and federal records.

=== Affiliations ===
He appeared on several television shows and documentaries as a historian. Some of his appearances include on Good Morning America, Washington Journal and Fox TV. He has also had roles behind the scenes in films, including consultancy for the 1989 film Glory, which followed the 54th Massachusetts Colored Infantry in the Civil War. The film was praised by critics and historians for its realism and historical accuracy, and for bringing public attention to African American Civil War soldiers.

He served as editor or on the editorial board of many publications including the African American History Bulletin and the Executive Council of the Association for the Study of Afro-American History. He wrote and researched many articles, guides, essays and papers on African American History. His work has been published in journals including the Newsletter of the American Historical Association and the Journal of Minority Issues.

In addition to his writings and publications, Hill spoke at many conferences, symposiums and panels, and made many major contributions to organizations dedicated to African American history.

Hill also served as the Chief Historian for the African-American Civil War Memorial Foundation, and on the Maryland Commission on African American History and Culture. He served as consultant to the Organization of American Historians and chaired their Historical Documentation and Research Committee.

In 2006, Hill was presented with a Certificate of Appreciation by Archivist of the United States Allen Weinstein. Since 2009, one year after his death, NARA colleagues at the annual Association for the Study of African American Life and History (ASALH) luncheons have reserved and dedicated a table in his honor.
