= Herbert Moore (rugby union) =

Rugby union player from Northern Ireland

- Born: 8 June 1890 Downpatrick, County Down, Ireland
- Died: circa 1976

Rugby union career
- Position: Forward
International career
Years	Team	Apps	(Points)
1910–12	Ireland	8	(0)

Herbert Moore (born 8 June 1890) was an Irish international rugby union player.

Born in Downpatrick, Moore attended Dungannon Royal School and Queen's University Belfast.

Moore, a forward, played for his university's first XV and was capped eight times for Ireland, debuting against Scotland at Belfast in 1910. He made his last appearance in 1912, against the touring Springboks at Lansdowne Road.

After being commissioned in 1914, Moore was posted to the front with the 2nd Battalion of the Royal Munster Fusiliers. He was injured during fighting in 1915, suffering a bullet wound to his left arm, as well as a fractured femur.

== See also ==
- List of Ireland national rugby union players
