= Daniel S. Gregory =

American educator, clergyman and academic administrator

Daniel Seelye Gregory (August 21, 1832—April 14, 1915) was an educator, clergyman, and president of Lake Forest University from June 1878-Spring 1886.

Daniel S. Gregory, circa 1865

== Biography ==
Daniel S. Gregory was born in Carmel, New York on August 21, 1832, to English parents Elizabeth Seelye and Horace Gregory.

From November 1860 – 1866, Gregory was married to Jennie G. Brown, with whom he had three children. In December 1867, he remarried to Harriet Byram, with whom he had two children.

In 1850, Gregory graduated from the State Normal School, Albany, in New York. From 1850 to 1853 he taught in public schools. He received his Bachelor of Arts from Princeton College (New Jersey) in 1857, and graduated from the Princeton Theological Seminary in 1860. He received a Doctor of Divinity degree from Princeton in 1873, and a Doctor of Laws degree from University of Wooster (Ohio) in 1895.

Gregory worked as an instructor in rhetoric at Princeton from 1858 to 1860. In 1861, he was ordained to the Presbyterian ministry. From 1860 to 1863 he served as pastor in Galena, Illinois. From 1863 to 1866 he served as pastor in Troy, New York. From 1866 to 1869, he served as pastor in New Haven, Connecticut. From 1869 to 1871 he served as pastor in South Salem, New York. In 1871 he returned to teaching at the University of Wooster, serving as a professor of metaphysics and logic until 1874, and of English literature until 1878.

In 1878, Gregory was elected president of Lake Forest University, where he remained until 1886. While president, he also served as professor of Christian philosophy, sometimes also teaching at Ferry Hall, the affiliated girls preparatory school. In 1880, he oversaw the founding of one of the college's first student organizations, the Zeta Epsilon Literary Society. His second wife, Harriet, founded a Ladies Aid Society to fund-raise for the college. In his last months as president, he attempted to launch a college publication, the Lake Forest, of which one eight-page edition was published in April, 1886. The next year, the long-running student newspaper The Stentor was established.

From 1886 to 1889, Gregory served as pastor in Morgan, Minnesota. From 1890 to 1894 he worked as managing editor of the Standard Dictionary, upon request of Isaac K. Funk. He went on to be co-editor of the Homiletic Review with Funk from 1895 to 1904. In 1904, he was appointed general secretary of the American Bible League and managing editor of The Bible Student and Teacher.

Gregory died on April 14, 1915, in East Orange, New Jersey.

== Books ==
- Christian Ethics: Or, the True Moral Manhood and Life of Duty, 1875.
- Practical Logic, 1881.
- The Crime of Christendom, 1900.
