= William L. Dunn =

American chemist and academic administrator (1914–1977)

William L. Dunn, 1957

William Lewis Dunn Jr. (October 18, 1914—June 1, 1977) was a chemistry professor and academic administrator who twice served as Lake Forest College's Acting President, from 1960 July–August and 1969 Fall to 1970 Spring.

== Early life and education ==
Dunn was born on October 18, 1914, in Lake Village, Arkansas, to parents Violet Walker and William L. Dunn, and had two sisters, Marjorie and Barbara. In 1936, Dunn received his bachelor's degree majoring in chemistry from the University of Illinois, where he was elected to Phi Beta Kappa. He received his PhD in chemistry from the University of Wisconsin in 1941.

Dunn married Wilson College alumna and fellow educator Eleanor Tisdel in June 1940. They had two daughters, Carol and Janet.

== Career ==
From 1941 to 1949, William L. Dunn taught chemistry at the University of Wisconsin, Cornell College, and Colorado State College of Education.

In August 1949, Dunn was hired as dean of the college and professor of chemistry at Lake Forest College in Lake Forest, Illinois, where he would work for 25 years. In 1953, vice-president was added to his title. By 1962, his role changed to Provost and Dean of the Faculty, and his teaching role ceased. Dunn was also director of the college's night courses, the summer school, and the Patterson scholars program. In 1952, Dunn served on the planning board of the Midwest conference of arts and sciences deans. In 1961, he represented the college on a panel at Presbyterian conference, "The Role and Mission of the Church-Related College in Higher Education." He served as the college's Acting President twice, from 1960 July–August and 1969 Fall-1970 Spring. In 1969, he chaired a discussion on innovations in college grading systems at the national conference of academic deans. The same year, Dunn was one of 79 college and university presidents to sign a statement to President Nixon encouraging hastened withdrawal from the Vietnam War. After retiring from the college in 1974, Dunn managed the North Shore Travel Agency.

Dunn passed away at age 62 on June 1, 1977, in Libertyville, Illinois. In 1978, Lake Forest College established the William L. Dunn Award for Outstanding Teaching and Scholarly Promise in his memory.
