= Richard J. Ablin =

Scientist--Prostate Cancer Screening

- Born: May 15, 1940
- Died: October 6, 2023 (aged 83)
- Education: Lake Forest College; University at Buffalo
- Known for: prostate-specific antigen
- Scientific career
- Institutions: University of Arizona; Hektoen Institute for Medical Research; Cook County Hospital

Richard J. Ablin (May 15, 1940 – October 6, 2023) was an American scientist, most notable for research on prostate cancer. According to the Wall Street Journal:

Richard Ablin, a professor of pathology at University of Arizona College of Medicine, discovered the prostate-specific antigen (PSA) in 1970, and for nearly as long, he has argued that it should not be used for routine screening.

== Early years ==
Ablin received a bachelor's degree from Lake Forest College in 1962 and a doctorate in microbiology from the University at Buffalo in 1967, where he received the distinguished alumni award in 2010.

== Prostate cancer screening debate ==
Professor Ablin, who condemned the use of PSA for routine prostate cancer screening, was the subject of an interview published in New Scientist in February 2014. He said he hoped to expose how the urology community and drug industry misused the PSA test, putting money over the best interests of patients, adding: "I also want to show how the US Food and Drug Administration failed in its duty to the public: its advisers warned that routine PSA screening would cause a public health disaster, but it was approved under pressure from advocacy groups and drug companies."

== Career ==
Ablin was an immunologist at Hektoen Institute for Medical Research and Cook County Hospital in Chicago, Illinois. While a member of the Biology and Genetics Program of Arizona Cancer Center, he published his 4th book, Metastasis of Prostate Cancer in 2007.

Ablin died on October 6, 2023.
