= Ralph J. Mills Jr. =

American poet

Ralph J. Mills Jr. (December 16, 1931 – August 18, 2007) was an American poet, scholar and professor.

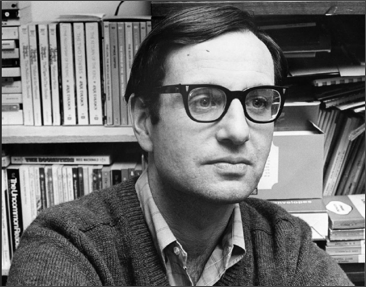
Ralph J. Mills Jr. in his study.(photo by Helen Harvey Mills)

== Life ==
Ralph Joseph Mills Jr. was born in Chicago, Illinois, on December 16, 1931. His father was Ralph J. Mills, president of the Mills Novelty Company in Chicago (inventors and makers of vending, gaming and slot machines, one of the largest in the country) and his mother was Eileen McGuire, whose family owned Beloit Dairy in Chicago. He and his sister, Anne (later Mrs. Canter), grew up in Chicago and Lake Forest, Illinois.

His first job was with his family's Mills Novelty Company in Chicago, in the summer 1950, working the lowest position at the factory, hauling compressors and returned machinery. He graduated from Lake Forest College, and Northwestern University, with a master's degree and PhD. He attended Oxford University, and taught at the University of Chicago, from 1959 to 1965. He taught at the University of Illinois at Chicago from 1965 until his retirement in 1997.

In 1959, he married the former Helen Harvey, a descendant of Fred Harvey, the owner of the Harvey House chain of restaurants, hotels, and other hospitality industry businesses alongside railroads in the western and southwestern United States. They had two daughters, Natalie (Bontumasi) and Brett, and a son, Julian, as well as two grandchildren, Lucian and Celeste, at the time of his death.

Mills died in Chicago on August 18, 2007.

His papers are held at the University of Chicago Library.

== Education ==
Mills graduated from Lake Forest Academy in 1950, Lake Forest College in 1954, and Northwestern University in 1956 with an MA in English. He also attended Oxford University from August 1956 - May 1957. Mills later received a PhD from Northwestern in 1965 (under Richard Ellmann, noted scholar of James Joyce and W.B. Yeats) and an Honorary Degree in Letters from Lake Forest College, 2004.

== Professor and critic ==
Mills was a poet, scholar and professor. A teacher and critic known for the precision of his observations and the generosity of his praise, Mills first taught at University of Chicago (1959–65), and was Associate Chairman of the Committee on Social Thought. He then taught modern literature, poetry and creative writing in the English Department at University of Illinois at Chicago from 1965 to 1997, where he was the first director of graduate studies in English. At UIC, he taught a range of classes, but in later years focused on poetry. He had the ability to break down complex poems and "didn't demand his students be carbon copies of who he was", said Michael Anania, a poet and colleague of Mills' at UIC.

His literary ambitions dated to his college years at Lake Forest College; he studied English and published his early work in Tusitala, the college's literary magazine. After graduation, Mills earned an MA and PhD in English from Northwestern University and studied at Oxford. He led a distinguished academic career, teaching first at the University of Chicago and later becoming the first director of graduate studies in English at the University of Illinois–Chicago, where he taught modern literature and creative writing for more than 30 years.

Mills committed himself to poetry scholarship early in his career; he edited the letters of the great American poet Theodore Roethke and the notebooks of David Ignatow. Mills' scholarly essays and reviews have appeared in the most distinguished literary and academic journals, but he has also written with great verve and clarity for a popular audience in the Chicago Sun-Times. He edited the famous anthology Contemporary American Poetry.

Between 1963 and 1975, he published numerous critical articles, monographs, eight books of criticism and two volumes of essays on contemporary American poets, as well as edited Theodore Roethke's letters and selected prose, and David Ignatow's Notebooks. His essays and criticism concentrated on 20th Century poets such as Roethke, Edith Sitwell and Wallace Stevens. His critical work was used in numerous classrooms and workshops over the years and reprinted in textbooks and a compilation of his well-received criticism, Essays on Poetry, was published in 2003.

He was also poetry reviewer for the Chicago Daily News, Chicago Sun Times, Poetry, and American Poetry Review in the late 1960s.

== Poet ==
A highly respected and published critic, Mills was a distinguished poet in his own right. His focus turned more seriously to his own poetry when he was in his early thirties, prompted by the death of his father. Much of his poetry was in the objectivist style, "dependent on images, tersely presented," said fellow poet Michael Anania. His command of the written word was always paramount, but his work got tighter over the years. "His poems were not always easy to parse, some of the thoughts he was trying to get across were complicated thoughts," said novelist Ward Just, a classmate of Mr. Mills' at Lake Forest Academy. He worked in a third-floor den of his home, writing in longhand and revising frequently before moving to a typewriter.

He published thirteen volumes of poetry and won awards as the Carl Sandburg Award in 1983 and the William Carlos Williams Prize in 2000. His final selected of poems, Grasses Standing, won the William Carlos Williams Prize from the Poetry Society of America.

Ralph J. Mills Jr.'s published volumes of poetry:

- Door to the Sun (1974)
- A Man to his Shadow (1975)
- Night Road/Poems (1978)
- Living with Distance (1979, awarded Society of Midland Authors Prize for Poetry)
- With No Answer (1980)
- March Light (1983, awarded Carl Sandburg Award)
- For a Day (1985)
- Each Branch: Poems 1976-1985 (1986)
- a while (1989)
- Nine Poems (1993)
- A Window In Air (1993)
- In Wind's Edge (1997)
- Grasses Standing: Selected Poems (2000, awarded the William Carlos Williams Prize from the Poetry Society of America)

== Awards ==
- 1979, 1984 and 1987 Illinois Art Council Award for Poetry
- 1980 Society of Midland Authors Prize for Poetry
- 1984 Carl Sandburg Literary Award
- 1999 Selected as part of the arts program Poetry in Motion for the Chicago Transit Authority
- 2000 William Carlos Williams Award from the Poetry Society of America

== Works ==
- Already, Beloit Poetry Journal, Fall 1975]
- Grasses standing: selected poems. Asphodel Press. 2000. ISBN 978-1-55921-245-8.
- A window in air: poems. Asphodel Press, Moyer Bell. 1993. ISBN 978-1-55921-073-7.
- In wind's edge: poems. Asphodel Press/Moyer Bell. 1997. ISBN 978-1-55921-187-1.
- Each branch: poems, 1976-1985. Spoon River Poetry Press. 1986. ISBN 978-0-933180-89-5.
- Living with distance. BOA Editions, Ltd. 1979. ISBN 978-0-918526-18-2.

== Literary criticism ==
- Essays on poetry. Dalkey Archive Press. 2003. ISBN 978-1-56478-294-6.
- Theodore Roethke. University of Minnesota Press. 1963. ISBN 978-0-8166-0304-6.
- Peter Stitt; Frank Graziano, eds. (1990). "James Wright". James Wright: the heart of the light. University of Michigan Press. p. 59. ISBN 978-0-472-06403-8.
- Bruce Weigl; T. R. Hummer, eds. (1984). "The Poetry of James Dickey". The Imagination as glory: the poetry of James Dickey. University of Illinois Press. p. 30. ISBN 978-0-252-01101-6.
