= Herbert Moore (footballer) =

Australian rules footballer

Personal information
- Full name: Herbert Frederick Moore
- Born: 11 March 1888; Melbourne, Victoria
- Died: 17 June 1972 (aged 84); Port Melbourne, Victoria

Playing career^{1}
Years	Club	Games (Goals)
1909	South Melbourne	1 (0)
- ^{1} Playing statistics correct to the end of 1909.

Herbert Frederick Moore (11 March 1888 – 17 June 1972) was an Australian rules footballer who played with South Melbourne in the Victorian Football League (VFL).

Moore's son Roy played for South Melbourne in the 1930s.
