= Central University of Kentucky =

Presbyterian college in Richmond, Kentucky, US

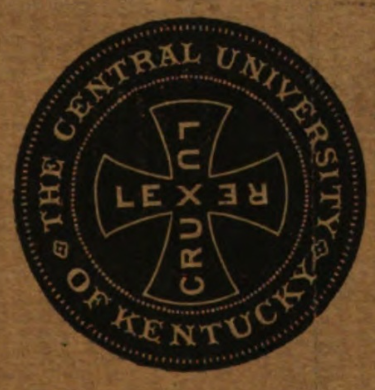
- Motto: Lex Rex, Crux Lux
- Motto in English: The Law is the King, The Cross is the Light
- Type: Private
- Active: March 3, 1873–July 16, 1901
- Religious affiliation: Southern Synod of the Presbyterian Church
- Location: Richmond, Kentucky, United States
- Successor: Centre College
- Colors: Cream and Crimson

The Central University of Kentucky was an American private college that was associated with the Southern Synod of the Presbyterian Church. It opened in Richmond, Kentucky in 1874. The university consolidated with Centre College in Danville, Kentucky, in 1901.

== History ==
The Southern Synod of the Presbyterian Church of Kentucky established The Central University of Kentucky in Richmond, Kentucky. Central University was created an alternative and rival to Centre College which was established by the Presbyterian Church of Kentucky before the Civil War and was operated by the Northern Synod after the determination of a federal court case in 1871. The Kentucky Legislature chartered Central University on March 3, 1873.

The university opened with 224 students on September 22, 1874. Robert Levi Breck was Central University's first chancellor, serving from 1874 to 1880. Rutherford Douglass was hired in March 1880 to succeed him, though Douglass resigned less than two months later to focus his efforts on his church. Lindsay Hughes Blanton was elected chancellor in July 1880 and held the position until the university merged. Initially, the university was managed by a Board of Curators who were appointed by the Alumni Association of Centre College, established by the Southern Synod in 1872. In 1884, the Southern Synod started to provide financial support and took on control of the board.

This support was needed because the university's enrollment dropped yearly, with its largest class of only 25 graduates. The university had commitments for an endowment of $220,000, contributed by people from Richmond and Madison County, Kentucky and Centre College alumni who supported the Southern Synod. However, many of these pledges were unfulfilled because of the Panic of 1873 and the Panic of 1893. In the 1880s, the university admitted female students, hoping to increase enrollment. It also reduced its faculty and cut their salaries.

Beset with financial difficulties and small enrollment, the university consolidated with Centre College in Danville, Kentucky on July 16, 1901. The merged institution was called Central University of Kentucky and was located in Danville on the Centre College's campus.

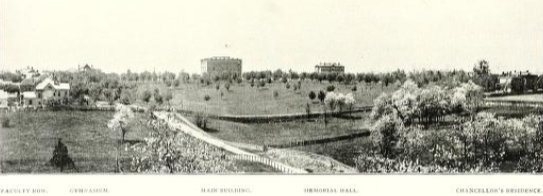
Campus overview in 1898, including Faculty Row, the Gymnasium, University Building, Memorial Hall, and the Chancellor's Residence

== Campus ==
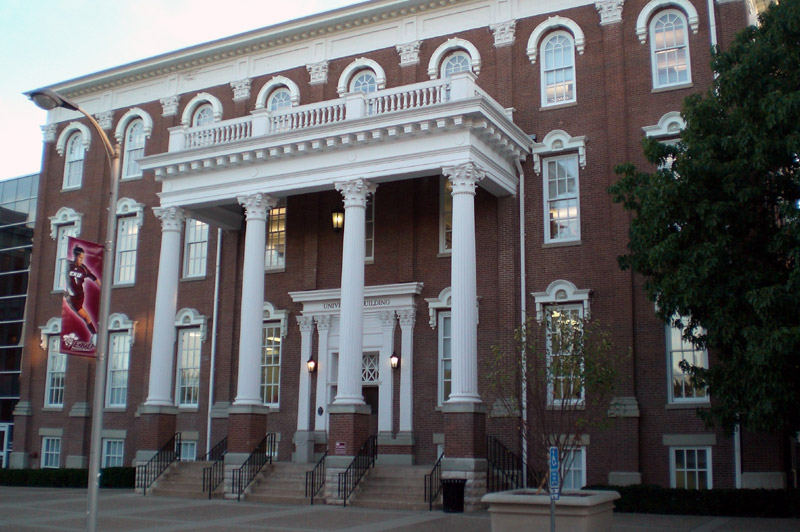
University Building, now part of Eastern Kentucky University

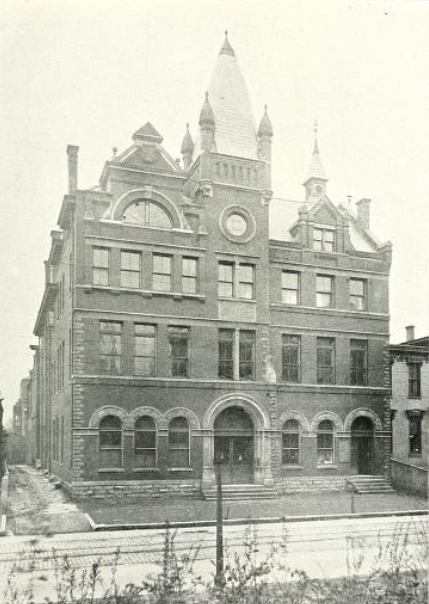
Central University's Hospital College of Medicine in Louisville, Kentucky, 1898

The primary campus of Central University consisted of 40 acres in Richmond, Kentucky. Its first and main building, the three-story University Building, was built in 1874 from bricks made on site. It was constructed in the Italianate style and featured a portico with four two-story Corinthian columns. By 1901, this campus included eight buildings, including Miller Gymnasium.

Walters Collegiate Institute, a boys' preparatory school, used the former university campus for five years. In 1906, the Kentucky Normal School Commission selected the former Central University campus as the location for the new Eastern Kentucky State Normal School, now called Eastern Kentucky University.

== Academics ==
Central University initially included a College of Law; the College of Philosophy, Letters, and Science; and the Richmond Preparatory School in Richmond, as well as the Hospital College of Medicine in Louisville. In 1886, the university sold a franchise to dental educators who created the Louisville College of Dentistry in Louisville in 1887. The university associated with additional preparatory schools, including, the S. P. Lees Collegiate Institute in Jackson in 1890, the Middlesboro Collegiate Institute in Middlesboro in 1892, and Hardin Collegiate Institute in Elizabethtown in 1896.

Degrees offered included Bachelor of Arts, Bachelor of Science, Bachelor of Letters, Master of Arts, Master of Science, Master of Letters, and Doctor of Medicine. Undergraduate majors for the 1890–91 academic year included the Bible and Christian Evidences, Chemistry, Commercial Science, English Language and Literature, Geology, Greek, History and Political Science, Latin, Mathematics and Astronomy, Modern Languages (French and German), Philosophy, Physics, and Physiology. Course offerings also included botany, bookkeeping, civil engineering, geography, psychology, and zoology. In 1890, the university had 176 students in the College of Philosophy, Letters, and Science; 153 students in the Hospital College of Medicine, and 85 students in the Louisville College of Dentistry.

== Student life ==
Central University published the Cream and Crimson yearbook, The Central News newspaper, and The Atlantis literary magazine. The Richmond campus had chapters of several fraternities, including Delta Kappa Epsilon (1884), Phi Delta Theta (1884), Sigma Alpha Epsilon (1882), Sigma Nu (1883), and Theta Nu Epsilon (1898). The university's Cotillion Club and the fraternities sponsored dances. It had two literary societies, the Epiphyllidian and the Philalethean, that sponsored oratory and debating contests and had a library. There was also a YMCA and a Central College Battalion.

The College of Medicine had a chapter of Phi Chi, established in 1898. Its College of Dentistry had a chapter of Psi Omega, founded in 1897.

== Athletics ==
Central University's athletic colors were cream and crimson. During the 1890s, its students played football against Centre College, Georgetown College, Sewanee: The University of the South, Transylvania University, the University of Kentucky, Vanderbilt University, and Washington University in St. Louis. The university's other sports were baseball, bicycling, and tennis.
