= Edward J. Smejkal =

American politician and lawyer (1876-1933)

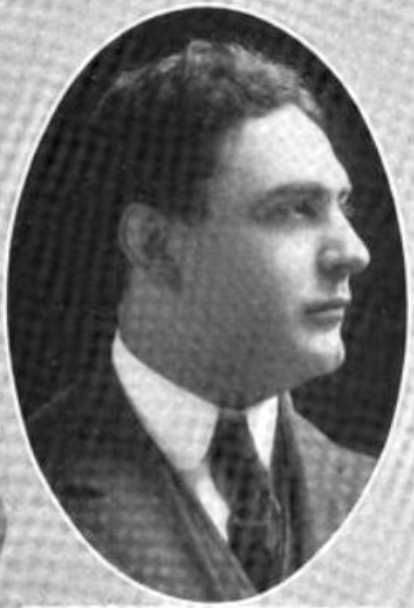

Member of the Illinois House of Representatives
- In office 1902–1926

Personal details
- Born: January 1, 1876 Chicago, Illinois
- Died: January 9, 1933 (aged 57) Berwyn, Illinois
- Party: Republican
- Education: Lake Forest College
- Occupation: Lawyer, politician

Edward J. Smejkal (January 1, 1876 – January 9, 1933) was an American lawyer and politician.

== Biography ==
Smejkal was born in Chicago, Illinois. He went to the Chicago public schools and graduated from Lake Forest College. Smejkal was admitted to the Illinois bar and practiced law in Chicago. He served in the Illinois House of Representatives from 1903 to 1925 and was a Republican. Smejkal died in a hospital in Berwyn, Illinois. He had been in ill health and had suffered from diabetes for a few years. He killed himself using poison and gas at his home.
