= Richard D. Harlan =

Clergyman, educator, and president of Lake Forest University (1901–1906)

President of Lake Forest University
- In office 1901–1906

Personal details
- Born: November 14, 1859 Evansville, Indiana, US
- Died: January 24, 1931 (aged 71)

Richard Davenport Harlan (November 14, 1859 – January 24, 1931) was a clergyman, educator, and president of Lake Forest University from 1901 to 1906.

== Biography ==
Richard D. Harlan was born on November 14, 1859, in Evansville, Indiana, to Malvina Shanklin and U.S. Supreme Court Justice John Marshall Harlan.

He was the second eldest of six siblings: Edith, James, John, Laura, and Ruth. He married Margaret M. Prouty of New York on June 5, 1889. Reporting notes his stature at six feet, four inches tall.

Richard D. Harlan (at right) with his wife and parents, circa 1906

Harlan received his bachelor's degree from Princeton University in 1881, graduating as valedictorian of his class and member of Phi Beta Kappa. In 1884, he received his master's degree also from Princeton. He graduated from Princeton Theological Seminary in 1885, and in 1904 was awarded a Doctor of Divinity degree from Princeton and a Doctor of Laws degree from Union Theological Seminary. In 1886 he was ordained in the Presbyterian ministry. From 1886 to 1890 he served as pastor of the First Presbyterian Church of New York City, eventually resigning due to feeling his views were too progressive for the Church elders. 1890 he pursued further theological study at the University of Berlin in Germany. He was then pastor of the Third Presbyterian Church in Rochester, New York until 1901.

In 1901 he was elected president of Lake Forest University in Lake Forest, Illinois, where he served until 1906. In December 1901, he was present as representative of Lake Forest at the organization of the Presbyterian College Union, initially consisting of fourteen institutions. In 1903, when scarlet fever was rampant, he put into place preventative measures, quarantining the campus from the town. In January 1906, it was reported in the Chicago Tribune that the Board of Trustees were unsatisfied with Harlan's performance; the enrollment had increased, but so had the deficit. However, in February, it was reported that the Trustees had declined to accept his resignation. By February, tensions with donor and former chair of the board, Trustee Delavan Smith, resulted in Smith's threatening to resign, and subsequent distress in the campus community. In Fall 1906, Harlan took a stand against student hazing, threatening the expulsion of students who refused to sign a faculty-written pledge not to participate in hazing. In November, his resignation was accepted by the Board, and he made a public farewell to the students in a chapel address on Monday, November 19, 1906. New student dormitory Harlan Hall was named in his honor in 1907.

From 1907 to 1910, Harlan led the financial development of George Washington University in Washington, D.C., where his father taught law, on invitation by its trustees. After his retirement, he and his life lived in Montreal, Canada for a period in the 1920s before returning to New York. Harlan died from mastoiditis on January 24, 1931, within days of his wife's death of apoplexy.
