= Elizabeth Teter Lunn =

American biologist

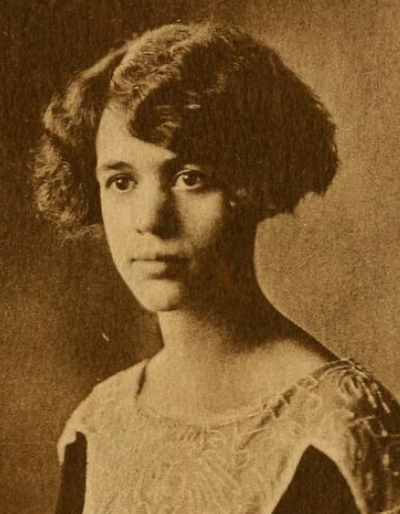
- Elizabeth Teter, later Lunn, from the 1925 yearbook of Wellesley College
- Born: June 14, 1904; Chicago, Illinois
- Died: February 1, 1998 (aged 93); Avon, New York
- Occupations: Biologist, college professor

Elizabeth Lodor Teter Lunn (June 14, 1904 – February 1, 1998) was an American biologist and college professor. She was head of the biology department at Lake Forest College from 1954 to 1964. The Elizabeth Teter Lunn Herbarium at Lake Forest is named in her memory.

== Early life and education ==
Elizabeth Lodor Teter was born in Chicago, the daughter of Lucius Teter and Clara Hahn Lodor Teter. Her father was a bank president. She graduated from Wellesley College in 1925. She pursued further studies at Northwestern University, where she earned a master's degree in 1932 and a PhD in 1939. Her dissertation was titled "The ecology of the forest floor, with particular reference to microarthropods".

== Career ==
Lunn taught biology at Lake Forest College from 1930 to 1935, and from 1946 to 1970; she was head of the biology department from 1954 to 1964. She helped to organize and advised the campus chapter of Beta Beta Beta, and gathered many specimens and photographs for the school's herbarium, from the Illinois Beach State Park and elsewhere in the state. She wrote Plants of Illinois Dunesland (1982)

From 1935 to 1946 she did not teach at Lake Forest College. She worked in the oil industry as a laboratory chemist, and as a clerk for the United States Army Corps of Engineers. She was president of the Illinois Dunesland Preservation Society in 1968. She served on the board of directors of the Lake County Tuberculosis Association. She was a trustee of the Illinois chapter of the Nature Conservancy.

== Personal life ==
Elizabeth Teter married Richard Sanborn Lunn. Richard Lunn died in 1972. Elizabeth Teter Lunn died in 1998, in Avon, New York, aged 93 years. Her papers, including plant notebooks, in the Lake Forest College Archives and Special Collections. The Elizabeth Teter Lunn Herbarium at Lake Forest is named in her memory.
