= Delavan Smith =

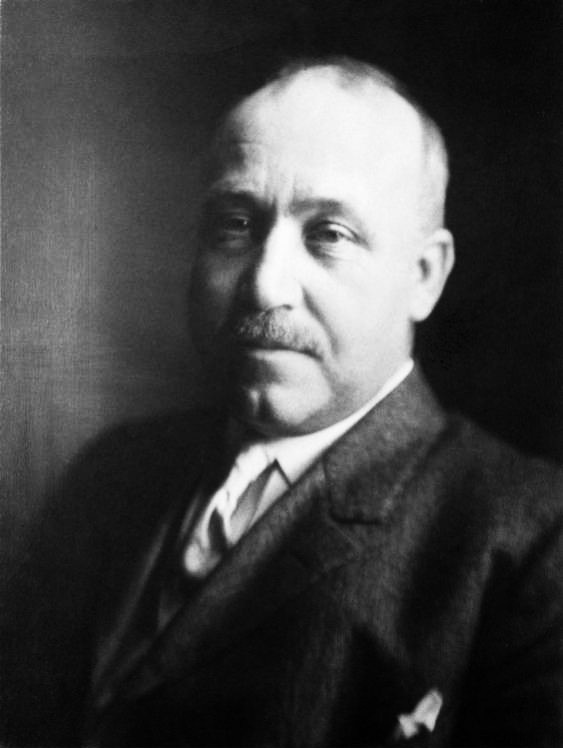
Delavan Smith, circa 1920

Delavan Smith (December 28, 1861 – August 25, 1922) was a newspaper publisher, businessman, and philanthropist based in the Midwest.

== Biography ==
Delavan Smith (frequently misspelled 'Delevan' in the historical record) was born in Cinicinnati, Ohio on December 28, 1861, as the only son to parents William Henry Smith and Emeline Reynolds. He died at age 60, in Lake Forest, Illinois, on August 25, 1922. He was an owner and publisher of Indianapolis News from 1899 until 1922, and also a businessman involved with timber, land speculations, and manufacturing. Before his involvement with the Indianapolis News, he was vice-president for the Oliver Typewriter Company and the Cox Multi-Mailer Corporation. In 1893 he was elected Secretary of the Associated Press. He was also known as a philanthropist, particularly to Lake Forest University where he served as a trustee (1897-1906). He also served as a trustee of the Alice Home Hospital in Lake Forest, Illinois, from 1898, along with the town physician Dr. Alfred C. Haven and Mrs. Mary Farwell. He had attended Lake Forest Academy and Lake Forest University, and received an engineering degree from Massachusetts Institute of Technology (MIT). He briefly worked as an engineer before working in newspaper publishing. His papers are held by the Indiana Historical Society.

== Contributions to Lake Forest University ==
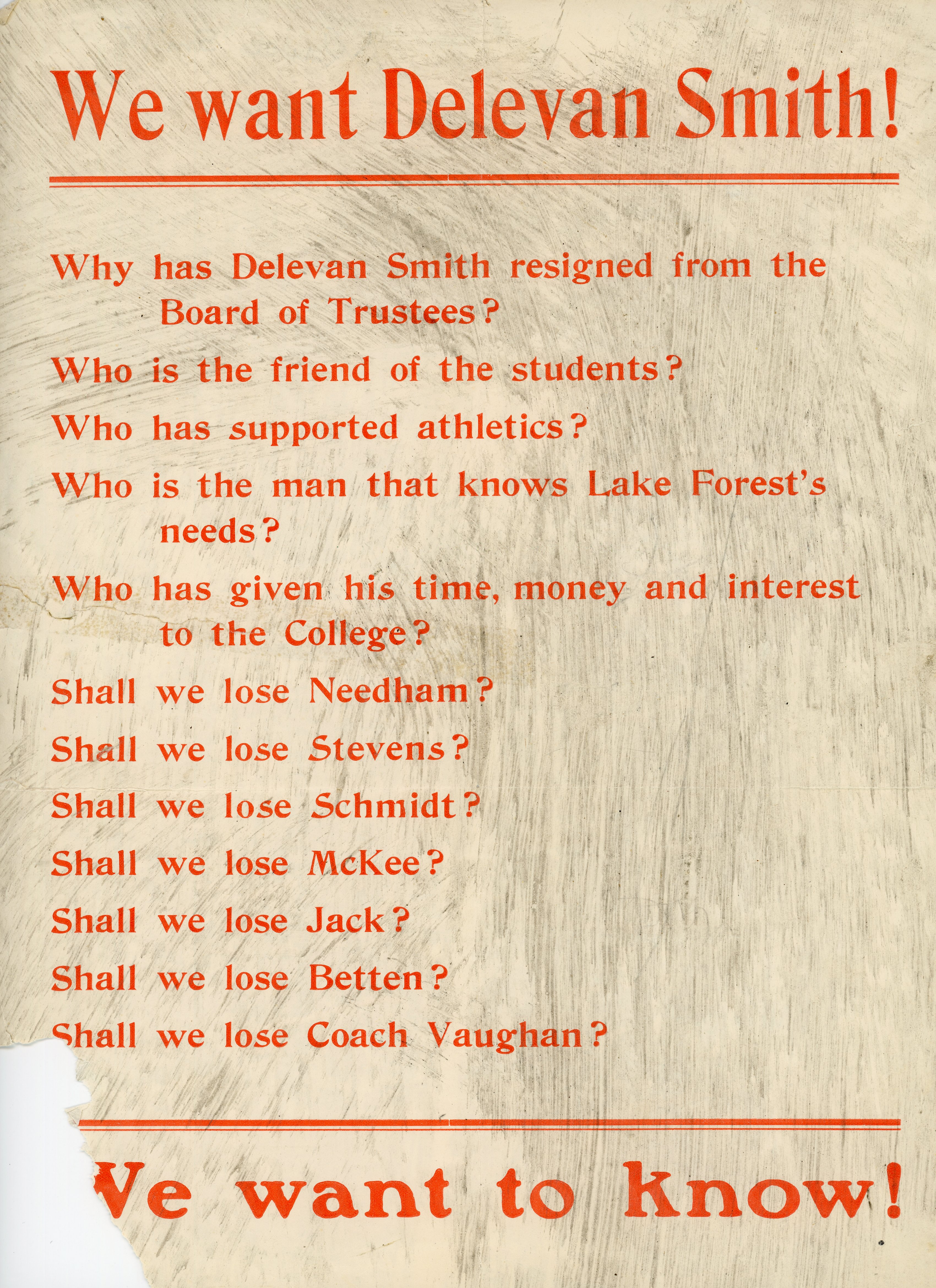
Student poster defending Smith, 28 February 1906

Delavan Smith was a member of the Board of Trustees of Lake Forest University from 1897 until 1906, and was its 12th President (1904-1905) as well as its Secretary (1898-1900). In 1898 he donated $5,000 to the University (nearly $200,000 adjusted for inflation), and another $4,500 in 1900. In 1902 he arranged for the College's gas connection with Waukegan Gas Co., contributing to the efficacy of laboratory burners. In 1904, he donated a new basketball court to Ferry Hall, the University's women's preparatory school. In 1905, he committed a $15,000 match (over half a million in 2026) to fund new dormitories on campus. He also supported the Athletics department and football team, and made significant contributions to the Library's collections. In 1906, he came into conflict with then-College President Dr. Richard D. Harlan, publicly calling for his resignation in January 1906. This outspokenness received backlash from some trustees, resulting in Smith's resignation as President of the Board. Alumni and students attempted to persuade Smith to remain, and three contemporaneous faculty resignations have been interpreted as in solidarity with Smith. In 1918 he served as Chairman of a committee to unite and administrate Alice Home Hospital (property of Lake Forest College) and the Lake Forest hospital. He was an incorporator of the Hospital of Association of Lake Forest in December 1918.

== Litigation ==
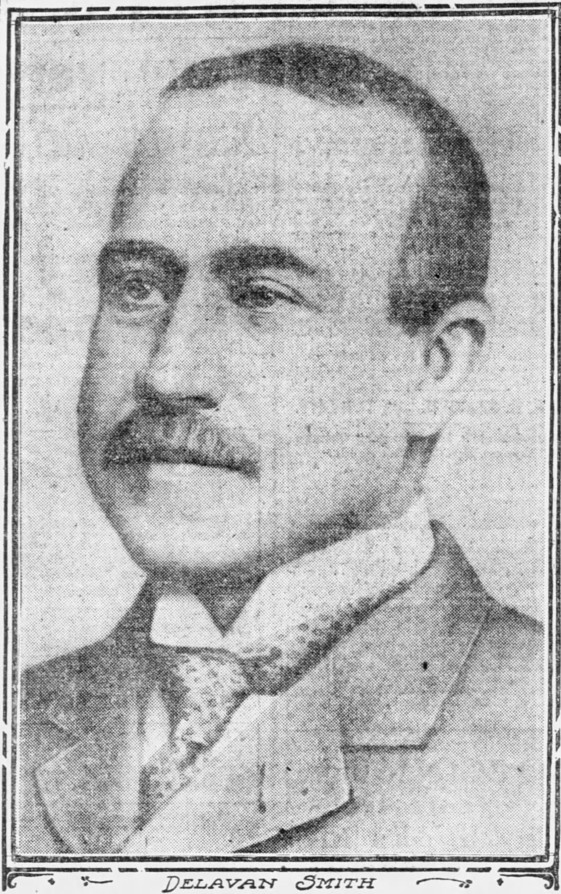
Delavan Smith portrait in the Chicago Tribune, 7 December 1908

Delavan Smith was involved in multiple legal disputes as a news publisher. In 1905, attorney and head of the Indiana railroad lobby John B. Cockrum made threats towards Smith in response to critical coverage of the lobby published in the Indianapolis News, including an unflattering cartoon of Cockrum. Most notably, in 1908, Delavan Smith was one of two newspaper editors (the other being William Laffan of the New York Sun) accused of lies by President of the United States Theodore Roosevelt Jr. regarding coverage of a purchase of property on the Panama Canal. Their dispute was recorded in public letters, with Roosevelt calling Smith's claims "abominable slander and falsehood," and Smith calling Roosevelt's accusations "a string of abusive and defamatory epithets." Smith was counted amongst Roosevelt's Ananias Club. Smith was charged with libel by a federal grand jury in this case in February 1909, but by October the suit had failed, with a federal judge determining that "a newspaper has a certain duty to perform." Litigation followed Smith even posthumously, as 16 disinherited cousins sued to break his will, unsuccessfully claiming insanity.
