= Jill Baren =

Jill M. Baren is an American physician and academic administrator who served as the 14th president of Lake Forest College from 2022 to 2024. She was the first woman to hold the position. Prior to her presidency, she held leadership roles in academic medicine and higher education administration.

== Early life and education ==
Baren earned a Bachelor of Arts degree from Brown University. She later received her medical degree (M.D.) and pursued a career in emergency medicine and academic leadership.

== Medical and academic career ==
Before entering college administration, Baren built a career in academic medicine. She held faculty and leadership positions at institutions including the University of Pennsylvania and Brandeis University. Her work focused on medical education, emergency medicine, and academic program development.

She later transitioned into higher education administration, serving in senior leadership roles at Brandeis University, including positions related to academic affairs and institutional planning.

== Presidency of Lake Forest College ==
In 2022, Baren was appointed the 14th president of Lake Forest College. Her appointment was reported by regional media and noted as historic, as she became the first woman to lead the institution.

During her tenure, she emphasized student success, institutional development, and community engagement. In 2024, she departed from the presidency after approximately two years in office. Her departure was covered by local news outlets.
