= Joe Zemaitis =

American triathlete

Personal information
- Nickname: Super Joe

Sport
- Country: United States
- Coached by: Andrew Hahne

Joe Zemaitis is a former professional triathlete from the United States. In 1998, he became the youngest person to complete the Ironman Triathlon in under 10 hours. In 2005, he won the USA Triathlon Pro/Elite Rookie of the Year.

== Early years ==
Zemaitis graduated from Lake Forest College in 2002.
