= David Spadafora =

United States historian

David Spadafora is a historian of European thought, specializing in the 18th century Enlightenment. He was the 8th President of the Newberry Library in Chicago, Illinois, and prior to that a professor at Lake Forest College. He served as president of Lake Forest College from 1993 to 2001.

== Biography ==
Spadafora is an alumnus of Williams College (B.A., 1972), and Yale University (Ph.D., 1981). He was born in Hamilton, Ohio in 1951, the son of Sam C. and Dorothy H. Spadafora. He grew up in Hamilton, attending high school at Cincinnati Country Day School in Indian Hill, Ohio. Before finishing his Ph.D., Spadafora taught history at Bard College at Simon's Rock (then known as Simon's Rock Early College) in 1977-78 and at the University of Connecticut's West Hartford campus from 1978 to 1980. He was a research analyst for the Connecticut General Assembly in 1980–81.

Thereafter, Spadafora returned to Yale, as a residential college dean and lecturer in the history department. He was acting dean of Morse College (1982) and dean of Calhoun College (1982–85), and then became associate dean of the Graduate School of Arts and Sciences (1985–90). His book, The Idea of Progress in Eighteenth-Century Britain, was published by Yale University Press in 1990, and was included in the Outstanding Academic Books List by Choice, a publication of the Association of college and Research Libraries.

Spadafora has served as a professor of history at Lake Forest College since 1990. He served as the dean of faculty from 1990 to 1993. Spadafora then served as the 12th president of the college from 1993 to 2001. In the fall of 2001, Spadafora received a one-year teaching and research fellowship at the Newberry Library from the Associated Colleges of the Midwest (ACM). During that time, Spadafora directed the ACM Newberry humanities seminar, which involved instructing visiting students from ACM colleges. Spadafora assumed the presidency of the Newberry Library in October 2005.

Spadafora's scholarly interests concern the history of Western thought. He is currently studying the tension between secularism and the Christian religion and the Christian church, with a special focus on eighteenth-century Britain.
