= Walter A. Hill =

American agricultural engineer

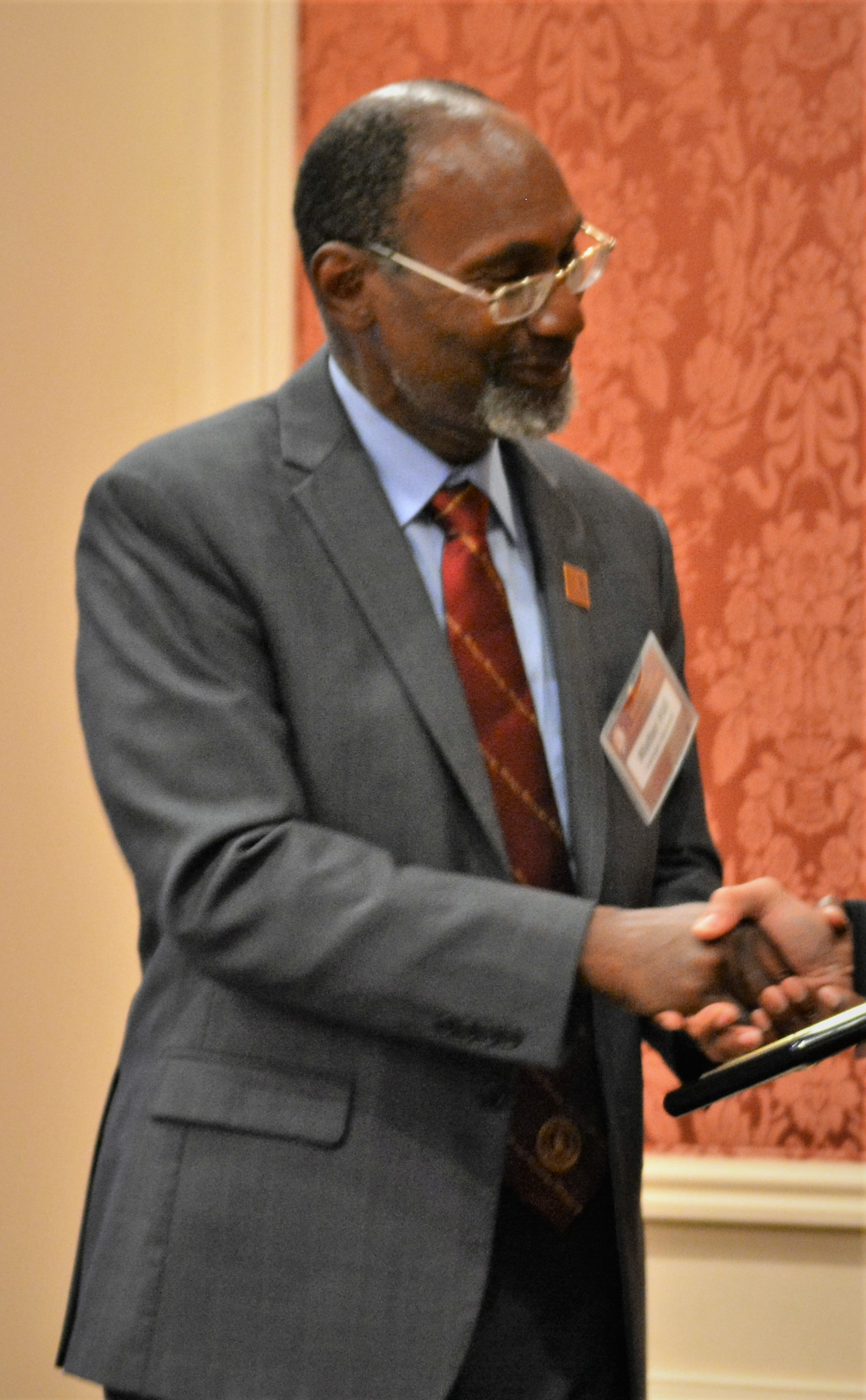
- Hill in 2015
- Born: 9 August 1946; New Brunswick
- Education: Lake Forest College, University of Chicago, University of Arizona, University of Illinois Urbana-Champaign
- Occupation: Agricultural engineer; university teacher
- Academic career
- Institutions: Tuskegee University (1987–)
- Thesis: Leaching and Denitrification Losses of Nitrogen-15 Labeled Fertilizer Nitrogen in Two Illinois Soils

Walter A. Hill (born August 9, 1946) is an American scientist who is Professor and Dean of the College of Agriculture, Environment and Nutrition Sciences at Tuskegee University. In 2016 he was inducted into the U.S. Department of Agriculture's National Institute of Food and Agriculture Hall of Fame.

== Early life and education ==
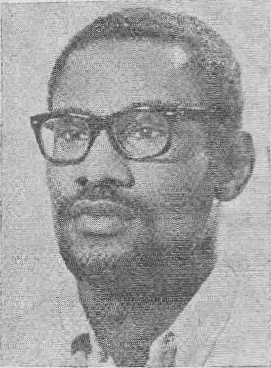
Walter Hill, 1968

Hill was born in New Brunswick, New Jersey. He is a descendant of the Hill Plantation in South Carolina. His mother was a teacher and his father was an Episcopal minister. At the age of two, Hill's family moved to Oakland, California, He attended Scipio Jones High School, where his academic achievements resulted in him securing a scholarship to study at university. He first studied chemistry at Lake Forest College in Illinois. During his time at Lake Forest College, Hill played varsity basketball, was elected to Iron Key (the men’s honor society), and became a leader of the Black student community, chairing the steering committee of "Soul Week ‘68, An Exploration of Afro-American Culture," which spurred the creation in April 1968 of Black Students for Black Action (BSBA). Hill spent his final year at the Free University of Berlin. During his time in Germany, the Assassination of Martin Luther King Jr. took place. He eventually returned to the United States and moved to the University of Chicago for his graduate studies, where he completed a Master of Arts in Teaching in chemistry. After completing his teacher training, Hill worked as a chemistry teacher in the Chicago Public School system. Hill became increasingly interested in a career in agriculture, and moved to the University of Arizona to work toward a master's degree in soil chemistry. He joined the University of Illinois at Urbana–Champaign for his doctoral research, where he specialised in agronomy and environmental chemistry.

== Research and career ==
Hill moved to Tuskegee University, where he has spent the majority of his academic career. His early research considered sweet potatoes; in 1990, Hill, among other authors, published a paper proposing sweet potatoes as a viable candidate for the controlled ecological life-support system program. The program was developed as people became concerned about food supplies during long-term crewed space missions. Amongst eight crops considered for growth in space, sweet potatoes were easiest to produce and store. Hill investigated whether sweet potatoes could be grown using hydroponics. At Tuskegee, Hill was named the Director of the George Washington Carver Agricultural Experiment Station. He was made Dean of the College of Agriculture, Environment and Nutrition Sciences in 2012.

=== Awards and honors ===
In 1986, Hill was the recipient of Lake Forest College's Alumni Distinguished Service Award for his achievements in agricultural science, and in 1990, he was elected to the College's Board of Trustees. Hill was awarded an honorary doctorate from Lake Forest College in 2001. In 2005, the Alabama Farmers Federation recognized him with their Service to Agriculture Award. In 2016, he was elected to the United States Department of Agriculture National Institute of Food and Agriculture Hall of Fame. In 2020, The Community of Scholars selected Hill as one of the most inspirational Black scientists in America.
