= Herbert M. Moore =

President of Lake Forest College (1920–1942)

Herbert McComb Moore (August 17, 1876—March 7, 1942) was a professor of biblical literature and president of Lake Forest College from Fall 1920 until February, 1942.

Herbert M. Moore, 1922

Herbert M. Moore's signature, 1929

== Early life and education ==
Herbert M. Moore was born August 17, 1876, in Macomb, Illinois to parents to parents Jennie Lindsay and Josiah Moore. Moore received his Bachelor of Arts degree from Lake Forest College in 1896, majoring in political science. As an undergraduate he played on the football and baseball teams and performed in the glee club. In 1899, he graduated from the McCormick Theological Seminary with a Bachelor of Divinity degree. From 1900 to 1901 he did graduate study at the United Presbyterian College of Edinborough, Scotland under theologian James Orr and traveled in Scotland, England, Germany, and Switzerland. He was ordained in the Presbyterian Church in 1901. He received an honorary Doctor of Divinity degree from the University of Pittsburgh in 1921.

== Career ==
Moore worked as a minister in Presbyterian churches in Goldfield, Colorado (1901–1903), Milwaukee (1903–1906) and Appleton, Wisconsin (1906–1912), and Covington, Kentucky, as well as for Cornell University in Ithaca, New York (1913, 1917). In 1917, during World War I, he served as YMCA Secretary at U.S. Army headquarters in Chaumont, France. In 1918, he was made Dean of Religious Education at the University of Pittsburgh under the Harbison Foundation. During 1918–1920 he also served on the Dean's Council at Pittsburgh.

Lake Forest College baseball team, 1895 (Moore at far left)

Moore was appointed president of his alma mater, Lake Forest College, in the fall of 1920, initially agreeing to serve only one year. He was formally inaugurated on November 4, 1921. In the 1920s, Moore oversaw the separation from the college of preparatory schools Lake Forest Academy and Ferry Hall. Moore personally sponsored the formation of a student band at the college, donating $3,500 in 1926 (a value of more than $66,000 in 2026) for the purchase of instruments. By 1927, he was serving as Vice President of the Association of Presbyterian Colleges. At the beginning of the Great Depression, Moore established a practice of assigning faculty members as counselors of individual first and second year students, to be a source of support for both academic and personal problems. By 1930, he had taken on the William Bross Professorship of Biblical Literature in addition to remaining College president. In 1930–1931 Moore was the

Lake Forest College football team, 1895 (Moore back row, 4th from right)

president of the Federation of Illinois Colleges, and in 1932, of the Presbyterian College Union. He was a member of the National Educational Association, the Society of Biblical Literature and Exegesis, Kiwanis and Rotary Clubs. Moore suffered a heart attack in November 1941, and due to his illness retired from the presidency of Lake Forest College in February, 1942, just a month before his passing.

As president, Moore saw the college's enrollment grow from 167 to 425 students, and paid off its $200,000 debt. This growth was in part credited to his initiating more recruitment efforts in local high schools, along with the offering of scholarships.

== Personal life ==
In 1902, Moore married Abigail Donohue. The couple had a son, Charles Herbert, and daughter, Lindsay. Moore and Abigail would spend summers gardening at their Wisconsin cabin.
