= John S. Nollen =

American college president (1869–1952)

John Scholte Nollen (January 15, 1869—March 14, 1952) was president of Lake Forest University from 1907 to 1917 and president of Grinnell College from 1931 to 1940.

John S. Nollen, 1910

== Biography ==
John S. Nollen was born in Pella, Iowa, on January 15, 1869, to Dutch immigrants Sara Scholte and John Nollen.

From 1883 to 1885, Nollen was a student at the Central College of Iowa. From 1885 to 1887 he taught at the college as an instructor. The next year, Nollen studied at the University of Iowa, completing his Bachelor's degree in 1888. He then worked as a tutor while studying abroad at the Universities of Zurich (Switzerland), Leipzig (Germany), and Paris (France). He received his doctorate from Leipzig University in 1893. From 1893 to 1903 he was professor and chair of modern languages at Iowa College (renamed Grinnell College as of 1909), and from 1903 to 1907 he was professor of German at Indiana University.

In September 1906, Nollen married Emeline Barstow Bartlett, and they had two daughters, Anna Barstow and Emiline Bartlett Nollen. Emiline sadly passed away in 1910. In June 1914, Nollen remarried to Vassar College graduate Louise Stevens Bartlett.

John S. Nollen at work, circa 1917

In April 1907, Nollen was elected president of Lake Forest University in Lake Forest, Illinois. In 1910, his alma mater the University of Iowa awarded him an honorary Doctor of Laws. The same year, Nollen reverted the Lake Forest to its former policy of requiring student attendance at chapel. Nollen spoke publicly about his concern that students' education suffered due to absorption in social life. In 1911, he oversaw the creation of a Department of Citizenship (public affairs). In 1914, he was elected to a six-year term as an Illinois representative of the YMCA. In January 1917, he was elected president of the Association of American Colleges. In November 1917, Nollen took a leave of absence from the presidency to undertake war work for the YMCA, traveling to Italy. He resigned from the Lake Forest University presidency abruptly in December 1917.

From 1918 to 1920, he served as General Secretary of the International Commission of the YWCA's work with the Italian army, dubbed 'Opera Di Fratellanza Universale' or in English, 'Work of Universal Brotherhood.' In 1920 he returned to Grinnell College (formerly Iowa College), serving as their dean from 1920 until 1931, when he was made their acting president. He remained Grinnell College president until his retirement in Summer 1940, at age 71. Nollen died in Des Moines, Iowa on March 14, 1952.

Nollen was an elder in the Presbyterian Church and president of the Presbyterian Social Union of Chicago. He was a member of Phi Beta Kappa, Goethe-Gesellschaft, the Modern Language Association, the University Club of Chicago, and the Bibliographical Society of America.

== Books ==
- Goethes Goetz Von Berlichingen Auf Der Buehne. Leipzig: Oswald Schmidt, 1893.
- A Chronology And Practical Bibliography of Modern German Literature. Chicago: Scott, Foresman and company, 1903.
