= Robert W. Patterson (minister) =

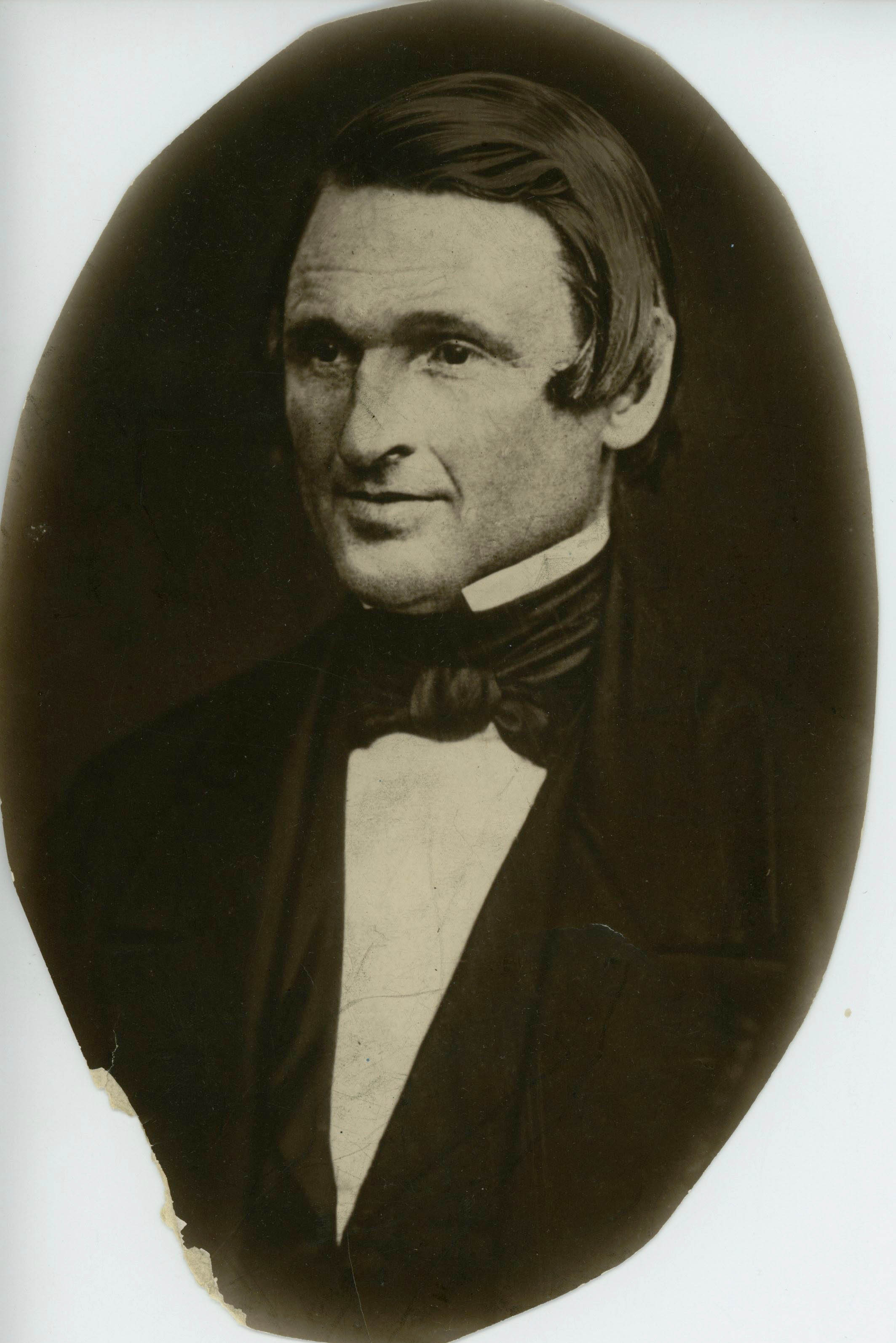
Robert W. Patterson, circa 1854

Robert Wilson Patterson (January 21, 1814 – February 28, 1894) was a Presbyterian minister, theology professor, and a founder of the Lake Forest Association and Lake Forest University in Illinois.

== Early life ==
He was born in Maryville, Tennessee, in 1814 to Alexander Patterson and Sarah Patterson (née Stevenson) as the youngest of six siblings. His parents moved the family from Tennessee to Illinois in 1821 as they were opposed to slavery.

== Education ==
Patterson entered the preparatory department of Illinois College in 1832 and graduated with high honors in 1837. He then enrolled at the Lane Theological Seminary in Cincinnati, Ohio to prepare for the ministry, having joined the Presbyterian Church upon entering college. At Lane Seminary he studied under theologians including Lyman Beecher, Calvin E. Stowe, and Baxter Dickinson. In 1856 he was given a Doctor of Divinity degree from Hamilton College, and in 1889 an honorary Doctor of Laws from Lake Forest University.

== Career ==
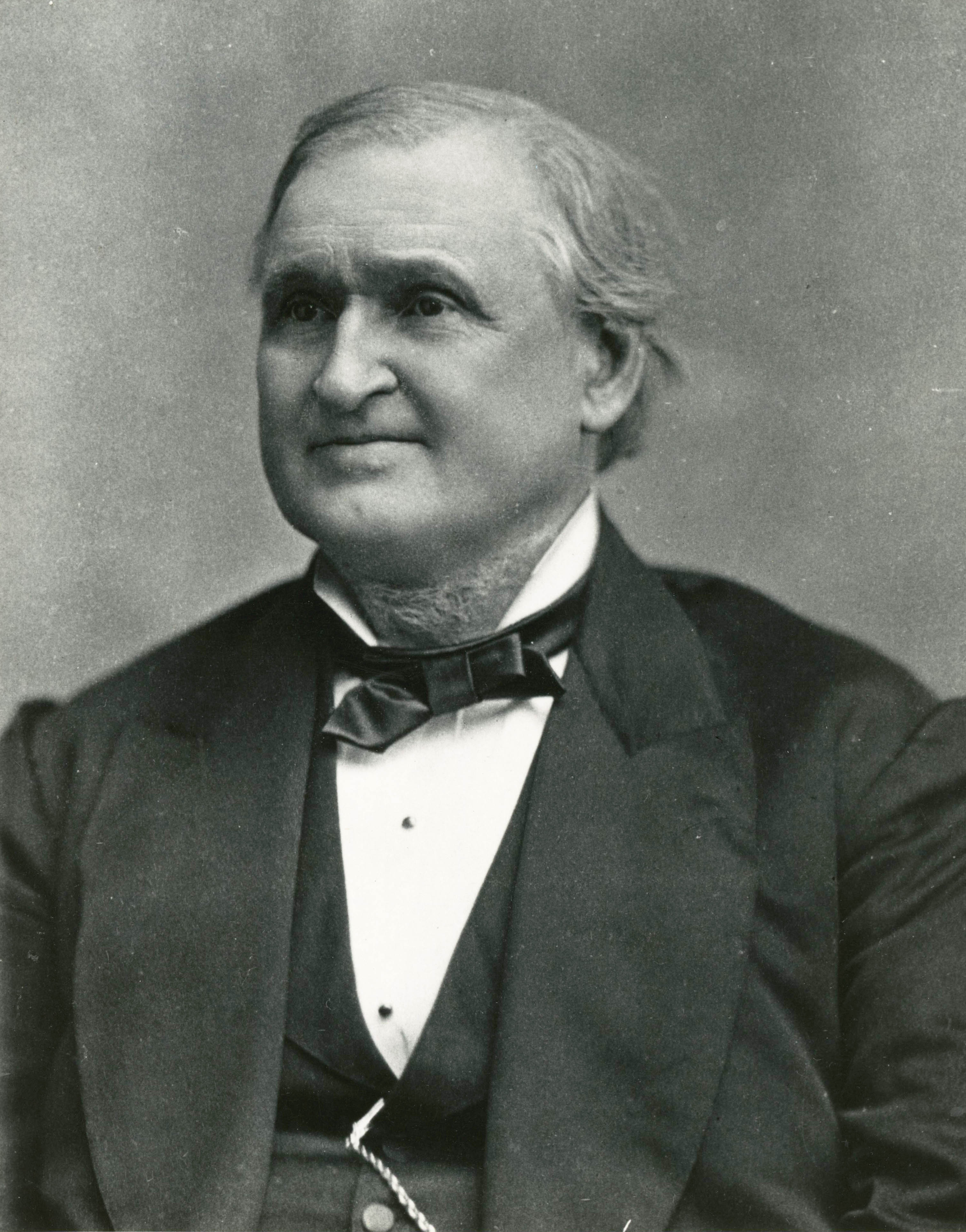
Robert W. Patterson, circa 1880

In 1840, he briefly served as interim preacher at the First Presbyterian Church of Chicago before accepting a position in Monroe, Michigan. Amid divisions among Chicago Presbyterians over abolitionist strategies, Patterson became the first pastor of the newly formed Second Presbyterian Church in 1842, aligning with a conservative anti-slavery position. Patterson's own abolitionist views were informed by his reading of William Lloyd Garrison. During the American Civil War (1861 – 1865) he served in the Freedmen's Aid Bureau and the Sanitary Commission. He served as pastor for most of the Second Presbyterian Church’s first fifty years, resigning the pastorate in 1874, at which point he was named the Church's emeritus pastor. From 1874 until 1881 he served as the Chair of Evidences and Ethics of Christianity at the McCormick Theological Seminary in Chicago, after which he lectured at the Lane Theological Seminary for the following three winters.

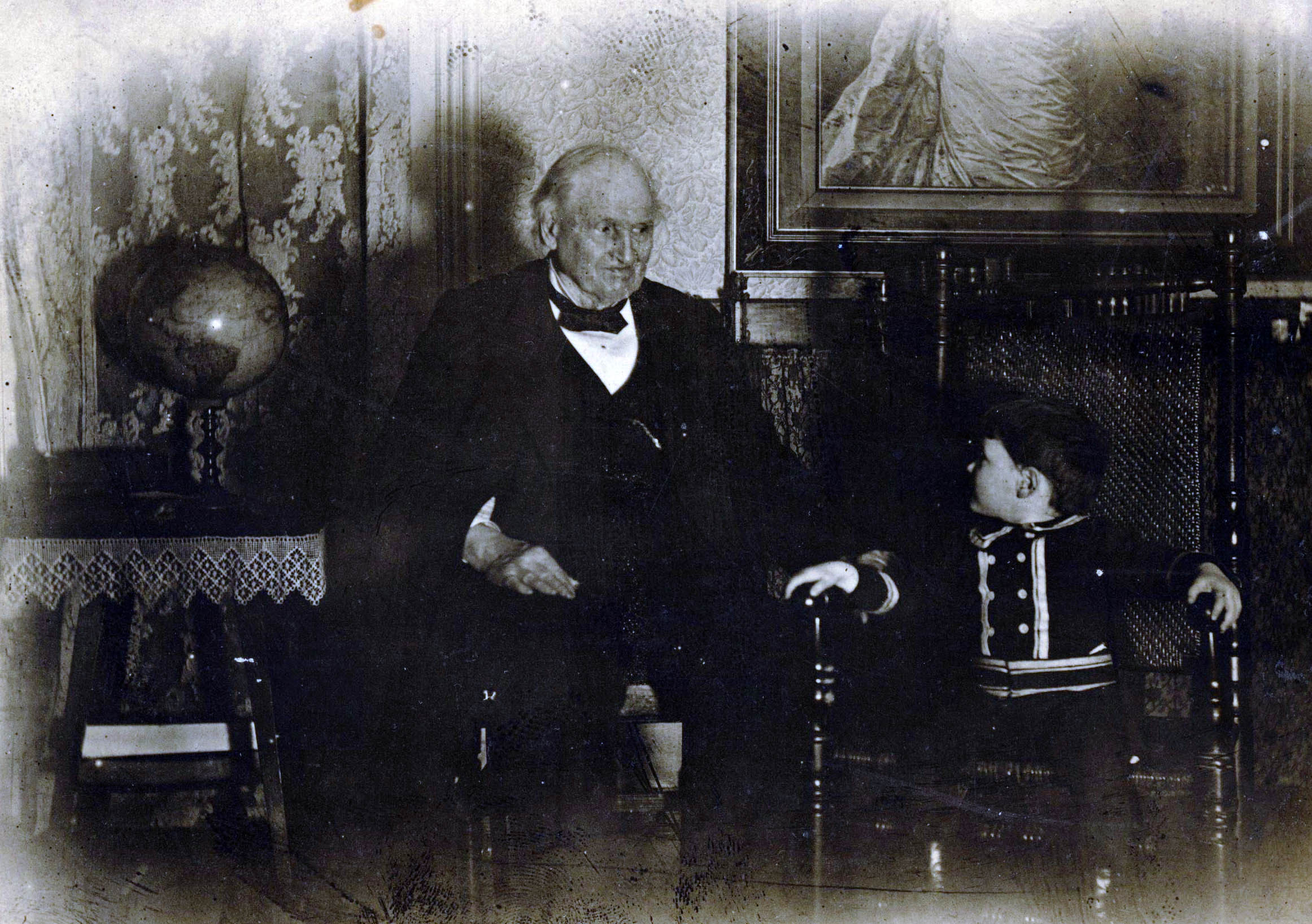
Robert W. Patterson with grandson Joseph Medill Patterson, circa 1883

== Personal life ==
Patterson married Julia A. Quigley in May 1843. They had ten children together, six of whom survived into adulthood: Robert Jr., John, Raymond, Julia (Cross), Josephine (Phillips), and Grace (Ewen). Patterson's son Robert Wilson Patterson Jr. (1850–1910) married Elinor Medill (1855–1933), daughter of Joseph Medill (1823–1899). Patterson's grandchildren via Elinor and Robert Jr. were Joseph Medill Patterson (1879–1946) and Eleanor Josephine Medill Patterson (1884–1948), both of whom went on to have successful careers in news publishing. Patterson resided in Chicago from 1843 to 1874, then in Highland Park and briefly in Lake Forest, before returning to Chicago in 1877. In 1885, he and his family moved to a home in Evanston, where he spent his final years. He died in Evanston, Illinois, at the age of 80. He is buried in Graceland Cemetery.

== Contributions to Lake Forest University ==
Patterson played a central role in founding the town of Lake Forest, Illinois, and Lake Forest University. Alongside Harvey Curtis, pastor of the First Presbyterian Church of Chicago, and with support from local business leaders, he helped organize the Lake Forest Association in 1856 to secure land and funding with the intent of founding a Presbyterian educational institution. After surveying sites north of Chicago off of the North Western Railway, Patterson and Curtis selected the Lake Forest location. Approximately 2,300 acres (930 ha) were acquired by the Association, with 62 acres set aside for the university campus, and the remainder developed into the town of Lake Forest. The project received support from the synod of the New School Presbyterian Church and the university was chartered by the Illinois legislature in February 1857. Patterson helped establish Lake Forest University and served as the first president of its coeducational Collegiate Department from 1875 August to 1878 March, as well as one of its first twenty trustees, from 1857 to 1877.
