= WMXM =

- Lake Forest, Illinois; United States
- Frequency: 88.9 MHz
- Branding: Lake Forest College Radio

Programming
- Format: College

Ownership
- Owner: Lake Forest College

Technical information
- Licensing authority: FCC
- Facility ID: 36309
- Class: A
- ERP: 295 watts
- HAAT: 29.0 meters (95.1 ft)
- Transmitter coordinates: 42°15′0.00″N 87°49′45.00″W

Links
- Public license information: Public file; LMS
- Webcast: Listen live
- Website: Official website

WMXM is an independent college radio station at Lake Forest College, in Lake Forest, Illinois.

The current stated goal of the station is to provide listeners an alternative to commercial radio through unique programming and music selection. The station broadcasts 24/7/365 with concentrations in indie rock, hip hop, and loud rock. The station also offers live news updates and features the syndicated news program Democracy Now!.

== History ==
WMXM 88.9 FM student radio DJ, 1980

WMXM 88.9 FM originated from AM student radio station WLFC 640. WLFC was established at Lake Forest College in Fall 1950.

The origins of student radio at the College started in Spring 1923 when two students built their own transmitter on campus and were granted a license to go on air, under call letters WABA. Their license expired in July 1923. In Fall 1923, a new license was issued in the name of Lake Forest University, also with call letters WABA. This station was licensed from Fall 1923-July 1924 and from January-July 1925. Broadcasts included experimental work in radio communication and a few regular entertainment programs, but nothing educational, unlike later iterations of the college station. In 1942, the College began offering a course in Radio Techniques under the Department of Speech and Dramatics, and the Catalog included section 'Radio Production' under 'Suggestions for Study in Preparation for Professions.' The Radio Techniques class set up a workshop on the ground floor of the Durand Art Institute, where they practiced performing news casts, commercials, and radio plays, and studied principles of announcing, sound effects, and other techniques. In the 1950s this work was led by faculty radio director in the Speech Department, Elizabeth Mumford, and in the 1960s by Jean E. Kirchner, director of Radio and Television.

A Radio Club formed on campus during academic year 1949-1950, with students being featured on newly created Waukegan radio station WKRS, owned by The News-Sun Broadcasting Company. In Spring 1950, fraternities and sororities fund-raised to provide a studio for a new student radio station. This next iteration of student radio, WLFC 640 AM, was established in Fall 1950. The first station manger of WLFC was Ray Geraci, Class of 1951. Beginning in 1954, the College had formed a faculty committee on 'Radio-TV.' Along with several student-produced programs, WLFC broadcast college football, baseball, and basketball games. By the 1967, its coverage had expanded to include music and events on campus such as visiting speaker convocations and meetings of student government.

During the transition from AM to FM radio in Summer 1973, the WLFC call sign was changed to WMXM. This was because the Federal Communications Commissions had granted the WLFC call-letters to another college before the Lake Forest College station was approved to go FM. At the time of the transition, the station manager was Pete Peterson, Class of 1974. To facilitate the transition, an antennae was constructed on top of College Hall (now Brown Hall) and a new crystal was installed in their transmitter.

Student staff positions included engineer, D.J., news reporting, and music library roles, and the organization provided training for volunteers without experience in radio. Funding for equipment and supplies was allocated from the Lake Forest College Board of Trustees and from Student Government. In January 1974, under purview of station manager Richard Wood, Class of 1975, the station had only ten watts of signal power. This was increased to three hundred watts in 1978, expanding the broadcast radius from 7 square miles (encompassing Lake Forest, Lake Bluff, Highwood, and northeast Deerfield) to 25 square miles.

WLFC 640 AM student radio DJ, 1965

Along with free-form radio playing rock and jazz, the station played live broadcasts of concerts, news about on-campus events, PSAs from College security, and coverage of College sports in collaboration with Athletics and The Stentor student journalists. WMXM has aired interviews with prominent figures including Frank Zappa, Louis Gambaccini, and Edward Morgan. WMXM sought listener input on music, welcoming students to have their own regular show on the station. To increase their listening audience, the station began to distribute program schedules. The College's Cultural Office introduced a foreign language program in Fall 1974. By Spring 1976, under station manager Fred Garfield, Class of 1977, 28 students broadcast their own shows weekly, and the music library had grown to more than 7,000 albums. All student broadcasters were required to get their third class license to show awareness of regulations and basic technology. In Fall 1976, the station received a United Press International wire to expand their news coverage. As a non-profit, WMXM does not broadcast advertisements, but in 1976 it began seeking local sponsors to place ads in its printed program guides. Eventual sponsors include the First National Bank of Lake Forest and Northbrook shop, The Branch. In 1977, radio enthusiast and alumnus Howard Knaack, Class of 1937, donated funds enabling the station to update equipment and renovate its space. In 1980, WMXM's formal constitution put forth its five goals:

"1.) To provide the students of Lake Forest College with first hand knowledge and experience in radio communication.

2.) To provide the College and surrounding community with entertainment, public service, and information.

3.) To improve the quality of the station and sound as professional as possible within the framework of a student-operated, non-commercial system.

4.) To become an integral part of both the campus and the surrounding community and, in doing so, improve relations between members of those two communities.

5.) To encourage greater participation of the college population in WMXM. WMXM will strive to maintain diversity in programming to provide opportunities for involvement for any interested persons."

The 1980 constitution also outlined official staff positions: Program Director, Music Director, Business Manager, Sponsorship Director, News Director, Sports Director, Technical Supervisor, Publicity Directory, Public Service and Special Features Director, and Secretary. In 1982, the radio station was relocated from the basement of Reid Hall and rewired in the basement of Stuart Commons. This was also the first year the station boasted 24 hours of programming. By 1985, WMXM was sponsoring live band performances and ticket raffles, and fundraising for its own operations and the College's Christopher C. Mojekwu Fund for Intercultural Understanding with an annual DJ Marathon (students broadcasting for 6, 12, or 24 hours straight) in the spring semester. In 1997, the station was still going strong with nearly 50 student members.

As of Fall 2002, WMXM began storing and accessing music as MP3 files via computer, which counteracted the reoccurring problem of CDs and LPs being stolen from the station's library. As early as 2005, WMXM began supplementing its FM broadcasts with internet broadcasts, reaching listeners as far as Rome, Italy. In Spring 2010 the radio station's broadcast radius was increased to encompass nearly all of Lake County, with help from the College's Facilities Management, Information Technology Services, and alumnus John Hogan, Class of 1979 and CEO of Clear Channel Radio. In Fall 2010, the radio station began collaborating with student group Playaz Club Productions to host dance parties on campus in Hixon Hall. Other collaborative concerts hosted on campus include Uncle Cracker, the Plain White Tees, Nnamdi Ogbonnaya, and Chris Cohen. In Spring 2021, WMXM hosted their first virtual concert broadcast from New York featuring psychedelic musical project Debris of Titan.
