= Lake Forest College =

Private college in Lake Forest, Illinois, US

- Former names: Lind University (1857–1865); Lake Forest University (1865–1965)
- Motto: Et veritas liberabit vos (Latin)
- Motto in English: And the truth shall set you free (John 8:32)
- Type: Private liberal arts college
- Established: 1857; 169 years ago
- Religious affiliation: Nonsectarian; Presbyterian (historically)
- Academic affiliations: ACM; Annapolis Group; Oberlin Group; CLAC; APCU
- Endowment: $114.9 million (2023)
- President: Michael J. Sosulski
- Provost: Tara Natarajan
- Faculty: 178
- Students: 1,800
- Location: Lake Forest, Illinois, U.S. 42.2496°N 87.8285°W
- Campus: Suburban, 107 acres (43 ha)
- Colors: Red & black
- Nickname: Foresters
- Sporting affiliations: NCAA Division III; Midwest, NCHA
- Mascot: Boomer the Bear
- Website: lakeforest.edu

Lake Forest College is a private liberal arts college in Lake Forest, Illinois, United States. Founded in 1857 as Lind University by a group of Presbyterian ministers, the college has been coeducational since 1876 and an undergraduate-focused liberal arts institution since 1903. Lake Forest enrolls approximately 1,800 students representing 43 states and 114 countries. Lake Forest offers 34 undergraduate majors and 49 minor programs in the humanities, social sciences, and natural sciences, and features programs of study in pre-law, pre-medicine, communication, business, finance, and computer science. Most students live on the college's wooded 107-acre (43 ha) campus located 0.5 miles (0.80 km) from the Lake Michigan shore; however, the population of commuting students has increased in the past few years.

Lake Forest is affiliated with the Associated Colleges of the Midwest. The college has 23 varsity teams that compete in the NCAA Division III Midwest Conference.

== History ==
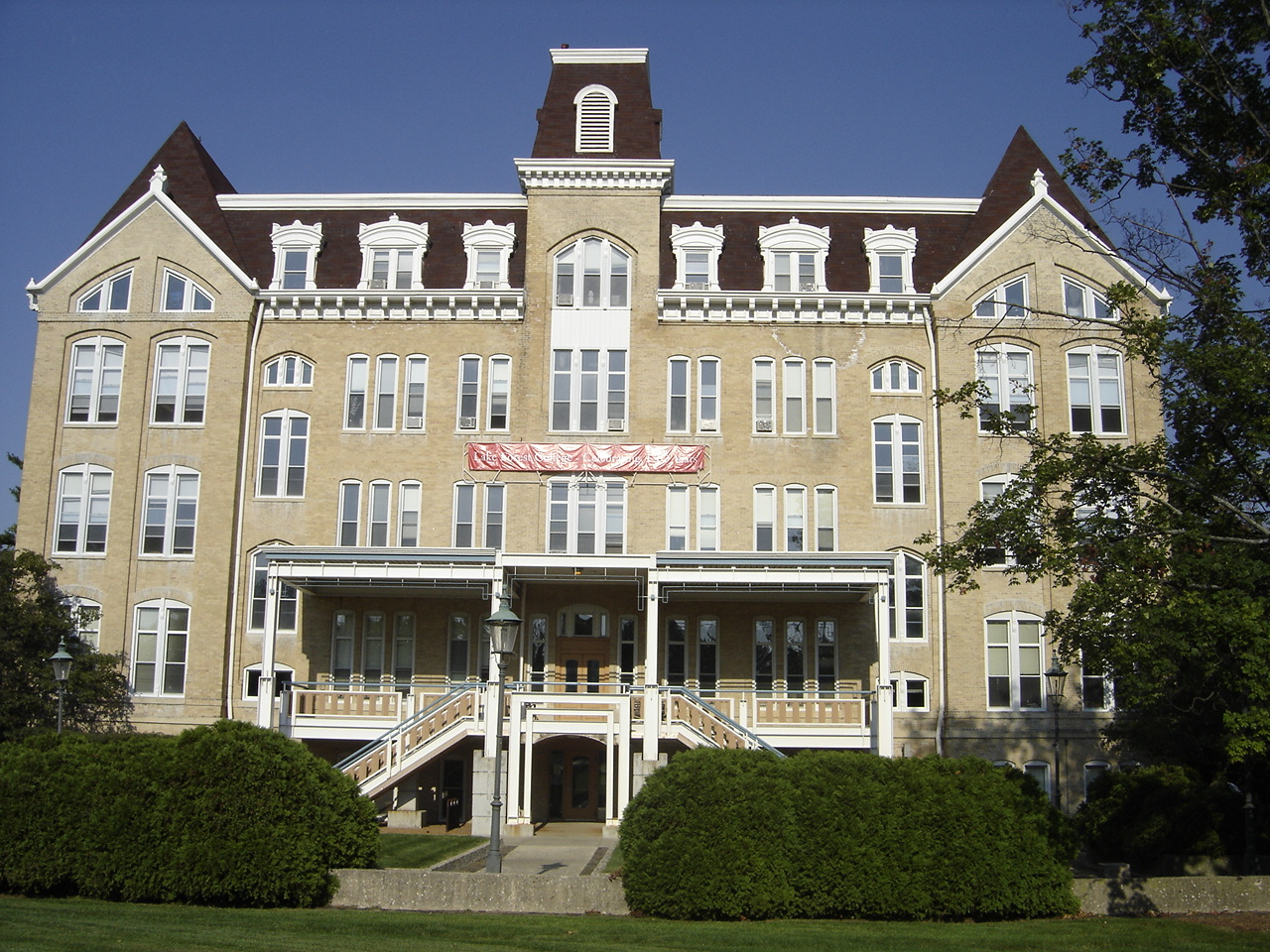
Brown Hall, the tallest building in the city of Lake Forest, houses most of the humanities departments on campus

Lake Forest College was founded in 1857 by Reverend Robert W. Patterson as a Presbyterian alternative to the Methodist Northwestern University in Evanston. It was originally named Lind University after Sylvester Lind, who had pledged $80,000 (Note: equivalent to $2,764,286 in 2025) to launch the school. Patterson and his fellow Chicago Presbyterians formed the Lake Forest Association (led by Hiram F. Mather) to establish the town of Lake Forest and the university roughly halfway between Evanston and Waukegan two years after the Chicago and Milwaukee Railway began service from Chicago. They hired St. Louis landscape architect Almerin Hotchkiss to design the town of Lake Forest with a university park at its center. Hotchkiss used the area's wooded ravines and forest as guidelines to design the town.

Lake Forest Academy, a boys' preparatory school, began offering classes in 1858; collegiate-level courses began in 1860. By the mid-1860s, a small New England–style village had been established with an academy building, a Presbyterian church, and several homes. The school had a medical college (Lind Medical School) from 1859 to 1863, which later became independent and eventually became part of Northwestern University, now known as the Northwestern University Feinberg School of Medicine.

In 1865, the name became Lake Forest University. In 1869 Ferry Hall, a girls' preparatory school and junior college, opened as a division of the university led by Fannie Ruth Robinson. It later merged with Lake Forest Academy in 1974.

In 1876 Mary Eveline Smith Farwell started Lake Forest College, a coeducational division of the university, under the leadership of the Reverend Patterson. In 1878, College Hall (now Brown Hall) was built following a fire that destroyed the former hotel being used for classes.

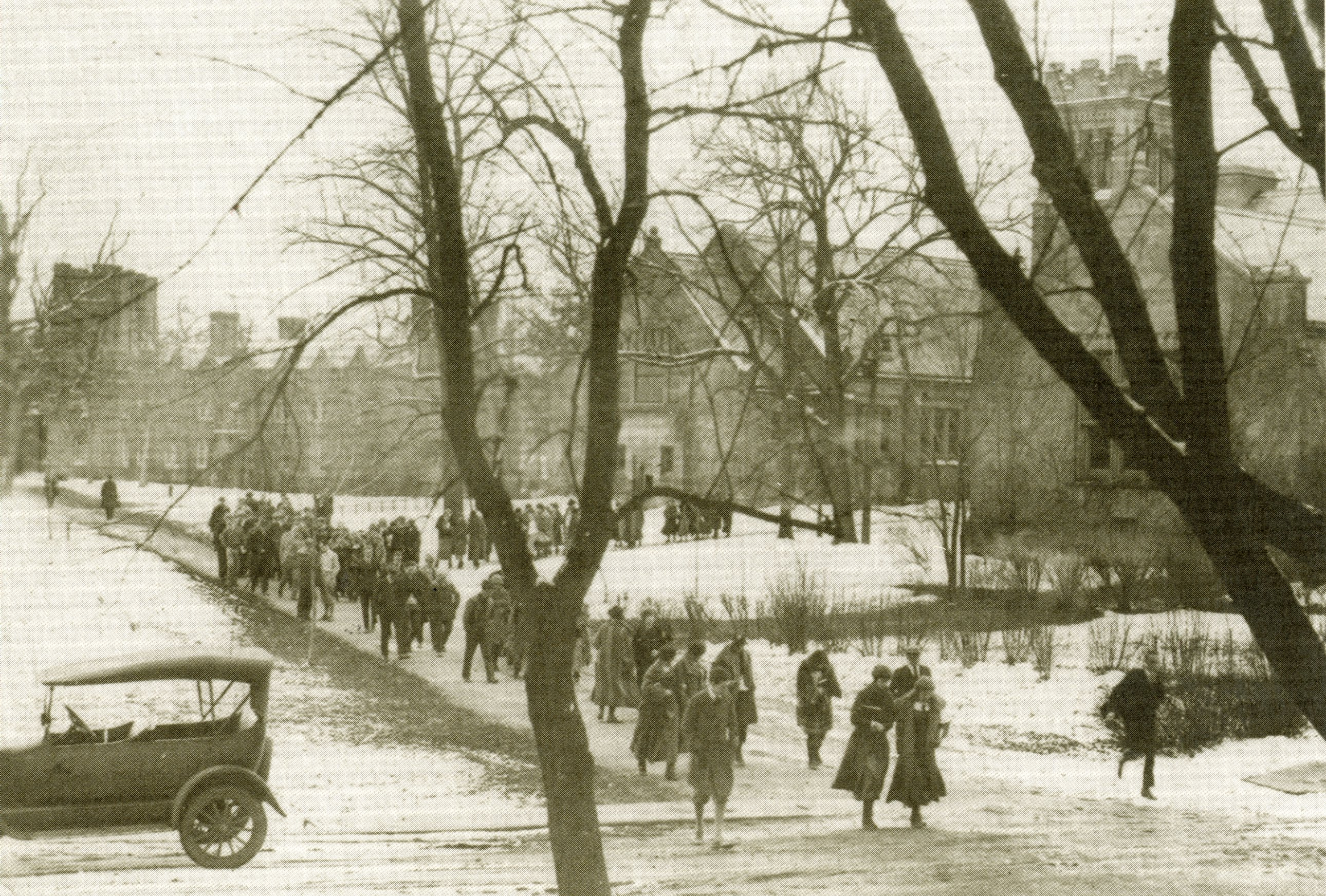
Lake Forest College campus in winter, circa 1915.

James Gore King McClure arrived in Lake Forest in 1881 as the pastor of the Presbyterian Church. Under his influence over the next 50 years, the college experienced a large transition "from a pluralistic graduate and professional emphasis to a singular undergraduate liberal arts focus," says former Lake Forest College archivist Art Miller (1996–2013), who co-wrote the 2000 book 30 Miles North: A History of Lake Forest College, Its Town, and Its City of Chicago.

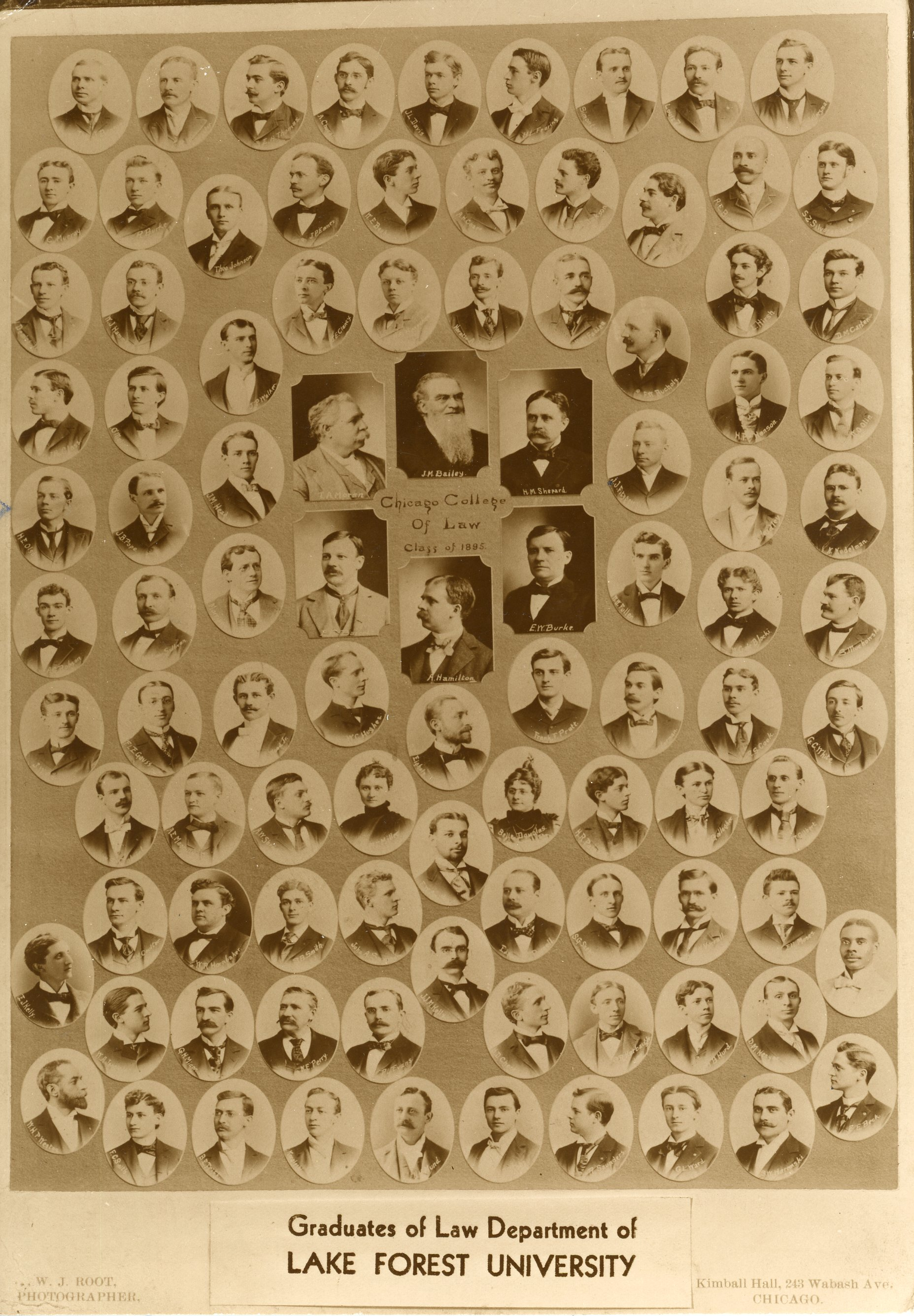
Law Department, Class of 1895

In summer of 1887 Rush Medical College became the medical department of Lake Forest University; this relationship was dissolved in 1898 when Rush affiliated with the University of Chicago. Also in 1887 Lake Forest established a relationship with the Northwestern College of Dental Surgery (shortly thereafter known as the Chicago College of Dental Surgery), Chicago's first dental school, to serve as its dental department. In 1889 the Chicago College of Law became the legal department of the university. Lake Forest's affiliation with the Chicago College of Dental Surgery and the Chicago-Kent College of Law was ended in 1902 following a 1901 vote by the board of trustees to divest entirely of the professional schools.

The Lake Forest School of Music opened in 1916, affiliated with Ferry Hall until 1918 when it became an independent division of the university. The School of Music incorporated and extended the courses in music hitherto given in other departments, offering a four-year course of study leading to a degree of Bachelor of Music, and was directed by Marta Milinowski, who went on to be Professor of Music at Vassar College from 1930 to 1950. The School of Music operated through 1922; in 1928 a department of music was established at Lake Forest College. A Summer School of Landscape Architecture was opened in Summer 1916 in cooperation with the University of Illinois following interest and support from the Garden Club of Lake Forest and trustees of both institutions; the Summer School was directed by Ralph R. Root, Professor of Landscape Architecture at the University of Illinois. It ceased to exist after 1919 due to low enrollment, but a later iteration, the Foundation for Architecture and Landscape Architecture, offered summer courses on the Lake Forest College campus from 1926 to 1931.

In June, 1925, the Lake Forest University Trustees sold the two preparatory schools Lake Forest Academy and Ferry Hall, and the school's focus was narrowed to undergraduate liberal arts at Lake Forest College.

In 1960, William Graham Cole, from Williams College, took over as president and brought with him Eastern faculty and students, further diversifying the campus. During his time as president, in 1965, the school's name was officially changed to Lake Forest College. In March 2010, the college received $7 million (Note: equivalent to $10.3 million in 2025) from Class of 1931 alumna Grace Groner.

== Academics ==
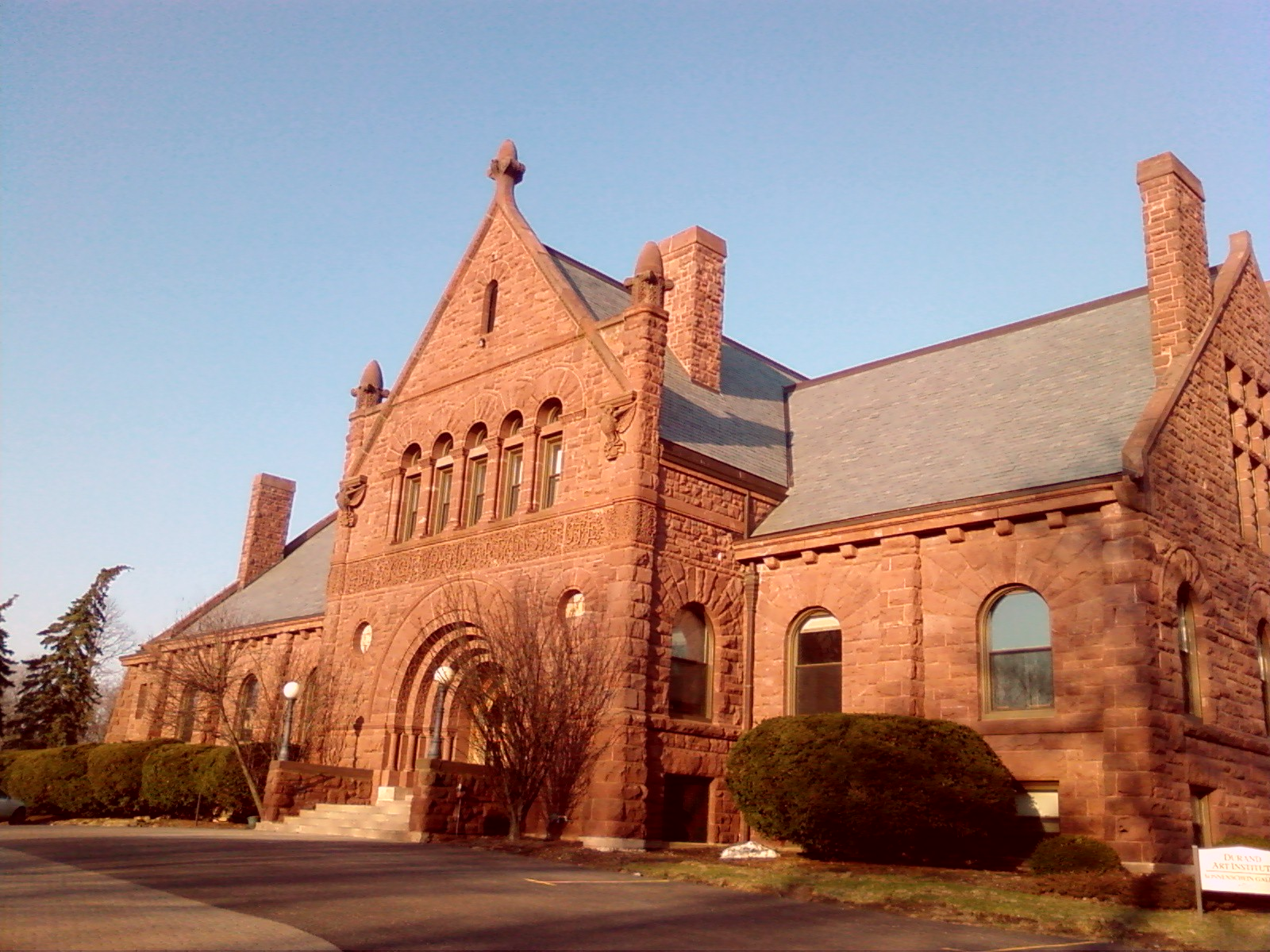
Durand Art Institute on North Campus houses the departments of Art and Philosophy

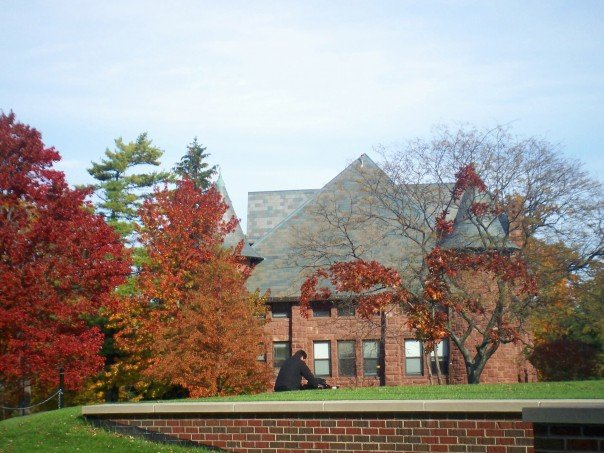
Lake Forest College autumn

Lake Forest's three most popular undergraduate majors, by 2021 graduates, were Business/Commerce (62), Research & Experimental Psychology (37), and Finance (24). The college has 34 majors, 49 minors, 15 accelerated programs and affiliations, and three pre-professional programs. Students can declare up to two majors and one minor, or one major and two minors. The year includes two 15-week semesters and three four-week terms in the summer session. The college serves adults living in the region through the Office of Community Education, offering a Master of Liberal Studies (M/LS) program and Master's of Arts in Teaching (MAT) program.

=== Rankings ===
- The Princeton Review
  - 2021: #4 "Best Science Lab Facilities," #9 "Best Counseling Services," #9 "Best Health Services," #14 "Top 20 Best Schools for Internships (Private Schools)"
  - 2019: #9 "Best Colleges for Internships," #12 "Best Alumni Network," #20 "Most Popular Study Abroad Program," #20 "Best College Library"
- U.S. News & World Report
  - 2021: #2 "Top Performers on Social Mobility," #33 "Best Value Schools," #84 "National Liberal Arts Colleges"
  - 2019: #45 "Best Value School"
- Washington Monthly
  - 2020: #15 "Best Bang for the Buck," #37 "Best Liberal Arts Colleges"
  - 2019: #39 "Best Bang for the Buck," #52 "Liberal Arts"

== Admission ==
According to the Carnegie Foundation for the Advancement of Teaching and U.S. News & World Report, Lake Forest is considered to be a "more selective" institution, with a lower rate of transfer-in students.

Lake Forest College's admissions selectivity rank according to The Princeton Review is 88 out of 99. This ranking is determined by several institutionally-reported factors, including: the class rank, average standardized test scores, and average high school GPA of entering freshmen; the percentage of students who come from out-of-state; and the percentage of applicants accepted.

== Student life ==
Approximately 1,800 students attend the college, and about 75% live on campus in one of the eleven residence halls. Lake Forest has more than 80 clubs and organizations, the largest and most active being: the student radio station (WMXM), Student Government, PRIDE (LGBTQ+), Student Programming Board (SPB) (organizes on-campus entertainment) and the Greek organizations.

Located 30 miles (48 km) north of Chicago, Lake Forest College is roughly an hour's commute from the city. The Metra rail line, located in downtown Lake Forest, is a 15-minute walk from campus, where trains run approximately 25 times per day.

About 86% of students participate in off-campus internships and 40% participate in a study abroad program.

=== Publications and media ===
There are six active media organizations on campus:

- The Stentor is the school-sponsored student-run newspaper

The Stentor was formerly published weekly, is currently published monthly, and has been in publication since June 1887. Online archives for twelve issues exist for the year 2011/2012.

- Inter-Text is a student-run academic journal for the social sciences and humanities.
- Tusitala, first printed in 1935, is the college's annual literary magazine
- Collage is a magazine featuring works primarily written in foreign languages
- Eukaryon is a life-science research journal publishing student work
- WMXM is a student-run radio station providing an alternative to mainstream radio
- Spectrum was a publication for faculty, staff, students, alumni and friends, published from 1964 until 2017
- Black Rap, first published from 1968-1987 and rebooted in 2020-2021, was the Black student newspaper and creative outlet

=== Athletics ===
Lake Forest Foresters athletics wordmark

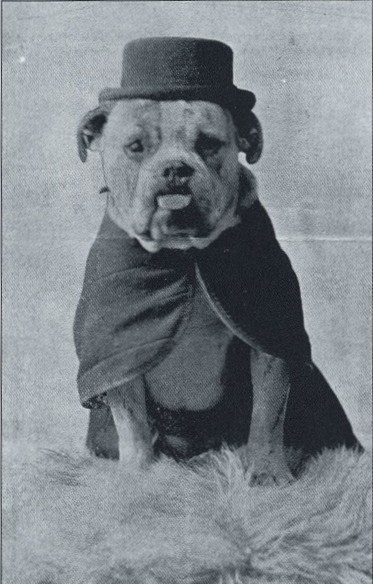
"Bart," the blind bulldog mascot of the 1894 football team

Lake Forest teams, nicknamed the Foresters, compete in NCAA Division III (except handball) and offers 23 varsity sports, 12 women's (basketball, cross country, distance indoor track, distance outdoor track, handball, ice hockey, soccer, softball, swimming and diving, tennis, golf, and volleyball) and 11 men's (basketball, cross country, distance indoor track, distance outdoor track, football, handball, ice hockey, soccer, swimming and diving, golf and tennis).

The handball teams have won 49 national championships and have received national media attention. The handball team competes in Division I through USHA (not NCAA).

Lake Forest College has been a member of the Midwest Conference since 1974. It was a member of the College Conference of Illinois and Wisconsin from 1946 to 1963, and of the Illinois Intercollegiate Athletic Conference from 1919 to 1937. Lake Forest College attended the original 1895 meeting that led to the formation of the now-Division I Big Ten Conference, but never actually participated in athletics or any other activities in that conference.
