= Hiram F. Mather =

American politician

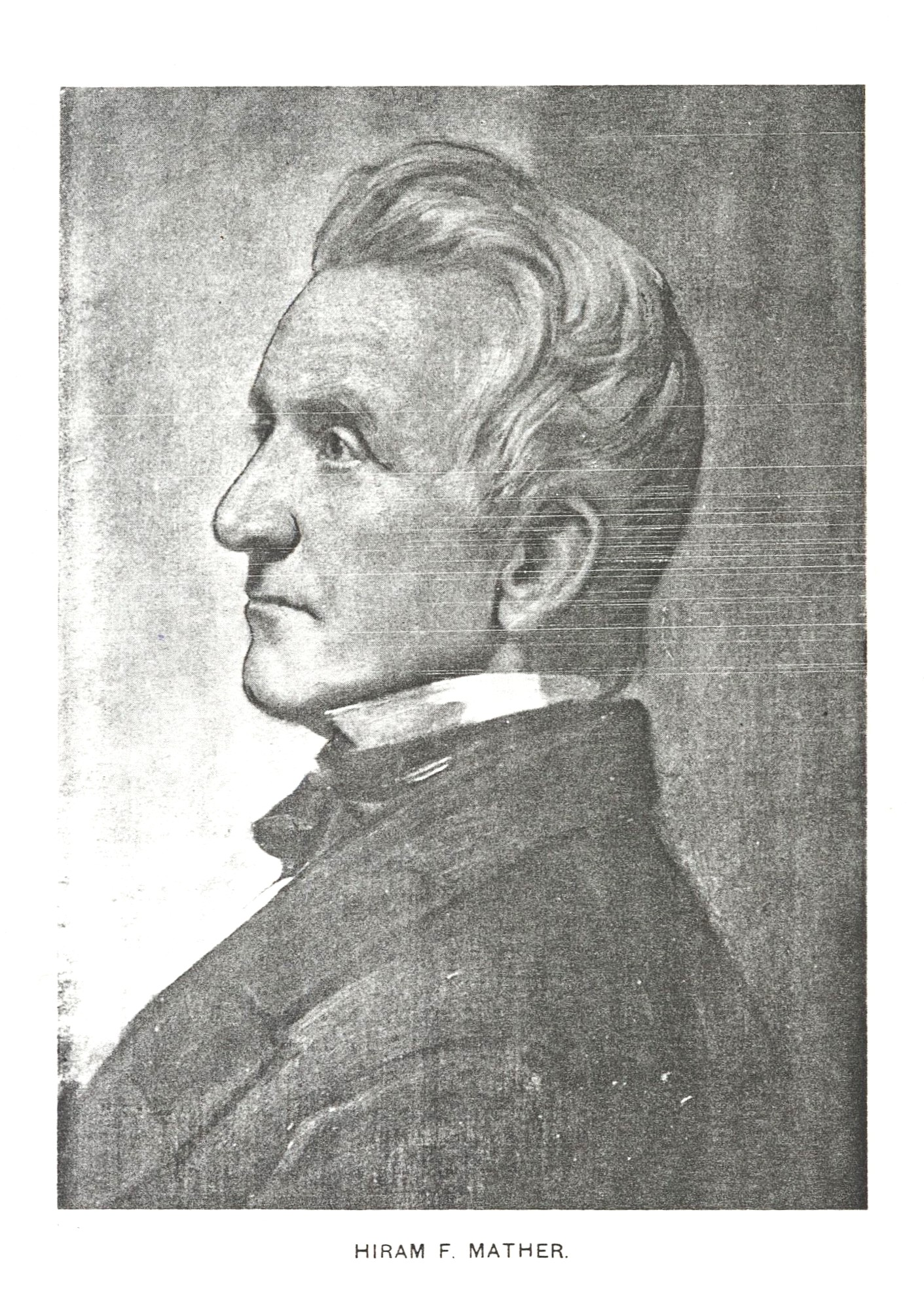
Hiram F. Mather portrait

Hiram Foote Mather (February 13, 1796 Colchester, Connecticut –July 11, 1868 Chicago, Illinois) was an American lawyer and politician from New York.

== Biography ==
Hiram F. Mather was the son of Gibbons Mather and Hannah (Foote) Mather, and a descendant of Richard Mather, who was brother of Increase Mather and uncle of preacher Cotton Mather. He graduated from Yale College in 1813 at only 17 years old, having studied under Timothy Dwight. After, he studied theology at Andover Seminary, but abandoned this after two years as a result of family obligations after his father's death, and instead studied law at Auburn, New York. He was later a trustee of Auburn Theological Seminary from 1929 to 1945. He was admitted to the bar in 1819, and practiced in Elbridge, Onondaga County, New York, where he also served as postmaster. He became charter trustee and treasurer for Monro Academy (later Munro Collegiate Institute) in Elbridge in 1839.

On April 8, 1821, he married Sarah Anne Hyde (1800–1824), and they had two children. On November 26, 1831, he married Mary Parsons Cole (1806–1855), and they had eight children.

He was an Anti-Masonic member of the New York State Senate (7th D.) from 1829 to 1832, sitting in the 52nd, 53rd, 54th and 55th New York State Legislatures. While Senator, he was appointed to the Court of Review of the New York Supreme Court.

New York State Senate
| Preceded by John C. Spencer | New York State Senate; Seventh District (Class 2); 1829–1832 | Succeeded by Samuel L. Edwards |

In 1844, he removed to Niles, Michigan, and in 1853 to Chicago, where he became an elder of the Third Presbyterian Church until 1857. He was a founder and the first president of the Yale Club of Chicago in 1866. From 1862 until his death he was an elder of the Second Presbyterian Church (Chicago). In 1856, he became the first president of the Lake Forest Association that developed the land of Lake Forest, Illinois and financed Lake Forest University. He was a trustee of Lake Forest University from 1857 until his death. On October 15, 1857, he married Anna Talman Smith Norton. They lived at 193 S Wabash Ave in Chicago. He served as a Master in Chancery for the Superior Court of Chicago for several years in the 1860s. At the time of his passing, his law practice was Mather & Wheeler.

== Further sources ==
- The New York Civil List compiled by Franklin Benjamin Hough (pages 128 and 143; Weed, Parsons and Co., 1858)
- Death of Hon. Hiram F. Mather in the New York Times on July 14, 1868
- Obituary Record of Yale Graduates (who died 1867-68) (pg. 267)
- Mather genealogy
