= Black Rap =

Black Rap was a publication created by Black students at Lake Forest College in Lake Forest, Illinois, beginning in Fall 1968 as a response to the Civil Rights Movement and the assassination of Dr. Martin Luther King Jr. in April.

Black Rap student staff, circa 1972

== History ==
The original run of Black Rap lasted from Fall 1968 until Winter 1986–1987. Three subsequent issues were published in 2020–2021 by Lake Forest College students inspired by the original publication. The scope of Black Rap as stated in Volume 1, Issue 1, was:

"to satisfy the needs of the Black students on campus... It will only contain articles that are relevant to the Blacks on campus and the community at large. Black Rap is primarily for the use of Black artists, however articles deemed relevant by the editorial staff will be accepted by anyone."

Its news coverage included not only the Chicago area but national and international (Pan-African) issues. Creative works included poetry, prose, and graphic arts. At the time of its creation, Black Rap had seven student staff; six editors, and one business manager. Several special issues were written by solely Black first year students. The first issue by first year students included a survey of the college's Black students about their beliefs and experiences at the predominantly white institution, and their feedback for the student organization Black Students for Black Action (BSBA). Articles includes reflections on the complexity and significance of race, the history of Black Americans and the African diaspora, and reporting on contemporaneous political action and thought. Also included were uplifting reports on the activities and achievements of Black students on campus, and rallying of support. Reprints of reporting from other publications, including The Stentor (Lake Forest College's official student newspaper), were sometimes intermixed with original articles. By Fall 1970, Black Rap was reported to circulate in five-hundred schools and colleges.

Reporting in Black Rap had tangible effects on campus; in Fall 1970 accusations of racism by a student against a professor resulted in an investigation into the incident by College administration. Black Rap was funded largely by supporters outside of the Lake Forest College Student Government, unlike other student publications. While the publication was distributed on the college campus, it was also mailed out to alumni and external subscribers. A 1974 article in the college's magazine Spectrum describes Black Rap as "a national publication of the Black community."

Archival issues were digitized by Courtney King (Lake Forest College Class of 2013) and Jade Perkins (Class of 2014) and made available on Lake Forest College's website. Original editions are held by libraries nationwide, and at the International Institute of Social History in the Netherlands.
