= The Stentor =

Student run college newspaper 1887

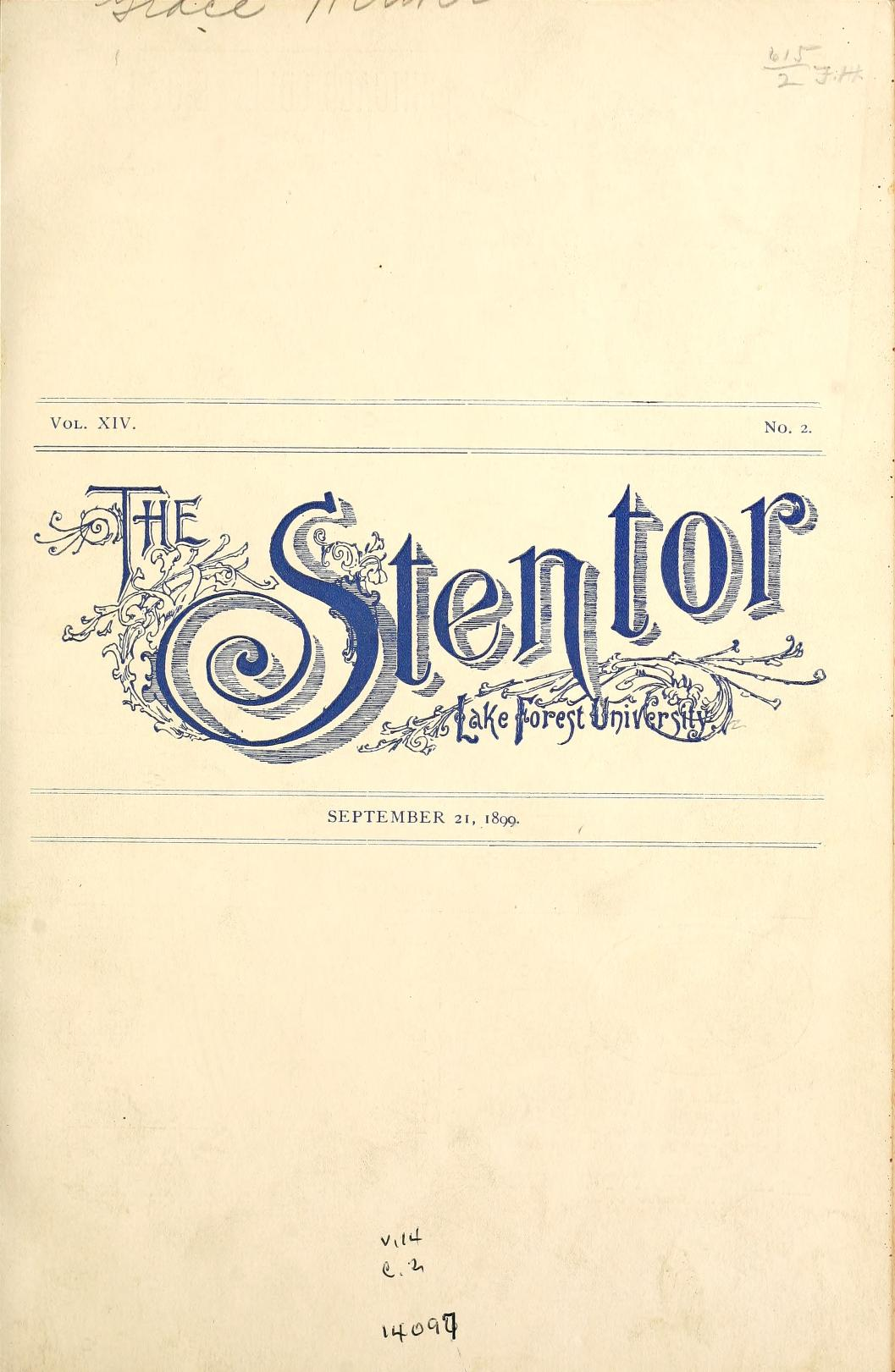
- September 1899 cover of The Stentor
- Type: Student newspaper
- Owner: Lake Forest College
- Founder(s): J.J. Boggs, C.H. French
- Editor-in-chief: Sammie Ross
- Founded: June 1887
- Website: https://stentornews.com

The Stentor is the student-run news organization for Lake Forest College in Lake Forest, Illinois, first published in June of 1887. It serves as the College's official student newspaper of record, covering campus news, features, opinion pieces, sports, and arts.

== History ==
The Stentor was established in 1887 as The L.F.U. Stentor, making it the oldest student publication affiliated with Lake Forest College. Its title is a nod to the herald Stentor from Homer's Illiad. It was first published monthly, at a cost of one dollar per year's subscription, or fifteen cents per edition.The founding editorial staff consisted of two members of the Class of 1888: J.J. Boggs - Editor in Chief, and C.H. French - Alumni and Personal; and four members of the Class of 1889: A.G. Welch - Business Manager, Keyes Becker - Local, B.M. Linnell - Exchange, and G.A. Wilson - Advertising. Post Office Box 177 in Lake Forest was the declared destination of incoming letters. The stated reason for The Stentor's founding was simply to fill a void in communication:

"That the publication of a paper for the benefit of our undergraduates and Alumni has been long needed, is felt by every one. The defunct Review had a different aim, and so failed to satisfy this want.- The object of the present endeavor is to produce a paper which will be entirely under the management of the students, and for their especial benefit."

However it was noted that the timing coincided nicely with the inauguration of the new University President Reverend William C. Roberts, following the eight year term of Reverend Daniel Gregory. The Review mentioned was the Lake Forest University Review, first published in January 1880 with a focus on "Literary, Scientific, and Educational" writings rather than news; by 1884 it had ceased publication. The June 5, 1903 edition of The Stentor includes a retrospective article, "The Founding of The Stentor," by former member of the Class of 1888 Lloyd M. Berger. He reflects on the goals of its founding:

"It was felt that such a periodical would promote good-fellowship and foster university spirit in its broadest sense, and at the same time bring us in closer touch with other institutions of higher learning."

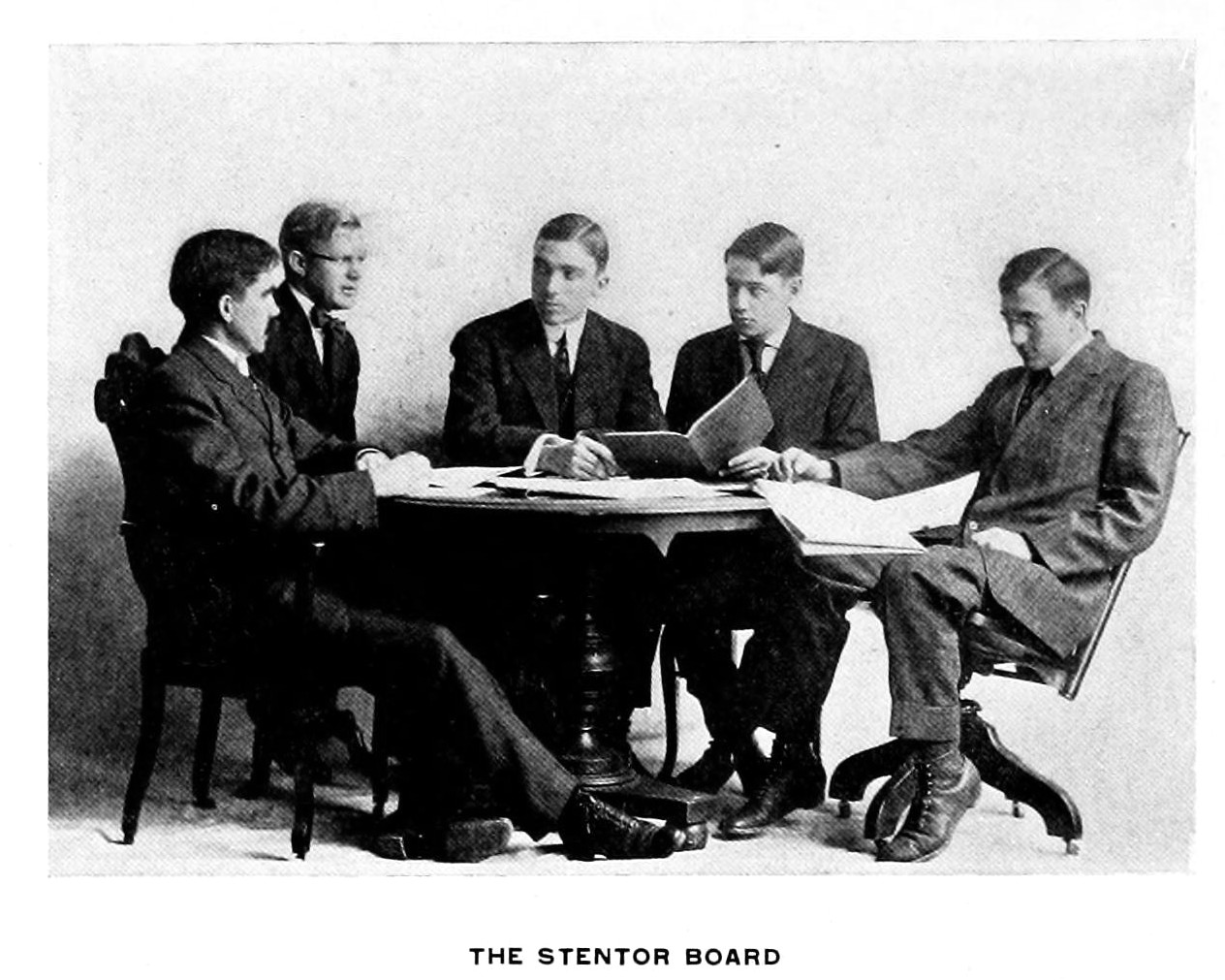
The Stentor Board pictured in the 1909 Forester yearbook

He tells how the two literary societies on campus at the time, the Athenean Society (founded 1876) and the Zeta Epsilon Society (founded 1880), had collaborated on the founding of The Stentor. The first Editor in Chief, J.J. Boggs, had belonged to the Athenean Society and had the unanimous support of his peers. Boggs later wrote a reminiscence in the 1909 Forester yearbook crediting encouragement and advice of Professor of Latin Language and Literature Francis W. Kelsey with the successful launch of the newspaper. By 1901, the paper's editorial staff had grown from six to sixteen. By 1909, The Stentor was being published weekly on Thursdays, after having been increased from monthly publication to every two weeks in 1890. In 1890, the newspaper's Editor was William E. Danforth, Class of 1891, who after graduating worked as a reporter for the Chicago Tribune. In June 1890 The Lake Forest University Stentor Publishing Company was officially incorporated by J.H. McVay, E.F. Dodge, and W.E. Danforth. In 1892, competitor campus paper Red and Black was issued, but it did not continue. Later in the 1890s, the newspaper was part of the Western Intercollegiate Press Association. In 1918 and 1919, during World War I, the editorial staff was entirely composed of women students, as the men had military obligations. In 1926, The Stentor was invited to and joined the Illinois College Press Association. Around 1925 the paper began conducting contests among the student body for various superlatives, including "most beautiful co-ed [and] most popular young man." Also in the 1920s, the paper sponsored a Stentor trophy to be awarded to fraternity athletic contest winners.

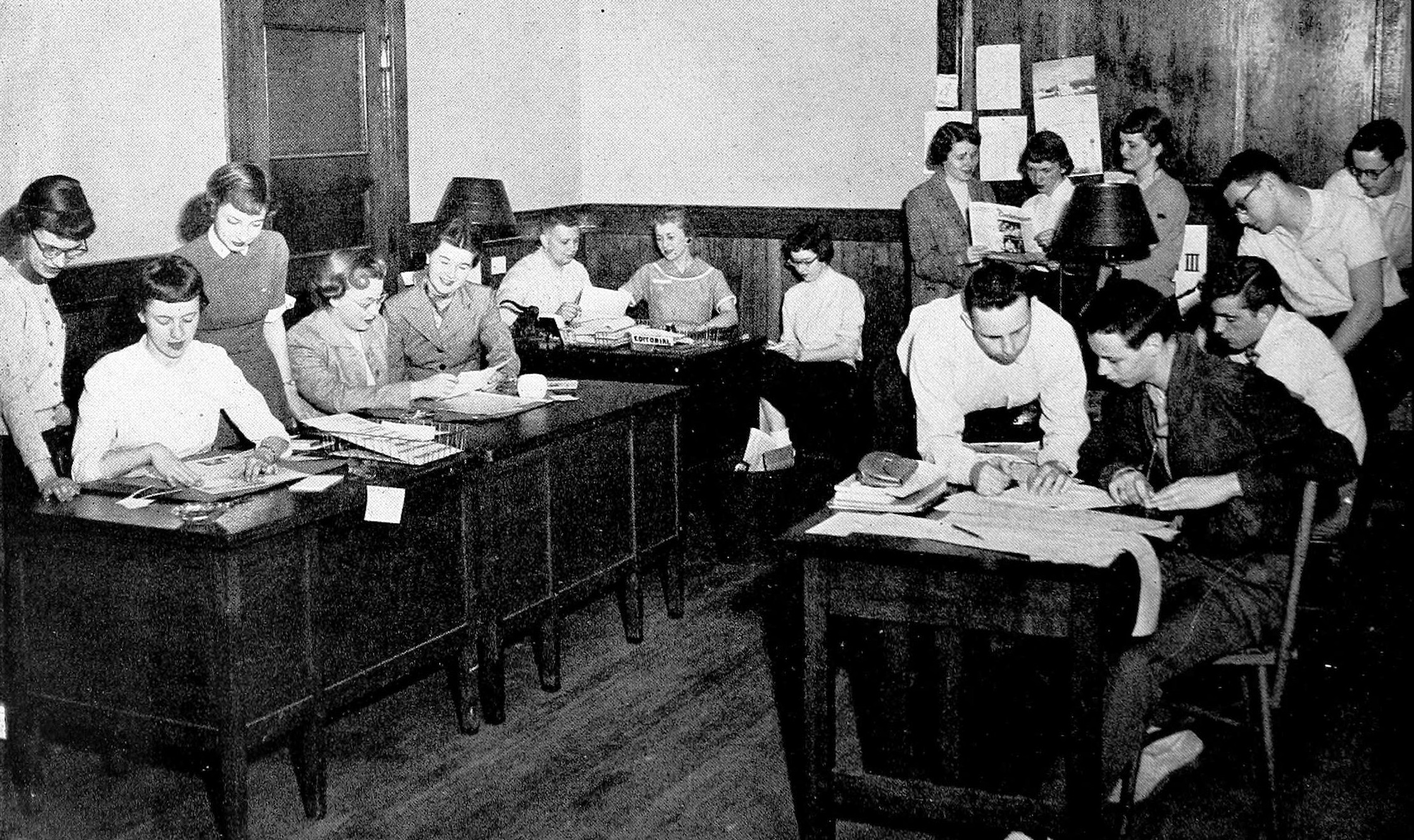
Office and staff of The Stentor, 1954

The student body would elect a Stentor board at the close of each academic year. In 1930, English Professors John A. Pollard and Edwin J. Schruers began offering a journalism class that included 'laboratory' work on The Stentor. The same year, an overarching Board of Publications was created at the College, and in 1931 a Faculty Committee on Publications was put in a supervisory role to the paper, with the responsibility of appointing Stentor staff. By 1936, journalism classes were no longer offered and so The Stentor sponsored a series of evening lectures from newspaper professionals. The same year, an official constitution was written establishing consistent staff positions. In 1937, the paper moved its printing from Highland Park to Lake Forest, where it was printed by Russell Heitman, publisher of the local newspaper The Lake Forester (established 1896, with closely-tied origins as the Stentor Supplement and later Stentor Press). In 1943, The Stentor was given a new office space in College Hall (now called Brown Hall). In 1948 they moved floors to share adjoining offices with The Forester yearbook staff, so the two could share equipment. By 1959, their office had moved to North Hall, and by 1987, to Stuart Commons.

During World War II, a page in The Stentor was reserved for "Communiques," a new section about Foresters in military service. A World News department was instituted in 1947. In 1952, Student Council began publishing their meeting minutes in the paper. A Stentor Editor from the Class of 1956, Sigvard Gissler, went on to work as News Editor for Libertyville's Independent Register, editorial writer for Milwaukee's Milwaukee Journal, and eventually taught journalism at Columbia University. In April 1960, the editorial staff of the paper resigned as only three students had taken on the unpaid roles; due to commitments to national advertisers, the paper's business manager and John Allen, Director of Information for Lake Forest College, took charge of continuing publication until a replacement editorial staff could be found. In the 1960s, "Great Teacher of 1968-1969" winner Dr. Forest Hansen, Philosophy Department Chair, was faculty advisor to The Stentor. In January 1965, a single edition of a rival student newspaper was published, called The Light. Its Editor in Chief John D. Baer, Class of 1966, wrote:

"It is with regret and disappointment that the editors of this paper feel compelled to abandon suggestions and attempts to compromise with the staff of The Stentor. Yet a loss of readers and a growing dissatisfaction with our only newspaper force many who are sincerely concerned with its future to resort to the publication of this one issue in order to portray our ideas of how the paper could be improved."

Baer elaborates that he and his twenty fellow Light staff wanted more "balanced" content, more "practical" criticisms, and more "responsible and accurate" reporting. Other than an anonymous letter to the editor in The Stentor's defense published in the February 5, 1965 edition of The Stentor, this newspaper coup was ignored by the elder publication. In Fall 1968, the Black student organization of Lake Forest College, Black Students for Black Action, launched an alternative newspaper Black Rap with dual purpose as a creative outlet; in their first Editor's Note, they wrote:

"[Black Rap] promotes the creativity of those Black students who have in the past desired to display their talents... but who were reluctant to submit articles to white-oriented publications."

Black Rap continued to be published through 1987, and was rebooted in 2020-2021.

The Stentor's Latin motto "Magna est veritas et praevalebit" was adopted in 1984, meaning "The truth is great and will prevail." The paper had begun to be produced with computers rather than typewriters around 1989. From January to March 1998, The Stentor ceased publication, but picked back up in April following resurrection efforts by the College Life Committee, Director of Campus Activities Jack Macy, and Stentor advisor Valerie Archambeau, Web Services Manager.

Throughout its history, The Stentor has functioned as both a news outlet and a training platform for student journalists, photographers, and editors. Staff roles include reporting, photography, layout design, and editorial work.

All issues of The Stentor are preserved in the College Archives, and digitized editions from 1887 to 1920 are accessible online via the Internet Archive. In Spring 2014, The Stentor transitioned to include an online presence with the launch of StentorNews.com.

== Awards ==
- In 1940 the Illinois College Press Association awarded The Stentor third place "Best Paper" in the division of "colleges with enrollments of 400 or less" and first place in the "Best Editorial" contest.
- In 1941 the Illinois College Press Association awarded The Stentor first place for "General Excellence" in the division of "weekly publications in schools enrolling fewer than 400 students."
- In 1949 the Associated Press awarded The Stentor a "First Class" rating.
- In 1992 The Stentor received a second-place national certificate from the Columbia Scholastic Press Association.
- In 2007 the Illinois College Press Association awarded The Stentor was awarded first place for Front-Page Layout, second place for Best News Story, second place in Sports Layout.

== See also ==
- List of student newspapers
- List of college and university student newspapers in the United States
