= Lake Forest Association =

Predecessor organization to Lake Forest University

The Lake Forest Association was a land purchasing organization that preceded the development of Lake Forest, Illinois and Lake Forest College.

== History ==
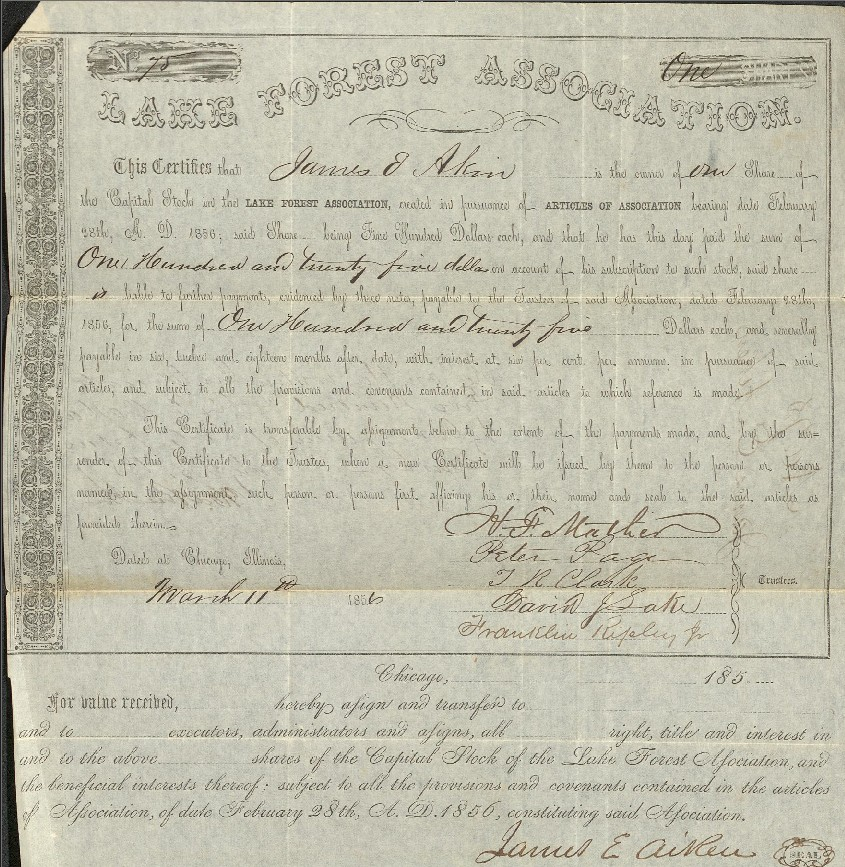
Stock Certificate for the Lake Forest Association, 1856

The Lake Forest Association was formed on February 26, 1856, during a meeting at the Second Presbyterian Church of Presbyterians from Chicago and Waukegan aiming to establish an "institution of learning of a high order in which Christian teaching would hold a central place." The Association's first president was lawyer and politician Hiram F. Mather. The Articles of Association specified they would be managed by a majority-elected board of five trustees (with each share counting for one vote). The first board of trustees consisted of Hiram F. Mather, Thomas P. Clark, Peter Page, Franklin Ripley Jr., and David J. Lake. Peter Page was the Association's authorized legal agent. The capital stock was capped between $50,000 and $60,000, to be divided into shares of $500 each.

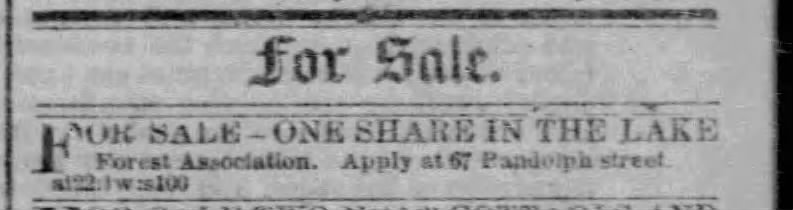
Lake Forest Association ad in the Chicago Tribune, 1857

In March 1856, the Association began selling shares, even taking out advertisements in the Chicago Tribune. The proceeds were used to buy tracts of land in what is now Lake Forest, Illinois, totaling about 2,300 acres. The plat of the town was recorded July 23, 1857 and registered in Waukegan. Land to the west of the Chicago & Milwaukee Railway was permanently set aside as Association property, and land to the east was divided into lots, half of which were reserved for shareholders, and the other half re-sold to the public. The proceeds of those sales were put toward endowing an institution of higher education, first called chartered as Lind University after benefactor Sylvester Lind, to be renamed Lake Forest University in 1865. 62 acres were set aside for the campus itself; the original Articles of Association had estimated 50, "thirty acres of which land so set apart shall be appropriated for college grounds; ten acres for building an academy and ten acres for female seminary." In April 1878 the Lake Forest Association was dissolved, and its assets reverted to the university.

== Legacy ==
Members of the Lake Forest Association went on to have key roles in the history of the town and schools of Lake Forest. Charter trustee David J. Lake went on to be the city's Police Magistrate, and authored the 1882 City Charter and Revised Ordinances of the City of Lake Forest. Association shareholder Sylvester Lind went on to be a four-time Mayor of Lake Forest. Association shareholder Shubael G. Spees was a Lind University trustee (1857-1861) and a founder of The Lake Forester newspaper (also published as Lake Forester and Lake Bluff news). Association shareholder Devillo R. Holt was a university trustee from 1857 to 1869, and the Lake Forest College's Lily Reid Holt Memorial Chapel was built in memory of his daughter-in-law. Association shareholder Charles B. Farwell was a university trustee for more than thirty years (1864-1896) and financed the co-ed reopening of a Collegiate Department in 1876. Association shareholder Robert W. Patterson was the university's founding president.
