= George Coles Stebbins =

American gospel songwriter

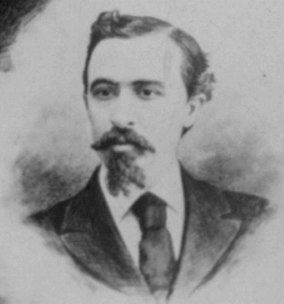
- Born: February 26, 1846
- Died: October 6, 1945 (aged 99)
- Occupation: Songwriter
- Years active: 1870-1945

George Coles Stebbins (1846–1945) was a gospel song writer. Stebbins was born February 26, 1846, in Orleans County, New York, where he spent the first 23 years of his life on a farm. In 1869 he moved to Chicago, Illinois, which marked the beginning of his musical career.

== Background ==
Stebbins became the musical director of Chicago's First Baptist Church in 1870, a position he held till the autumn of 1874, when he resigned to take up residence in Boston. During his residence in Chicago he became acquainted with Dwight L. Moody and Ira D. Sankey and also with Philip Paul Bliss and Major D. W. Whittle, both of whom early joined the great evangelistic movement inaugurated by Moody.

Shortly after his move to Boston, Stebbins became the musical director of the Clarendon Street Baptist Church where Adoniram Judson Gordon was minister. In January 1876 he became the musical director of Tremont Temple, alongside George O. Lorimer.

== Moody's direction ==
In the summer of that year Stebbins had occasion to spend a few days with Moody at his home in Northfield, Massachusetts, and during his visit Moody persuaded him to enter evangelistic work under Moody's direction, which Stebbins did that autumn. Stebbins' first work in this connection was to organize the choir for the meetings which Moody and Sankey were to hold in the great building erected for them in Chicago and which were to continue through October, November, and December. During the remainder of the season Stebbins assisted other evangelists, and in the summer following he became one of the editors of Gospel Hymns and subsequently of the series of hymnbooks used by Moody during the remainder of his life. Afterward Stebbins became the sole editor of Northfield Hymnal.

Stebbins married Elma Miller before commencing his musical career. When he began his evangelistic work, she became actively involved, assisting him most efficiently in his singing, besides conducting meetings and giving Bible readings for ladies.

During the nearly 25 years of his association with Moody, Stebbins assisted Moody and Sankey in their work both in this country and abroad besides working with other evangelists, among whom were George F. Pentecost and Major Whittle.

In the autumn of 1890, Stebbins, with his wife and son, went with Pentecost to India for a season of work among the English-speaking inhabitants of that country; and during their stay there Mr. and Mrs. Stebbins and their son gave services of song in several of the principal cities of the country. On their return home they gave services of song also in Egypt and Palestine and in Naples, Rome, Florence, Paris, and London.

From the beginning of Moody's work in Northfield, Stebbins has been one of the leaders of the singing at the summer conferences there and was the only one having official connection with the work at all general conferences for their first 30 years. He was also the last surviving member of the original group of men Moody had associated with him in his evangelistic work including Sankey, Whittle, Bliss, and James McGranahan.

== Gatherings ==
Regarding Stebbins' work, aside from his occupying important positions in churches and his leadership in the great movement with which he was connected for so many years, he was frequently engaged to lead the singing at international and state conventions of YMCA, Sunday schools, Christian Endeavor, and other religious gatherings. Among these gatherings were the two greatest of the Christian Endeavor conventions, one held in New York City's Madison Square Garden, at which there were 30 thousand delegates and one held in Boston when there were 50 thousand present. There was also the great Ecumenical Missionary conference held in Carnegie Hall and the 50th anniversary of the founding of the American YMCA, in Boston.

During these years his voice was not only heard in leading others, but it was also in constant demand in solo singing and on many occasions in singing with Sankey and others.

== Legacy ==
Stebbins was well equipped in the musical department of his work, as well as in the others, for he studied voice with some of the most celebrated teachers in the United States. Much as his voice was heard in different parts of the world, he is remembered foremost by the music which he composed, which has long survived him and demonstrated an appeal across time and cultural boundaries. Stebbins' lasting legacy, the hymns that have become gospel music classics. Among those are Jesus Is Calling, Jesus I Come, Have Thine Own Way, Lord, and Take Time to Be Holy.
