= M. E. Willson =

American singer

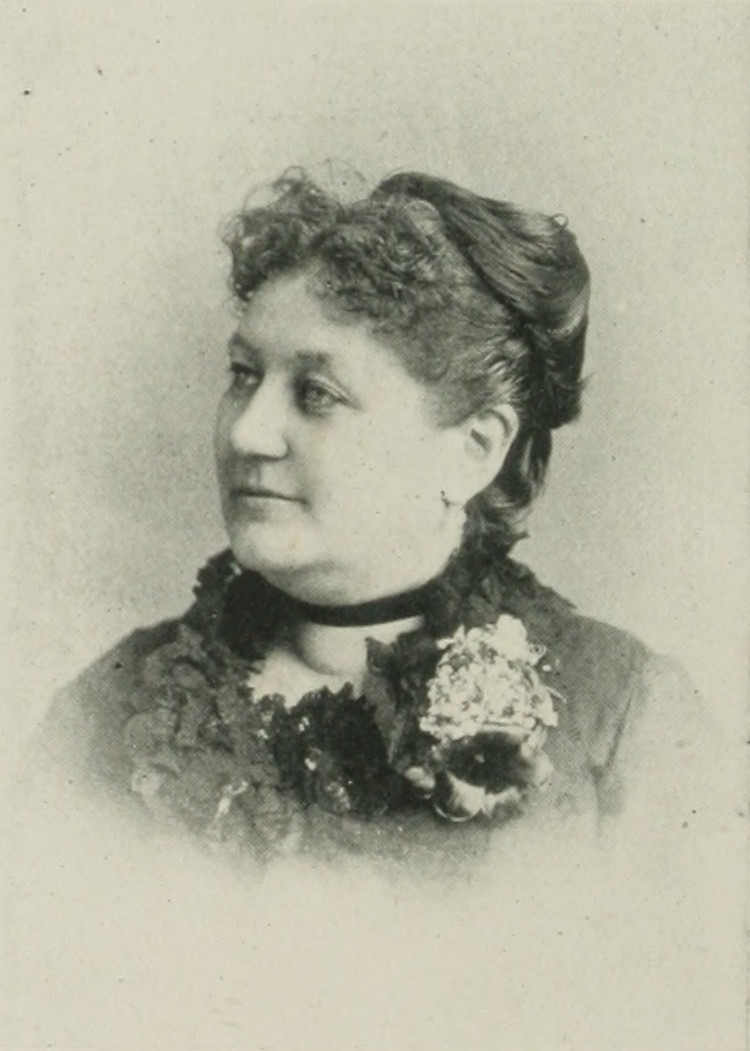
- Photo in A Woman of the Century
- Born: Mary Elizabeth Bliss; May 1, 1842; Penfield, Clearfield County, Pennsylvania, U.S.
- Died: 1906 (aged 63–64)
- Occupations: gGospel singer; lyricist; composer; evangelist
- Spouse: Clark Willson (m. 1860)
- Relatives: Philip Bliss (brother)
- Writing career
- Pen name: M. E. W.; M. E. B. W.; M. B. W.; Mate E. Willson
- Notable works: "Glad Tidings"; "My Mother's Hands"; "Papa, Come this Way"

M. E. Willson (née, Bliss; pseudonyms, M. E. W., M. E. B. W., M. B. W., Mate E. Willson; May 1, 1842 – 1906) was an American gospel singer, lyricist, composer, and evangelist from Pennsylvania. She performed widely across the U.S. and Great Britain, often appearing with her husband in evangelistic and temperance campaigns. Over the course of her career, she wrote hymns and sacred songs that were published in major gospel songbooks between 1881 and 1893, including well-known pieces such as “Glad Tidings,” “My Mother’s Hands,” and “Papa, Come this Way.” She also compiled two volumes of hymns, Great Joy and Sacred Gems, and was associated with leading figures in religious and temperance movements of her time. Her musical work followed early experiences teaching and participating in family singing traditions shared with her brother, the hymnwriter Philip Bliss.

== Early years and education ==
Mary Elizabeth Bliss was born in Penfield, Clearfield County, Pennsylvania, May 1, 1842. Her father, Mr. Bliss, was a principled man. Her mother, Lydia Bliss, was a Christian woman. Her only brother was the singer, evangelist, and hymnwriter, Philip Bliss. Of the two daughters in the family, Mary Elizabeth was the younger. While she was still a child, the family removed to Tioga County, Pennsylvania, where Mr. Bliss bought a tract of wild land and built a modest home in a forest of hemlock and maple trees. She had fond memories of roaming those old woods with her brother, both shouting and singing.

When she was fifteen years old, she accompanied her brother into the adjoining county of Bradford, where the latter taught a select school. They made their home with a family named Young, who were very musical. Miss Young gave Philip his first lessons in singing and eventually became his wife. Willson did not remember learning to read notes by sight; it seemed to her that she always knew them.

== Career ==
In 1858, Willson began teaching, and she taught until 1860, when she married Rev. Clark Willson, of Towanda, Pennsylvania, where they made their home. For the first sixteen years of their married, the Willsons spent considerable time in teaching music and holding musical conventions. After the death of her brother in the Ashtabula Bridge disaster, on December 29, 1876, the first great sorrow of her life fell on Willson. She then said: "I can never again sing merely to entertain people, but if the Lord will use my voice for the salvation of men, I will go on singing."

Very soon, a friend and co-worker of Philip, Major Daniel Webster Whittle, called the Willsons to aid him in evangelistic work in Chicago. They accepted the call, and their work as gospel singers was successful in Chicago and many other places. In 1878, Francis Murphy, the temperance evangelist, invited Mr. and Mrs. Willson to "sing the gospel" for him in what was known as the "Red Ribbon Crusade." They visited the principal cities of the Northern and Southern states, and everywhere, Mrs. Willson won the admiration and respect of all who heard her.

Thurlow Weed, in an article in the New-York Tribune named her the "Jenny Lind of sacred melody," a term that clung to her thereafter. In 1882, she and her husband spent several months in Great Britain, in the gospel temperance work, under the leadership of Francis Murphy. She sang to great audiences in Liverpool, Birmingham, Manchester, Edinburgh, Aberdeen, Glasgow, Dublin, and other cities. The British press was enthusiastic in praise.

She wrote several hymns and sacred songs that, like her brother's, were sung around the world. Among the most popular ones were "Glad Tidings," "My Mother's Hands" and "Papa, Come this Way". She was the author of two volumes of gospel hymns and songs, one entitled Great Joy and the other Sacred Gems. She contributed words and music to most of the gospel song-books published between 1881 and 1893.

== Personal life ==
She had four children, including Hila P., Hiram, and Fred. Willson died in 1906.

== Selected works ==
=== Books ===
- Great Joy
- Sacred Gems

=== Lyrics ===
- "A little childish voice is stilled"
- "Believe on the Lord, for he hath said"
- "Do you remember the dear old home"
- "Free salvation is flowing"
- "I'm fully saved through Jesus' blood"
- "I'm glad that the dear, loving Savior"
- "Jesus came down from His heavenly throne, Came just to rescue poor sinners alone"
- "Jesus stands at the door"
- "Joy, joy, joy, I will sing for the Savior has come"
- "Lost in our sins, mid deepest night"
- "O those beautiful, beautiful hands"
- "O the wondrous love that rescued"
- "The Savior called so lovingly"
- "The grace, all sufficient"
- "What of the future, my brother"

=== Compositions ===
- "A little childish voice is stilled"
- "Deep and grand in tones sublime"
- "Jesus is pleading with my poor soul"
- "O those beautiful, beautiful hands"
- "When, his salvation bringing"
