= Whittle =

Whittle may refer to:

== Crafts ==
- Whittling, the carving of wood with a knife

== People ==
- Whittle (name), a surname, and a list of people with the name

== Places ==
- Whittle, Kentucky
- Whittle, Derbyshire, a hamlet near Glossop, Derbyshire, United Kingdom
- Whittle-le-Woods, a village in Lancashire

== Companies ==
- Whittle Shortline US toy company
- Whittles, a bus company in England

== TV shows ==
- Whittle (game show) short-lived UK gameshow from 1997

== Aviation ==
- Gloster Whittle the first British jet aircraft
- Whittle Unit jet engine
- Whittle W1 jet engine
- Whittle W2 jet engine

== See also ==
- Justice Whittle (disambiguation)
