= Whittle (name) =

Whittle is an English surname. Notable people with the surname include:

- Alasdair Whittle, British archaeologist specialising in the Neolithic
- Albert Whittle (1877–1917), English cricketer
- Alex Whittle (born 1993), English footballer
- Bill Whittle (born 1959), American conservative
- Brian Whittle (born 1964), Scottish Conservative politician and former international athlete
- Chris Mary Francine Whittle (born 1927), Belgian composer
- Chris Whittle (born 1947), American entrepreneur who founded Channel One News and Edison Schools, Inc
- Daniel Webster Whittle (1840–1901), American gospel songwriter
- Francis McNeece Whittle (1823–1902), Episcopal bishop of Virginia
- Frank Whittle (1907–1996), British RAF officer who invented the jet engine
- Gwendolyn Yates Whittle (born 1961), sound editor
- Harry Whittle (1922–1990), British hurdler
- Jason Whittle (born 1975), American football player
- Jenny Whittle (born 1973), Australian basketball player
- John Woods Whittle (1882–1946), Australian soldier and recipient of the Victoria Cross
- Kennon C. Whittle (1891–1967), judge, Virginia Supreme Court of Appeals
- Lesley Whittle (1957–1975), English murder victim
- Madison Whittle, American politician
- Peter Whittle (mathematician) (1927–2021), New Zealand mathematician and statistician
- Peter Whittle (politician) (1961–2025), British politician, author, journalist and broadcaster
- Stafford G. Whittle (1849–1931), judge, Virginia Supreme Court of Appeals
- Stephen Whittle (born 1955), British transsexual activist
- Thomas Whittle the Elder (1803–1887), English watercolourist
- Tommy Whittle (1926–2013), British jazz saxophonist
