= George Junkin (disambiguation) =

George Junkin (1790–1868) was first president of Lafayette College, president of Miami University and Washington and Lee University.

George Junkin may also refer to:

- George C. Junkin, member of the Nebraska House of Representatives
- George G. Junkin (1839–1895), teacher, lawyer, and judge in Pennsylvania

== See also ==
- George McJunkin (1851–1922), African American cowboy, amateur archaeologist and historian in New Mexico
- George S. Junkins, mayor of Lawrence, Massachusetts
