= John M. Hart =

American politician

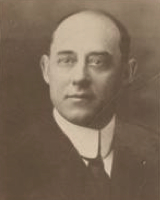

Member of the Virginia Senate from the 4th district
- In office January 8, 1908 – April 8, 1914
- Preceded by: Archer A. Phlegar
- Succeeded by: William L. Andrews

Personal details
- Born: John Marion Hart; January 2, 1866 Prince Edward, Virginia, U.S.
- Died: December 12, 1955 (aged 89) Roanoke, Virginia, U.S.
- Party: Democratic
- Spouse: Caroline Overton Harris
- Education: Hampden–Sydney College

John Marion Hart (January 2, 1866 – December 12, 1955) was an American Democratic politician who served as a member of the Virginia Senate, representing the state's 4th district. Hart resigned his seat in the Senate before the expiration of his second term in order to accept appointment as collector of internal revenue for the Western District of Virginia by President Woodrow Wilson.

Senate of Virginia
Preceded by Archer A. Phlegar	Virginia Senator for the 4th District; 1908–1915	Succeeded by William L. Andrews
