= Edward Lyle =

American politician (1871–1938)

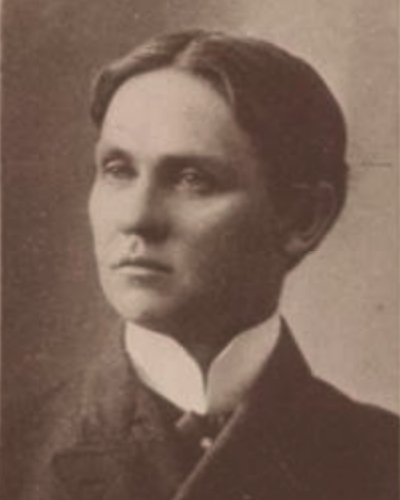

Member of the Virginia Senate from the 4th district
- In office December 6, 1899 – January 13, 1904
- Preceded by: M. H. Claytor
- Succeeded by: Archer A. Phlegar

Commonwealth's Attorney for Roanoke
- In office July 1, 1896 – December 6, 1899
- Preceded by: J. W. Hartwell
- Succeeded by: Everett Perkins

Personal details
- Born: June 19, 1871 Montgomery, Virginia, U.S.
- Died: January 19, 1938 (aged 66) Atlanta, Georgia, U.S.
- Party: Democratic
- Spouse: Fannie Mathews
- Education: Virginia Tech; Columbia University

Edward Lyle (June 19, 1871 – January 19, 1938) was an American attorney and politician who served as a member of the Virginia Senate. After his service in the Senate, he was, for approximately 30 years an officer of Southern Bell in Atlanta.

Senate of Virginia
Preceded by M. H. Claytor	Virginia Senator for the 4th District; 1899–1904	Succeeded by Archer A. Phlegar
