= Montgomery Female College =

School for girls in Virginia

Coordinates: 37°8′39.32″N 80°24′57.22″W

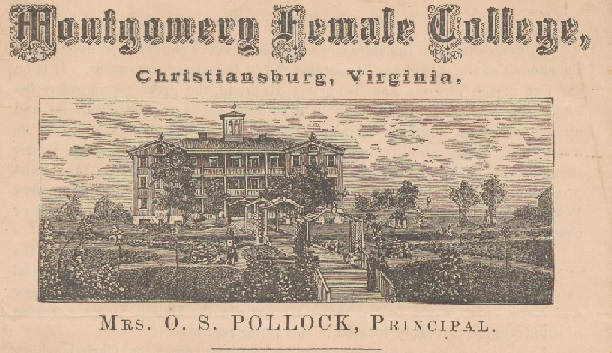
Illustration of Montgomery Female College, Virginia

Montgomery Female College was a school for girls in Virginia. Virginia Tech has a collection of papers related to the school. It was founded as Montgomery Collegiate Institute by the Montgomery Presbytery and was as a companion to Montgomery Male Academy. It opened on November 1, 1852.

Originally located in an old Presbyterian Church on Franklin Street, the school reopened in a new building in 1860. The school was used as a hospital during the American Civil War.

The school became Montgomery Female Academy and was eventually purchased by Samuel K. Knox in 1870. It struggled and was sold at public auction to Oceana S. Pollock, a teacher at the school, in 1876. She became its principal.

The school had a successful period and was deeded to Ebenezer T. Baird and his wife Anna Susan McDannold Baird in 1887. Pollock remained principal.

The school closed for a year in 1890 and reopened under a series of principals including Pollock's niece, Virginia Wardlaw, in 1903. Wardlaw's sisters joined her and were known for strange behavior and wearing black veils.

The school struggled financially and closed in 1908. The building became a boarding house and health resort and was then sold to the Montgomery County School Board. It was demolished in 1935 for the construction of Christiansburg High School. Virginia Tech has a collection of papers related to the school from 1875 until 1892.
