= Justice Whittle =

Justice Whittle may refer to:

- Kennon C. Whittle (1891–1967), associate justice of the Supreme Court of Virginia
- Stafford G. Whittle (1849–1931), associate justice of the Supreme Court of Virginia
