= Archer Allen Phlegar =

American judge (1846–1912)

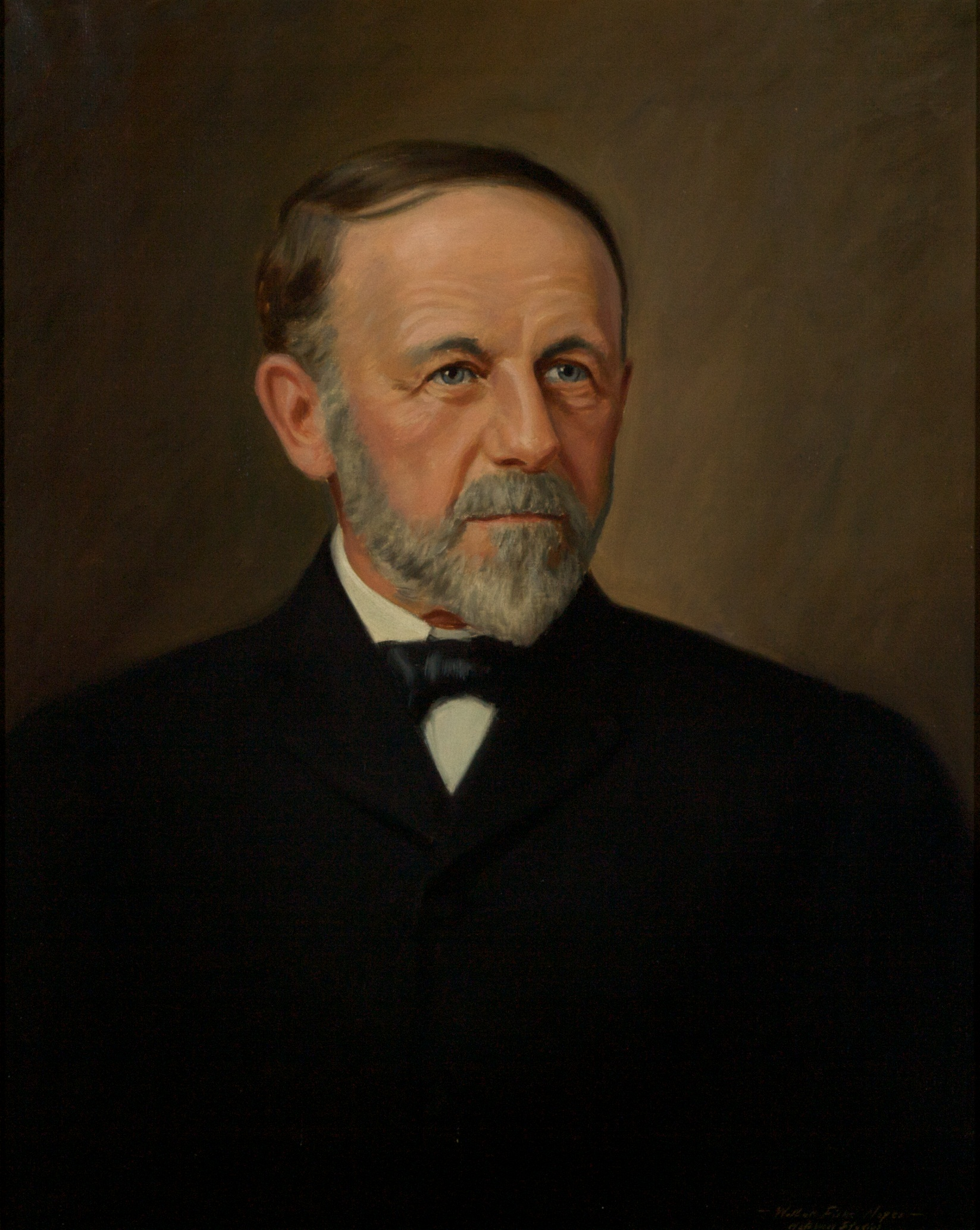

Member of the Virginia Senate from the 4th district
- In office January 13, 1904 – January 8, 1908
- Preceded by: Edward Lyle
- Succeeded by: John M. Hart

Justice of the Supreme Court of Virginia
- In office October 1, 1900 – February 22, 1901
- Preceded by: John W. Riely
- Succeeded by: Stafford G. Whittle

Personal details
- Born: Archer Allen Phlegar; February 22, 1846 Christiansburg, Virginia, U.S.
- Died: December 22, 1912 (aged 66) Bristol, Virginia, U.S.
- Party: Democratic
- Spouse: Susan Shanks
- Education: Washington College

Military service
- Allegiance: Confederate States
- Branch/service: Confederate States Army
- Years of service: 1862–1865
- Rank: Lieutenant
- Unit: 54th Virginia Infantry
- Battles/wars: American Civil War

Archer Allen Phlegar (February 22, 1846 – December 22, 1912) was a Virginian soldier, lawyer, judge and politician. After fighting in the American Civil War, Phlegar studied law before being elected to the Virginia State Senate and as a justice of the Supreme Court of Virginia (then named the Supreme Court of Appeals).

== Biography ==
Archer Phlegar was born at Christiansburg, Virginia to Ann and Eli Phlegar, the latter being a prominent local attorney. He attended Montgomery Male Academy in Montgomery County and spent one year at Washington College, before volunteering for the Confederate States Army in 1862 during the early American Civil War. Enlisted as a private, Phlegar rose to the rank of lieutenant in the army.

When the war ended, Phlegar worked on the family farm and business, while also studying law. He was admitted to the bar in 1869 and appointed Commonwealth's Attorney for Montgomery County in 1870. Phlegar was reelected and served in that position for seven years, before winning election to the Virginia State Senate in 1877 as a Democrat.

Governor James Hoge Tyler appointed Phlegar as a justice of the Supreme Court of Appeals in October 1900, to serve the remaining term of the recently deceased John W. Riely. Phlegar's term on the Court was brief, as he served only until February 22, 1901, before the Virginia legislature replaced him with Stafford G. Whittle. Phlegar returned to the private practice of law, until he was again elected to the Virginia State Senate in 1903. Phlegar served this term in the Senate from 1904 to 1908, while also acting as president of the Virginia Bar Association from 1905 to 1906. He returned to private practice in Bristol, where he was counsel for several coal and railroad companies.

Archer Phlegar died in Bristol on December 22, 1912, and was survived by his widow, Susan Shanks, and four children. Two other children of the marriage predeceased him.

Legal offices
Preceded by John W. Riely	Justice of the Supreme Court of Virginia; 1900–1901	Succeeded by Stafford G. Whittle
Senate of Virginia
Preceded by None	Virginia Senator for the 4th District; 1904–1908	Succeeded by John M. Hart
