= Montgomery Male Academy =

Montgomery Male Academy was a school in Christiansburg, Virginia. Montgomery Collegiate Institute, a school for girls, was opened as a companion school and became Montgomery Female Academy.

Judge Archer A. Phlegar went to the school. Robert Henry Logan also went to the school. George G. Junkin taught at Montgomery Male Academy.
