= Robert Henry Logan =

American soldier (1839–1900)

Robert Henry Logan (July 10, 1839 – December 26, 1900) was an American soldier and politician. A Confederate Army colonel during the American Civil War, he went on to be mayor of Salem, Virginia, Salem's attorney, and a member of the Virginia Legislature.

== Biography ==
Logan was born in Salem, the son of Joseph Addison Logan and his wife Elsie, the daughter of Henry A. Edmundson. He was descended from James Logan, who had been a colonel during the American War of Independence. The family also claimed descent from a Scottish "Lord Logan". He was educated at the Montgomery Male Academy and later at Roanoke College, moving on to the United States Military Academy in 1857.

After distinguished service with the 42nd Virginia Infantry under General John B. Floyd and later with the 27th Virginia Cavalry, Logan served as a staff officer to General Gabriel C. Wharton. Having risen to a high command in the 45th Virginia Infantry by the end of the war, he returned to Salem, where in 1867 he was admitted to the bar. In 1871 he married Anna Clayton Logan, a second cousin, and they had five children. He was Mayor of Salem on two occasions and was the town's attorney for twenty years. He died in Salem, aged 61.
