= James McGranahan =

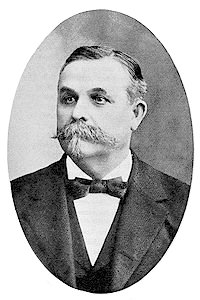

James McGranahan (July 4, 1840 - 9 July 9, 1907) was a nineteenth-century American musician and composer, known mostly for his hymns and gospel songs. A good friend of Philip P. Bliss, he was also associated with other well-known gospel songwriters such as William B. Bradbury, George F. Root, and Daniel W. Whittle; he eventually replaced Bliss as Whittle's song leader in full-time evangelistic ministry after Bliss' tragic death in the Ashtabula River Railroad Disaster.

== Biography ==
=== Early life and education ===
James McGranahan was born on July 4, 1840, in the tiny village of Adamsville, Pennsylvania. Raised on a farm, the ninth of twelve children, he was of Scotch-Irish descent. His grandfather had emigrated to the American colonies from Belfast, Ireland, just before the Revolutionary War, and enlisted and served in the Continental Army. Showing some musical talent at an early age, he wanted to study music, but his father discouraged him, as he felt that his son was needed more on the farm. Nevertheless, at the age of 17, James found someone who could take his place on the farm, and began studying music. There he not only earned enough money to pay for his substitute, but for music lessons for himself as well.

In 1860, when he was 19 years old, James enrolled at William Bradbury’s Normal Academy of Music in Geneseo, New York, the same school (and year) that Philip P. Bliss attended. He studied under T. E. Perkins, Carlo Bassini, and others; he also met a young woman named Addie Vickery, who would go on to become his wife (in 1863), accompanist, and partner in all of his future endeavors. Around the same time, he met J. G. Towner of Rome, Pennsylvania, a vocal teacher who was also tutoring Bliss; in 1862 he asked McGranahan to come and work with him, so for two years they held music conventions and gave concerts in both Pennsylvania and New York. When not doing so, he served as the local postmaster while working as a clerk in the country store.

=== Career ===
McGranahan's reputation began to spread, so much so that in 1875 he was asked by George F. Root to take over the management of the National Normal Institute in Chicago, where he went on to serve for three years as director and teacher; during that same time, some of his teachers began urging him to consider the operatic stage. McGranahan struggled to make a decision until Daniel W. Whittle approached him after the loss of Philip P. Bliss, and asked McGranahan to replace Bliss as his right-hand man in evangelism. Bliss had previously mentioned to Whittle that he was trying to find an evangelist with whom his friend McGranahan could work; at the time, the Major had assured him that God would provide someone, but he now saw himself to be that man. When the two met in Ashtabula, Ohio, both looking for the remains and belongings of the Blisses following the Ashtabula River Railroad Disaster, Whittle told him he believed that God had ordained for them to meet there for that reason. Within a month, McGranahan accepted Whittle's offer.

For eleven years, Whittle and McGranahan led evangelistic campaigns together across the United States, while also making two trips overseas to Great Britain and Ireland, first by themselves in 1880, then in 1883 in association with Dwight L. Moody and Ira D. Sankey.

One of the first gospel melodies that McGranahan composed was for “I Will Sing of My Redeemer”; the lyrics had been penned by Philip P. Bliss shortly before he died at Ashtabula.

Not only did Whittle and McGranahan team up together in evangelism, but they also did in songwriting; in fact, some of the songs that remain most popular today were the work of Whittle on the words and McGranahan on the music. (Examples include “Christ Liveth in Me”, “I Know Whom I Have Believed”, “The Banner of the Cross”, and “There Shall Be Showers of Blessing”.) In total, according to the Cyber Hymnal, McGranahan wrote 123 melodies for gospel songs, as well as the words for ten. He also pioneered the use of male choirs in gospel singing, when he found himself with an all-male choir at a meeting in Worcester, Massachusetts; he quickly adapted the music he had to fit male voices, then later on published Gospel Male Choir Numbers 1 and 2 and Male Choir and Quartet.

One of McGranahan’s earlier songs has an interesting connection to the state of Hawaii: He composed a tune accompanying a poem written by an unknown author, Ellen H. Willis, titled “I Left It All with Jesus”; both words and music were published in 1871. But some 40 years before that, Lorenzo Lyons (aka “Makua Laiana” for “Father Lyons”), a Congregational minister from Massachusetts, went to Hawaii as a missionary, where he served as the pastor of Imiola Church in Waimea on the island of Hawaii for 53 years; during his ministry he founded at least 14 churches, while serving as the district postmaster. Lyons took McGranahan's melody and gave it different lyrics and a new title, “Hawaii Aloha”; it has since become one of Hawaii’s best known and most loved songs, often sung at the end of political, religious, educational, and sporting events. In 1967, the Hawaii State Legislature considered making "Aloha Hawaii" the official state song, but "Hawaii Pono'i" was chosen instead. It was inducted into the Hawaiian Music Hall of Fame in 1998.

=== Death ===
After a little more than a decade of working alongside Whittle, McGranahan's health took a turn for the worse, forcing him to give up his evangelistic work. Since close friends lived in Kinsman, Ohio, he built a home there, where for 20 years diabetes took a steady toll on his life, until on July 9, 1907 (interestingly enough, Philip P. Bliss' birthday), he passed away. His funeral took place three days later; a memorial service was held for him a month later, at which Daniel B. Towner sang his song “Christ Returneth”.
