= George G. Junkin =

American lawyer

George Garnett Junkin (November 19, 1839 – February 22, 1895) was a teacher, member of the Confederate Army, lawyer, county superintendent of schools, judge of the County Court, and Commonswealth's attorney.

== Personal life ==
Junkin was born in Milton, Pennsylvania. His father was Rev. David Xavier Junkin, D. D., a renowned minister. Junkin was a nephew of Rev. George Junkin, D. D., who became president of Washington College (predecessor of Washington and Lee University).

Ganett graduated from Washington College in Virginia in 1859. He came to Christiansburg as an assistant to Captain W. C. Hagan and taught at Montgomery Male Academy Christiansburg, Virginia.

On November 5, 1862, he married Betty Montague November 5, 1862. Her father was R. D. Montague, Esq., who clerked for the circuit and county courts in the area. They had 12 children.

A Presbyterian, he was a church deacon and member of the board of trustees of Washington & Lee University.

== Military career ==
He enlisted as a private in the so-called "Fensibles," which went to the front from Montgomery County under Stonewall Jackson's command. He served in the Fourth Virginia Infantry during the American Civil War. Junkin was Gen. Jackson's staff and served as staff Officer until he was captured at Kernstown. After his return to the Confederate Army, he was appointed to the command of Company E, 25th Virginia Infantry.

After receiving pleas from his father that his mother was in a bad way and needed her son, he pledged an oath of loyalty to the Union. But after discovering he was deceived and that she was in good health, he returned to the Confederacy and joined a cavalry regiment. He was the last Confederate soldier injured in Virginia. He was one of four Confederate soldiers injured in an attack on Union soldiers near Christiansburg 3 days after General Lee's surrender at Appomattox. The skirmish is known as the Battle of Seven Mile Tree. Two member of a cavalry regiment from Michigan were killed.

He is buried at Sunset cemetery in Christiansburg.
