= Daniel Webster Whittle =

American gospel lyricist and evangelist

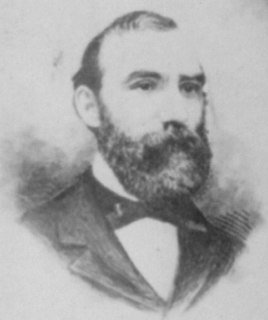
- Born: November 22, 1840
- Died: March 4, 1901 (aged 60)
- Military career
- Allegiance: United States
- Branch: U.S. Army
- Service years: 1861–1865
- Rank: Major
- Unit: 72d Illinois Infantry
- Conflicts: American Civil War

Daniel Webster Whittle (November 22, 1840 – March 4, 1901) was a 19th-century American evangelist and gospel song writer; encouraged to go into full-time evangelism by Dwight L. Moody, his two song leaders, Philip P. Bliss and James McGranahan, were also gospel song writers in their own respect.

== His Life ==
Named after the famed lawyer and statesman, Daniel Webster, whom his father admired, Daniel Webster Whittle was born on November 22, 1840, in Chicopee Falls, Massachusetts, in the southwestern corner of the state.

Not much is known of his childhood, outside of the fact that his mother was a "sweet and lovely" Christian; by the time he had become a young adult, he, along with his three brothers (and many others like them), had made their way "out west" to Chicago to seek fame and fortune. Whittle came to Christ during his service in the Civil War, when he was wounded in battle and had to have his arm amputated above the elbow. While recuperating, he was rooting around in his haversack when he found a New Testament that had been placed there by his godly mother; he read right through it, finding that he could understand it in a way that he never had before. Still, he had yet to yield to Christ as Savior and Lord, until a nurse asked him to speak to a young man in the other end of the ward who was dying and wanted someone to pray for him. Reluctantly, he agreed, recounting the event:

"Oh, pray for me! Pray for me! I am dying," the mortally wounded soldier pleaded. "I was a good boy at home in Maine. My mother and father are members of the Church, and I went to Sunday School and tried to be a good boy. But since I became a soldier, I have learned to be wicked. I drank, and swore, and gambled, and went with bad men. And now I am dying, and I am not fit to die! Oh, ask God to forgive me! Pray for me. Ask Christ to save me!" As he stood there, Whittle recalled, "God said to my soul by His Spirit, just as plainly as if He had spoken in audible tones, ‘You know the way of salvation. Get right down on your knees and accept Christ and pray for this boy.’ I dropped upon my knees and held the boy's hand in mine, as in a few broken words I confessed my sins, and asked God for Christ's sake to forgive me. . . I then prayed earnestly for the boy. He became quiet and pressed my hand as I pleaded the promises. When I arose from my knees, he was dead. A look of peace was upon his face, and I can but believe that God, who used him to bring me to my Savior, used me to get his attention fixed upon Christ and to lead him to trust in His precious blood. I hope to meet him in Heaven.

While in Chicago, Whittle first went to work for Wells, Fargo, and Co., working his way up from night watchman to cashier; while employed there he dedicated himself to serving the Lord with his life. "I went into the vault (one night) and in the dead silence of that quietest of places I gave my life to my Heavenly Father to use as He would," he explained later. At the same time, he got involved at the Tabernacle Sunday School, the largest in the city, where, in the course of time, he became its superintendent; there he also met Abbie Hanson, a New Englander by birth like himself, who would later become his wife. In 1861 he joined the 72nd Illinois Infantry, enlisting as a second lieutenant in Company B, but was not deployed until the following year; on August 22, the night before he and his fellow soldiers left to head south, he married Miss Hanson, only to be parted for over a year.

Whittle served valiantly during the war: he was appointed Provost Marshal on General O. O. Howard’s staff and accompanied General William Tecumseh Sherman on his “march to the sea”. It was while he was at Vicksburg, Mississippi, that he was sorely wounded: while leading a charge in place of his wounded captain, he was shot in his sword arm, resulting in the loss of his limb above the elbow. At the close of the war, he was breveted “major”, a name that he was referred to for the rest of his life.

== His Career in Evangelism ==
Back in Chicago after a time of recuperation, he found a job at the Elgin Watch Company, working his way up to treasurer, a position which he held up until the time that he entered full-time evangelistic work with Philip P. Bliss in 1873. That decision was due to the influence of D. L. Moody, whom he had met for the first time when he returned to the Windy City. He had attended a big meeting at Moody's Tabernacle, still weak from the loss of blood and with his arm in a sling, when he was asked to say a few words to the crowd. Unsure of himself and slow to get up, suddenly a voice called out, “Give him three cheers, boys!” It was none other than D. L. Moody himself, leading the audience in a rousing patriotic tribute to a wounded soldier. From that moment on, they were fast friends.

Moody was instrumental in influencing both Whittle and Bliss to join forces in evangelistic work, with Whittle preaching the gospel while Bliss sang it. Their collaboration ended on December 29, 1876, when Philip and his wife were killed in the tragic Ashtabula Railroad Disaster, upon which James McGranahan became his replacement. The two made several trips to Great Britain, as well as extensive tours of the United States, a working relationship that ended in 1890 when McGranahan’s health began to fail and George O. Stebbins took his place.

As to the contrast of Moody’s and Whittle’s preaching styles, the former was described as having a “more vivid imagination”, while the latter was more “subtly analytical”; Moody had greater power over an audience, but Whittle was more irresistible in his debating skills. One contemporary put it this way: “Mr. Moody preaches more like the Apostle John, Mr. Whittle more like the Apostle Paul.”

On the other hand, the “Major” loved children and had a remarkable ability of presenting the gospel in such a way that he made it attractive to and easily understood by them. In fact, he would hold special services just for them, in which he would use a blackboard and scientific experiments to illustrate the truths he was teaching. His object lessons were so popular that they were eventually incorporated into a book.

== His Death ==
The last evangelistic effort that Whittle devoted himself to was during the Spanish-American War of 1898. Having been a soldier himself, he had a particular affinity for his fellows-in-arms, to the point that he ate with them, slept as they did, and lived among them. But it took its toll on his health, sending him back to his home in Northfield, Massachusetts, where he had retired; for three years his strength gradually failed, leaving him confined to bed for the last year of his life.

His last words, dictated a few weeks before his death as he lay sleeplessly in intense pain, were never set to music. As the little clock by his bedside chimed, it reminded him of the bells on the hem of the high priest’s robe in the Old Testament:

Swift, with melodious feet, the midnight hours pass by;

As with each passing bell so sweet, I think, “My Lord draws nigh.”

I see Heaven's open door, I hear God's gracious voice;

I see the blood-washed ‘round the throne, and with them I rejoice.

It may be that these sounds are the golden bells so sweet

Which tell me of the near approach of the Heavenly High Priest’s feet.

Not every night is thus; some nights with pain are drear.

Then I join my moan with creation's groan and the chimes I do not hear.

But the Lord remains the same; faithful He must abide;

And on His word my soul I'll rest, for He is by my side.

Some midnight sleepless saints, made quick by pain to hear,

Shall join the glad and welcome cry, “The Bridegroom draweth near.”

“Then I shall see His face, His beauteous image bear;

I’ll know His love and wondrous grace, and in His glory share.

So, sing my soul in praise, as bells chime o’er and o’er,

The coming of the Lord draws near, when time shall be no more.

“Major” Daniel Webster Whittle died on March 4, 1901, at his daughter’s home in Northfield, Massachusetts; on his tomb are engraved the words of Hebrews 11:27 – “He endured as seeing Him who is invisible.”

== His Song Writing ==
Whittle had this to say of the gospel songs that he wrote, “I hope that I will never write a hymn that does not contain a message – there are too many hymns that are just a meaningless jingle of words; to do good, a hymn must be founded on God’s Word and carry the message of God’s love.” In D. L. Moody’s opinion, Whittle’s songs were “some of the best hymns of this century.”

"Christ Is All" was the first gospel song that he wrote. He gave the words to Philip P. Bliss to set to music, who was unable to do so before he perished in the Ashtabula Railroad Disaster on December 29, 1876; they were found among Bliss’ papers after his death, leaving it to James McGranahan to compose a melody for it. Not one for publicity, Whittle wrote much of his earlier music under the pseudonym “El Nathan” (Hebrew for “God’s gift”); in fact, the melody for one of his most popular songs, “I Know Whom I Have Believed” goes by that title. McGranahan contributed the tunes for some of Whittle’s better-known songs, such as “Christ Liveth in Me”, “The Banner of the Cross”, and “There Shall Be Showers of Blessing”, while his daughter, May (b. 1870), who married D. L. Moody’s son, William, wrote the music for “Moment by Moment”.

== Writings ==
- Memoirs of Philip P. Bliss edited by D.W. Whittle. Chicago: A. S. Barnes and Company, 1877. B00085OH8S
- Jonathan and other poems. BiblioBazaar, 2009 September. Old Tappan, New Jersey: Fleming H. Revell company, 1900. ISBN 978-1-103-39065-6
- The Wonders of Prayer. BiblioBazaar, 2009 February 10. ISBN 978-1-103-39065-6.
