= Stafford G. Whittle =

American judge

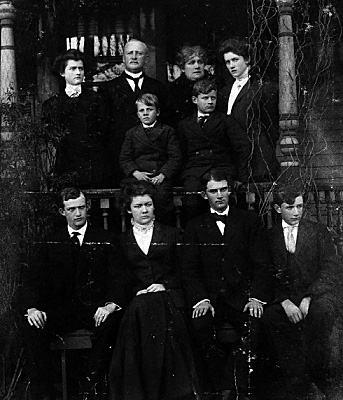
- Photograph of the Whittle family. Stafford Whittle is second to the left on the top row

Justice of the Supreme Court of Virginia
- In office March 1901 – December 31, 1919
- Preceded by: Archer A. Phlegar
- Succeeded by: Edward W. Saunders

Personal details
- Born: Stafford Gorman Whittle; December 5, 1849 Mecklenburg County, Virginia, U.S.
- Died: September 11, 1931 (aged 81) Martinsville, Virginia, U.S.
- Education: Washington and Lee University; University of Virginia

Stafford Gorman Whittle (December 5, 1849 – September 11, 1931) was born at the family home Woodstock in Mecklenburg County, Virginia. His early education was received in Norfolk but, when the American Civil War began, he continued his studies with a tutor at his father's home in Botetourt County. Later, he attended Chatham Male Institute in Pittsylvania County and entered Washington College when he was eighteen. The following year, 1868, he studied law at the University of Virginia. In 1871, he was admitted to the bar and began practice in Martinsville, Virginia. Ten years later, February 1, 1881, he was appointed judge of the Fourth Judicial Circuit. He served there until March 1882, when he was defeated by the Readjuster Party. In 1885, however, he was elected for the full term and served until he was elected to the Supreme Court of Appeals in 1901. He became president of the court in 1917 and continued so until 1919 when he resigned. Returning to Martinsville, where Whittle had a long association with Christ Episcopal Church, Stafford Gorman Whittle spent the remaining years with his family. `

== See also ==
- Kennon C. Whittle
