= Philip Bliss =

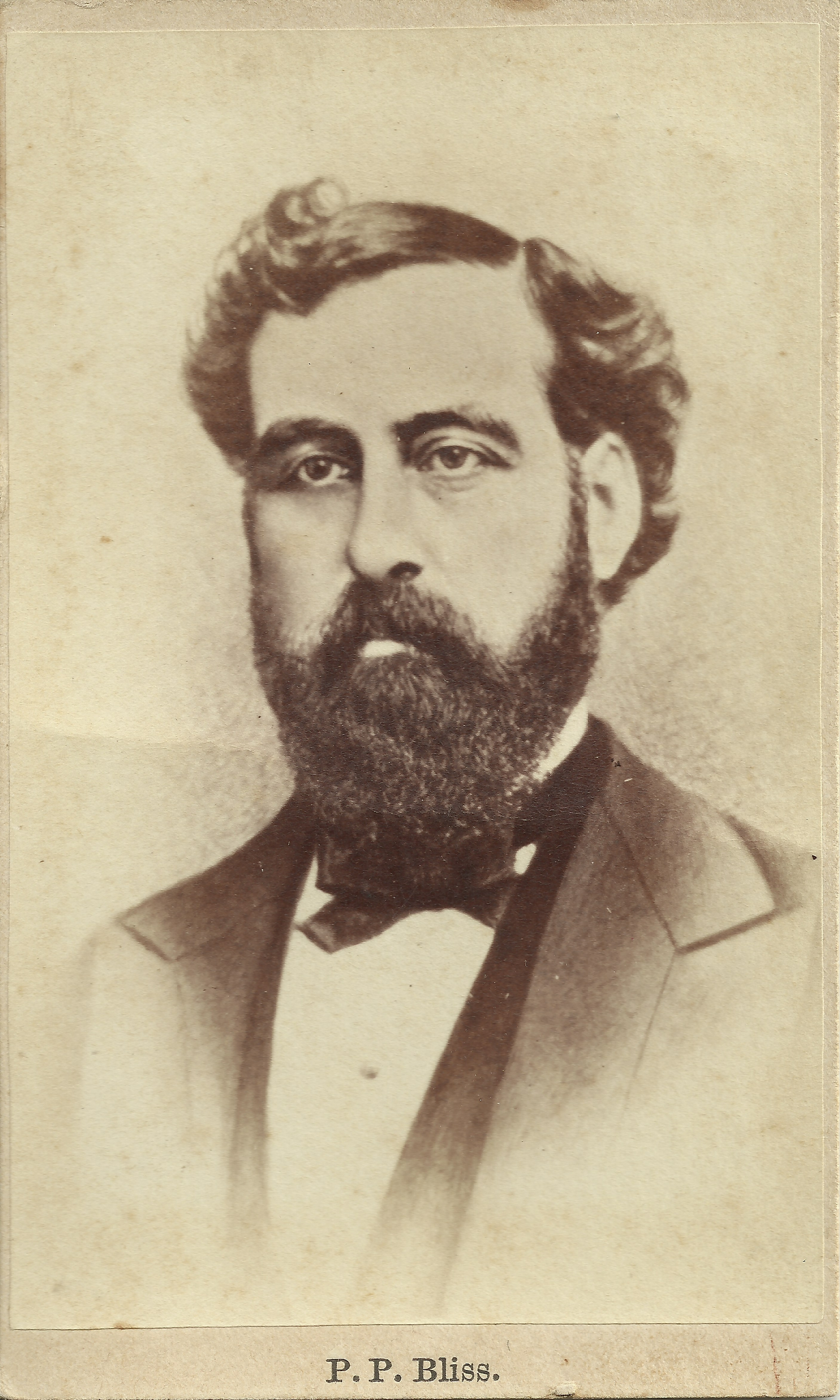
Philip Paul Bliss

Philip Paul Bliss (July 9, 1838 – December 29, 1876) was an American composer of gospel songs, baritone-bass singer, and song leader who collaborated with Daniel W. Whittle in evangelistic ministry; he was also a good friend of Dwight L. Moody. Some of his better-known songs are "Hold the Fort" (1870), "Almost Persuaded" (1871); "Let the Lower Lights Be Burning" (1871); "Hallelujah, What a Saviour!" (1875); "Wonderful Words of Life" (1875), and "I Will Sing of My Redeemer" (1876); he also wrote the melody for Horatio Spafford's "It Is Well with My Soul" (1876).

With a surname derived from a Middle English word meaning "joy" or "gladness, those who knew him well, like George F. Root, a close friend and one-time employer, would say of him, "His smile went into his religion and his religion into his smile", while Arthur T. Pierson, successor to Charles H. Spurgeon at the Metropolitan Tabernacle of London, testified that "he was well named 'Bliss'. What a happy man he was! What a ray of sunshine, what a spring of joy!"

== Family heritage ==
Found among his papers after his death, on a page marked "P. P. Bliss, 1861", was his family's genealogy, with some very interesting religious and historical connections. Thomas Bliss Sr., his great-great-great-great-great-grandfather, was a hard-working, wealthy landowner from the village of Belstone in the West Devon District of England; because of his Puritan convictions, all of his real estate holdings were confiscated and he was thrown in jail during the persecution of Dissenters (or Nonconformists) under the auspices of William Laud, Archbishop of Canterbury. His health and wealth ruined, he died there two years later in 1635.

The same year that Thomas Sr., died, his widow and two of their sons, George and Thomas Jr., set sail from Wales for the New World in search of religious freedom. Thomas Jr., settled down in Connecticut, where he was the first person to introduce potatoes to the region; George chose Rhode Island. George's son, John, then moved to Connecticut, where he met and married Damaris Arnold, the daughter of the then-governor of Rhode Island, Benedict Arnold I, the great-grandfather of the notorious traitor. Next in line was Josiah Bliss, who fathered a son, William, who in turn was the father of Philip's grandfather, John (b. 1760); a shoemaker by trade, he married a woman from Massachusetts named Reliance Babcock, then moved his family to Greenfield in Saratoga County, New York, where he bought a 100-acre farm. As to John's religious character, he walked from his home in Greenfield to Newport, Rhode Island, a distance of 200 miles, just to be baptized (no doubt, in a cold, icy creek!); later, he became a Seventh Day Baptist minister.

Philip's grandmother gave birth to sixteen children, twelve of whom were boys, but only two of them survived into adulthood, one of whom was one of a set of twins, Isaac, who was born on April 29, 1797. He married Lydia Doolittle on June 17, 1831, and together they had five children: Phebe, Reliance (named after her paternal grandmother), Philip, Elizabeth, and James. Reliance died when she was three years old, while James only lived to be seven months old and was buried next to his sister.

The only book that Isaac Bliss ever read was the Bible. Philip said of his father, “He was a diligent reader of the Bible, and had the most implicit faith in its teachings, and a deep reverence for its commands.” He also admired his father's prayer life as “devout, tender, and child-like, repeating over and over again, year after year, about the same words, until we all knew them by heart; his prayers were very real, very holy to me in my childhood". Philip described his father as living “in continual communion with his Savior; always happy, always trusting, always singing.” As to the latter, Philip's mother, Lydia, used to lovingly poke fun of her husband, because all the hymns that he sang began with the word “come”; in fact, two of his favorites were “Come, Ye Sinners, Poor and Needy” and “Come, We That Love the Lord”. In honor of his godly upbringing, Philip wrote a song called "My Grandfather's Bible" (which can be sung to FRIEND, the melody for "I've Found a Friend", written by George C. Stebbins), the first verse of which went like this:

The Sabbath day - sweet day of rest - was drawing to a close;

The summer day went murm'ring by, to lull me to repose:

I took my father's Bible down - his father's gift to him -

A treasure rare, beyond compare, though soiled the page and dim.

== Early life ==
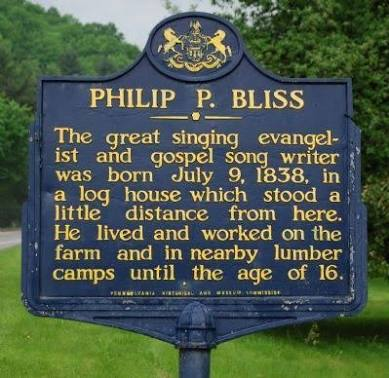

Philip P. Bliss was born in Huston Township, near Penfield in the northwestern corner of Clearfield County, almost at the heart of the state of Pennsylvania. There is a historical marker on Pennsylvania Route 255, 2.2 miles northeast of Pennfield in the village of Hollywood, indicating where his birthplace may have once been. It reads, “Philip P. Bliss: The great singing evangelist and gospel song writer was born July 9, 1838, in a log house which stood a little distance from here. He lived and worked on the farm and in nearby lumber camps until the age of 16.” As Philip tells the story, his original first name was spelled with two “P”s at the end; he then took the final “P” and made it his middle initial. Since he referred to himself as “Sr.” and his oldest son, who was known as “Paul”, as “Jr.”, it stands to reason that his middle initial stood for “Paul”.

Philip's family moved frequently in his younger years: after five years in Clearfield County, they moved to Kinsman, Ohio, just across that state line (Kinsman is where his good friend James McGranahan eventually retired and was buried), then returned to Pennsylvania, where they lived in Espyville (Crawford County) for a year, before eventually settling down in Tioga County in the north-central part of the state. Because his family moved so often and lived where there were very few people, Philip had little in the way of formal schooling, getting much of what he learned from his father's singing, praying, and reading of the Scriptures, along with his mother's daily lessons.

From an early age, Philip had a keen interest in music; at first, he would sit and listen to his father sing, eventually joining in along with him as he got older. Picking up a tune came easy for him; he could whistle it or play it on a crude musical instrument that he himself made. But it was when he was ten years old, while on an errand in their village, that he first heard a piano being played; he described it as "sweeter than anything (he) had ever before listened to". Irresistibly drawn to the music that was coming from the open door of a home, he walked into the entrance of the parlor in his bare feet and stood listening, entranced, unnoticed at first by the young lady who was playing. When she stopped, he exclaimed with great fervor, "O lady, play some more!" Startled, she looked around and, unsympathetic to his appreciation of her playing, ordered, "Get out of here with your big feet!" Leaving crushed in spirit, he said afterwards that "the memory of (those) harmonies . . . seemed to (me) like heaven."

At the age of eleven, Philip left home to go to work on a farm; so, began a time in his life (until he was 16) that he worked at various jobs during the warmer months, while going to school in the colder months to get an education. Besides helping out on a farm, he worked at a lumber camp on the Pine Creek (home of the Pennsylvania "Grand Canyon"), served as an assistant cook, cut logs, and spent some time in a sawmill.

During that time, when Philip was twelve years old, the preaching of a local Baptist pastor led to a revival that broke out among the students at the school which he attended near the village of Elk Run; it was then and there that he first made a public profession of faith in Christ. Not long afterwards, he was baptized by immersion in a creek near his home; later, at the age of 17, he joined the Baptist Church of Cherry Flats in Tioga County. While he couldn't point to a particular time and place when he was converted, he also testified that he "couldn't remember a moment when he didn't love Jesus, wasn't sorry for his sin, or didn't pray." In a letter at that time to one of his sisters, he wrote, "My mind is established, with a full purpose of heart, to serve God, to live acceptably, and be prepared to meet my Judge in peace."

== Education ==
As Philip entered his later teen years, he continued his familiar pattern of attending school in the winter and working on a farm in the summer. But he soon realized that he did not just want to go to school to learn for himself, but to help others learn by teaching them. His first job as a teacher was at a school in Hartsville, New York, but the challenges of teaching helped him to see his need for further education. While he had already been awarded a Provisional Teacher's Certificate by the Superintendent of Bradford County on June 10, 1857, that fall he enrolled in the Susquehanna Collegiate Institute (SCI) of Towanda, Pennsylvania. There, for a semester, he took courses in algebra, grammar, physiology, and Latin, along with some vocal instruction. He was not ashamed to admit that, to pay his way through school, he became “a kind of chore-boy”, sawing wood, fetching water, and sweeping rooms; as he insisted, he was determined to “earn every penny I possibly can honorably.” He would have finished up his education at SCI if it were not for a visit from the school president of the Rome (PA) Township, who came to the Institute looking for someone to replace their teacher who was unable to finish out the term because of poor health.

While at SCI, Philip had attended his first musical convention in nearby Rome. There he met “Professor” J. G. Towner, who operated a local singing school at nearby Towner Hill, recognized his talent, and gave him his first formal voice instruction. He was also introduced to William B. Bradbury, who had come to the convention at the invitation of "Professor" Towner. At the time, Bradbury had just begun writing sacred music for children and was probably the first person Philip had ever met who made a career of Christian music. Encouraged by Bradbury to become a music teacher, a lasting friendship began between the two men. When the older man died of tuberculosis at age 51 a decade later, Philip wrote a song, "We Love Him," in his honor:

"We love him, though his friendly hand has never clasped our own;

His gentle voice and loving smile we never yet have known.

We love the sweet, the blessed songs that he to us has giv’n;

We know he loved us here on earth; we love him though in heaven."

== Early career and marriage ==
In the year Philip began teaching at the Rome Academy, he met a farmer and Christian named O. F. Young; he, his wife, and his mother-in-law "Grandma Allen", along with their five children, were a singing family. Since Mr. Young was on the school board, he invited Philip to make their house his home, and it wasn't long before Philip was considered part of the family. He even sent for his younger sister, Elizabeth, to join him for the winter and to attend the school where he taught.

The Young children were among Philip's students. The oldest daughter, Lucy, was 17 when he first took the teaching position; a little less than three years younger than Philip, she was also a close friend of his sister Elizabeth. As Whittle put it in Memoirs, they soon “found ‘ere long that they were necessary to each other’s happiness.” So, on a Sunday morning on June 1, 1859, less than a year after they had first met, the young couple traveled six miles downstream to the little town of Wysox, with the bride's parents accompanying them, to be married by the minister there in the parlor of his home. Philip was almost 21; Lucy was 18. On that day, in his journal, Philip wrote, “June 1, 1859 – married to Miss Lucy J. Young, the very best thing I could have done."

According to his memoir Philip and Lucy had a relationship of love and respect. He especially appreciated Lucy's faith and her godly influence on him, calling her “an extraordinary woman.” He added, “You don’t know many women of such unselfish devotion, sublime faith, and childlike trust. She lives so near the Lord that I ought to be a good man. Humanly speaking, my life would have been a failure without her. God bless her!” Later, he wrote that he was more indebted to his wife than anyone else for what he was and what he had done.

By the summer of 1860, Philip realized what little he knew about music and was eager to learn more, yet he was frustrated because he had no means to further his education. Then he heard about an opportunity in Geneseo, New York, where a Normal Academy of Music would be held; there, he could learn musical notation and harmony, among other things. Looking over the program, he knew it was just what he needed, but he could not afford to go! Discouraged, he plopped down on the old settee in the family sitting room, next to Grandma Allen, muttering aloud that he was destined to be just a lowly farmhand and a country schoolmaster for the rest of his life. When his wife's grandmother asked him how much it would cost to go, he told her he needed $30; she was sure she had that much in an old stocking where she had been saving silver pieces for years. Because of her generosity, he spent six weeks in the "hardest study of his life" at the Normal Academy.

Now that he felt sufficiently trained, Philip was ready to strike out on his own in teaching music. His father-in-law helped by providing him with a horse, which Philip called “Old Fanny.” Father Young also found a melodeon (a small reed organ, much like our keyboards today, but operated by suction bellows) for $20. It was easy to transport, especially after Philip made a wooden box for it, which let him take on many students in the Rome area. He also organized and taught at various singing schools, which usually met one or two nights a week over several weeks. Over the next three years, he continued his pattern of working on the Young farm in the summer and instructing his music students in the winter months, while also tuning pianos and melodeons.

Always thrifty, Philip saved a thousand dollars in May 1863 to buy a small cottage in the heart of Rome. He wanted to move his parents there because his father was 65. For a year or so, he and Lucy worked tirelessly to make it livable, then invited “Father Bliss” to visit. After he arrived in Rome, they took him for a wagon ride down the main street of their village. “Where would you like to live, Father Bliss?” they asked. He was interested in several of the homes he saw, but none appealed to the young couple, so Philip turned the wagon around, drove the team back down the street, and stopped at a cute little home with a porch out front and a large yard. Helping his father out of the wagon, Philip announced, “This is your new home, father!” Isaac was so moved that he sat down on a chair on the stoop and, with tears running down his cheeks, exclaimed, “Phil, I never expected to have so good a home on earth as this!” Sadly, his father died only a few months later, on January 20, 1864, just short of his 67th birthday; his gravestone can be found in the village cemetery within the walls surrounding the cenotaph honoring Philip and Lucy's memory. His last words to his son were, “Philip, take care of your mother,” a charge he faithfully kept. After Father Bliss’ passing, his wife Lydia moved to Towanda to live with Philip's sister. Today, the Bliss cottage is home to the P. P. Bliss Songwriter's Museum.

== Later career ==
Philip Bliss’ songwriting career was brief, lasting only about a dozen years, from 1864 to 1876. The first song he ever wrote was, surprisingly, a somewhat secular but sentimental one, with no explicit mention of Christ: it was titled “Lora Vale,” a ballad about a woman who was dying with her loved ones by her side. The end of the first verse went like this:

She was dying, gentle Lora;

She was passing like a sigh

From a world of love and beauty

To a brighter world on high.

But Lora Vale evidently knew the Lord, because as the song goes on to say . . .

She was almost at the river,

When the light broke from the sky,

And she smiled and whispered faintly,

“I am not afraid to die.”

Wanting to have it published, Philip's first thought was William B. Bradbury, the man who had so profoundly influenced his life at the first musical convention he had ever attended. Bradbury, however, rejected it, for whatever reason. (Was it not spiritual enough?) Friends, however, encouraged him to send it to George F. Root of the music house Root & Cady in Chicago. The next year, it was marketed as sheet music and became fairly successful, selling several thousand copies. Philip’s good friend, James McGranahan, saw a proof of it and liked it.

The writing and publication of “Lora Vale,” along with the correspondence that followed, led to an invitation for the Blisses to move west to Chicago to work for Root & Cady. Philip would hold music conventions and give concerts throughout Illinois. His employment was briefly interrupted in the summer of 1865 when he was drafted into the United States Army, but after serving only two weeks, he was honorably discharged, as the Civil War was nearly over. On November 21, he returned to Chicago as a member of the Yankee Boys, a men's quartet consisting of J. G. Towner, James McGranahan, and one other man, whose plan was to sing for Root & Cady at patriotic meetings. Unfortunately, within a month the group broke up because they couldn't secure enough concerts, but since Philip's previous work for the firm had been so satisfactory, his former employer asked him to stay on. He was offered $150 a month, plus expenses, but told them that he'd work for just $100 a month.

All told, except for his brief stint in the Army, Philip represented Root & Cady for eight years, holding musical conventions for one to four weeks in various cities and towns (twelve in Illinois and one in New York) and giving sacred concerts; he also supplemented his income with private music instruction. In the meantime, for at least the first six months, Lucy worked as a salesclerk in Root & Cady’s store, then in the Crosby Opera House building; after that, she accompanied her husband on his travels. During the summer, they would return to Rome to visit the old homestead, where Philip could write more music and produce many of his best works.

It wasn't until four years after Philip and Lucy arrived in Chicago that they first met the famous evangelist Dwight L. Moody. One particular Sunday night, before their own church’s evening service, they were out for a walk on Clark Street when they came across Moody standing on the steps of the nearby courthouse. As he invited those present to follow him inside, they decided to hear him. That night, the usual song leader was not there, so the singing was on the weak side; Philip tried to help from the audience, which, of course, caught the evangelist’s attention. After the meeting, as Moody shook hands with those on their way out, Philip and Lucy approached him. They had a brief conversation, during which he learned who they were; he then invited Philip to help with the singing at his meetings whenever he was in town on a Sunday night. Philip agreed; he even showed up for Moody’s noon-time services if he was in Chicago for longer periods. Afterward, the evangelist was heard to say, “To think that such a singer as Bliss should have been around here for the last four years and we did not know him.”

In the summer of 1870, Philip first learned from Daniel W. Whittle about an opportunity to serve as song leader and choir director at the First Congregational Church of Chicago, which was preparing to move into its new building; Dr. E. P. Goodwin was the pastor. Philip and Dr. Goodwin shared the same view on the place of music in the church: that it should not be to entertain, but to exalt God. A few months later, Philip took on an additional role – Superintendent of the Sabbath (Sunday) School. He loved children, and they loved him in return. Their parents were just as glad to see him as their children were.

In 1869, Bliss formed an association with Dwight L. Moody. Moody and others urged him to give up his job and become a missionary singer. In 1874, Bliss decided he was called to full-time Christian evangelism. Bliss made significant amounts of money from royalties and gave them to charity and to support his evangelical endeavors.

Bliss wrote the gospel song "Hold the Fort" after hearing Major Daniel Webster Whittle narrate an experience in the American Civil War.

== Death ==
On 29 December 1876, the Pacific Express train on which Bliss and his wife were traveling approached Ashtabula, Ohio. When the train was nearly across the bridge it collapsed and the carriages fell into the ravine below. It was stated in many newspaper accounts of the time that Bliss escaped from the wreck, but the carriages caught fire and Bliss returned to try to extricate his wife. This account was only given by J.E. Burchell. As mentioned in the P.P. Bliss Memoirs, written in 1877 by D.W. Whittle this account by J.E. Burchell was only his conjecture. In fact, Mr. Whittle showed a picture of Bliss to all surviving passengers and no one recognized Mr. Bliss but only one lady who gave no account of seeing him during the accident. No trace of either Mr. Bliss or his wife, Lucy, was discovered. Ninety-two of the 159 passengers are believed to have died in what became known as the Ashtabula River Railroad Disaster.

The Blisses were survived by their two sons, George and Philip Paul, then aged four and one, respectively.

A monument to Bliss was erected in Rome, Pennsylvania.

Found in his trunk, which survived the crash and fire, was a manuscript bearing the lyrics of the only well-known Bliss Gospel song for which he did not write a tune: "I Will Sing of My Redeemer." Soon thereafter, set to a tune specially written for it by James McGranahan, it became one of the first songs recorded by Thomas Edison.

Bliss's house in Rome, Pennsylvania, is now operated as the Philip P. Bliss Gospel Songwriters Museum.

== Works ==
According to the Philip P. Bliss Gospel Songwriters Museum, the books of songs by Bliss are as follows: The Charm (1871); The Song Tree, a collection of parlor and concert music (1872); The Sunshine for Sunday Schools (1873); The Joy for conventions and for church choir music (1873); and Gospel Songs for Gospel meetings and Sunday schools (1874). All of these books were copyrighted by John Church and Co.

In addition to these publications, in 1875, Bliss compiled, and in connection with Ira D. Sankey, edited Gospel Hymns and Sacred Songs. He brought many Methodist hymns in his suitcase with across the Atlantic. One of his most repeated by Bliss was "Man of Sorrows! What a name". In 1876, his last work was the preparation of the book known as Gospel Hymns No. 2, Sankey being associated with him as editor. These last two books are published by John Church and Co. and Biglow and Main jointly - the work of Mr. Bliss in them, under the copyright of John Church and Co. The gospel songs were popular fetching $30,000 shortly before his death.

Many of his pieces appear in the books of George F. Root and Horatio R. Palmer, and many were published in sheet music form. A large number of his popular pieces were published in The Prize, a book of Sunday school songs edited by Root in 1870.

Three of his hymns appear in the 1985 hymnbook of the Church of Jesus Christ of Latter-day Saints: Brightly Beams Our Father's Mercy (#335) (also known as Let the Lower Lights Be Burning); More Holiness Give Me (#131); and Should You Feel Inclined to Censure (#235) (words by an anonymous writer put to the tune of "Brightly Beams Our Father's Mercy"). James McGranahan's tune for "I Will Sing of My Redeemer"—known simply as "My Redeemer" is also used, paired with the text of O My Father (#292).
