= Ashtabula River railroad disaster =

1876 railroad bridge collapse in Ohio

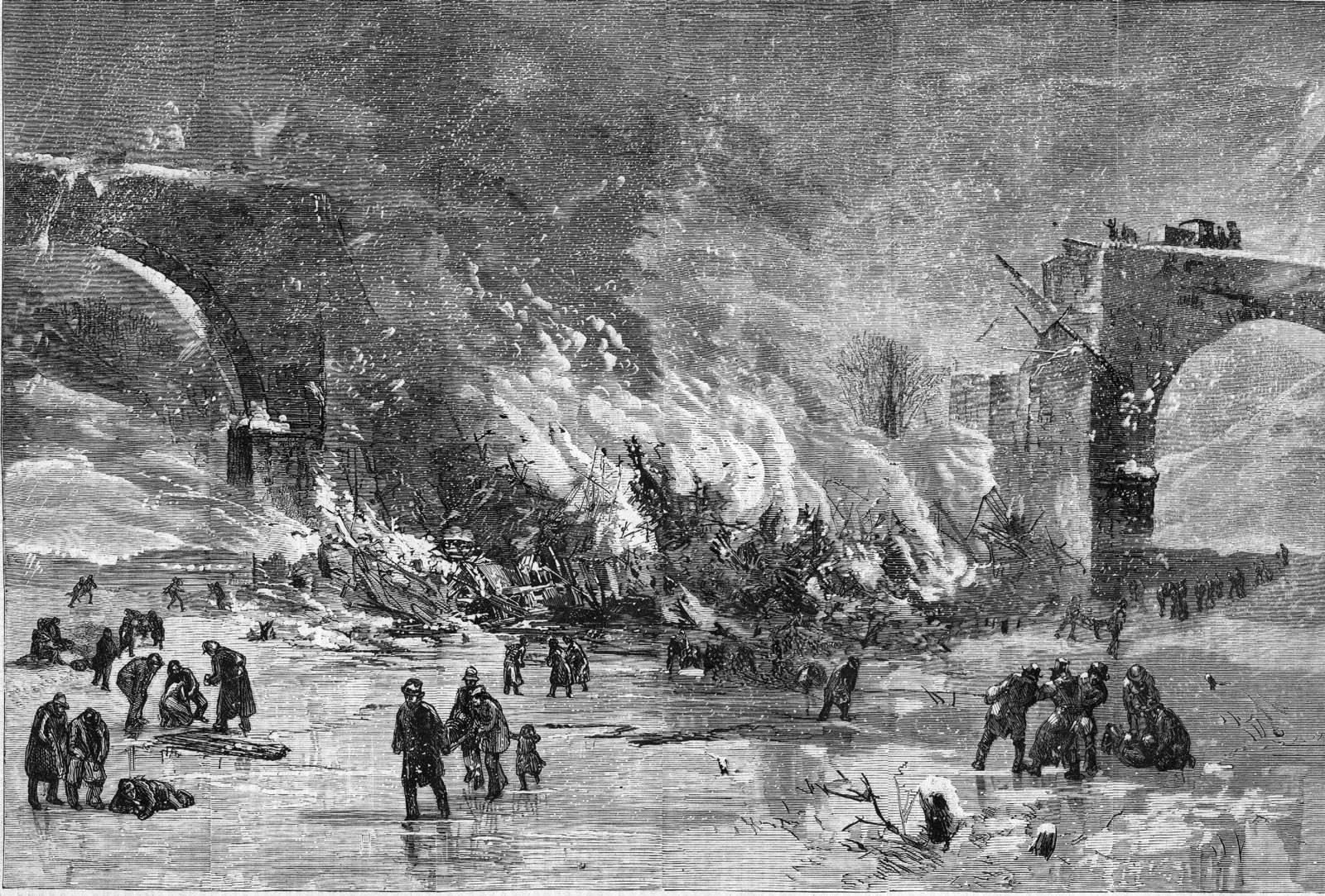
- Wood engraving published in Harper's Weekly, January 20, 1877. The locomotive Socrates is at upper right

Details
- Date: December 29, 1876; 149 years ago About 7:30 pm
- Location: Ashtabula, Ohio, U.S.
- Coordinates: 41.8785°N 80.7894°W
- Operator: Lake Shore and Michigan Southern Railway
- Incident type: Derailment and fire
- Cause: Bridge collapse due to Structural failure

Statistics
- Trains: 1
- Crew: 19
- Deaths: 92 (approximately)
- Injured: 64

The Ashtabula River railroad disaster (also called the Ashtabula horror, the Ashtabula Bridge disaster, and the Ashtabula train disaster) was caused by the collapse of a bridge over the Ashtabula River near the town of Ashtabula, Ohio, in the United States on Friday, December 29, 1876. The Pacific Express, a train of the Lake Shore and Michigan Southern Railway, was passing over the bridge as it collapsed, falling into the icy river. All but the lead locomotive plunged into the river. The train's oil lanterns and coal-fired heating stoves set the wooden cars alight. Firefighters declined to extinguish the flames, leaving individuals to try to pull survivors from the wreck. Many who survived the crash burned to death in the wreckage. The accident killed approximately 92 of the 160 people aboard. It was the worst rail accident in the U.S. in the 19th century and the worst rail accident in U.S. history until the Great Train Wreck of 1918. It remains the third-deadliest rail accident in U.S. history.

The coroner's report found that the bridge, located about 1,000 feet (300 m) from the railway station, had been improperly designed by the railroad company president, poorly constructed, and inadequately inspected. As a result of the accident, a hospital was built in the town and a federal system set up to formally investigate fatal railroad accidents.

== Design and construction of the bridge ==
In 1863, officials of the Cleveland, Painesville and Ashtabula Railroad (CP&A; one of the predecessors of the Lake Shore and Michigan Southern Railway), (Note: The Lake Shore & Southern Michigan Railway was formed on April 6, 1869. Many sources say that the LS&MS built the bridge over the Ashtabula River, but these sources appear to be using a form of literary shorthand—using the company's better-known later name.) decided to replace the wooden bridge over the Ashtabula River just east of the village of Ashtabula, Ohio, with an iron structure. Amasa Stone was president of the CP&A. His construction firm had built the CP&A main line from 1850 to 1852, and Stone had purchased the patent rights to brother-in-law William Howe's truss bridge in 1842. Stone resolved to construct a Howe truss bridge, a commonly used type of railroad bridge, and personally designed the new bridge. (Note: It is unclear if Stone or Tomlinson set the bridge's height-to-span ratio or the number of panels, or designed its connection points.) The longest span was 154 feet (47 m) long and 76 feet (23 m) above the river below. (Note: The bridge was 19.5 feet (5.9 m) wide.)

Stone also decided to award the contract for the ironwork to the Cleveland Rolling Mill (then known as Stone, Chisholm & Jones Company), an iron and steel company based in Cleveland, Ohio, which was managed by his older brother, Andros Stone. The I-beams were made by the mill. The mill also provided raw iron to the CP&A, which then made the cast and wrought iron elements according to the fabrication plans. Shop master mechanic Albert Congdon oversaw this latter work.

=== Design ===
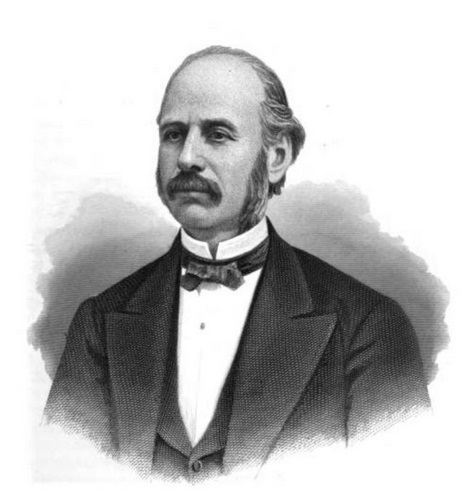
Amasa Stone, the bridge's designer

Amasa Stone's bridge was, by his own admission, experimental. He had constructed only one all-iron Howe truss bridge before, a 5-foot (1.5 m) high, 30-foot (9 m) long railroad bridge over the Ohio and Erie Canal in Cleveland. (Note: This bridge was Ohio's first all-iron bridge.)

Joseph Tomlinson, a well-known bridge builder and designer, was hired to flesh out Stone's design and create the fabrication drawings for all the bridge components. Tomlinson designed the bridge's lower chord to have a camber (Note: "Camber is an upward curvature given to a beam or girder, or some line in it, in order to ensure its horizontality when fully loaded.") of 6 inches (150 mm). When the falsework supporting the bridge was removed and the dead load of the bridge came into play, the camber would drop to between 3.5 to 4 inches (90 to 100 mm). Tomlinson was alarmed when Stone demanded that the bridge be constructed completely of iron, rather than a combination of wood and iron. (Note: The patented Howe truss bridge design used wooden beams for the diagonal and horizontal members, and iron posts for the vertical members.) An all-iron bridge would have a much greater dead load, reducing the bridge's live load (its ability to carry trains). He also concluded that the beams and posts Stone intended to use were undersized. (Note: The chords, braces, and counter-braces were all made of I-beams. The vertical posts were made of rod. Each I-beam was 6 inches (150 mm) thick and 8 inches (200 mm) wide.) Tomlinson proposed riveting plates to the I-beams to strengthen them, but Stone angrily refused. Stone demanded that Tomlinson make the changes he required. Tomlinson refused, and was fired from the design effort. Stone then ordered the CP&A's chief engineer, Charles Collins, to make the desired changes to the bridge design. Collins refused, and was fired from the design effort. Stone then made the changes to the design. (Note: Brockman says that the design changes were made with the assistance of A. L. Rogers, a carpenter with no bridge design or construction experience. Civil engineer Björn Åkesson points out that, since all-iron Howe trusses were so rare at the time, the use of a carpenter should not be considered surprising. Amasa Stone, however, said in 1877 that Rogers only had supervision of construction. Rogers himself denied designing any of the bridge.)

Stone made additional changes to the design. In a Howe truss bridge, the vertical posts connect the upper and lower chords (main parallels) in the truss. The deck on which the train travels usually hangs from these posts; the greater the live load, the greater the tension on the posts. The bracing reacts in compression, counteracting the tension. Amasa Stone inverted this design so that only the upper chord (now at the bottom of the bridge) provided tension. Where diagonal braces did not receive the extra compression from a live load, inverted Howe truss bridges had a tendency to buckle where the vertical posts were attached to the deck with cast iron angle blocks. Stone's other major change involved the end panels. In the traditional Howe truss bridge, the end panel on each side of each end of the bridge has three vertical posts and three diagonal braces. Only five Howe truss bridges ever built by 1863 had just one vertical post and two diagonal braces in the end panels. These were known as "Single Howe" bridges. Amasa Stone used the "Single Howe" design for the end panels at Ashtabula. Thus, the bridge's entire structure relied on just 12 beams and posts (three at each end).

=== Design of the angle blocks ===
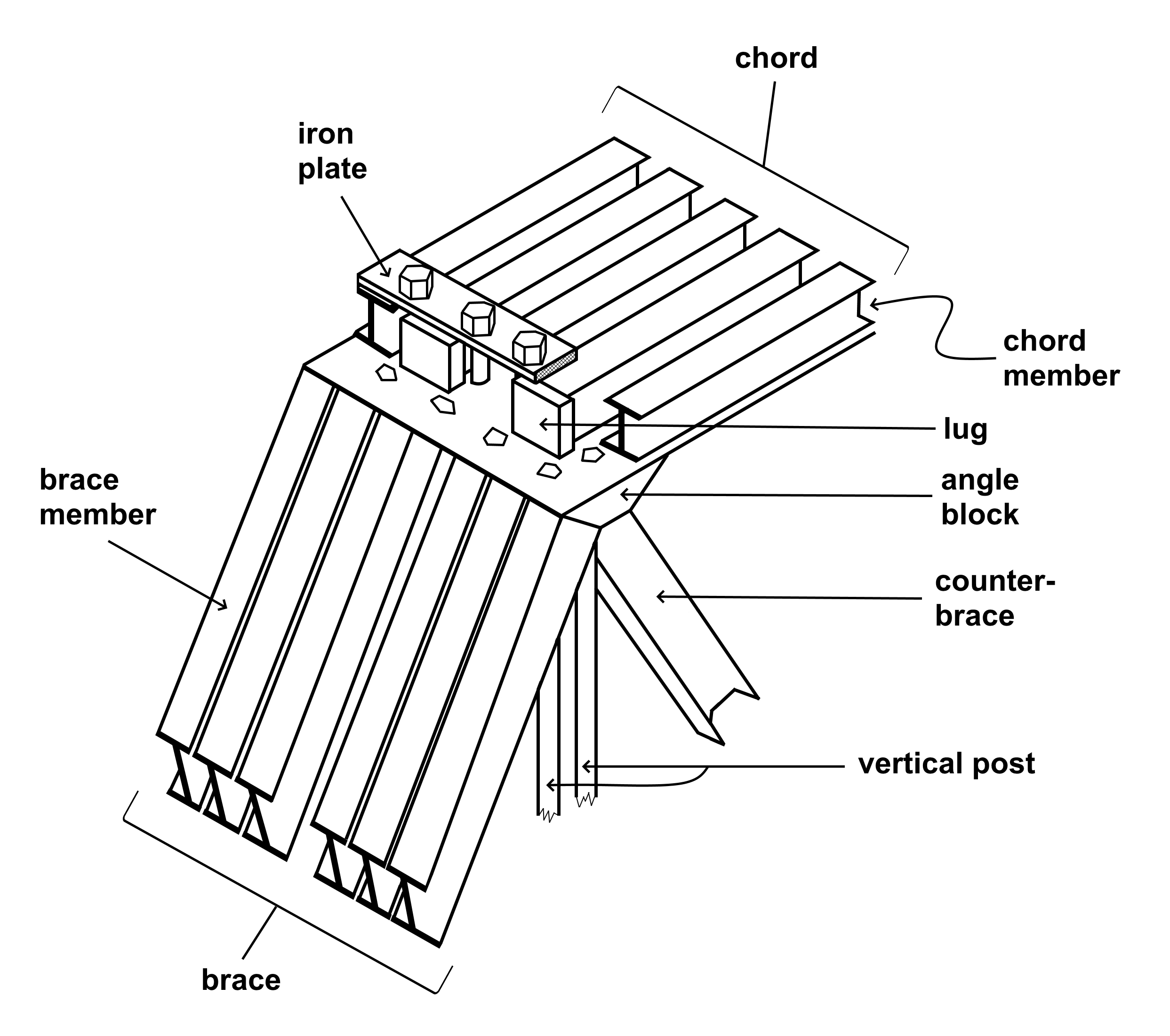
The chord, diagonals, angle blocks, and vertical posts of the Ashtabula Bridge, as drawn from original plans by Charles MacDonald in 1877

Gasparini and Fields claim that the exact design of the angle blocks and the ends (the "bearings") of the diagonals are lost to history.

Civil engineer Charles MacDonald, who inspected the bridge's original plans in 1877, (Note: MacDonald visited the scene of the disaster a few days after the bridge's collapse and made extensive drawings and notes. He made a copy of the bridge's building plan (then in the possession of John Newell, the railroad's general manager), and read through the bills of sale to determine what materials had actually been delivered. About a month later, he re-examined the wreckage of the bridge (by this time, it had been removed to the LS&MS shops in the Collingwood neighborhood of Cleveland).) described and made drawings of part of the angle blocks. He noted that the vertical posts were made of iron pipe 3 inches (76 mm) in diameter with a wall 0.5 inches (13 mm) thick. Inside the pipe ran an iron rod 2 inches (51 mm) thick. The top of the rod passed through the space between the members of the chord at the top of the bridge and then through a gib-plate. (Note: A gib-plate is a "plate or strap which holds in place the piece to which it is fastened and yet leaves it free to move in a prescribed direction.") A nut and washer screwed onto the upper end of the rod, creating tension as well as securing the gib-plate in place. Those angle blocks at the top of the bridge had vertical, squarish lugs. Those members of the chord which ended atop an angle block had their bearings placed against the lug. These lugs served to transmit stress from the chord to the angle block and thence to the diagonals. These upper angle blocks also had lugs facing inward, to which were attached (by means MacDonald did not describe) the lateral braces. The interior side of each upper angle block also had a recess to accept a lug and a tap bolt. (Note: A tap bolt is a bolt which is screwed into a threaded (or "tapped") hole rather attached using a nut.) The tap bolt was used to connect the lug on the end of the sway rod to the angle block. (Note: Sway rods only connected to every other angle block.)

MacDonald described (but did not publish a drawing of) the angle blocks at the bottom of the bridge. The bottom of the rod in the vertical posts screwed into these angle blocks. The members of the chord at the bottom of the bridge were flat bars, not I-beams, each bar measuring 5 by 0.375 inches (127.0 by 9.5 mm). Where a member of the chord ended at an angle block, a 3-by-1-inch (76 by 25 mm) lug was forged at the base of the bar. This lug fit into a slot in the angle block. The angle blocks which made up the chord at the bottom of the bridge also had lugs facing inward, to which were attached (by means MacDonald did not describe) the lateral braces.

MacDonald and Gasparini and Fields noted that the diagonal I-beams were designed to connect to both the upper and lower angle blocks with the flanges of the I-beam in a vertical position. The web of the I-beam fit into a horizontal slot between two lugs.

It is also known that, at the ends of the bridge, only half of each angle block received load because Stone used only a single diagonal in the end panel. This put enormous shear stress on the bridgeward side of these angle blocks.

=== Construction ===
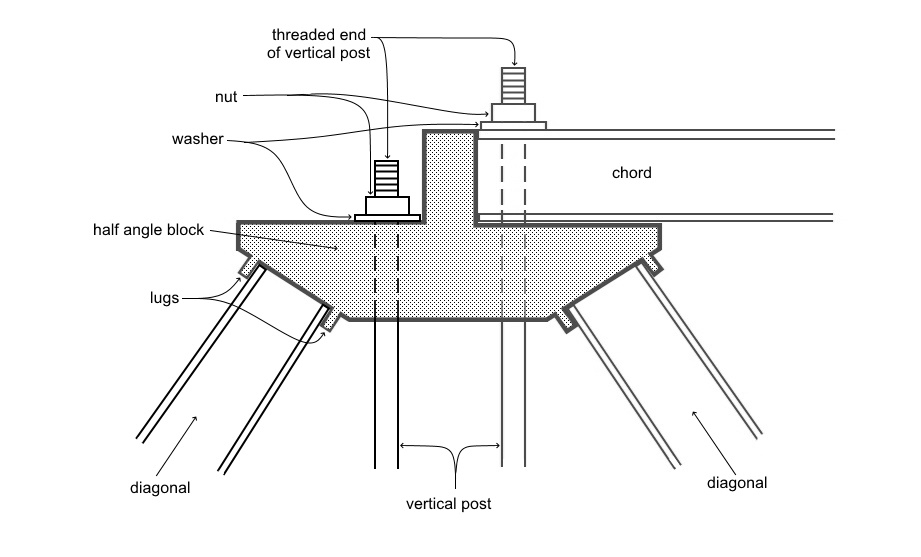
One design for a half-angle block. The attached chord puts immense downward (shear) stress on one side of the block only, for which the block is not designed.

The Ashtabula River bridge was erected in 1865 using Stone's design and plans and partly under his supervision. Tomlinson was the bridge's original construction supervisor, but Stone said he fired him for "inefficiency" at some point during the bridge's construction. Tomlinson was replaced by A. L. Rogers.

When construction began, Tomlinson observed that the I-beams intended for use as diagonals were smaller than the fabrication plans called for.

The amount of camber created a problem during construction. At Congdon's suggestion, Rogers built falsework to support construction of a bridge with a 5-to-7-inch (130 to 180 mm) camber. Stone, now himself supervising Rogers' work, ordered the camber reduced to 3.5 inches (89 mm). With the members of the upper chord now too long, Rogers had the bearings shaved down. It is clear Rogers ordered other changes as well, but it is uncertain what these included. Gasparini and Fields suggest he had the lugs atop the angle block planed down as well. When the falsework began to be removed, the dead load caused the bridge to bend about 2.5 inches (64 mm) below horizontal. The bridge was jacked up and the falsework put back in place. Stone then ordered the chord members to be returned to their original lengths, restoring Tomlinson's intended camber. Rather than ordering new I-beams, Rogers used shims to close the space between the bearings and the lugs.

When the falsework was removed a second time, the bridge buckled where the vertical posts connected to the deck. Several diagonals also buckled. (Note: Gasparini and Fields noted that Rogers had prestressed the bridge very tightly before the falsework was moved. Rogers admitted that this buckled a few diagonals even before the falsework was removed. Although Rogers then loosened the vertical posts to eliminate visible buckling, the diagonals were likely very close to their buckling load—even though no live load was yet on the bridge.) Once more, the falsework went back in place.

To correct this problem, Stone added more iron I-beams to the diagonals to strengthen them. The placement, size, and number of beams added is not clear, but Stone likely added two I-beams to the brace in the end panel, two I-beams to the brace in the first panel from the end, and one I-beam to the second panel from the end. This worsened the bridge's dead load problem. Collins, Congdon, Rogers, and Stone all later testified that the I-beams making up the diagonals were now turned 90 degrees, so that the flanges were horizontal. Congdon says that he realized the I-beams would carry more live load if they were rotated. (Note: Brockman says that turning the beams so the flanges were horizontal actually weakened the ability of the braces to reinforce the bridge, indicating Congdon was incorrect.) Collins, Rogers, and Stone believed workers had installed the beams incorrectly (on their sides). (Note: Brockman says that workers incorrectly installed the I-beam braces during repair work.) To make the change, Stone had workers cut away portions of each diagonal I-beam's web at the bearing, enabling the web to fit over the lugs. This weakened the new diagonals. There is also some evidence that the angle blocks were damaged while the braces and counter-braces were rotated.

The bridge was prestressed again. In every other panel connection, the diagonal braces were fitted to the angle blocks using shims rather than by tightening the vertical posts and putting the diagonals under compression. This meant that the shims carried the weight of a live load, rather than the braces themselves. It is also possible that the shims created uneven contact, causing angle blocks to undergo both bending and shear stress. Nevertheless, the bridge did not sag this time.

Upon completion, the bridge was tested by having three locomotives run over the bridge at speed. A second test had the three engines stand still on the bridge. Deflection was minimal and the bridge rebounded satisfactorily. (Note: The weight of the engines was estimated at 40 short tons (36 t) each in 1887, but at 30 short tons (27 t) each in 1993.)

== Bridge collapse and fire ==
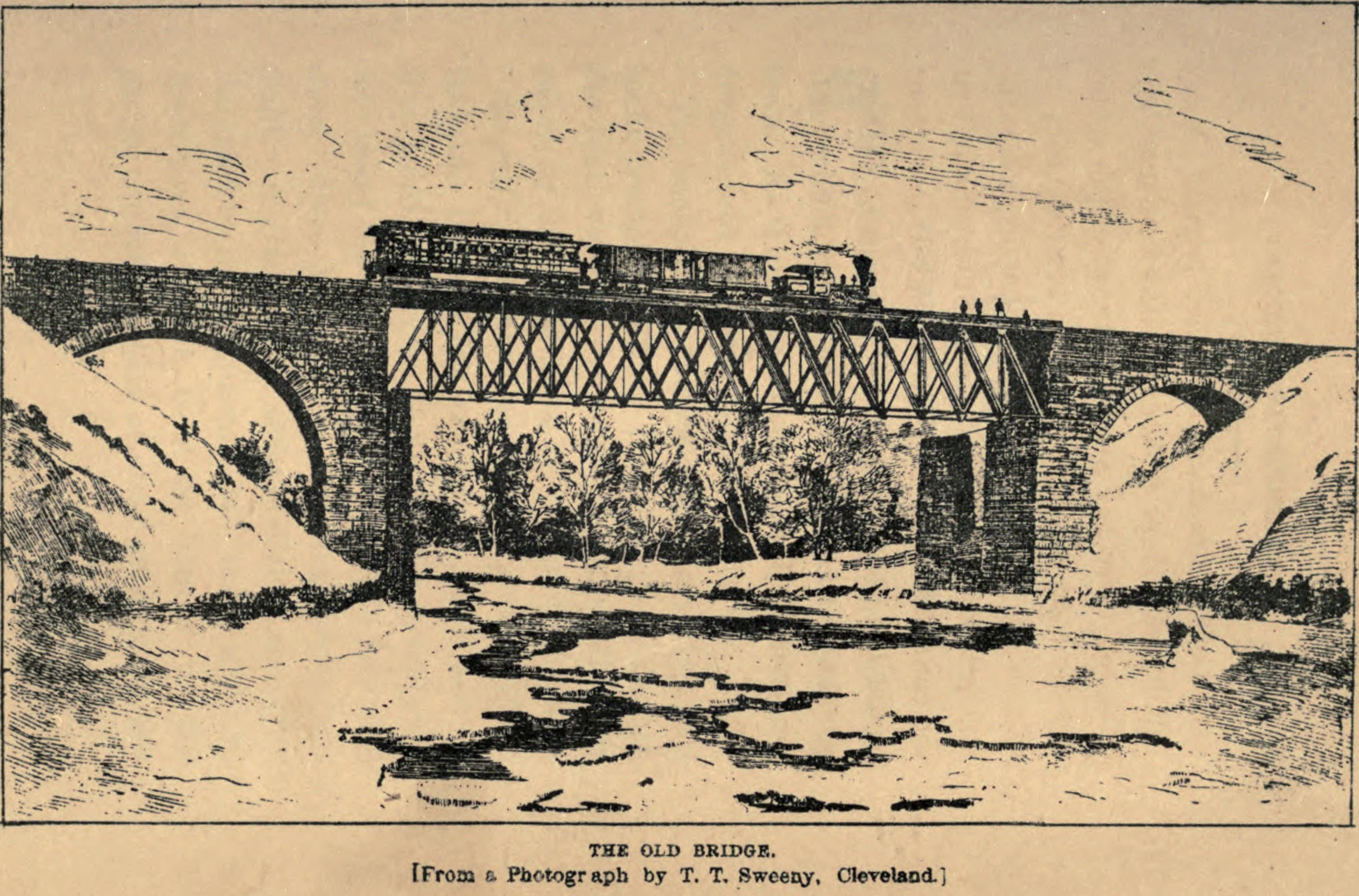
The iron bridge before collapse

=== Blizzard conditions ===
Train No. 5 of the Lake Shore and Michigan Southern Railway, (Note: The CP&A changed its name to the Lake Shore Railway on June 17, 1868, and merged with the Michigan Southern and Northern Indiana Railroad on April 6, 1869, to form the Lake Shore and Michigan Southern Railway (LS&MS). This was followed on August 1, 1869, by the merger of the Buffalo and Erie Railroad into the LS&MS, which placed the line from Chicago to Buffalo under the control of a single company for the first time.) known as The Pacific Express, left Buffalo, New York, at 2 PM on December 29, 1876, 1 hour and 8 minutes behind schedule. A powerful blizzard had begun hitting northern Ohio, northwest Pennsylvania, and western New York two days earlier. (Note: This was the third major blizzard to hit the area in less than a month.) More than 20 inches (510 mm) of snow had already fallen, and winds 24 to 54 miles per hour (39 to 87 km/h) were creating heavy snowdrifts on the railroad tracks 6 feet (1.8 m) deep in places. The snow was so heavy that, shortly after leaving Buffalo, a second engine was added to help pull the train.

The train left Erie, Pennsylvania, at 5:01 PM, an hour and 16 minutes behind schedule. (Note: Sources vary widely on how far behind schedule the train was: About one hour, one hour and 8 minutes, two hours, two and a half hours, and four hours. The LS&MS railroad timetable, however, shows that the train was due to depart Erie at 3:45 PM.) Its two locomotives, Socrates and Columbia, were hauling two baggage cars, two day-passenger coaches, two express coaches, a drawing room car (the Yokohama), three sleeper cars (the Palatine, which originated in New York City and was bound for Chicago; the City of Buffalo, which originated in Boston and was bound for Chicago; and the Osceo, a sleeper for passengers going to St. Louis), and a smoking car with about 150 to 200 passengers and 19 crew aboard. (Note: The Socrates was the lead engine.) (Note: Nash gives the composition of the train as four baggage cars, two coaches, three sleeping cars, a parlor car, and a smoking car. Orth says the train consisted of two baggage cars, two coaches, two express cars, three sleeping cars, a dining car, and a smoking car, while Bellamy says there were two baggage cars, two "passenger cars", two express cars, three sleeping cars, and a smoking car. The Ohio legislature's official report on the accident said there was one baggage car, four coaches, two express cars, three sleeping cars, and one smoking car.) (Note: The exact number of passengers cannot be known. Conductor Barnard Henn estimated from the tickets he collected that the train carried 127 to 131 adults, with an unknown number of children. However, he admitted his tickets would not show the total number of passengers on the train at the time of the accident nor those traveling on railroad-issued passes. Brakeman A.H. Stone believed the number of passengers was closer to 200, a number also used by historian Darrell E. Hamilton. A wide range of numbers is offered by other sources: 131, 147 (128 passengers and 19 crew), 156, 159, 160, 197 (the railroad's official count), "nearly 200", 130 to 300, "nearly 300" (the conductor's estimate) and "over 300". The day and express coaches sat 70 people each and were full, and the sleepers held 30 passengers each. The smoking car was "not well filled". Passengers on the train believed there were many more than 131, as they had difficulty finding seats and sleeping berths. The number of crew, 19, is more firmly established.) Two additional locomotives were needed to push the train away from the station due to the heavy snow.

=== Initial collapse and survival of the "Socrates" ===
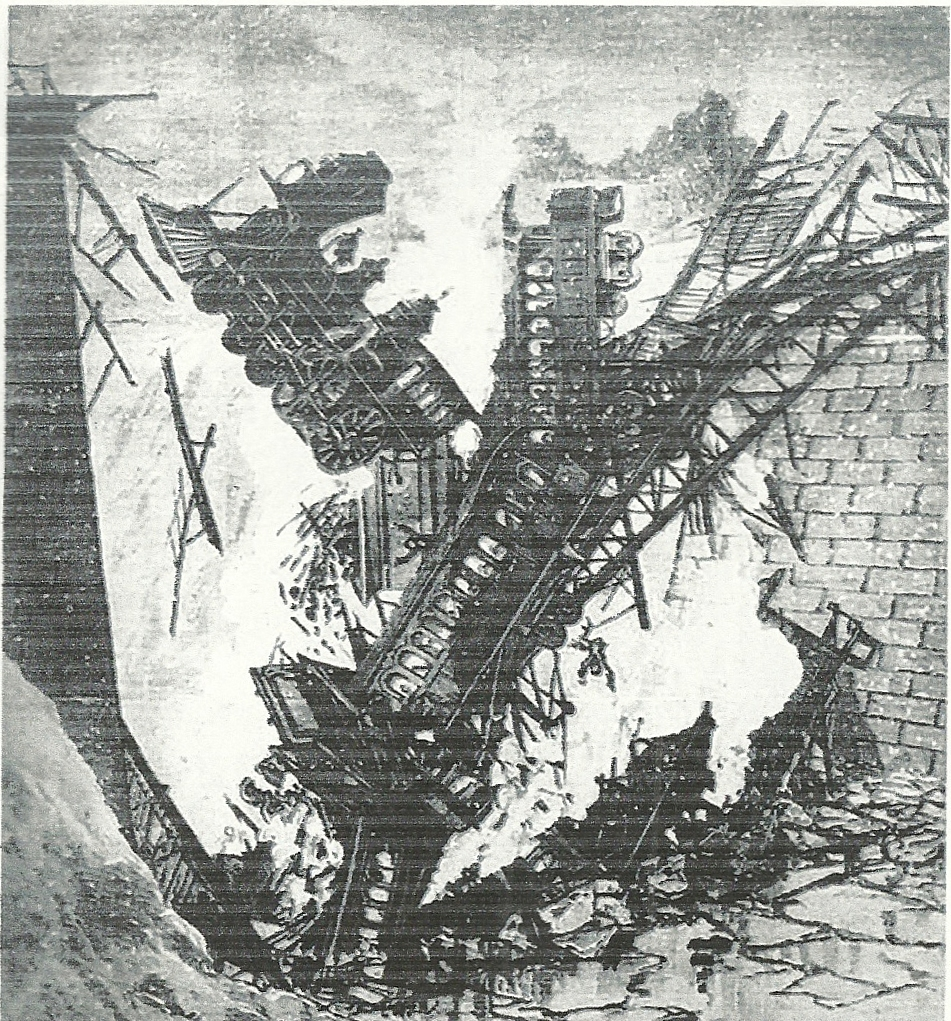
Illustration of the bridge collapse

The No. 5 was due to arrive in Cleveland at 7:05 PM, but at about 7:30 PM it was just reaching Ashtabula—an hour and 53 minutes behind schedule. About half an hour earlier, the No. 8 passenger train of the LS&MS passed over the Ashtabula River bridge without incident, heading east. The bridge over the Ashtabula River was about 1,000 feet (300 m) east of the Ashtabula station, and the locomotives shut off their steam (cutting off power to the drive) about 66 to 99 feet (20 to 30 m) east of the bridge to allow the train to glide into the station. As the Pacific Express crossed the bridge, it was doing 10 to 15 miles per hour (16 to 24 km/h) (according to the locomotive engineers). Visibility was practically nonexistent, at most one or two car lengths.

As the Socrates neared the western abutment, engineer Daniel McGuire heard a crack and felt his locomotive drop slowly downward. Realizing the bridge was collapsing beneath him, he opened the throttle to maximum. The Socrates lurched ahead, just as the weight of the 11 cars began to pull on the Columbia behind it. The connection between the two locomotives snapped, enabling the Socrates to make it off the bridge. The rear trucks on his tender hung in the air, but the forward movement of the Socrates pulled the tender forward and it regained the rails and solid ground. McGuire brought the Socrates to a halt about 100 yards (91 m) down the track, and began repeatedly sounding his whistle and ringing the train bell in alarm.

=== Collapse of the remaining bridge ===
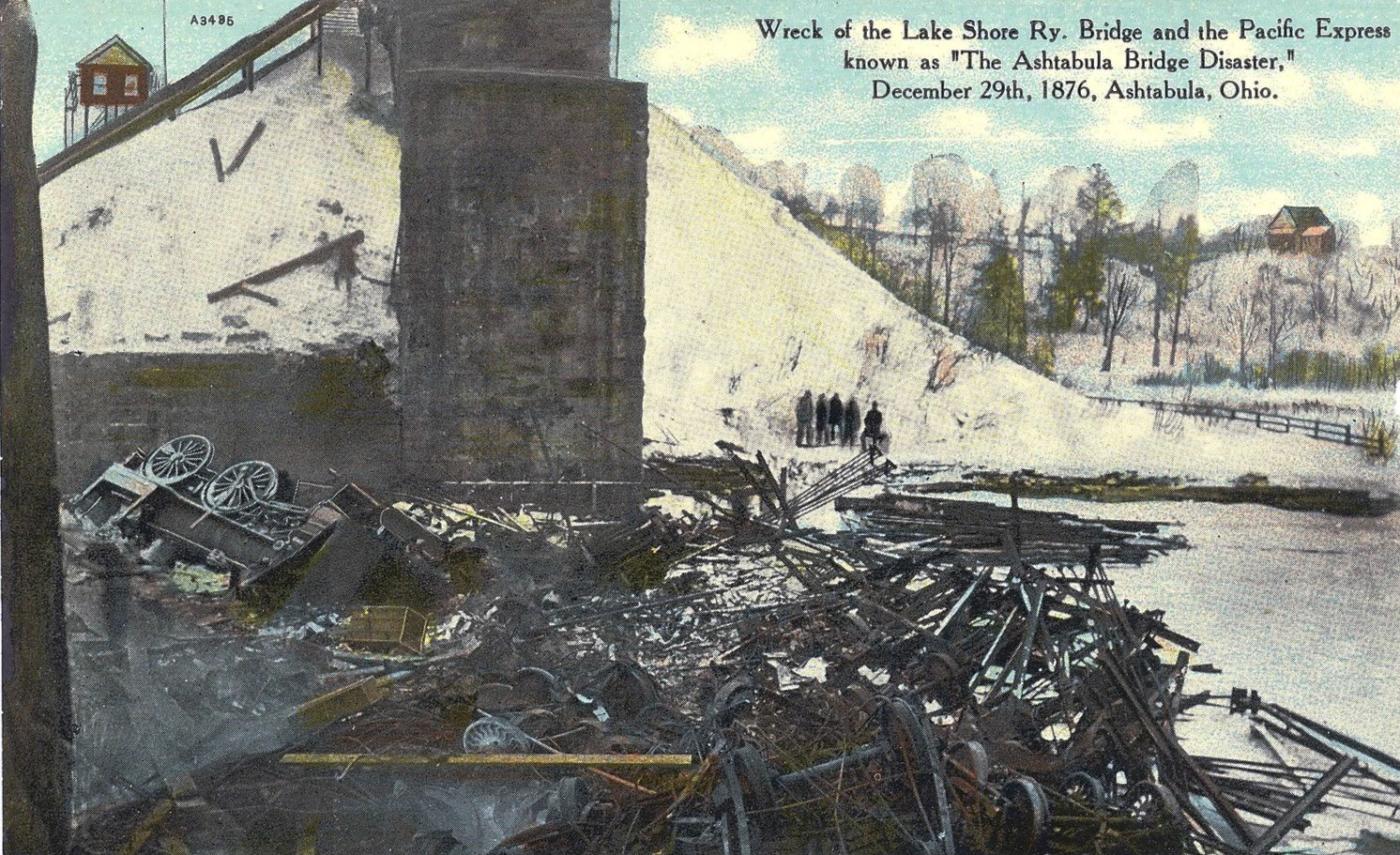
Postcard photo of the wreck. The view is toward the west abutment; the locomotive "Columbia" can be seen in the wreckage at left.

The Columbia and the 11 cars behind it acted like a linked chain load. The bridge's collapse was therefore not sudden, but rather somewhat slow and piecemeal. The Columbia struck the abutment, the engine supported by the stonework while the tender hung downward toward the river valley. The first express car fell into the ravine, (Note: The river valley varied in depth from 70 to 135 feet (21 to 41 m), which may account for the discrepancy in sources regarding how far the train fell.) crashing nose-first into the ground at the base of the abutment. (Note: It may have actually hit the abutment on the way down.) The Columbia slipped backward off the abutment, landing upside-down and backward atop the first express car. It then fell onto its side, its trucks pointing north.

The second express car and the two baggage cars landed largely upright, slightly south of the bridge. The second baggage car was slightly askew, its nose resting against the western abutment and its rear pointing southeast. Most of the bridge's upper chord (the bottom of the bridge) crashed to the ground north of the bridge. The lower chord (at the top of the bridge) and what remained of the deck held for a moment, then fell directly down to land atop the locomotive, express cars, and baggage cars. Momentum pulled the rest of the train into the space where the bridge used to be. The first passenger coach landed upright in mid-stream atop the wreckage of the bridge and the second express car. (Note: More people survived from the first passenger coach than any other car, because it landed upright and because it was not hit by any other part of the train.) The second passenger car twisted in the air as it fell, landing on its side atop the bridge and first baggage car. The smoking car, having broken free of the passenger coach ahead of it, moved more freely. It struck the forward part of the second passenger coach, crushing it, before being propelled into the first passenger coach. (It is widely believed most people in the first passenger coach died when the smoking car fell on them.)

Momentum also carried the parlor car Yokohama and the three sleeper cars into the chasm. All of them landed about 80 feet (24 m) south of the bridge. The Yokohama landed upright in mid-stream, and the sleeper Palatine landed mostly right-side up beside it to the north. The sleeper City of Buffalo then nose-dived into the rear of the Palatine, partially crushing it and killing several people. It continued through the Palatine into the rear of the Yokohama, pushing the parlor car onto its side. The Buffalo smashed forward along the length of the parlor car, likely killing everyone inside. The rear of the Buffalo lay atop the Palatine, high in the air. An eyewitness said no one in the City of Buffalo survived the crash. The final sleeper, the Osceo, landed on the east bank of the river, mostly upright.

=== Fire and deaths ===
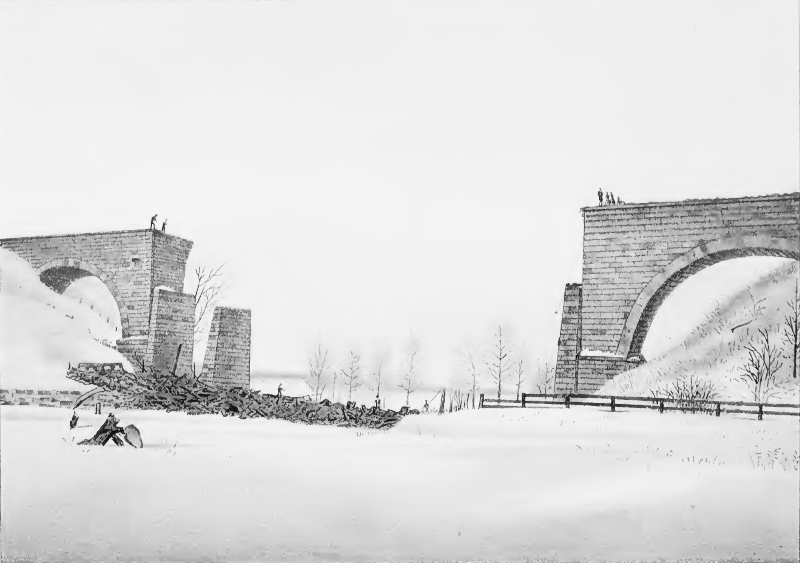
1878 drawing based on a January 1877 photograph of the ruins of the bridge

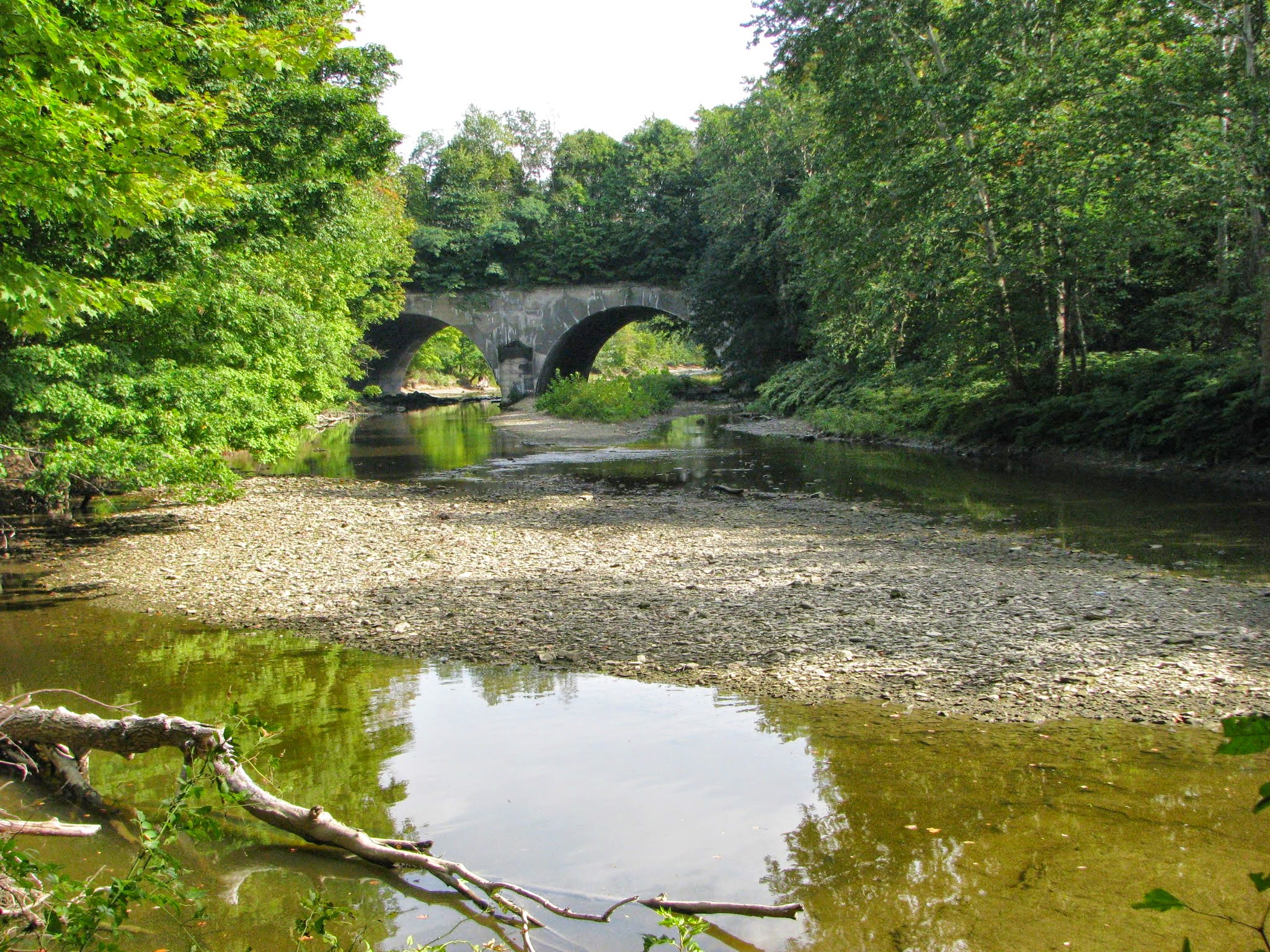
Disaster site in 2015

The crash was heard at the railroad's W. 32nd Street Station (just 100 yards (100 m) to the west of the bridge) and in the town, and the alarm was raised. Rescuers first on the scene included railroad employees, those waiting on the platform at the station, and residents of Ashtabula who lived near the bridge. The only access to the valley floor was a set of steep, narrow steps, covered in snow. Most people slid down the steep incline rather than take the steps, and several people brought axes to help free survivors.

The wooden cars burst into flame when their coal- and kerosene-fed heating stoves and oil lamps overturned. An early report said fire broke out in the Osceo and in at least three other places, and within a minute the entire wreck was ablaze. Historian Darrell E. Hamilton says the fire broke out at either end, and moved toward the middle. According to rear brakeman A.H. Stone, those still left alive in the wreckage were dead within 20 minutes. By the time rescuers reached the bridge, many wounded passengers had already made their way to the shore and the fire was burning fiercely.

The response by the Ashtabula Fire Brigade was minimal. G.W. Knapp, the city's fire chief, was an alcoholic who even when sober was slow to make decisions and easily confused. The Lake Erie Hose Company's hand- and steam-pumped horse-drawn fire engines arrived first, (Note: The volunteer Lake Erie Hose Company was a city-sponsored fire-fighting unit located on Lake Avenue and Depot Street (now W. 32nd Street), adjacent to the train depot.) but Knapp never gave any orders to fight the flames. He told a bystander that there was no use in fighting the fire, even though it was plain that some survivors were still trapped in the wreck. Railroad employees also told Knapp that his firefighters should get the wounded out and clear a pathway up the side of the ravine. (Note: The railroad's policy was to let a train burn. The policy was not made with the possibility that passengers could still be aboard.) At least one member of the town begged Knapp to put water on the flames, but he refused. Instead, the townspeople secured buckets and (with the help of some members of the fire brigade) tried to put out the blaze. The Protection Fire Company's hand-pumped engine and the Neptune Hose Company's steam-pumper (both horse-drawn) were hauled more than a mile through town to the bridge, but arrived too late to stop the spread of the fire. (Note: Both were all-volunteer fire fighting units sponsored by the city. Protection Fire was located on Main Avenue, and Neptune Hose on Center Street.)

The darkness and blinding snow made it difficult for surviving passengers to orient themselves and get out of the wreck. A number of passengers drowned in the river, while others escaped the blaze only to die of smoke inhalation.

The injured and dying were either carried up the steep steps or hauled up the incline on sleds or sleighs pulled up by rope. There was no hospital in Ashtabula. The injured were first taken to the railroad engine house, to the filthy and run-down Eagle Hotel adjacent to the station, or to the nearby Ashtabula House hotel. As these places filled, residents opened their homes to the survivors. Ambulatory injured were the last to be hauled up from the valley. By midnight, all the survivors had reached safety. The 10 doctors in the village attended to the wounded. About 1 AM, a special train arrived from Cleveland carrying railroad officials and five more surgeons.

Thieves moved among the dead and wounded, stealing money and valuables. A large crowd of the curious gathered at the wreck site the next morning, and some in the crowd looted the train until Ashtabula's mayor, H. P. Hepburn, (Note: Hepburn was an employee of the railroad, and had a serious conflict of interest in attempting to protect the railroad while also carrying out his public duties. His authority was deeply undermined by this, and his orders were disregarded, not implemented immediately, or questioned by townspeople, police, and railroad officials.) stationed a guard at the site. Some of the money and valuables were discovered following investigations by local police, and a few arrests made. Hepburn later issued a proclamation promising amnesty for anyone else who turned over stolen items. Money and valuables worth about $1,500 ($45,352 in 2025 dollars) were collected, but most of the stolen money and goods were never recovered.

The number of people killed in the Ashtabula bridge disaster will never be known. The number could be as low as 87 or as high as 200, although the official count is 92 dead. Another 64 people were injured. The number of deaths is inexact, in part because the number of passengers on the train is difficult to estimate and in part because many remains were partial (a hand, a leg, a torso). Most (although not all) remains recovered from the wreck were burned beyond recognition and could not be identified from clothing or personal items. An unknown number of the dead were essentially cremated in the blaze. Among the dead was hymn writer Philip Bliss. (Note: Some eyewitnesses alleged that Bliss survived the wreck but ran into the flames to try to save others and perished. A number of sources from the 19th century claimed Bliss tried to rush back into the flames to save his wife and children. (His children were not traveling with him.) Historians believe that all these stories are false: Bliss never made it out of the wreck alive.)

=== Identifying and burying the dead ===
Identification of the dead took a week or more. There were full or partial remains of about 36 bodies in the railroad freight house, with concerned families encouraged to come by and try to identify corpses. For several days after the wreck, townspeople and railroad employees used their hands and feet, hoes, rakes, and shovels to dig through the ash, ice, mud, and snow to find any personal items they could. These items—which included partially burned train tickets, diaries, photographs, watches, jewelry, unique or rare items of clothing, or keepsakes—were kept by the railroad. When a corpse could not be identified, grieving families sometimes were able to use these "relics" to confirm that a loved one had been aboard the train. Even so, identifying objects or papers often were separated from remains, and misidentification of remains was common.

Concerned friends and family members sent letters and telegrams in the hundreds to railroad and civic authorities, seeking knowledge of their loved ones. These contained descriptions of the alleged passenger, as well as any identifying personal effects. Some of these letters were fraudulent, sent by people seeking gold watches, jewelry, or other items as "loot". Fraudulent letters tended to be spotted fairly easily, and were not answered.

Wreck investigators were still turning up remains as late as mid-January.

A burial service for the unidentified dead was held at Ashtabula's Chestnut Grove Cemetery on January 19, 1877. (Note: Frozen ground had caused a lengthy delay before burial could occur.) A mile-long procession conveyed the dead to the cemetery. The railroad purchased a burial plot in which 18 coffins, containing the remains of an estimated 22 people, were placed.

Three coffins with three corpses remained at the freight house in the hope that they could still be identified. When these remains went unclaimed, they were buried about a week later in the same plot at Chestnut Grove.

== Investigation ==
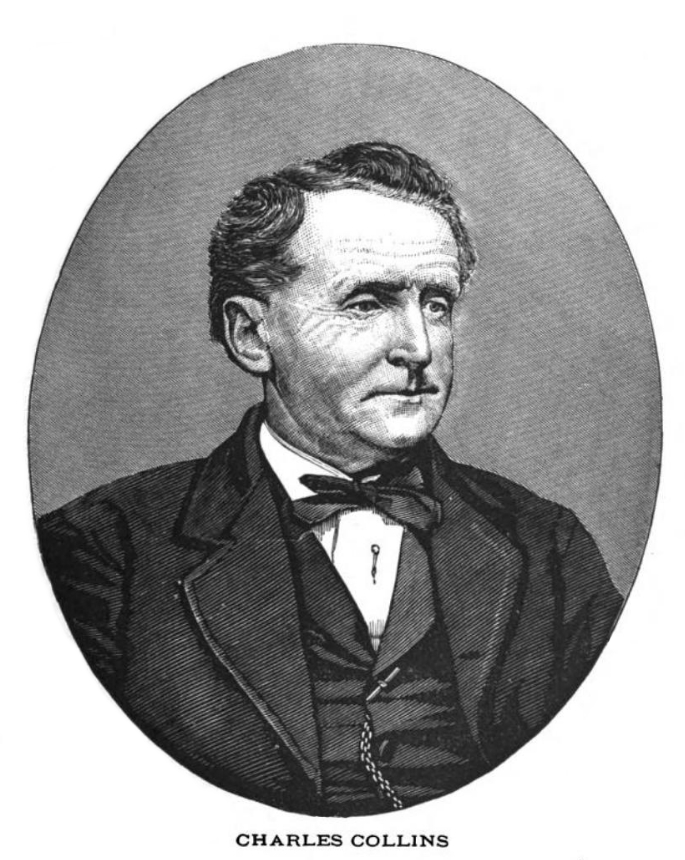
Charles Collins, the railroad's chief engineer of bridges

At dawn on December 30, Ashtabula resident Fred W. Blakeslee took photos of the wrecked bridge and train. These provide the most extensive documentation of the wreck known as of 2003.

Three investigations were made into the disaster. (Note: Because Amasa Stone used an inverted Howe truss, the upper chord was at the bottom of the bridge. This article uses the term "upper chord" to refer to the chord at the bottom of the bridge. Sources often use the term "upper chord" to refer to the chord at the top of the bridge, but this article inverts the terminology used by sources where needed for consistency's sake.)

=== Conclusions by the coroner's jury ===
There being no coroner in Ashtabula, a coroner's jury of six men from the town was convened by Justice of the Peace Edward W. Richards on December 31. The jury took testimony from 20 railroad officials and employees (including both locomotive engineers and the rear brakeman), nine members of the Ashtabula fire department, 10 residents of Ashtabula, six passengers, and eight civil engineers and bridge builders. The coroner's jury submitted its report on March 8, 1877.

The coroner's jury blamed the collapse of the Ashtabula River bridge and the deaths by fire on five factors:

1. The bridge was poorly designed. An all-iron Howe truss was unsuitable for such a long bridge. Some of the members of the chords and braces were not designed to be of sufficient strength, and were poorly placed. The lateral cross-bracing was so underdesigned as to be of little value. The angle blocks had too few and poorly designed lugs, which did not keep the braces and counter-braces from slipping out of place. (Note: The coroner's jury held that the failure of the south half-angle block at the joint between the first and second panels was where the bridge collapse began.)
2. The bridge was poorly constructed. Each member of the bridge acted independently instead of being positively connected to its neighbors. Some of the vertical posts, braces, and cross-braces were put in the wrong places. To accommodate design changes during the bridge's strengthening, the lugs on the angle blocks and the flanges on the I-beams of the chords were cut away in part, reducing their strength and effectiveness. The construction of the yokes used to bind the braces and counter-braces was poor, and shims were used to compensate for chord members which were too short. The modifications made to the bridge before its completion used thick members where thin ones were required, and thin ones where thick ones should have been used.
3. Railroad bridge inspectors did not perform their jobs adequately. Inspectors should have noted the severe deficiencies in the bridge's design and construction, and did not. They also should have observed problems with members becoming loose over time. (Note: Whether braces or counter-braces had moved or even fallen out of position was a point of dispute. Albert Howland, civil engineer hired by the joint legislative committee, said some braces had moved between 0.5 to 1.5 inches (13 to 38 mm) out of place. John D. Crehore, another civil engineer also hired by the joint committee, concluded that no braces had moved out of position since the bridge had last been painted two years earlier.)
4. The railroad failed to use self-extinguishing heating stoves, as required by state law passed on May 4, 1869.
5. The fire was worsened by the failure of those on the scene to attempt to douse the flames. The Lake Erie Hose Company's hand pump and steam pump, first on the scene, could have saved lives. The Neptune Hose Company's steam pump and the Protection Fire Company's hand pump were hauled more than 1 mile (1.6 km) through snowdrifts, but arrived too late.

Amasa Stone was held personally responsible for the bridge's poor design, and the railroad company for the lax inspection of the bridge and the failure to use self-extinguishing heating apparatus. G.W. Knapp was held personally responsible for failing to fight the fire in a timely fashion.

=== Conclusions by the state legislative joint committee ===
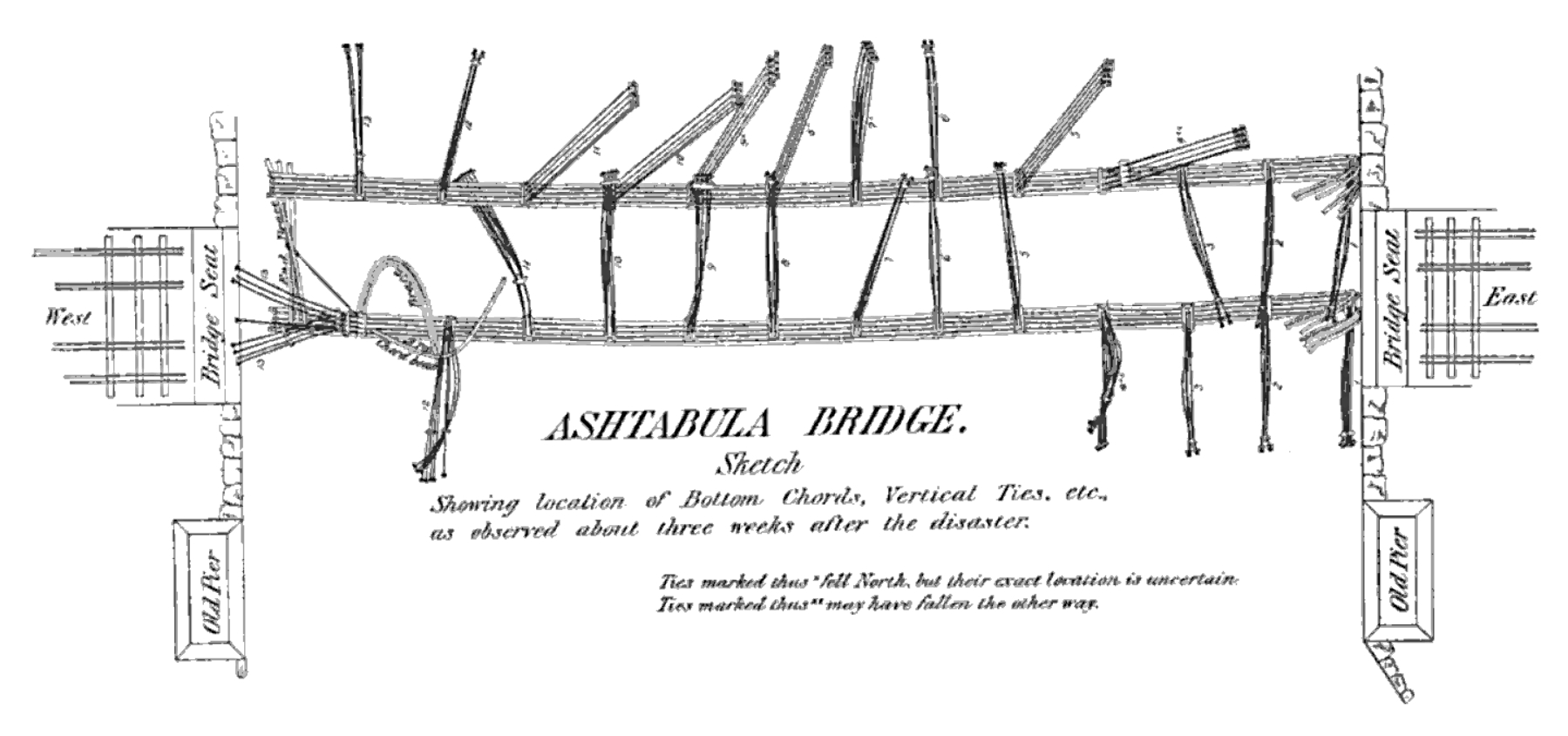
Sketch of the Ashtabula Bridge wreckage

On January 1, 1877, the Ohio General Assembly adopted a joint resolution appointing a committee to investigate the causes of the Ashtabula River bridge collapse, and to make recommendations to the legislature. The committee consisted of five members of the Ohio House of Representatives and three members of the Ohio Senate. Senator A.M. Burns chaired the committee. The joint committee hired three civil engineers (Benjamin F. Bowen, John Graham, and Thomas H. Johnson) to examine the wreckage and report to the committee regarding the bridge's design and performance. The committee also received written reports from civil engineers Albert S. Howland (Note: Howland had also testified before the coroner's jury.) and W.S. Williams, and took personal testimony from civil engineer M.J. Becker and from railroad officials and employees Amasa Stone, Charles Collins, Albert Congdon, A.L. Rogers, and Gustavus Folsom (engineer of the "Columbia"). (Note: A one-paragraph technical note, clarifying the weight of locomotives running over the bridge from its erection to its completion, was added by James Sedgley, the railroad's master mechanic.) Technical advice was provided by civil engineers D.W. Caldwell and J.E. Wright. The coroner's jury granted the joint committee full access to all of its testimony and reports as well. In appendices to its report, the joint committee printed in full the coroner's jury testimony of civil engineers A. Gottlieb, John D. Crehore, and Joseph Tomlinson.

The legislative joint committee issued its report on January 30, 1877. The committee blamed the collapse of the Ashtabula River bridge on three factors:

1. The bridge's design was flawed. Nothing in the design prevented the lateral buckling of the braces or the upper chord. (Note: The joint committee's report placed the proximate cause of the bridge's failure on buckling at the joint between the second and third panel from the west end of the bridge. However, the committee was unable to determine whether it was a chord member or brace which failed. Albert Howland, one of the civil engineers employed by the joint committee, argued that the lower chord (top of the bridge) at the joint between the second and third panels gave way. The three continuous I-beam members, he concluded buckled outward at this point.) Only a part of the upper chord was designed to transmit load to the angle blocks, and the lugs on the angle blocks were poorly designed (so that strain could not be fully transmitted to the braces and counter-braces). The bridge was apparently designed for a non-moving live load, and little evidence existed to show it was designed to accommodate jarring, oscillation, vibration, or the force of wind.
2. There were significant errors in construction. The members making up the braces were not connected to act in unison, greatly reducing the bridge's ability to carry a live load. In the lower chord, lateral braces were placed only at every other panel connection, extended across two panels (not one), and were not connected to one another where they crossed. The sway braces were too small to prevent sway, and placed only at every other panel as well. Neither the braces nor counter-braces were attached to the angle blocks, and their ends were not square.
3. The defects in design and construction could have been identified by careful inspection at any time, but the railroad's inspectors did not identify these problems. Many braces and counter-braces had fallen out of position before the bridge collapsed, something inspectors either did not notice or the railroad did not repair.

The committee found no defects in materials, and rejected the idea that application of the air brakes by the second locomotive caused the bridge to collapse.

=== Conclusions of the MacDonald investigation ===
A third investigation was conducted independently by civil engineer Charles MacDonald, who likely was commissioned to study the bridge's collapse by the American Society of Civil Engineers (ASCE).

MacDonald blamed three factors for the bridge's failure:

1. Improper inspection by railroad officials. He noted, however, that the LS&MS was not alone in infrequent inspection by largely untrained men.
2. An inadequate knowledge of the strength of iron. The whole industry suffered from a lack of this knowledge, he wrote.
3. The failure of a mis-cast lug.

MacDonald believed the bridge collapsed due to a flaw in the southernmost lug at the top of the first full angle block from the west end. He noted that the lugs atop the angle blocks on the bridge had, for some reason, been shaved down to 1.6875 inches (42.86 mm) from 2 inches (51 mm). This significantly weakened the ability of the lugs to transmit stress from the chord to the braces and counter-braces. According to his report, "The cast iron angle block at top of second set of braces had the south lug broken off close to the face, and the line of fracture disclosed an air hole extending over one half the entire section. ...[The] failure first began in the south truss, at the second panel point from the west abutment." The second full angle block "was so far impaired by an air hole as to be reduced in strength fully one half. ... At no other point were these lugs subjected to so great strain, except at the end casting and here they were heavily reinforced." This "defective detail" caused the collapse of the bridge.

=== Conclusions by the railroad ===
LS&MS president Amasa Stone categorically denied that there were any design or construction flaws. He initially blamed the bridge's collapse on the deraillment of one of the two locomotives pulling the train, or by a loose rail which caused the train's deraillment. The railroad also suggested that a tornado had hit the bridge, causing it to come loose from the abutments.

Although the LS&MS refused to accept responsibility for the disaster, it paid out more than $500,000 ($15,100,000 in 2025 dollars) to victims and their families to quiet legal claims.

== Modern engineering analysis of the disaster ==
Björn Åkesson, a civil engineer at Chalmers University of Technology in Sweden, has identified three proximate causes of the bridge collapse: (1) the failure of an angle block lug on the west end of the bridge due to fatigue (caused by bending and shear stress), (2) thrust stress from improperly fitting chords and diagonals, and (3) low temperatures, which caused the cast iron angle blocks to become brittle. The failure of the angle block caused the upper chord to buckle, and the bridge to collapse.

=== The angle block ===
The angle blocks were made of cast iron, which Åkesson says was appropriate, for the angle blocks were in compression. The vertical lugs atop the angle blocks in the upper chord of the bridge received shear stress, but this should have been minimal as shear stress was only induced by one of the adjacent members of the chord.

The critical issue, Åkesson says, is that the broken lug on the southern angle block atop the joint between the second and third panel had a void. The void itself weakened the integrity of the block. Voids also encourage the formation of large grains and can accumulate impurities like slag, both of which also increase the brittleness of iron. The void also worsened stress on the block through stress concentration effect. Gasparini and Fields conclude that this void, combined with metal fatigue, caused the lug to fail. Metal fatigue was an issue in cast and wrought iron which only a few metallurgists and engineers were aware of in the 19th century. The failure of this lug on this angle block caused the entire bridge to fail.

Neither the joint committee, nor the coroner's jury, nor any of the engineers employed by them identified the flaw in the angle block casting.

In retrospect, Gasparini and Fields say, the point where the lug transitioned to the main body of the angle block was extremely problematic. The solidification rates of the molten iron were so different, this was a likely site for the formation of cracks or voids.

=== Poor construction caused overwhelming thrust load ===
Poor construction of the bridge's diagonals worsened the stresses placed on the lugs on the angle blocks. Howe trusses rely on prestressing of braces and counter-braces to improve the way the bridge carries load. Tightening the nuts on the vertical posts (prestressing) puts the verticals in tension (stretches them). If the diagonals are already closely fitted to the angle blocks, prestressing compresses the diagonals. This allows them to carry more load. The Ashtabula Bridge diagonals, however, were only loosely fitted to the angle blocks. Prestressing brought the diagonals into a relatively close fit with the angle blocks, but did not put the diagonals in compression. The problem was worsened because shims were used to fill the space between the diagonal bearings and the angle blocks. The history of the bridge indicates that some of these shims had come loose over time and fallen away. The loss of shims induced uneven loading, as the more tightly connected diagonals absorbed load before the loose ones did. Åkesson points out that the shims themselves may even have created unequal pressure points between I-beams and the lugs, subjecting the lugs to bending forces as well as shear forces. With the diagonals not carrying the load they were intended to carry, extra stress was placed on the chords. (Note: Åkesson concludes that buckling during the removal of the falsework indicates an improper fit between the diagonals and the angle blocks, and to a lack of control over how much prestressing was actually induced.) Unequal loading of the angle blocks worsened the metal fatigue.

The construction of the upper chord of the bridge was also poor. This chord consisted of five I-beams running in parallel. Having all five members end at panel joints actually weakened a bridge, so Howe trusses were built so that three ended at one panel connection and the other two at the next panel connection. As with the connection between diagonals and angle blocks, it was critical that there be no space between the I-beams and the lugs on top of the angle block because these lugs transferred axial forces to the next member. Space between the member and lug would reduce the effectiveness of this transfer and introduce shear stress to the lug. The problems with camber led to members of the chords being shortened and the lugs being shaved down, actions which introduced space between the lugs and the chord members. (Note: Gasparini and Fields note that the alterations to the diagonal lugs and I-beams probably did lessen the strength of each diagonal. However, since Stone added more I-beams, the overall strength of the bridge was improved and the changes did not contribute to the bridge's collapse.) Construction workers used metal shims to fill the space between the lug and the chord members until a tight fit was achieved. Friction alone, rather than an active connection such as a yoke or bolt, kept the shims in place. For some years prior to the disaster, locomotive engineers reported hearing "snapping sounds" as their trains crossed the Ashtabula Bridge. This indicates that some shims had come loose and fallen off, reintroducing space between the chord members and angle block vertical lugs. This allowed members of the chord to thrust suddenly against the lugs, inducing even more metal fatigue. There is also an indication in the construction record that several chord members were misaligned. Even if their bearings had been flat, they would not have met the lugs completely. This, too, would have created uneven loading and worsened metal fatigue.

Gasparini and Fields conclude that the bridge might have survived the loss of the lug had the chords and diagonals been made stronger through active continuous connection. Active continuous connection was not used on the bridge: The members of the chords were connected to angle blocks at only every other panel, the five beams making up each chord did not have a continuous interconnection between them, (Note: The five members were held together at each panel connection by two bolts running through the web of the beams.) and the none of the parallel I-beams making up the diagonals were continuously interconnected. Åkesson points out that construction errors probably made the diagonals even less effective as thin members were placed where thicker ones should have gone and vice versa. The braces and counter-braces in a Howe truss must be the same size for the truss system to be robust and redundant. Making a brace stronger relative to a counter-brace, for example, actually reduces robustness and redundancy by changing the relative distribution of forces on the diagonals. These errors appreciably lessened the bridge's ability to withstand extra loading. Stone's strengthening of the bridge after the camber repairs also harmed the bridge's capabilities. By adding two I-beams to the end braces, Stone actually reduced the maximum stress the braces in the end panels could bear.

=== Low temperature exacerbated the flaw in the lug ===
Low temperatures the night of the disaster also worsened the metal fatigue in the already damaged lug. The role that low temperatures played in creating and worsening metal fatigue was also poorly understood in the 19th century. The temperature at the time of the accident was 16 °F (−9 °C). Cast iron is prone to fracture and fatigue cracks, and Gasparini and Fields suggest that a significant fatigue crack, originating at the void in the lug, existed at the time of the disaster, created by repeated unequal stress over the previous 11 years. The low temperatures on the night of the accident increased the brittleness of the cast iron. An existing fracture worsened in the cold and likely caused the lug's failure.

=== The issue of poor inspection ===
Modern analyzes of the bridge collapse conclude that the railway had inadequately inspected and maintained the bridge. Åkesson, however, says that better inspection of the bridge might not have prevented a collapse. An inverted Howe truss puts the superstructure below the track, where it is difficult to see and inspect, and the angle blocks were hidden by the surrounding I-beams. Better inspection might have corrected some construction errors and identified falling shims, but might not have improved the bridge's survivability.

== Legacy ==
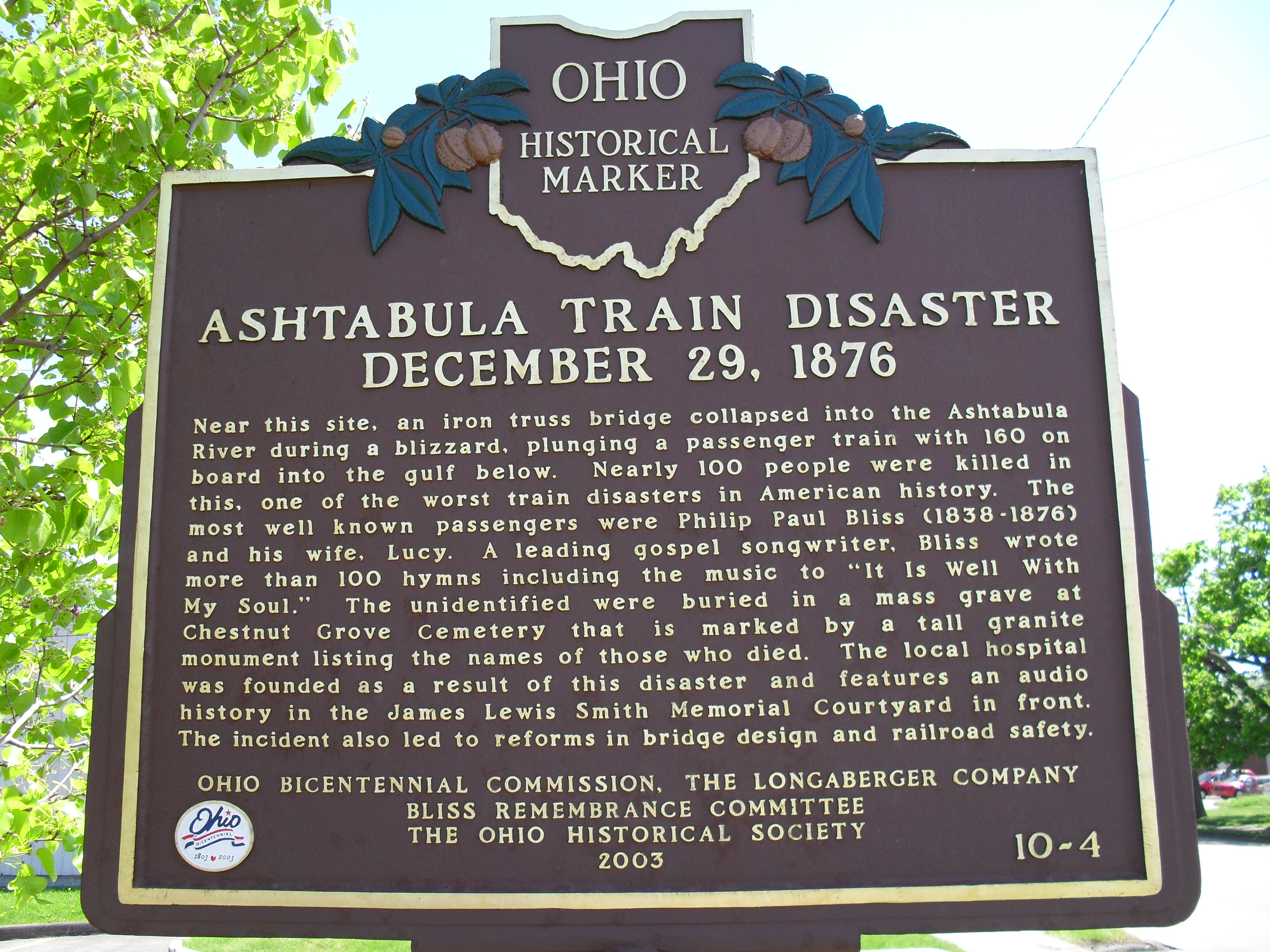
Ohio historical marker near the site of the wreck

The legislative joint committee drafted a bill that would have created Ohio's first bridge design code, required professional oversight of bridge construction, and mandated expert, frequent, regular inspections by civil engineers. The Ohio state legislature declined to act on the bill.

Concern that the city lacked medical care for the victims of the bridge disaster, citizens of Ashtabula began raising money to build a hospital in their town. An emergency care clinic opened in 1882, followed by Ashtabula General Hospital on July 1, 1904.

Several other changes were also made in the wake of the accident. Because of its low ductility, cast iron was banned by civil engineers for use in load-carrying structures soon after the accident. About 1886, steam heat was adopted by the railroad, replacing the wood and coal stoves in passenger cars. As part of the Interstate Commerce Act, a federal system was set up in 1887 to formally investigate fatal railroad accidents.

Initially, the mass grave of unidentified remains in Chestnut Grove Cemetery was unmarked. Local citizens began an effort to erect a monument on the site in 1892, and the Ashtabula Bridge Disaster Monument was dedicated on May 30, 1895, before a crowd of 5,000 people. The names of 25 individuals known to have died in the fire but whose remains could not be found are listed on a plaque on the memorial's base.

The alarm bell from the Lake Street Fire House which was used to call for help on the night of December 29 has also been preserved. It passed into private hands, but was donated to the city of Ashtabula in 1975. It is now on display in front of the city's Main Avenue fire station, accompanied by a small plaque.

Letters from concerned friends and families seeking whether loved ones had survived are archived at the Jennie Munger Gregory Memorial Museum at Geneva-on-the-Lake, Ohio.

=== Death of Charles Collins ===
Days after testifying before the state legislature committee, LS&MS chief engineer Charles Collins was found dead in his bedroom of a gunshot wound to the head. Having tendered his resignation to the railroad's board of directors the previous Monday and been refused, Collins was believed to have committed suicide out of grief and feeling partially responsible for the tragic accident.

Two official autopsies, both conducted in 1878, concluded that Collins had been murdered. For unknown reasons, law enforcement officials did not release these reports at the time. The reports were rediscovered in 2001.

Collins was buried in an elaborate mausoleum at Chestnut Grove Cemetery.

== See also ==
- Forest Hills disaster, another railroad bridge collapse stemming from poor design
- List of structural failures and collapses
- List of bridge disasters
- List of wind-related railway accidents

== Bibliography ==
- Åkesson, Björn (2008). Understanding Bridge Collapses. London: Taylor & Francis. ISBN 9780415436236.
- Ashcroft, John (1865). Ashcroft's Railway Directory for 1865. New York: John Ashcroft. hdl:2027/njp.32101066799063.
- Bellamy, John Stark (2009). Cleveland's Greatest Disasters! 16 Tragic True Tales of Death and Destruction: An Anthology. Cleveland: Gray & Co. ISBN 9781598510584.
- Bianculli, Anthony J. (2003). Trains and Technology. Volume 4: Bridges and Tunnels, Signals. Newark, Del.: University of Delaware Press. ISBN 9780874138030.
- Borsvold, David (2003). Ashtabula. Charleston, S.C.: Arcadia Publishing. ISBN 9780738523118.
- Brockmann, R. John (2005). Twisted Rails, Sunken Ships: The Rhetoric of Nineteenth Century Steamboat and Railroad Accident Investigation Reports, 1833–1879. Amityville, N.Y.: Baywood Publishing Co. ISBN 9780895032911.
- Boyer, Dwight (1977). Ships and Men of the Great Lakes. New York: Dodd, Mead. ISBN 9780396074465.
- Campbell, Ballard C. (2008). Disasters, Accidents, and Crises in American History: A Reference Guide to the Nation's Most Catastrophic Events. New York: Facts on File. ISBN 9780816066032.
- Corts, Thomas E. (2003). "Appendices". In Corts, Thomas E. (ed.). Bliss and Tragedy: The Ashtabula Railway-Bridge Accident of 1876 and the Loss of P. P. Bliss. Birmingham, Ala.: Sherman Oak Books. ISBN 9781931985093.
- Corts, Thomas E. (2003). "The Loss of Bliss in Ashtabula". In Corts, Thomas E. (ed.). Bliss and Tragedy: The Ashtabula Railway-Bridge Accident of 1876 and the Loss of P.P. Bliss. Birmingham, Ala.: Sherman Oak Books. ISBN 9781931985093.
- Fess, Simeon David (1937). Ohio: A Four-Volume Reference Library on the History of a Great State. Volume 3: Historical Gazetteer of Ohio. Chicago: Lewis Publishing Co. OCLC 418516.
- Dutka, Alan F. (2015). Misfortune on Cleveland's Millionaires' Row. Charleston, S.C.: The History Press. ISBN 9781467117982.
- Gasparini, Dario A.; Fields, Melissa (May 1993). "Collapse of Ashtabula Bridge on December 29, 1876". Journal of Performance of Constructed Facilities. 7 (2): 109–125. doi:10.1061/(ASCE)0887-3828(1993)7:2(109). ISSN 0887-3828.
- Griswold, Wesley S. (1969). Train wreck!. Brattleboro, Vt.: Greene Press. ISBN 9780828900997.
- Hamilton, Barbara J. (2003). "Who's Who?: Identifying Victims of the Disaster". In Corts, Thomas E. (ed.). Bliss and Tragedy: The Ashtabula Railway-Bridge Accident of 1876 and the Loss of P.P. Bliss. Birmingham, Ala.: Sherman Oak Books. ISBN 9781931985093.
- Hamilton, Darrell E. (2003). "Almost the Perfect Disaster". In Corts, Thomas E. (ed.). Bliss and Tragedy: The Ashtabula Railway-Bridge Accident of 1876 and the Loss of P.P. Bliss. Birmingham, Ala.: Sherman Oak Books. ISBN 9781931985093.
- Holbrook, Stewart H. (1947). The Story of American Railroads. New York: Crown Publishers.
- Johnson, Eric A. (2006). Ashtabula Firefighting. Charleston, S.C.: Arcadia Publishing. ISBN 9780738540474.
- Joint Committee Concerning the Ashtabula Bridge Disaster (1877). Report of the Joint Committee Concerning the Ashtabula Bridge Disaster Under Joint Resolution of the General Assembly. Journal of the House of Representatives of the State of Ohio, for the Adjourned Session of the Sixty-Second General Assembly. Volume LXXIII. Springfield, Ohio: Elifritz & Winters.
- Kitchenside, Geoffrey (1997). Great Train Disasters: The World's Worst Railway Accidents. Avonmouth, Bristol, UK: Parragon Plus. ISBN 9780752526300.
- MacDonald, Charles (1877). The Failure of the Ashtabula Bridge. New York: American Society of Civil Engineers. hdl:2027/uc1.31210023545609.
- McLellan, David; Warrick, Bill (1989). The Lake Shore & Michigan Southern Railway. Polo, Ill.: Transportation Trails. ISBN 9780933449091.
- Nash, Jay Robert (1976). Darkest Hours: A Narrative Encyclopedia of Worldwide Disasters From Ancient Times to the Present. Chicago: Nelson-Hall. ISBN 9780882291406.
- Ohio Commissioner of Railroads and Telegraphs (1868). Annual Report of the Commissioner of Railroads and Telegraphs of the State of Ohio, With Tabulations and Deductions From Reports of the Railroad Corporations of the State, for the Year Ending June 30, 1868. Columbus, Ohio: Columbus Printing Company, State Printers. hdl:2027/uc1.b2896930.
- Ohio Commissioner of Railroads and Telegraphs (1874). Seventh Annual Report of the Commissioner of Railroads and Telegraphs of Ohio for the Year Ending June 30, 1873. Columbus, Ohio: Nevins and Myers, State Printers.
- Orth, Samuel Peter (1910). A History of Cleveland, Ohio. Volume I. Chicago: S.J. Clarke Publishing Co.
- Peet, Stephen Denison (1877). The Ashtabula Disaster. Chicago: J.S. Goodman – Louis Lloyd & Co.
- Reed, Robert C. (1968). Train Wrecks: A Pictorial History of Accidents on the Main Line. New York: Bonanza Books. OCLC 49730574.
- Rogers, A.L. (1877). "Testimony of A.L. Rogers". Journal of the House of Representatives of the State of Ohio, for the Adjourned Session of the Sixty-Second General Assembly. Volume LXXIII. Springfield, Ohio: Elifritz & Winters.
- Rose, William Ganson (1990). Cleveland: The Making of a City. Kent, Ohio: Kent State University Press. ISBN 9780873384285.
- Stone, Amasa (1877). "Testimony of Amasa Stone". Journal of the House of Representatives of the State of Ohio, for the Adjourned Session of the Sixty-Second General Assembly. Volume LXXIII. Springfield, Ohio: Elifritz & Winters.
- "Travelers' Official Railway Guide for the United States and Canada". Travelers' Official Guide of the Railway and Steam Navigation Lines in the United States and Canada. Philadelphia: National General Ticket Agents' Association. June 1870. hdl:2027/mdp.39015076287575.
