= Clarence Leonard Hay =

American archaeologist

- Born: December 19, 1884; Cleveland, Ohio
- Died: June 4, 1969 (aged 84); Paris, France
- Education: Westminster School; Harvard University
- Alma mater: Harvard University
- Occupation: Archaeologist
- Employer: American Museum of Natural History

Clarence Leonard Hay (December 19, 1884 – June 4, 1969) was an American archaeologist who worked as a curator for the American Museum of Natural History in New York City. His work focused on the people and cultures of Mexico and Central America, particularly the Maya civilization.

Hays most notable archaeology discovery was the Río Bec B, a pre-Columbian Maya archaeological site, which he found with Raymond Mervin in 1912. The site was later forgotten and lost, and was rediscovered 60 years later by a film crew, who were scouting locations in the Yucatan for a documentary.

== Biography and education ==
Clarence Leonard Hay was born on December 19, 1884, in Cleveland, Ohio. His father John Hay, was a private secretary and an assistant for Abraham Lincoln, who also served as United States Secretary of State under Presidents William McKinley and Theodore Roosevelt. His mother was Clara Louise Hay (née Stone), daughter of Cleveland multimillionaire railroad and banking mogul Amasa Stone. He was named in honor of the American geologist and author Clarence King.

Hay attended Westminster School, before graduating from Harvard University in 1908 with a bachelor of arts degree. In 1911, he earned a masters of arts degree while working with the Peabody Museum of Archaeology and Ethnology. While at Harvard, he was a member of the Hasty Pudding Club, writing a play for the social club his senior year.

== Career and travels ==
In 1908, after graduation from Harvard, he accompanied Archibald Coolidge to Spain as his private secretary, where they attended the International Historical Congress in Zaragoza. The pair then traveled to Santiago, Chile, where Coolidge was a delegate at the First Pan-American Scientific Congress. In 1909, he accompanied Hiram Bingham to Peru and they explored the ruins of Machu Picchu. Hay then returned to Harvard to obtain his masters. In 1912, he traveled to the Yucatan with Raymond Mervin and discovered numerous Mayan ruins; the most significant one being Río Bec B, a pre-Columbian Maya archaeological site, which was later forgotten and lost.

It seems strange that a large temple ruin should disappear so utterly in a rather small and well defined section, but only one who has visited that part of Mexico can possibly visualize the density of the jungle, it is perfectly possible to pass within arm's length of the ruin without being able to see it. As a matter of fact, we only found it by running right into it.
Hays (June 1935)

In 1935, Hays wrote about the discovery of Río Bec B for the museum's journal, in an article titled A Contribution to Maya Architecture. The article featured several photographs that Hays had taken during the expedition. Hay’s publication in 1935 was the last first-hand report on the discovery. For 60 years, the site was lost, until 1973, when filmmakers Hugh and Suzanne Johnston rediscovered it during an expedition into the overgrown jungles of Yucatan, for a documentary they were preparing to film for WNET. There were no archaeological investigations performed during their trip, and the ruins were partially cleared and then filmed for the documentary titled Mystery of the Maya, which was broadcast in 1974 on WNET.A review of the documentary in Archaeology magazine opined that the "film was disappointing", because of the "film maker's condescending attitude toward the viewer and from a strategic underestimation of the material's intrinsic value." They also noted how the "archaeologist's names are glossed over."

In 1914, on an expedition to Mexico, Hay along with 150 other Americans were trapped in Veracruz, during the Mexican Revolution. American marines eventually rescued them. During World War I, Hay served in the United States Army from 1917 to 1919, working with Army Intelligence. After returning from the war, Hay began his career at the Museum of Natural History in New York City in 1921 working as a research associate in Mexican and Central American Archeology. He was elected a trustee of the museum in 1924, and elected as secretary of the board of trustees in 1931. He held that post for 23 years, finally being elected as an honorary trustee in 1954. His work focused on the people and cultures of Mexico and Central America, particularly Mayan civilization.

== Lincoln artifacts ==
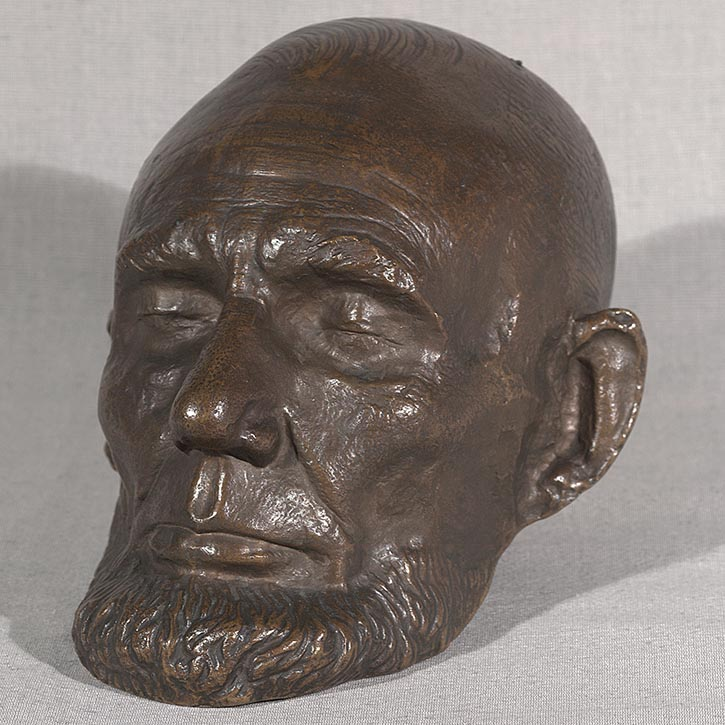
Bronze mask of Lincoln by Mills, located in the Rare Book and Special Collections Division, Library of Congress.

Hay owned several artifacts of Abraham Lincoln that he inherited from his father, and later donated to the Library of Congress. In December 1916, Hay donated the original draft of Abraham Lincoln's second inaugural address, and his two drafts of the Gettysburg Address to the Library of Congress. Hay also owned a bronze mask of Lincoln sculpted by Clark Mills. The bronze was cast from the last mold ever made of Lincoln's face, approximately two months before the assassination of Lincoln. The bronze was put on display at the American Museum of Natural History during the month of February each year from 1953 to 1968.

The cast had been kept by Mills sons until 1886, when it was given to Hays father. In 1965, Hay donated the bronze to the Library of Congress. John Hay wrote in 1890 that "the nose is thin, and lengthened by the emaciation of the cheeks; the mouth is fixed like that of an archaic statue; a look as of one whom sorrow and care had done their worst without victory ... the whole expression is of unspeakable sadness and all-sufficing strength."

== Publications ==
Hay is the editor of The Maya and Their Neighbors: Essays on Middle American Anthropology and Archaeology. In 1916, he wrote an introduction to his father's republished book, The Bread-Winners, an 1883 novel that had previously been published anonymously. In 1907, with the permission of his mother Clara Hay, his father was officially acknowledged as the author. Hay also collected an anthology of his father's poems, The Complete Poetical Works of John Hay, and had them published in 1916 as well. In the introduction to the book, he wrote that his father "was by inclination an author, he loved to write, and wrote easily, his diplomatic career he considered an accident, or rather a chapter of accidents."

== Personal life ==
Hay married Alice Appleton, daughter of Francis R. Appleton, on August 5, 1914. The couple had two children. Hay died aged 84 in Paris, France on June 4, 1969. His estate was valued at $7 million and was left to his wife and two children. Hay was active in several organizations during his life including, the New York Academy of Sciences, American Ethnological Society, Harvard Club of New York City, and the American Geographical Society. Hay also consulted with the New York City Police Department's bomb squad.

== See also ==
- Anthropology
- Harvard College social clubs
- List of archaeologists
- List of archaeological sites by country
