= Amasa Stone =

American industrialist

Amasa Stone, Jr.
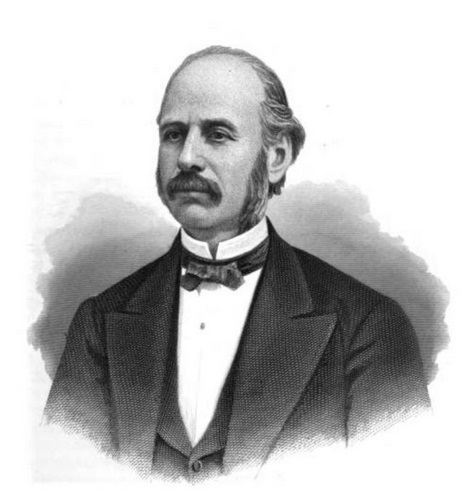
- Amasa Stone
- Born: April 27, 1818; Charlton, Massachusetts, U.S.
- Died: May 11, 1883 (aged 65); Cleveland, Ohio, U.S.
- Occupations: Bridge builder, railroad executive, businessman
- Known for: Philanthropy
- Spouse: Julia Ann Gleason
- Children: 3, including Flora Amelia
- Relatives: Helen Hay Whitney (granddaughter)

Signature
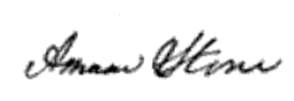

Amasa Stone, Jr. (April 27, 1818 – May 11, 1883) was an American industrialist who is best remembered for having created a regional railroad empire centered in the U.S. state of Ohio from 1860 to 1883. He gained fame in New England in the 1840s for building hundreds of bridges, most of them Howe truss bridges (the patent for which he had licensed from its inventor). After moving into railroad construction in 1848, Stone moved to Cleveland, Ohio, in 1850. Within four years he was a director of the Cleveland, Columbus and Cincinnati Railroad and the Cleveland, Painesville and Ashtabula Railroad. The latter merged with the Lake Shore and Michigan Southern Railway, of which Stone was appointed director. Stone was also a director or president of numerous railroads in Ohio, New York, Pennsylvania, Indiana, Illinois, Iowa, and Michigan.

Stone played a critical role in helping the Standard Oil company form its monopoly, and he was a major force in the Cleveland banking, steel, and iron industries. Stone's reputation was significantly tarnished after the Ashtabula River railroad bridge, which he designed and constructed, collapsed in 1876 in the Ashtabula River railroad disaster. Stone spent many of his last years engaging in major charitable endeavors. Among the most prominent was his gift which allowed Western Reserve College (later known as Case Western Reserve University) to relocate from Hudson, Ohio, to Cleveland.

== Early life ==
Amasa Stone, Jr. was born on April 27, 1818, on a farm near Charlton, Massachusetts, to Amasa and Esther (née Boyden) Stone. He was the ninth of 10 children, and the third of four sons. His ancestor, Gregory Stone, a yeoman, had emigrated from Ipswich in Suffolk, England, to Massachusetts in 1635 as part of the Puritan migration to New England. His great-grandfather, Jonathan Stone, fought at the Battle of Lexington on April 19, 1775, and in the subsequent American Revolutionary War.

Stone worked on the family farm during the growing and harvest seasons, and attended local public schools when not engaged in agricultural labor. At the age of 17, Stone left the farm and moved to Worcester, Massachusetts, where he apprenticed as a carpenter and builder with his older brother. Physically very strong, he swiftly advanced in his trade. Before he was 21 years old, he rose to the role of foreman, and had supervised the erection of several homes in the area as well as a church in East Brookfield.

== Fame as a bridge builder ==
Amasa Stone began working for his brother-in-law, William Howe, in 1839. The following year, Howe was engaged to build a railroad bridge over the Connecticut River in Springfield, Massachusetts. This famous bridge was of a new, influential design—the Howe truss bridge. Howe patented the design in 1840. (Note: William Howe's nephew, Elias Howe, Jr., patented the first viable sewing machine. William's brother, Tyler Howe, invented the box spring bed.) With the financial support of Azariah Boody, a Springfield businessman, Stone purchased for $40,000 ($1,290,000 in 2025 dollars) the rights to Howe's patented bridge design in 1842. (Note: The rights to the patent extended to bridges and structures erected only in New England.) That same year, the two men formed a bridge-building firm, Boody, Stone & Co., which erected a large number of Howe truss bridges throughout New England.

Stone was named construction superintendent of the newly formed New Haven, Hartford & Springfield Railroad (NHH&S) in 1845. (Note: The company had been formed by the merger of the Hartford and New Haven Railroad (chartered in 1833) and the Hartford and Springfield Railroad (chartered in 1839).) The demands of his construction business forced him to resign his railroad position in 1846. But later that same year, the NHH&S's bridge over the Connecticut River at Enfield Falls (near Springfield) washed out. This bridge carried much of the railroad's traffic, and its quick reconstruction was urgent. The railroad contracted with Stone to rebuild the bridge, which was 0.25-mile (0.40 km) long. Stone completed the work in just 40 days, much less time than most engineers believed possible. He later considered this remarkable feat the major accomplishment of his construction career. The railroad gave him $1,000 ($35,833 in 2025 dollars) as a bonus in gratitude.

Stone dissolved Boody, Stone & Co. in late 1846 or early 1847. With Howe's business partner, Daniel L. Harris, he purchased the Howe Bridge Works (founded in 1840 by William Howe). This firm continued to construct bridges in Connecticut, Massachusetts, and Rhode Island until 1849.

By the time he resettled in Cleveland, Ohio, in 1850, Stone was known as the most eminent bridge builder and railroad contractor in New England.

== Cleveland railroading ==
=== The CC&C and LS&MS ===
The Cleveland, Columbus and Cincinnati Railroad (CC&C) was chartered in 1836. After several false starts at construction, in November 1848 the company finally issued a request for proposals to build the first leg of the line from Cleveland to Columbus, Ohio. Frederick Harbach, a surveyor and engineer for several Ohio railroads, surveyed the route for the new spur in 1847. Stone had worked with Harbach and another railroad engineer, Stillman Witt, while building railroad bridges in New England. Alfred Kelley, an attorney and former state legislator, canal commissioner, banker, and railroad builder, was president of the railway, and he, too, knew Stone well from his railroading days in the east. Kelley and the CC&C managers reached out to Stone, Harbach, and Witt, and asked them to bid on the project. Stone, Harbach, and Witt formed a company in late 1848 to bid on the contract, which they then won. Construction began on the line in November 1849, and the final spike was driven on February 18, 1851. Stone, Harbach, and Witt agreed to take a portion of their pay in the form of stock in the railroad. The stock soared in value as soon as the spur was completed, making Stone very wealthy.

In 1849, Stone, Harbach, and Witt also won a contract to build the Bellefontaine and Indiana Railroad. The Indiana portion of the line was finished in 1852, and the Ohio portion in July 1853.

In 1850, Stone was appointed construction superintendent of the CC&C, and he moved to Cleveland. He was named a director of the railroad in 1852. (Note: He appears to have remained a director of the railroad until its merger with the Bellefontaine Railway in May 1868: He was a director in 1856, 1861, 1864, 1867, and 1868. The CC&C merged with the Bellefontaine Railway—a successor to the Bellefontaine and Indiana Railroad—to form the Cleveland, Columbus, Cincinnati and Indianapolis Railway on May 16, 1868.)

Stone also became construction superintendent of another railroad in 1850, one that would eventually be known as the Lake Shore and Michigan Southern Railway (LS&MS). The line began in 1833 as a series of small, independent railroads which then combined into larger and larger companies. (Note: On April 12, 1842, the Erie and North East Railroad was chartered by the state of Pennsylvania to build a line from Erie, Pennsylvania, east to the border with New York. On May 21, 1844, the Franklin Canal Company was chartered to build a railroad from Erie to the Ohio border. In October 1849, the Buffalo and State Line Railroad was chartered by the state of New York to build a line from Buffalo, New York, west to the border with Pennsylvania. On February 18, 1848, the Cleveland, Painesville and Ashtabula Railroad was chartered to build a line from Cleveland to join the Franklin Canal line. The Erie & Northeast and the Buffalo & State Line merged on March 9, 1867, to form the Buffalo and Erie Railroad. The Cleveland, Painesville & Ashtabula leased the Cleveland & Toledo Railroad in October 1867, and the CP&A changed its name to the Lake Shore Railway on March 31, 1868. The Lake Shore absorbed the Cleveland and Toledo on February 11, 1869. On April 6, 1869, the Michigan Southern & Northern Indiana Railroad and the Lake Shore Railway merged to form the Lake Shore and Michigan Southern Railway. The Lake Shore absorbed the Buffalo and Erie Railroad on June 22, 1869.) One of the first of these smaller lines was the Cleveland, Painesville and Ashtabula Railroad (CP&A), which had been chartered in 1848 to build track from Cleveland to the border with Pennsylvania. Alfred Kelley was one of its directors. On July 26, 1850, the CP&A awarded a contract to build its 95-mile (153 km) line to the firm of Stone, Harbach, and Witt. The line was completed in autumn 1852, and Stone was named a director of the railroad in August 1853 at a salary of $4,000 a year ($154,800 in 2025 dollars). He continued in this position until the corporation's merger into the LS&MS in May 1869, and served as the CP&A's president from August 1858 to March 1859. While Stone served as director, the CP&A leased the Jamestown and Franklin Railroad (J&FR) in March 1864 for 20 years. He oversaw the construction of the Union Depot (named because all railroads in the city would use the same station) in Erie, Pennsylvania, in 1866, and became a director of the J&FR (probably for a single year) in 1868. Stone was again elected a director of the LS&MS in August 1869, and was appointed the LS&MS' general manager in July 1873 (serving until June 1875). The railroad was in financial difficulty by mid-1873, and Stone's appointment was made in large part so that he could stabilize it. Just one month after Stone took over as general manager, he learned that the 1873 dividend (which cost $2 million) had been paid for with a loan from the Union Trust Company (a Cleveland bank). When the economy soured in August, the bank called the loan. The LS&MS almost went into receivership, but Cornelius Vanderbilt (another director of the road) repaid the loan out of his own funds. When his health failed in 1875, Stone resigned his position as director and general manager.

Stone remained construction superintendent of the CP&A until July 1853, and of the CC&C until 1854, when he resigned both offices (retaining his directorships) due to poor health. The following year, Stone and Witt signed a contract to clear and grade the 44.6-mile (71.8 km) Chicago and Milwaukee Railway from Waukegan, Illinois, to the border with Wisconsin. He and Witt then signed a second contract in 1858 to build the track.

Stone added another important railroad executive position when he became director of the Cleveland and Toledo Railroad (Note: The Junction Railroad was chartered March 2, 1846. Its line was intended to run from Toledo to Cleveland. The Toledo, Norwalk and Cleveland Railroad was chartered March 7, 1850. Its line was intended to run from Toledo to Grafton, Ohio (southwest of Cleveland) and connect with the CC&C. The Toledo, Norwalk & Cleveland opened on January 24, 1853, and the two railroads merged on September 1, 1853.) in June 1859. Directorships for the road lasted a year, and Stone served one term. He was elected again in June 1863 and June 1867, and served as the company's president from January to June 1868. During his last term as director of the line (and while serving as a director of the CP&A), the CP&A leased the Cleveland & Toledo for 99 years on October 8, 1867, essentially running the railroad. On June 17, 1868, the CP&A changed its name to the Lake Shore Railway, and absorbed the Cleveland & Toledo on February 11, 1869.

=== Civil War ===
During the American Civil War (1861 to 1864), Stone focused almost all his attention on running his railroads for the benefit of the Union war effort, and became a millionaire. He was an ardent supporter of President Abraham Lincoln, and Lincoln consulted with him on both supply and transportation issues. He became a friend of Lincoln's, and raised and supplied troops for Union cause. In 1863, Lincoln offered Stone a brigadier generalship if he would construct a military railway from Kentucky to Knoxville, Tennessee. Stone turned down the generalship and persuaded the president to abandon the project (which was unfeasible and unnecessary). It was probably while visiting Washington, D.C., during a trip to visit Lincoln that Stone met and became friends with Lincoln's private secretary, John Hay.

It became clear during the Civil War that Cleveland's lone railroad station—a small wooden structure built in 1853 at the base of Bath Street (now Front Avenue) on the Cleveland Flats—was not large enough to handle the city's growing rail needs. The station burned to the ground in 1864, and Amasa Stone was tapped by the railroads to build a new station. Stone both designed and oversaw the construction of the luxurious and large Cleveland Union Depot, which opened on November 10, 1866.

By 1868, Stone's annual income had risen to $70,000 a year ($1,814,063 in 2025 dollars), and a few years later he owned property worth at least $5 million ($146,590,909 in 2025 dollars).

=== Association with Cornelius Vanderbilt ===
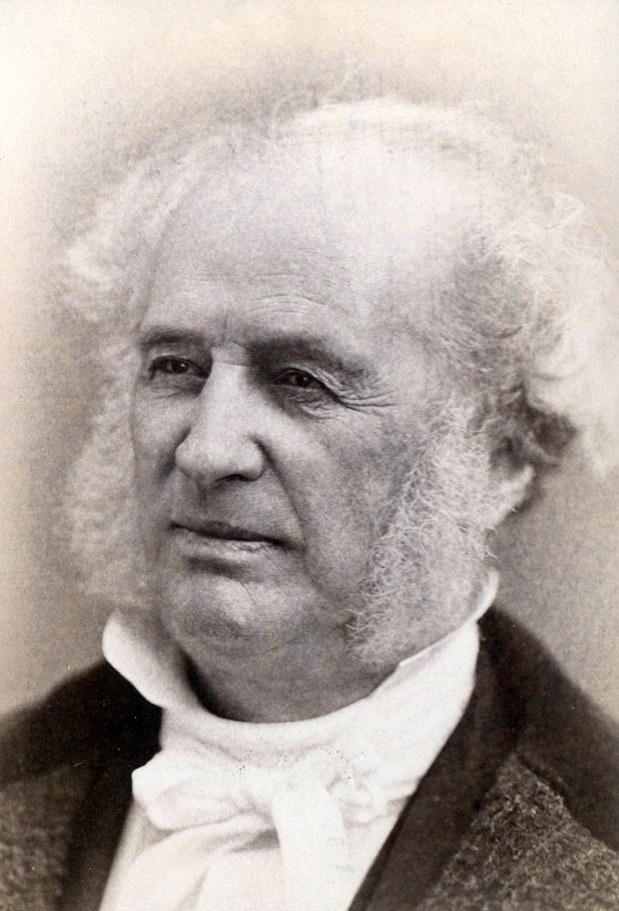
Cornelius Vanderbilt.

Cornelius Vanderbilt waged a long and bitter war for control of the New York Central Railroad from 1865 to 1867. The Central, governed by a clique of men known as the "Albany Regency", controlled most of the rail traffic outside of New York City. But Vanderbilt's Hudson River Railroad not only had the only direct link between Albany, New York, and New York City, but it also had the only rail line into lower Manhattan. Vanderbilt won an agreement with the Central to transfer freight to his line. The contract also required the Central to pay the Hudson River Railroad $100,000 a year ($2,058,511 in 2025 dollars) for keeping extra rolling stock on hand in the summer to handle the increased traffic moving north. A group of New York City investors—led by banker LeGrand Lockwood, American Express and Wells Fargo founder William Fargo, and Michigan Southern and Northern Indiana Railroad president Henry Keep—decided to seek control of the Central. They quickly amassed almost two-thirds of the company's stock, and ousted the "Albany Regency". Keep, elected president of the Central, immediately revoked the yearly payment. An outraged Vanderbilt stopped carrying all Central freight. Steamboats could not move the Central's cargoes because the Hudson River frozen due to a harsh winter. Freight backed up in Albany, and New York City was effectively cut off by rail. The Central's stock price fell. In an attempt to make money off the situation, Keep borrowed a significant amount of shares to sell short. Flooding the market with shares only drove the price further downward, and Vanderbilt and his allies quickly purchased these shares. This forced Keep to pay his lenders out of his own pocket, hurting him financially, and allowed the Vanderbilt group to gain control of the Central. Keep resigned, and Horace Henry Baxter was named president in December 1866. Vanderbilt exerted his power again in December 1867, and had himself named president of the Central.

Realizing that the New York Central now depended heavily on connecting lines to reach Midwestern cities like Chicago, Cleveland, Detroit, and St. Louis, Vanderbilt decided to add Amasa Stone to the Central's board of directors. Stone was first appointed to the board in 1867, and probably served until December 1868. (Note: Stone's health was poor after his 1867 carriage accident, and he spent beginning in January 1869 he spent 13 months in Europe traveling and resting. He was no longer on the board in 1872 or 1873.) In April 1868, Stone played a major role in bringing together Cornelius Vanderbilt and the oil magnate John D. Rockefeller. Vanderbilt very much wanted the New York Central to carry both raw and refined oil being shipped by Rockefeller. On April 18, 1868, Vanderbilt asked Rockefeller (then visiting New York City) to meet with him. Rockefeller refused, sending only his business card. He believed Vanderbilt would try to charge him high freightage rates, and Rockefeller knew he could get his oil to refineries and consumers without Vanderbilt. Vanderbilt persisted, however, and later that afternoon sent Amasa Stone to visit Rockefeller at Rockefeller's hotel. The two Clevelanders spoke for several hours, and Stone convinced Rockefeller to see Vanderbilt. The two men met that evening, and began a long and fruitful business relationship.

Vanderbilt subsequently played another critical role on Amasa Stone's railroad career. Vanderbilt wanted control of the Lake Shore Railway, which had formed out of a combination of smaller Ohio, Indiana, and Illinois railroads on March 31, 1868. In May 1868, Vanderbilt's proxies attended the first Lake Shore stockholders' meeting, and discovered that LeGrand Lockwood had a sizeable financial interest in the company. Vanderbilt was defeated in his attempt to install his own man as the Lake Shore's president. During the next several months, Lockwood worked with investor and robber baron Jay Gould, who was engaged in the Erie War for control of the Erie Railroad and wanted to divert all Lake Shore traffic to the Erie. On August 19, 1869, Lockwood and Gould rammed their plan through the Lake Shore's board of directors. Vanderbilt fought them, but his only victory was in securing the election of Amasa Stone to the Lake Shore's board. Stone served until his health failed again in 1875, when he resigned.

Stone's usefulness to Vanderbilt was soon interrupted, however. On October 18, 1867, Stone and J.C. Buell, the cashier of Cleveland's Second National Bank, were hurled from their carriage after it came apart after hitting an open gutter in Cleveland's Public Square. Stone was severely injured, and walked with a strong limp for the rest of his life. Stone went with his family to Europe to recuperate in 1868, and spent 13 months abroad. It was the first of two lengthy trips abroad for him.

=== LS&MS again, and other post-war railroad career ===
Amasa Stone had a wide range of railroad interests throughout the Midwest in the late 1860s and into the early 1880s. In 1868, he and Hiram Garrettson, Jeptha Wade, and Stillman Witt invested in and constructed the Cleveland and Newburgh Railroad. This steam streetcar line cost $68,000 ($1,644,750 in 2025 dollars) to build, and ran for 3.3 miles (5.3 km) down Willson Avenue (now East 55th Street) and then Kinsman Road to Newburgh (now the South Broadway neighborhood). It went bankrupt in 1878.

On July 2, 1870, the Lake Shore and Tuscarawas Valley Railway (LS&TV) was incorporated to build a railroad from Berea, Ohio, to Mill Township in Tuscarawas County, Ohio, where it would join the Pittsburgh, Cincinnati, Chicago and St. Louis Railroad line. A branch to Elyria, Ohio, was also authorized. In February 1871, Stone was among several men appointed to investigate the feasibility of constructing the line. Construction began, but the LS&TV fell into receivership in July 1874 for failing to pay the mortgage on another railroad it had acquired, and on January 30, 1875, Stone and four other investors formed the Cleveland, Tuscarawas Valley and Wheeling Railway (CTV&W) to take over the assets of the LS&TV. Stone was named a director of the CTV&W in 1877, serving until 1882. The CTV&W once again fell into receivership in February 1883. After a Cleveland investor purchased it, it was sold to yet another investors' group—once again led by Stone—which filed a charter on March 1, 1883, to incorporate the Cleveland, Lorain and Wheeling Railway (CL&W), which assumed the assets of the CTV&W. As before, Stone was named a director of this new road.

In 1870, at the conclusion of his 13-month trip to Europe, Stone once more was elected a director of the LS&MS. He retained this position in 1871, 1872, 1873, 1874, 1875, 1876, and 1879. Cornelius Vanderbilt became president of the Lake Shore in July 1873, and asked Stone to become managing director and de facto president of the railroad. Stone was managing director of the line in 1873, 1874, and 1875. The interruption in his directorship and the termination of his position as managing director occurred after he resigned due to ill health in June 1875 to go abroad for 18 months.

In 1871 and 1872, Stone was named a director of the Toledo, Wabash and Western Railway (TW&W). This road had formed in 1865 when the Toledo and Wabash Railway, Great Western Railway of Illinois, the Illinois and Southern Iowa Railroad, the Quincy and Toledo Railroad, and the Warsaw and Peoria Railroad merged. Cornelius Vanderbilt picked up large blocs of stock in the road as part of the Erie War, and the TW&W and LS&MS had effectively agreed to merge in 1869. Vanderbilt subsequently installed his strongest business associates as directors of the TW&W, which explains Stone's appointment.

Beginning in 1872, Stone played a role on three Michigan railroads as well. The first was the Northern Central Michigan Railroad, whose stock was purchased by the LS&MS in 1871. The LS&MS operated the road, and installed its own directors as directors and officers of the North Central. Beginning in 1872 and lasting to the end of 1876, Stone was a director of this road. He left the board after 1876 due to his 18-month trip in Europe. Similarly, the LS&MS purchased all the stock in and operated the Detroit, Monroe and Toledo Railroad. Stone was a director and president of this road without interruption from 1872 to his death in 1883. Finally, the LS&MS also purchased and operated the Kalamazoo and White Pigeon Railroad. Stone was a director of this road without interruption from 1872 to his death in 1883.

Beginning in 1873, Stone began playing a major role in the Mahoning Coal Railroad (MCR). The company incorporated in 1871 to build a line from Youngstown, Ohio (the location of a burgeoning steel industry) to Brookfield Township in Trumbull County, Ohio. A branch line from Liberty Township (also located in Trumbull County) to the Ashtabula Branch of the LS&MS was also authorized. The MCR gave improved access to extensive coal mines, and its rolling stock was designed specifically to carry bulk coal. The LS&MS leased the line for 99 years beginning May 1, 1873. Stone was a director of the MCR for the rest of his life (except for the 18-month period in 1875 and 1876 when he was in Europe to regain his health).

=== Health issues and the Ashtabula bridge disaster ===
In the Panic of 1873, Stone lost as much as $1 million ($26,875,000 in 2025 dollars) making payments on loans called by desperate bankers and friends, and in financially propping up his friends and business associates. He also lost large sums of money selling stock in the LS&MS and in Western Union at panic prices. Stone hid the extent of his financial difficulties from almost everyone, but his son-in-law John Hay believed Stone neared bankruptcy. Stone weathered the financial crisis, however, and recovered most of his wealth.

Stone's financial situation recovered enough that he was able to invest in the Mississippi Valley and Western Railway. This was a railroad (organized May 22, 1871) which merged on January 20, 1873, with the Mississippi Valley and Western Railway and the Clarksville and Western Railroad Company under the name Mississippi Valley and Western Railway. Amasa Stone invested in the new company on January 20, 1873. The railroad defaulted on its bonds, and Stone not only became a co-owner of the road but was also named a director of the line on August 7, 1874. The bankruptcy court put the railroad up for sale, and it was sold to Andros Stone on April 14, 1875. Six days later, Andros Stone sold the railroad to the St. Louis, Keokuk and North Western Railway (SLK&NW), which had been formed by Andros Stone and others to acquire the assets of the bankrupt line. In December 1879, Stone became a director of the SLK&NW. Stone remained on the board of the SLK&NW until his death.

Stone invested in another railroad, the Keokuk, Iowa City and St. Paul Railroad, in 1875. This road, which formed in 1870, still had 30 miles (48 km) incomplete when Stone acquired it in May 1875. A board of directors (which did not include Stone) was installed, but the railroad's history is unclear after this.

Stone began to suffer from undisclosed major health problems in the spring of 1875, and he and his wife went to Europe for 18 months beginning in late 1875. This event largely sparked Stone's retirement from most of his business ventures. While overseas, he left the management of his enterprises in the hands of his son-in-law, John Hay. During his absence, the Great Railroad Strike of 1877 occurred, hitting his railroads hard.

While Stone was overseas in 1876, one of the greatest events in his life occurred. At 7:30 PM on December 29, the LS&MS bridge over the Ashtabula River collapsed in what came to be known as the Ashtabula River railroad disaster. One of two locomotives and 11 passenger railcars of the LS&MS plunged into the ice-clogged river below. The wooden cars burst into flame when their kerosene-fed heating stoves overturned, but rescue personnel made no attempt to extinguish the fire. The accident killed 92 people and injured 64. Amasa Stone had personally overseen both the bridge's design and its construction. He ordered the bridge built using a Howe truss design despite his chief engineer's argument that the span was too long to be safely bridged by that design. Stone later admitted that using a Howe truss for such a long span was "experimental". When bridge engineer Joseph Tomlinson expressed concern that the bridge could not handle the stresses place upon it, Stone fired him. State investigators later concluded that the bridge had been improperly designed, inadequately inspected by the LS&MS, and had used faulty materials (provided by the Cleveland Rolling Mill, which Stone's brother, Andros Stone, managed). They also found extensive evidence that the bridge had been poorly constructed: Struts were not in the correct place, braces were not tied together, and the bearings had been improperly laid. Stone categorically denied that there were any design or construction flaws. Instead, he asserted that the bridge was designed to be stronger than it needed to be.

In one of his last major railroad positions, Stone briefly became a director of two railroads, the Massillon and Cleveland Railroad and the Pittsburgh, Fort Wayne and Chicago Railway, in early 1883.

== Standard Oil ==
Twice, Amasa Stone proved crucial to the success of John D. Rockefeller's oil refining career.

=== The 1868 secret rebate agreement ===
The first time came in 1868. On March 4, 1867, John D. Rockefeller, his brother William Rockefeller, chemist Samuel Andrews, and businessman Henry Flagler formed the oil refining firm of Rockefeller, Andrews & Flagler. (Flagler's step-brother, the liquor magnate Stephen V. Harkness, was a silent partner.) Transportation costs were the key to making oil cheaply available to consumers, and cheap oil meant more market share (and more profit). For Rockefeller, Andrews & Flagler, the question was how to get its refined oil to East Coast cities. At the time, the railroads were engaged in cutthroat competition for refined oil. Rate-cutting was common (with railways often losing money on shipments). Each road also attempted to win more oil freight business by rapidly building up its supply of tank cars, but this left the railroads with an oversupply of cars, which lost them even more money. In 1868, Rockefeller formed a consortium of Cleveland-area refining companies. The consortium agreed to pool their shipments to the East Coast if lower freight rates could be procured. On behalf of the consortium, Henry Flagler reached an agreement with Stone's Lake Shore & Michigan Southern: The consortium would guarantee at least 60 tank cars of refined oil every day, in return for which the LS&MS would cut shipping rates by 30 percent (e.g., offer a "rebate"). The consortium agreed not to ship oil with any other railway unless the LS&MS could not take the oil, and the LS&MS agreed not to offer a rebate to any other refiners unless they could provide at least 60 tank cars of oil a day (which none of them could). Stone quickly agreed to the plan, which greatly enhanced Rockefeller, Andrews & Flagler's market share.

=== The 1871-1872 South Improvement Company conspiracy ===
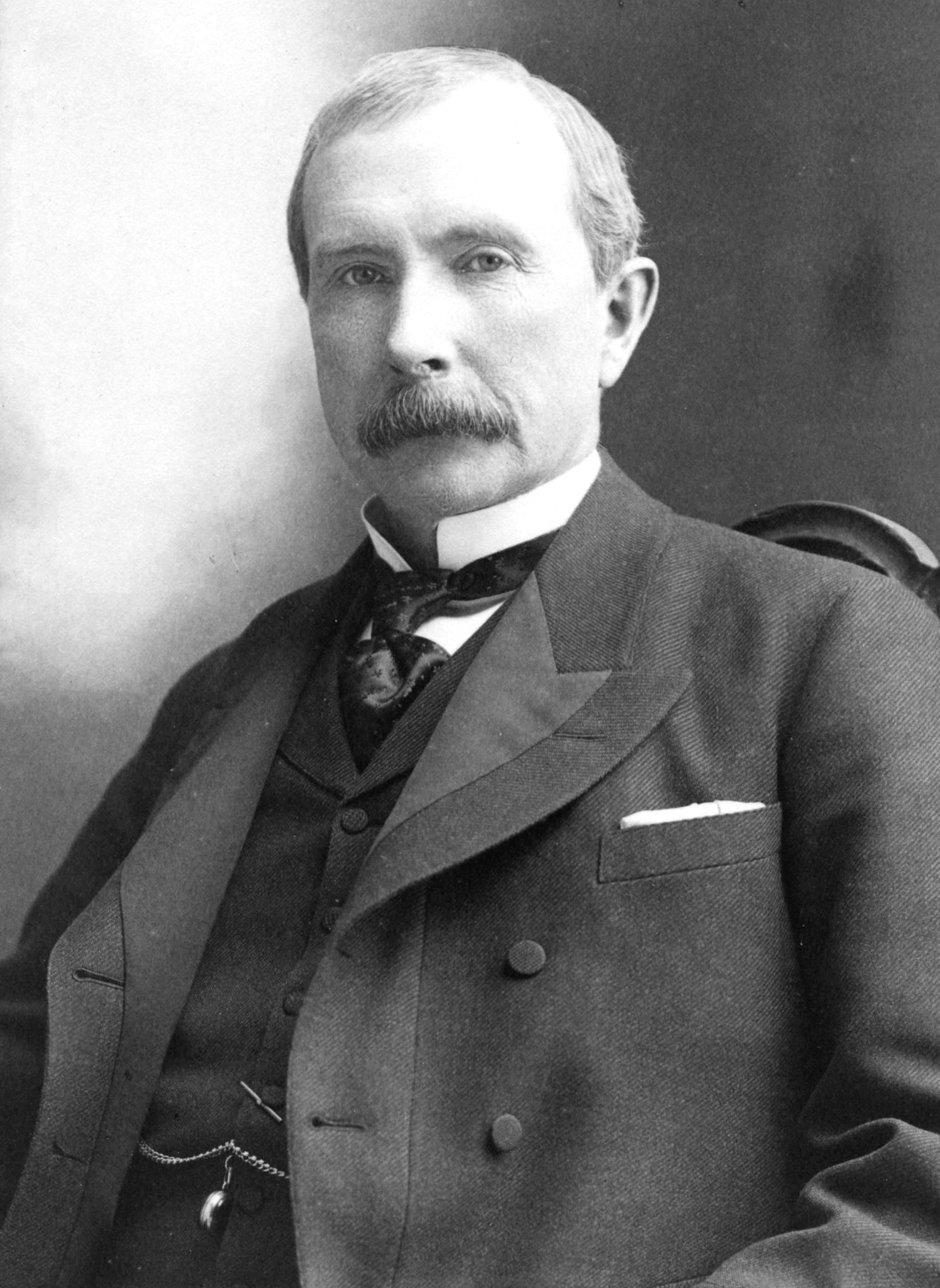
John D. Rockefeller in 1885.

The second time came in 1871. Rockefeller had long believed that overcapacity in the oil refining business would cause a crash in the price of refined oil. Anticipating the crash, on January 10, 1870, Rockefeller and his partners established a new joint-stock company, Standard Oil. Just 10,000 shares of Standard Oil were created. John and William Rockefeller, Flagler, Harkness, and Andrews took almost all the shares. A new investor, Oliver B. Jennings (William Rockefeller's brother-in-law), invested $100,000 in the new company and was given 1,000 shares. The old company of Rockefeller, Andrews & Flagler was given 1,000 shares as a reserve. (Note: The 10,000 shares of Standard Oil were distributed thusly: John D. Rockefeller – 2,667 (26.7 percent); William Rockefeller – 1,333 (13.3 percent); Henry Flagler – 1,333 (13.3 percent); Samuel Andrews – 1,333 (13.3 percent); Stephen Harkness – 1,334 (13.3 percent); Oliver B. Jennings – 1,000 (10 percent); Rockefeller, Andrews & Flagler – 1,000 (10 percent).) The stock was set at a $100 per share par value ($2,546 in 2025 dollars), and Standard Oil paid a 105 percent dividend in 1870 and 1871. The overcapacity crash hit in 1871, and many refiners neared bankruptcy. In the fall of 1871, Rockefeller learned of a conspiracy (Note: Conspiracy is the correct term. Business historian George C. Kohn points out, "It was essentially a conspiracy for restraint of trade..." and Rockefeller biographer Ron Chernow calls it "an infamous conspiracy". Cornelius Vanderbilt biographer T. J. Stiles says "The symbolism of their conspiracy, far more than its actual impact on business, would turn it into one of the most notorious incidents in the rise of corporate capitalism in America.") being promoted by Thomas A. Scott (First Vice President of the Pennsylvania Railroad) and Peter H. Watson (then a director of the LS&MS). On November 30, 1871, Rockefeller met with Scott and Watson at the St. Nicholas Hotel in New York City, where Scott outlined his plan: Using a vaguely-worded corporate charter he had obtained from the Pennsylvania General Assembly, (Note: The Pennsylvania General Assembly created such corporate charters routinely during the 1860s and 1870s, usually after the generous application of bribes. Dozens of such corporate charters were created.) the Pennsylvania Railroad, the New York Central Railroad, the Erie Railroad, Standard Oil, and a few small oil refining companies would create and invest in the South Improvement Company (SIC). The SIC's participating railroads would give the SIC's investor-refiners a 50 percent rebate on oil shipments, helping them to drive competitors out of business. Additionally, any time the SIC carried the oil of a non-participating refiner, the SIC would give a 40-cents-per-barrel payment ($11 in 2025 dollars) to the investor-refiners. The SIC would also provide the investor-refiners with information on the shipments of their competitors, giving them a critical advantage in pricing and sales.

Rockefeller saw the SIC as the ideal mechanism for achieving another goal: A monopoly on oil refining in Cleveland. Once the SIC had severely weakened his competitors, Standard Oil would buy out the city's 26 major oil refining companies at fire-sale prices. The monopoly would allow Standard Oil to dominate the national refining market, garner significantly higher profits, and drive competitors out of business. With higher profits, Standard Oil could then rapidly expand, becoming even more dominant. To make the purchases, Standard Oil needed cash. To secure the cash, Rockefeller allowed Amasa Stone, Stillman Witt, Benjamin Brewster, and Truman P. Handy (Note: Handy was a banker and railroad financier.)—all of whom were officers in Cleveland banks—to buy shares in Standard Oil at par in December 1871. (Note: Stone purchased 500 shares, Witt 500 shares, Handy 400 shares, and Brewster 250 shares. The number of shares in Standard Oil remained 10,000. The shares purchased by the bankers came from John D. Rockefeller (651 shares), Oliver B. Jennings (500 shares), and the reserve (1,000 shares).) Stone and the other bankers used their influence at their own and other banks to give Rockefeller the financial backing he needed. Stone now owned the equivalent of 5 percent of the entire outstanding stock of Standard Oil.

The SIC conspiracy collapsed in March 1872, but between February 17 and March 28, 1872, Rockefeller was able to buy out 22 of the 26 major refiners in Cleveland, an event which historians call "the Cleveland Massacre". Stone played a major part in the success of the event. Rockefeller knew that if he bought out the weak refiners first, he'd generate opposition and never get a chance to take on the larger, more profitable ones. So he tackled his strongest competitor, the firm of Clark, Payne & Co., led by Oliver Hazard Payne and backed by the wealthy J. G. Hussey family. In December 1871, Rockefeller asked Payne to meet him at the Second National Bank in Cleveland to discuss business matters in which the bank had an interest. Stone and Stillman Witt were both officers in the bank. Payne swiftly agreed to a merger of his interests with Rockefeller's, and the transaction closed in early January 1872.

Events moved so quickly that additional capital was needed, and Rockefeller felt that the Cleveland banks could not be counted on to keep his loan requests confidential. On January 2, 1872, Standard Oil issued 4,000 new shares of stock in the form of a dividend. Stock was issued on a pro rata basis, which gave Stone another 200 shares. Later that same day, another issue of stock was made. This constituted 11,000 shares, of which 3,000 were given to John D. Rockefeller, 1,400 to Henry Flagler, 4,000 to the owners of Clark, Payne and Company (one of the largest oil refineries in Cleveland), 700 to refiner Jabez A. Bostwick, 200 to refiner Joseph Stanley, and 500 to Peter Watson (who by now was the president of the SIC). Another 1,200 shares were given to John D. Rockefeller to retain as a reserve. On January 2, 1872, a third new issue of 10,000 shares occurred, and was given to Rockefeller to hold in reserve. Although these new issues had diluted Stone's investment to just 2 percent of Standard Oil's stock, it was enough to give him a strong financial interest in the company and to allow John D. Rockefeller to tighten his influence over railroads Stone directed.

To further encourage Stone to meet the needs of Standard Oil, Rockefeller put Stone on the Standard Oil board of directors in 1871. By 1872, Amasa Stone's personal fortune was worth an estimated $6 million ($161,250,000 in 2025 dollars).

=== Break with Rockefeller ===
Stone's association with Standard Oil did not last past mid-1872. The break came when Rockefeller approached the Second National Bank, of which Stone was a director, for a major loan in early 1872. (Note: Nevins characterizes this differently: The board of directors of Standard Oil sought a loan in order to continue expansion, and Stone opposed it during a board meeting.) Stone expected the much younger Rockefeller to be deferential and suppliant, but he was not. Stone angrily opposed the loan during a bank board of directors meeting. (Note: Rockefeller later said that he believed age had "clouded" Stone's judgement.) After Rockefeller made his case to the board, Stone suggested that Payne and Witt arbitrate the dispute. The two officers voted to support Rockefeller. The relationship between Stone and Rockefeller deteriorated swiftly, and Stone repeatedly snubbed Rockefeller socially.

Like other directors, Stone had been given an option to buy additional Standard Oil shares. About June 1872, this option expired without Stone having acted to buy the new shares. Stone then asked Henry Flagler to change the expiration date so he could purchase the shares. Flagler did so, but Rockefeller overruled Flagler when he learned about the change. Flagler argued that Stone's support was useful, and that he should be placated. Rockefeller disagreed, saying that he saw no reason to "truckle" to Stone.

In a fit of pique, Stone sold all his Standard Oil shares, making him ineligible to continue serving on the board. Rockefeller never regretted his actions. He later said that he "probably saved two or three million dollars" in profit by getting rid of Stone.

On July 30–31, 1872, Standard Oil's terminal at Hunters Point, New York, suffered a devastating fire. With the company's insurer refusing to pay until after an investigation, Standard Oil was in desperate need for cash to rebuild. The officers of the company asked Rockefeller to seek a loan from the Second National Bank. At a meeting between Rockefeller and the bank's directors, Stone demanded that Standard Oil be appraised and its financial condition assessed before any loan was issued. Offended, Stillman Witt approved the loan, and Stone was stymied. (Note: In the end, the insurer paid and no loan was needed.)

=== United Pipe Lines ===
Stone had one more interaction with Rockefeller and Standard Oil. Standard Oil relied on its rebate deals with the railroads to get its oil to market. Two companies, Vandergrift & Forman and the American Transfer Company, now threatened that arrangement by announcing the construction of pipelines from the western Pennsylvania oilfields to New York City. William H. Vanderbilt, Cornelius Vanderbilt's son and vice-president of the New York Central Railroad, saw the threat as well. In 1873, Amasa Stone and William H. Vanderbilt attempted to gain control of Vandegrift & Forman, each taking a one-sixth interest in the firm. Rockefeller purchased a one-third share, and the company was renamed United Pipe Lines. Rockefeller then purchased American Transfer, effectively blocking Stone and Vanderbilt from gaining control of the emerging pipeline industry. Standard Oil eventually formed a new company, United Pipe-Lines, in 1877 and merged both United and American Transfer into the new firm. Although Stone held more than 1,000 shares of the new company, his ownership interest was small compared to that held by Rockefeller and others.

== Banking and other roles ==
=== Banking and finance ===
Stone's interest in industries and services other than railroads emerged early after he moved to Cleveland. In 1856, Stone—along with Hinman Hurlbut, Stillman Witt, Joseph Perkins, James Mason, Henry Perkins, Morrison Waite, and Samuel Young—purchased the Toledo Branch of the State Bank of Ohio. Stone served as the bank's president from 1857 probably to 1864. The Toledo Branch was reorganized as a national bank in 1866.

Stone then helped organize the Cleveland Banking Company in 1863 with Stillman Witt, George A. Garretson, Jeptha Wade, and George B. Ely, and was elected to its first board of directors. It merged with the Second National Bank in 1868, and Stone was elected president of the successor bank in January 1873. He resigned in January 1874.

Stone helped reorganize the Commercial Bank on March 1, 1865, after its initial 20-year charter expired. Rechartered as the Commercial National Bank, Stone was elected a director of the bank and in 1879 served as its vice president. Stone was also a director of the Bank of Commerce (although just when he became a director is not clear). He was elected president of the bank in 1873, but resigned in late 1874 and was replaced by Hiram Garretson. He was also a director of the Merchants Bank (although the dates of his service are not clear).

=== Metals manufacturing ===
Stone's interests also extended heavily into metallurgy and metals manufacturing. In 1863, Stone, George B. Ely, and others helped organize the Mercer Iron & Coal Company in Mercer County, Pennsylvania. Stone was named a director of the company, and later its president (although the date of this latter service is not clear). Stone also co-founded the Union Iron Company (later Union Iron & Steel Co.) in Chicago with his brother, Andros Stone, and mining magnate Jay C. Morse. Stone loaned his brother $800,000 ($20,918,919 in 2025 dollars) to organizer the business.

A third steel mill organized by Stone was the Cleveland Rolling Mill (later known as the American Steel & Wire Co.), which was organized on November 9, 1863. The firm was established in 1857 as Chisholm, Jones and Company, and in 1860 the company was reorganized as Stone, Chisholm & Jones after the family-run business received major investments from Amasa Stone, Henry Chisholm, Andros Stone, Stillman Witt, Jeptha Wade, and Henry B. Payne. Andros Stone managed the firm. It changed its name to the Cleveland Rolling Mill Company, purchased the Cleveland Wire Mill Co. in 1866, and obtained control of the Union Rolling Mill Co. of Chicago in 1871. At some point, Stone also invested a substantial sum in the Kansas City Rolling Mill Company of Kansas City, Missouri.

Stone then founded the Union Steel Screw Company in 1872 with Andros Stone, William Chisholm, Henry Chisholm, and Henry B. Payne. The factory, which was located at Case and Payne Avenues in Cleveland, was the only one in the United States making steel wood screws at that time.

In January 1881, Stone and others provided financial assistance to veteran brass manufacturer Joel Hayden, Jr. in establishing the Joel Hayden Brass Works in Lorain, Ohio.

About 1875, Stone also invested $500,000 in the new iron foundry of Brown, Bonnell & Co. of Youngstown, Ohio. He was placed on the board of directors of the firm (although the date of his departure from the board is unclear).

=== Other business ventures ===
Stone had a number of other business interests and ventures in addition to banking and metallurgy. Immediately upon his arrival in Cleveland in 1850, Stone created the Cleveland Stone Dressing Company with Parker Handy, J.P. Bishop, William E. Beckwith, F.T. Backus, J.H. Morley, H.K. Raynolds, Reuben Hitchcock, and John Case. The company bought large stone quarries in Berea (the "old Eldridge quarry") and Independence, and built a small railroad to ship the stone to Cleveland. There, they established a stoneyard on west bank of Cuyahoga River, and dredged the river to make it navigable to ships carrying their dressed stone. Cleveland Stone Dressing furnished stone for a number of large mansions in Cleveland; the First Presbyterian Church of East Cleveland; the Ontario Legislative Building in Toronto, Ontario, Canada; and the residence of Senator Henry B. Payne. The firm closed in 1854 due to lack of demand. The stoneyard was later taken over by Rhodes & Co., a major coal distributor.

Other business interests included a Cleveland woolen mill (established in 1861), and a position on the board of directors of the Buckeye Insurance Company (which he held in 1869). On February 26, 1870, Stone, Jeptha Wade, Worthy S. Streator, J.P. Robinson, and others formed the Northern Ohio Fair after the state refused to allow the Ohio State Fair to be hosted by the city of Cleveland. The group purchased 87 acres (350,000 m^{2}) of land on St. Clair Avenue in the Glenville neighborhood and erected fair buildings there. Stone served as the fair's first president. In 1877, Stone dabbled in real estate by constructing a building on St. Clair Avenue in Cleveland's Warehouse District. The structure housed the Koch, Goldsmith, Joseph & Company clothing firm, which later (as The Joseph and Feiss Company) became one of the largest clothing retailers in the nation. (Note: This building was probably located at 75-77 West St. Clair Avenue.)

Both historic and modern sources say that Amasa Stone also invested in a wide range of factories, including those which manufactured automobiles, railroad cars, and bridges.

Stone also had a position on the board of directors of the Western Union telegraph company. Jeptha Wade had been president of Western Union in 1866, and Stone may have invested at this time in the company. By 1880, Cornelius Vanderbilt was a major investor in the firm, and was even rumored to have a controlling interest in it. It was Vanderbilt who had Stone appointed to Western Union's board of directors in 1881. Stone served on the board until his death in 1883.

== Death ==
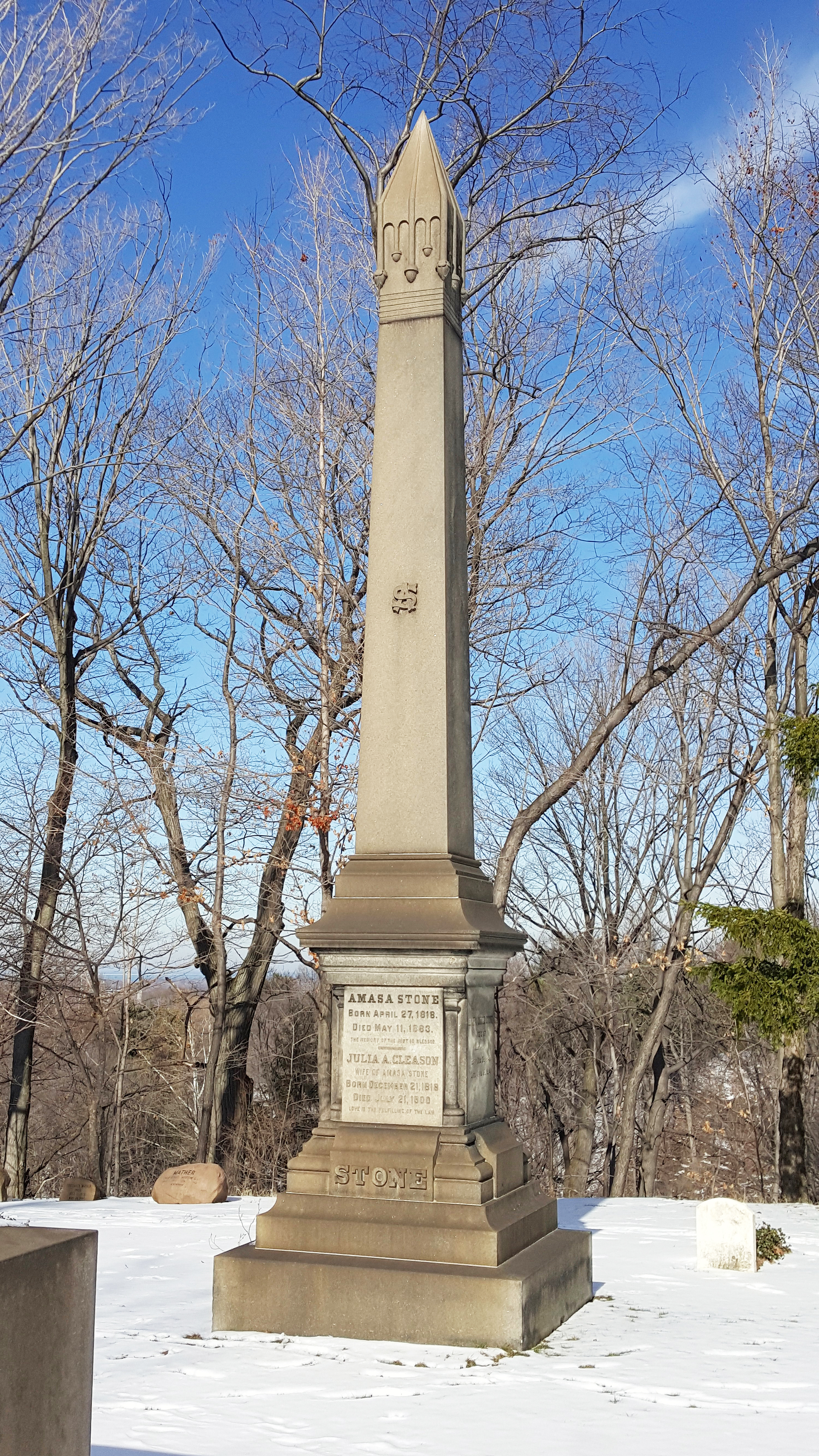
Cenotaph over the grave of Amasa Stone at Lake View Cemetery.

After 1875, many of Amasa Stone's businesses suffered severe financial setbacks, and some of them failed. He suffered from stomach ulcers which often kept him awake for two hours each night. It was widely believed by the public that the Ashtabula River railroad disaster had deeply affected Stone emotionally, causing his health to worsen after 1876.

By 1882, Stone was suffering from insomnia. That year, his son-in-law, John Hay, took his wife, Clara Stone Hay, on a long-delayed 18-month honeymoon to Europe. Hay biographer Patricia O'Toole concludes that Amasa Stone was, by this time, suffering from severe depression. He wrote to Hay constantly, his "ambivalent" letters full of muffled "cries for help". Stone's depression appeared to worsen when several of his businesses failed in the first three months of 1883. First, the Cleveland Rolling Mill Co. was hit by a bitter strike in 1882, which caused it significant financial problems. Then on February 2, 1883, the Kansas City Rolling Mill Co. failed. The Union Iron & Steel Co. went into receivership a few days later, (Note: The cause was a major strike, precipitated by the company's demand for a 50 percent increase in the workday without a pay raise. The company asked the Chicago Police Department for assistance in breaking the strike, but the police refused. The company lost the strike and acceded to the workers' demands to return to the eight-hour day.) followed by Brown, Bonnell & Co. on February 19. Stone blamed high labor costs for the failure, but the Depression of 1882–85 was more likely the cause. Shortly thereafter, Stone asked Hay to cut short his trip and return to Cleveland, but Hay (who was to return to the United States in May) declined.

At 2 PM on May 11, 1883, Stone was working at his home on Euclid Avenue. He spoke several times with his business secretary, and was advised by his wife to rest. Stone then retired to his bedroom. At 4 PM, Julia Stone went to check on her husband, and found his bed empty and his bathroom door locked. She called for a butler, who climbed through the transom and found Stone dead. He had shot himself in the heart and then fallen forward so that his head and shoulders lay in the bathtub. A gun lay by his side.

It was widely assumed by the press and the public that lingering poor health brought about by the 1867 carriage accident, guilt over the Ashtabula River railroad disaster, and overwork caused his suicide.

Stone was an unpopular man in Cleveland. To many members of the public, the manner of his demise seemed just. Mark Twain sarcastically observed, "Apparently nothing pleases the Almighty like the picturesque."

Amasa Stone was temporarily interred in the Brainard family vault at Lake View Cemetery. Ice was packed around the body and regularly replenished, to keep decay at bay until John and Clara Hay could return from Europe. He was later interred in a plot he had purchased shortly before his death.

== Personal life ==
Amasa Stone was described by contemporaries as proud, stubborn man with a quick-tempered. Business associates and friends also found him cold, stern, and unapproachable. He could be arbitrary, autocratic, and domineering, and was known for his temper and biting tongue. He shunned expensive clothes and rich food, and drank only sparingly.

Stone was a Presbyterian and an active member of the First Presbyterian (Old Stone) Church on Public Square in downtown Cleveland. For several years, he was also a trustee of the church, and he gave generously to various church organizations which aided the poor, the elderly, orphans, and single women with children.

Republican Party politics was another of Stone's interests. In addition to his friendship with Abraham Lincoln, he was a key financial backer of James A. Garfield in his bid for the 1880 Republican nomination and his successful campaign for the presidency. Garfield considered appointing Stone as the U.S. government's representative on the board of directors of the Union Pacific Railroad, but Stone turned him down (the position was occupied by Senator Benjamin Wade, who had not indicated his desire to relinquish it).

Stone purchased a home in 1850 on the corner of Superior Avenue and Bond Street (now East 6th Street) in Cleveland, Ohio. He lived in this nondescript house (later the site of the Hollenden Hotel) until 1858, when he purchased a plot of land at 1255 Euclid Avenue (Euclid and East 13th Street) in Cleveland. Euclid Avenue was known worldwide at the time as "Millionaires' Row" for the large number of extremely wealthy people who built or purchased residences there. Local architect Joseph Ireland designed a two-story, 8,500-square-foot (790 m^{2}), Italianate mansion replete with modern conveniences and innovative safety features. Stone lived in the mansion until his death, after which it was occupied by his wife, Julia; his daughter, Flora Stone Mather; and her husband, Samuel Livingston Mather II. (Note: Stone had signed over the deed to his Euclid Avenue home to Flora and Samuel Mather in 1874.) Julia died in 1900, and Flora in 1909. The mansion was demolished after Flora's death to make way for the four (later five) story Higbee's department store building, which was completed in 1910. Higbee's vacated the building in 1931 for a new, larger structure on Public Square. The building was then occupied by Sterling Lindner Davis department store. Sterling Lindner Davis vacated the building in 1968, and it has served as an office building ever since.

Stone was not a noted outdoorsman, but viewed hunting as a leisure activity of the upper class. Subsequently, on April 19, 1873, Stone purchased several hundred acres of land near the villages of Elko and Red House, New York. He spent a total of $40,000 ($1,075,000 in 2025 dollars) making additional purchases over the next few years, until his forest estate reached about 7,000 acres (28 km^{2}). Stone intended to use the estate as a hunting preserve and for the breeding of short-horn cattle.

=== Marriage and children ===
Amasa Stone married Julia Ann Gleason of Warren, Massachusetts, on January 12, 1842. Born December 21, 1818, she was the daughter of John Barnes and Cynthia (née Hamilton) Gleason. Amasa's older brother, Daniel, had married Julia's older sister, Huldah, in 1838. Julia worked as a seamstress in Warren. Julia lived until July 21, 1900, when she died of pulmonary tuberculosis.

The Stone's first child, Adelbert Barnes Stone, was born on July 28, 1844. He attended Yale University, where he studied for a degree in geology. Adelbert drowned in the Connecticut River on June 27, 1865, after suffering a cramp while swimming.

The couple's second child, Clara Louise, was born on December 29, 1849. She wed John Hay on February 4, 1874, at which time Amasa gifted the couple $10,000 in securities. Stone convinced the couple to move to Cleveland in the spring of 1875, just as Amasa's health declined. He gave Hay employment caring for investments "so safe that they require no care". Stone also constructed a Victorian-style mansion at 1235 Euclid Avenue, next door to his own home, and gave it to the Hays for their own home. The mansion was completed in June 1875. Stone had a "profound" influence on Hay's life, giving him the life of ease necessary to complete a biography of Lincoln as well as putting him on a course in business that made Hay a very rich man. Hay later used his experiences running Stone's railroad interests during the strikes of 1877 as the basis for his 1883 novel The Bread-Winners. The character of the vice president of the steel mill is based on Amasa Stone.

The couple's third child, Flora Amelia, was born on April 6, 1852. She married shipping and iron mining magnate Samuel Livingston Mather II on October 19, 1881. Flora not only was a rich woman because of the many gifts of cash and securities her father gave her during her lifetime, but also because of her husband's extremely large fortune. After Amasa Stone's death, Flora received not only a large inheritance from him but also helped administer his many devises. Flora became one of the great philanthropists in Ohio history. She made major donations to Case Western Reserve University and the Goodrich House social settlement, and supported the Temperance League, Consumer's League, Day Nursery and Kindergarten Association, Children's Aid Society, and Home for Aged Women.

Amasa Stone's great-grandson was Amasa Stone Bishop, son of Constance Stone (née Mather) Bishop (the daughter of Flora Stone Mather). He became the director of the United States Atomic Energy Commission and the director of environment of the United Nations Economic Commission for Europe.

== Legacy ==
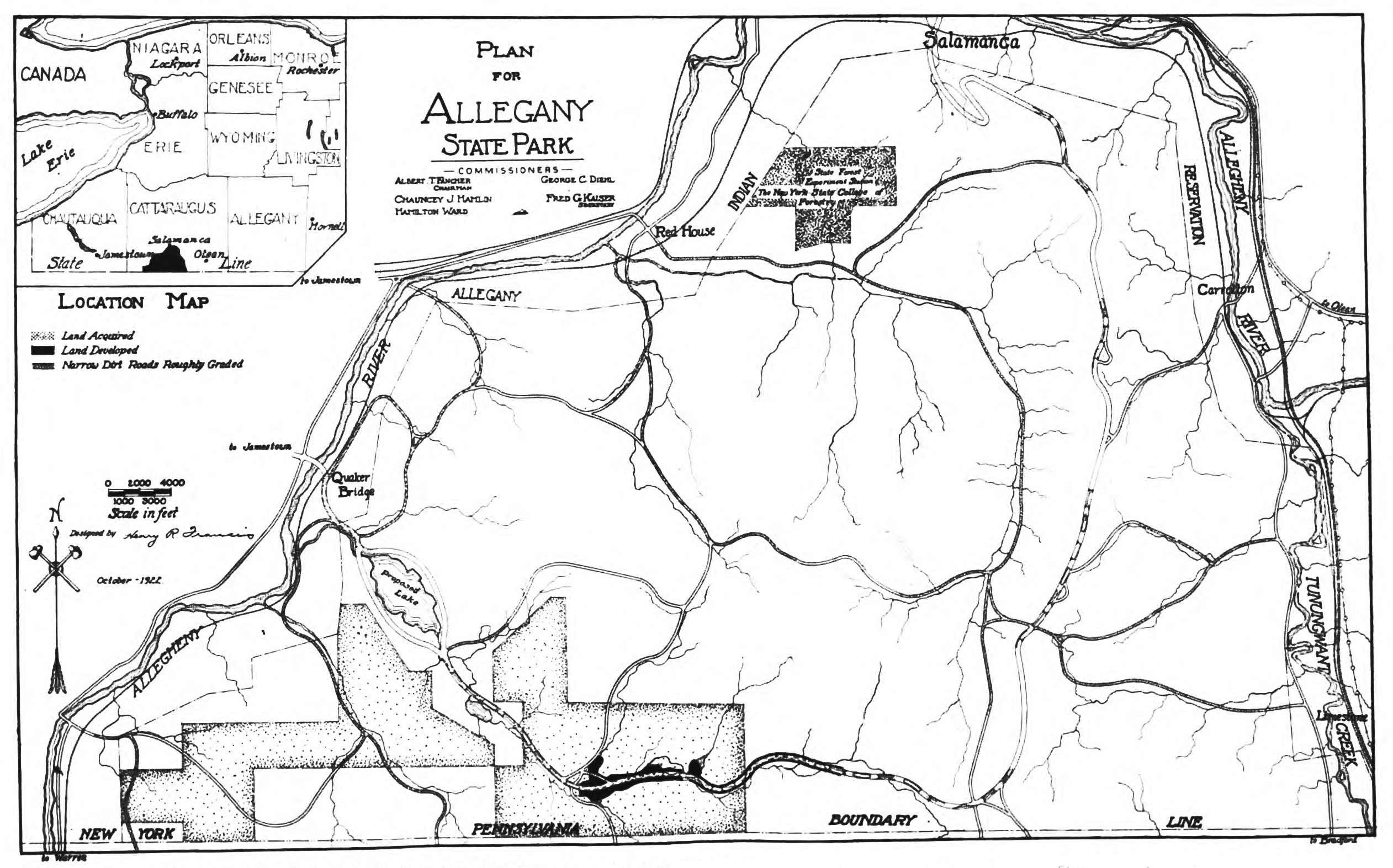
A map of Allegany State Park from 1922, showing the extent of the Stone Estate (shaded areas, lower left).

At the time of his death, Amasa Stone was widely regarded by the press as the richest man in Cleveland, and modern historians have called him a nationally prominent economic leader. He was well known during his lifetime for having risen from the working class to amass a very large fortune, and for having built an "empire" of railroads. His fortune in 1872 was widely estimated by the press to be $6 million ($161,250,000 in 2025 dollars).

Stone supported several charitable causes in lasting ways. He educated his daughters at the Cleveland Academy, a school for girls founded in 1848, and in 1865 oversaw a capital fundraising campaign and the construction of the school's first building. He donated money in 1876 to construct and endow the Home for Aged Protestant Gentlewomen at 194 Kennard Road. The organization later moved out of this structure in 1931 to property donated by William G. Pollock at 975 East Blvd., and is known as the Amasa Stone House. It later merged with the McGregor Foundation, and in 2014 the house was sold to Montessori Development Partnerships for use as a school. He also donated money which led to the construction in 1881 of an addition to the Children's Aid Society home for youth at 1745 Detroit Street in Cleveland.

Perhaps Stone's greatest legacy was the gift which led to the foundation of what became known as Case Western Reserve University. The city of Cleveland had no major institution of higher learning in the 1870s, and in 1880 a community commission issued a report advocating that one be founded or induced to move there. Dr. Hiram C. Haydn, pastor at the First Presbyterian (Old Stone) Church and a trustee of Western Reserve College in Hudson, Ohio, proposed that the college move to Cleveland. Haydn approached Amasa Stone with the idea, who expressed his support. On September 20, 1880, Stone donated $500,000 ($16,681,034 in 2025 dollars) to Western Reserve College for the purpose of enabling its relocation to Cleveland. He attached three conditions to his gift: First, that the school become a university, and that its liberal arts college be named Adelbert College after his son; Second, that Stone be enabled to name a majority of Western Reserve College's board of trustees; and Third, that Stone be allowed to supervise construction of the new university's buildings. The trustees agreed to his stipulations. The college successfully raised the funds to procure land near what is now University Circle in Cleveland, and Stone named 11 new trustees to the university's board. These included John Hay; former President of the United States Rutherford B. Hayes; and the newly elected President of the United States, James A. Garfield. (Garfield died from an assassin's bullet before the school opened.) Stone oversaw the construction of the Main Building (now Adelbert Hall) and a men's dormitory. On October 26, 1882, Western Reserve University's new main campus was dedicated, with Hayes the main speaker at the opening. After Stone's death in 1883, his family donated an additional $100,000 ($3,455,357 in 2025 dollars) to Western Reserve University. The all-male university soon experimented with mixed-sex education, but this generated extensive opposition. Determined to provide women with an education, Flora Stone Mather donated a large sum of money to establish a women-only college at Western Reserve. Her donation paid for Guilford Hall (named for her teacher at Cleveland Academy) and Haydn Hall (named for her pastor at First Presbyterian and now Western Reserve's president). The College for Woman opened in 1889, and was renamed Flora Stone Mather College in 1929 in her honor. Adelbert Hall is the university's administration building today.

It is not clear how large Amasa Stone's personal estate was worth at the time of his death. Historian John Taliaferro estimated it to be worth between $6 million and $22 million ($207,321,429 in 2025 dollars to $760,178,571 in 2025 dollars). Historian Gladys Haddad dismisses the larger estimates as inflated, and suggests the estate was worth between $6 million and $8 million ($207,321,429 in 2025 dollars to $276,428,571 in 2025 dollars). Stone's sons-in-law, John Hay and Samuel Livingston Mather II, were named as his executors. Stone left his wife $500,000 in securities ($17,276,786 in 2025 dollars), which was expected to generate a large amount of interest. The will stipulated that Julia should receive $25,000 ($863,839 in 2025 dollars) a year from this income, payable in monthly installments. He bequeathed $600,000 in securities ($20,732,143 in 2025 dollars) to each daughter, and $100,000 ($7,601,786 in 2025 dollars) each to John Hay and Samuel Livingston Mather II. Other bequests and donations totalled about $137,000 ($4,733,839 in 2025 dollars).

In 1921, Amasa Stone's former hunting estate formed the nucleus of Allegany State Park. At some point after 1904, the heirs of Amasa Stone sold the New York estate to W.J. Knupp and his wife, Eloise. Residents of the Red House/Elko area formed a committee on November 8, 1920, to discuss the formation of a state park in Cattaraugus County and to push for legislative authority to establish a park as well as state funds to purchase land. The New York State Legislature approved the purchase of two tracts of land in the Quaker Run Valley on May 2, 1921. The act provided $25,000 in state funds for the purchase of land, provided that an equal amount in private funds be raised first. The first tract, consisting of 7,020 acres (28.4 km^{2}) of land, was purchased from Eloise Knupp for $31,500 on June 18, 1921. The second tract consisted of 150 acres (0.61 km^{2}) of land and buildings adjacent to the Stone Estate. The price for this property was $4,300. These lands, in the southwest corner of the park, were formally dedicated as Allegany State Park on July 30, 1921.

=== In popular culture ===
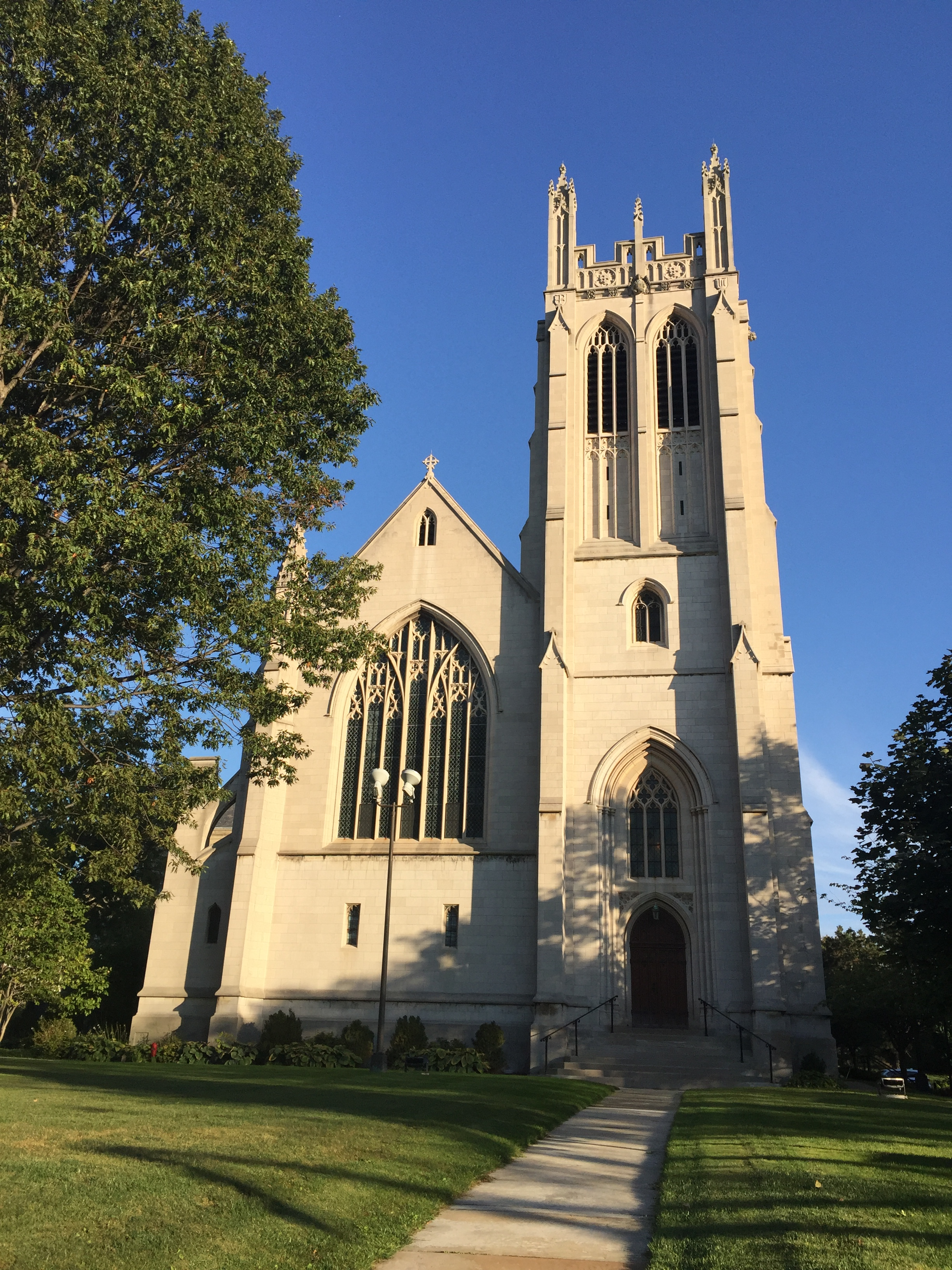
Amasa Stone Chapel.

Stone was the basis for a major character in John Hay's 1883 anti-union novel The Breadwinners. In response to Hay's novel, journalist Henry Francis Keenan (a former colleague of Hay's at the New-York Tribune) published The Money-Makers in 1885. The novel was an attack on robber barons and industrialists, and its main character was an idealistic journalist who marries into a wealthy family and abandons his progressive values for greed, power, and materialism. John Hay clearly inspired the main character, and Amasa Stone was obviously the basis for the grasping, cruel industrialist Aaron Grimestone.

About 1884, the Stone family paid for and dedicated the Amasa Stone Memorial Window, a stained glass window in the sanctuary at the First Presbyterian (Old Stone) Church.

In 1905, the Mesaba Steamship Company, a subsidiary of Pickands Mather (the company which Samuel Livingston Mather II had co-founded in 1883), launched a Great Lakes bulk freighter named in honor of Amasa Stone. The freighter was later transferred to Pickands Mather's Interlake Steamship Company. The Amasa Stone was an active freighter until 1960. In 1965, the Amasa Stone was scuttled along with the freighter Charles S. Hebard off Charlevoix, Michigan. It now serves as a breakwater for the St. Mary's Cement plant shipping terminal.

In 1910, Stone's family donated money to Western Reserve University for a new chapel. Construction began on the Amasa Stone Chapel in 1910, and it was dedicated and opened on June 13, 1911.

== See also ==
- Flora Stone Mather College Historic District

== Bibliography ==
- "Amasa Stone". Magazine of Western History: 108–112. December 1885.
- Annals of the First Presbyterian Church of Cleveland, 1820-1895. Cleveland: Press of Winn & Judson. 1895. p. 245. "Amasa Stone Old Stone Church."
- Ashcroft, John (1865). Ashcroft's Railway Directory for 1864. New York: John Ashcroft.
- Baldwin, Thomas; Thomas, J. (1854). A New and Complete Gazetteer of the United States. Philadelphia: Lippincott, Grambo & Co. p. 643. "Bellefontaine and Indianapolis."
- Bates, James L. (1888). Alfred Kelley: His Life and Work. Columbus, Ohio: Press of R. Clarke & Co. p. 179. "Alfred Kelley Cleveland, Painesville and Ashtabula."
- Camp, Mark J. (2007). Railroad Depots of Northeast Ohio. Charleston, S.C.: Arcadia Publishing. ISBN 9780738551159.
- Chandler, Alfred D. (1977). The Visible Hand: The Managerial Revolution in American Business. Cambridge, Mass.: Belknap Press. ISBN 9780674940512.
- Charlevoix Historical Society (1991). Historic Charlevoix: A Guide to Walking and Driving Tours of the Charlevoix Area's Most Historic Sites. Boyne City, Mich.: Harbor House Publishers.
- Chernow, Ron (2004). Titan: The Life of John D. Rockefeller, Sr. New York: Vintage Books. ISBN 9781400077304.
- Chicago, Burlington & Quincy Railroad Company (1882). Record Book of Trust Mortgages and Agreements; Also, Leases, Conveyances, Contracts, Agreements, and Articles of Consolidation Relating to the Chicago, Burlington and Quincy Railroad and Its Branches and Leased Roads. Boston: A. Mudge & Son.
- Chicago, Burlington & Quincy Railroad Company (1913). Corporate History of the Chicago, Burlington & Quincy Railroad Company and Affiliated Companies (as of Date June 30, 1917) Pursuant to Interstate Commerce Commission Valuation Order No. 20: Under Act of Congress Approved March 1, 1913. Chicago: Chicago, Burlington & Quincy Railroad Company.
- Commissioners of the Allegany State Park (1922). First Annual Report of the Commissioners of the Allegany State Park to the Legislature of the State of New York From June 1, 1921 to December 31, 1921 (Report). Albany, N.Y.: J.B. Lyon Company, Printers. hdl:2027/mdp.39015068143398.
- Congdon, Charles E. (1967). Allegany Oxbow: A History of Allegany State Park and the Allegany Reserve of the Seneca Nation. Little Valley, N.Y.: Straight Publishing Co.
- Cutter, William Richard (1913). New England Families, Genealogical and Memorial: A Record of the Achievements of Her People in the Making of Commonwealths and the Founding of a Nation. New York: Lewis Historical Publishing Co. p. 797. "Amasa Stone 1818 Charlton."
- Daughters of the American Revolution (1898). Lineage Book. Washington, D.C.: National Society of the Daughters of the American Revolution.
- D.S. Williams and Company (1882). Manufacturing and Mercantile Resources of Mercer County: An Industrial, Historical and Statistical Review. Erie, Pa.: Herald Printing and Publishing Co.
- Department of Inspection of Workshops and Factories (1891). Seventh Annual Report of the Department of Inspection of Workshops and Factories, to the General Assembly of the State of Ohio, for the year 1890. Columbus, Ohio: The Westbote Company, State Printers.
- Dutka, Alan F. (2015). Misfortune on Cleveland's Millionaires' Row. Charleston, S.C.: The History Press. ISBN 9781467117982.
- Goulder, Grace (1973). John D. Rockefeller: The Cleveland Years. Cleveland: Western Reserve Historical Society. ISBN 9780911704099.
- Guilford, Linda Thayer (1890). The Story of a Cleveland School, From 1848 to 1881. Cambridge, Mass.: John Wilson and Son. p. 94. "Amasa Stone Cleveland Academy."
- Haddad, Gladys (2007). Flora Stone Mather: Daughter of Cleveland's Euclid Avenue and Ohio's Western Reserve. Kent, Ohio: Kent State University Press. ISBN 978-0-87338-899-3.
- Hammerla, R.R. (2006). An American Scientist on the Research Frontier: Edward Morley, Community, and Radical Ideas in Nineteenth-Century Science. Dordrecht, Germany: Springer. ISBN 9781402040894.
- Hall, Peter D. (1992). Inventing the Nonprofit Sector and Other Essays on Philanthropy, Voluntarism, and Nonprofit Organizations. Baltimore, M.D.: Johns Hopkins University Press. ISBN 9780801842726.
- Hartman, Jan Cigliano (1991). Showplace of America: Cleveland's Euclid Avenue, 1850-1910. Kent, Ohio: Kent State University Press. ISBN 9780873384452.
- Hatcher, Harlan (1988). "Building the Railroads". In Lupold, Harry Forrest; Haddad, Gladys (eds.). Ohio's Western Reserve: A Regional Reader. Kent, Ohio: Kent State University Press. ISBN 9780873383639.
- Hillstrom, Kevin; Hillstrom, Laurie Collier (2005). The Industrial Revolution in America. Santa Barbara, Calif.: ABC-CLIO. ISBN 9781851096206.
- History of Trumbull and Mahoning Counties. Cleveland: H.Z. Williams & Bro. 1882.
- Homans, Benjamin (1856). The United States Railroad Directory, for 1856. New York: B. Homans. hdl:2027/mdp.39015076002461.
- Hover, John C. (1919). "The Story of Logan County". In Hover, John C Hover; Barnes, Joseph D.; Jones, Walter D.; Conover, Charlotte Reeve; Wright, Willard J.; Leiter, Clayton A.; Bradford, John Ewing; Culkins, W.C. (eds.). Memoirs of the Miami Valley. Volume 1. Chicago: Robert O. Law Co. "Bellefontaine and Indiana construction 1849."
- "How the Lake Shore Railroad Became Great". The Conductor and Brakeman: 158–163. March 1898.
- Isaac, Larry W. (2012). "Genre and Its Selection by Aesthetic Activists". In Earl, Jennifer S.; Rohlinger, Deana A. (eds.). Media, Movements, and Political Change. Bingley, U.K.: Emerald. ISBN 9781780528809.
- Johnson, Crisfield (1879). History of Cuyahoga County, Ohio: With Portraits and Biographical Sketches of Its Prominent Men and Pioneers. Philadelphia: D.W. Ensign. p. 384. "Amasa Stone 1818 Charlton."
- Kennedy, James Harrison (July 1885). "Bankers and Banks of Cleveland". Magazine of Western History: 272–290.
- Kennedy, James Harrison (December 1885). "A Group of Cleveland Manufacturers". Magazine of Western History: 174–182.
- Kennedy, James Harrison (1896). A History of the City of Cleveland: Its Settlement, Rise and Progress, 1796-1896. Cleveland: Imperial Press. p. 325. "Alfred Kelley Amasa Stone."
- Kerr, Daniel R. (2011). Derelict Paradise: Homelessness and Urban Development in Cleveland, Ohio. Amherst, Mass.: University of Massachusetts Press. ISBN 9781558498495.
- Knoblock, Glenn A. (2012). Historic Iron and Steel Bridges in Maine, New Hampshire and Vermont. Jefferson, N.C.: McFarland & Company. ISBN 9780786448432.
- Kohn, George C. (2001). The New Encyclopedia of American Scandal. New York: Facts on File. ISBN 9781438130224.
- Low, James W. (1862). Low's Railway Directory for 1862. New York: Wynkoop, Hallenbeck and Thomas, Printers. hdl:2027/nnc1.cu56626053.
- Ludlow, Athur Clyde (1920). The Old Stone Church: The Story of a Hundred Years, 1820-1920. Cleveland: The Premier Press.
- Lyles, James H. (1869). Official Railway Manual of the Railroads of North America. New York: Russell's American Steam Printing House. hdl:2027/mdp.39015024392816.
- MacDonald, Scott B.; Hughes, Jane E. (2015). Separating Fools From Their Money: A History of American Financial Scandals. New Brunswick, N.J.: Transaction Books. ISBN 9781412855006.
- McLellan, David; Warrick, Bill (1989). The Lake Shore & Michigan Southern Railway. Polo, Ill.: Transportation Trails. ISBN 9780933449091.
- The Merchant's and Banker's Almanac for 1864. New York: I. Smith Homans, Jr. 1864. hdl:2027/mdp.39015076038077.
- Michigan Railroad Commission (1874). First Annual Report of the Commissioner of Railroads of the State of Michigan, for the Year Ending December 31, 1872. Lansing, Mich.: W.S. George and Co., State Printers and Binders. hdl:2027/mdp.39015065192448.
- Michigan Railroad Commission (1874). Second Annual Report of the Commissioner of Railroads of the State of Michigan, for the Year Ending December 31, 1873. Lansing, Mich.: W.S. George and Co., State Printers and Binders. hdl:2027/njp.32101066784578.
- Michigan Railroad Commission (1875). Third Annual Report of the Commissioner of Railroads of the State of Michigan, for the Year Ending December 31, 1874. Lansing, Mich.: W.S. George and Co., State Printers and Binders. hdl:2027/njp.32101066784586.
- Michigan Railroad Commission (1876). Fourth Annual Report of the Commissioner of Railroads of the State of Michigan, for the Year Ending December 31, 1875. Lansing, Mich.: W.S. George and Co., State Printers and Binders. hdl:2027/njp.32101066784594.
- Michigan Railroad Commission (1877). Fifth Annual Report of the Commissioner of Railroads of the State of Michigan, for the Year Ending December 31, 1876. Lansing, Mich.: W.S. George and Co., State Printers and Binders. hdl:2027/njp.32101066784305.
- Michigan Railroad Commission (1878). Sixth Annual Report of the Commissioner of Railroads of the State of Michigan, for the Year Ending December 31, 1877. Lansing, Mich.: W.S. George and Co., State Printers and Binders. hdl:2027/coo.31924092984420.
- Michigan Railroad Commission (1879). Seventh Annual Report of the Commissioner of Railroads of the State of Michigan, for the Year Ending December 31, 1878. Lansing, Mich.: W.S. George and Co., State Printers and Binders. hdl:2027/coo.31924092984438.
- Michigan Railroad Commission (1880). Eighth Annual Report of the Commissioner of Railroads of the State of Michigan, for the Year Ending December 31, 1879. Lansing, Mich.: W.S. George and Co., State Printers and Binders. hdl:2027/njp.32101066784339.
- Michigan Railroad Commission (1881). Ninth Annual Report of the Commissioner of Railroads of the State of Michigan, for the Year Ending December 31, 1880. Lansing, Mich.: W.S. George and Co., State Printers and Binders. hdl:2027/coo.31924092984453.
- Michigan Railroad Commission (1882). Tenth Annual Report of the Commissioner of Railroads of the State of Michigan, for the Year Ending December 31, 1881. Lansing, Mich.: W.S. George and Co., State Printers and Binders. hdl:2027/njp.32101066784354.
- Michigan Railroad Commission (November 30, 1883). Eleventh Annual Report of the Commissioner of Railroads of the State of Michigan, for the Year 1882. Lansing, Mich.: W.S. George and Co., State Printers and Binders. hdl:2027/coo.31924092984479.
- Mitrani, Sam (2013). The Rise of the Chicago Police Department: Class and Conflict, 1850-1894. Urbana, Ill.: University of Illinois Press. ISBN 9780252095337.
- Morris, Charles R. (2006). The Tycoons: How Andrew Carnegie, John D. Rockefeller, Jay Gould, and J.P. Morgan Invented the American Supereconomy. New York: Owl Books. ISBN 9781429935029.
- Morton, Marian J. (1995). Women in Cleveland: An Illustrated History. Bloomington, Ind.: Indiana University Press. ISBN 9780253328960.
- Nevins, Allan (1940). John D. Rockefeller: The Heroic Age of American Enterprise. Volume 1. New York: C. Scribner's Sons.
- Ninth Annual Report of the President and Directors of the Lake Shore and Michigan Southern Railway Company to the Stockholders for the Fiscal Year Ending December 31, 1878 (Report). Cleveland: Fairbanks & Co. 1879.
- O'Toole, Patricia (1990). The Five of Hearts: An Intimate Portrait of Henry Adams and His Friends, 1880-1918. New York: Simon & Schuster. ISBN 9780743288231.
- Ohio Commissioner of Railroads and Telegraphs (1868). Annual Report of the Commissioner of Railroads and Telegraphs, to the Governor of the State of Ohio, for the Year 1867. Columbus, Ohio: L.D. Myers & Bro., State Printers.
- Ohio Commissioner of Railroads and Telegraphs (1868). Annual Report of the Commissioner of Railroads and Telegraphs of the State of Ohio, With Tabulations and Deductions From Reports of the Railroad Corporations of the State, for the Year Ending June 30, 1868. Columbus, Ohio: Columbus Printing Company, State Printers. hdl:2027/uc1.b2896930.
- Ohio Commissioner of Railroads and Telegraphs (1870). Annual Report of the Commissioner of Railroads and Telegraphs of the State of Ohio, With Tabulations and Deductions From Reports of the Railroad Corporations of the State, for the Year Ending June 30, 1869. Columbus, Ohio: Columbus Printing Company, State Printers.
- Ohio Commissioner of Railroads and Telegraphs (1871). Annual Report of the Commissioner of Railroads and Telegraphs, for the Year Ending June 30, 1870, In Two Volumes. Volume II. Columbus, Ohio: Nevins and Myers, State Printers.
- Ohio Commissioner of Railroads and Telegraphs (1872). Fifth Annual Report of the Commissioner of Railroads and Telegraphs of the State of Ohio, for the Governor, for the Year Ending June 30, 1871. Columbus, Ohio: Nevins and Myers, State Printers.
- Ohio Commissioner of Railroads and Telegraphs (1873). Sixth Annual Report of the Commissioner of Railroads and Telegraphs of Ohio for the Year Ending June 30, 1872. Columbus, Ohio: Nevins and Myers, State Printers. hdl:2027/uc1.b2896931.
- Ohio Commissioner of Railroads and Telegraphs (1874). Seventh Annual Report of the Commissioner of Railroads and Telegraphs of Ohio for the Year Ending June 30, 1873. Columbus, Ohio: Nevins and Myers, State Printers.
- Ohio Commissioner of Railroads and Telegraphs (1875). Eighth Annual Report of the Commissioner of Railroads and Telegraphs of Ohio for the Year Ending June 30, 1874. Columbus, Ohio: Nevins and Myers, State Printers.
- Ohio Commissioner of Railroads and Telegraphs (1876). Ninth Annual Report of the Commissioner of Railroads and Telegraphs of Ohio for the Year Ending June 30, 1875. Columbus, Ohio: Nevins and Myers, State Printers.
- Ohio Commissioner of Railroads and Telegraphs (1878). Eleventh Annual Report of the Commissioner of Railroads and Telegraphs of Ohio for the Year Ending June 30, 1877. Columbus, Ohio: Nevins and Myers, State Printers.
- Ohio Commissioner of Railroads and Telegraphs (1879). Twelfth Annual Report of the Commissioner of Railroads and Telegraphs of Ohio for the Year Ending June 30, 1878. Columbus, Ohio: Nevins and Myers, State Printers. hdl:2027/uc1.b2896933.
- Ohio Commissioner of Railroads and Telegraphs (1880). Thirteenth Annual Report of the Commissioner of Railroads and Telegraphs of Ohio for the Year Ending June 30, 1879. Columbus, Ohio: Nevins and Myers, State Printers. hdl:2027/uc1.b2896934.
- Ohio Commissioner of Railroads and Telegraphs (1881). Annual Report of the Commissioner of Railroads and Telegraphs of Ohio for the Year Ending June 30, 1880. Columbus, Ohio: G.J. Brand & Co., State Printers. hdl:2027/uc1.b2896935.
- Ohio Commissioner of Railroads and Telegraphs (1882). Annual Report of the Commissioner of Railroads and Telegraphs of Ohio for the Year Ending June 30, 1881. Columbus, Ohio: G.J. Brand & Co., State Printers.
- Ohio Commissioner of Railroads and Telegraphs (1883). Annual Report of the Commissioner of Railroads and Telegraphs of Ohio for the Year Ending June 30, 1882. Columbus, Ohio: Myers Brothers, State Printers. hdl:2027/uc1.b2896936.
- Ohio Commissioner of Railroads and Telegraphs (1884). Annual Report of the Commissioner of Railroads and Telegraphs of Ohio for the Year Ending June 30, 1883. Columbus, Ohio: Myers Brothers, State Printers. hdl:2027/uc1.b2896937.
- Ohio Commissioner of Railroads and Telegraphs (1888). Annual Report of the Commissioner of Railroads and Telegraphs, to the Governor of the State Ohio, for the Year 1887. Columbus, Ohio: The Westbote Company, State Printers.
- Ohio Commissioner of Railroads and Telegraphs (1901). The Thirty-Fourth Annual Report of the Commissioner of Railroads and Telegraphs, to the Governor of the State Ohio, for the Year 1901. Columbus, Ohio: F.J. Heer, State Printer.
- Ohio Historic Places Dictionary. Hamburg, Mich.: State History Publications. 2008. ISBN 9781878592705.
- Ohio Secretary of State (1882). Annual Report of the Secretary of State, to the Governor of Ohio for the Year 1881. Columbus: G.J. Brand & Co., State Printers.
- Orth, Samuel Peter (1910). A History of Cleveland, Ohio. Volume I. Chicago: S.J. Clarke Publishing Co.
- Orth, Samuel Peter (1910). A History of Cleveland, Ohio. Volume II: Biography. Chicago: S.J. Clarke Publishing Co.
- Perry, David C. (1995). "Cleveland: Journey to Maturity". In Keating, W. Dennis; Krumholz, Norman; Perry, David C. (eds.). Cleveland: A Metropolitan Reader. Kent, Ohio: Kent State University Press. ISBN 9780873384926.
- Poor, Henry V. (1868). Manual of the Railroads of the United States, 1868-69. New York: H.V. & H.W. Poor.
- Poor, Henry V. (1872). Manual of the Railroads of the United States for 1872-73. New York: H.V. & H.W. Poor. hdl:2027/uc1.b4647624.
- Railroad and Warehouse Commission (1887). Sixteenth Annual Report of the Railroad and Warehouse Commission of the State of Illinois. Springfield, Ill.: H.W. Rokker, Printer and Binder.
- Randall, Emilius Oviatt; Ryan, Daniel Joseph (1912). History of Ohio: The Rise and Progress of an American State. New York: Century History Co.
- "Real Builders of America: Amasa Stone—Bridge Builder, Railroad Constructor and Administrator". The Valve World. October 1911. pp. 689, 693.
- Renehan, Edward (2009). Commodore: The Life of Cornelius Vanderbilt. New York: Basic Books. ISBN 9780465002566.
- Robison, W. Scott (1887). History of the City of Cleveland: Its Settlement, Rise and Progress. Cleveland: Robison & Cockett. p. 362. "Children's Aid Society Detroit Street."
- Rose, William Ganson (1990). Cleveland: The Making of a City. Kent, Ohio: Kent State University Press. ISBN 9780873384285.
- Ruminski, Dan; Dutka, Alan (2012). Cleveland in the Gilded Age: A Stroll Down Millionaires' Row. Charleston, S.C.: The History Press. ISBN 9781609498788.
- Sanders, Craig (2014). Cleveland Mainline Railroads. San Francisco: Arcadia Publishing. ISBN 9781439644881.
- Sharpe, Elizabeth M. (2004). In the Shadow of the Dam: The Aftermath of the Mill River Flood of 1874. New York: Free Press. ISBN 9780743223577.
- Short, Simine (2011). Locomotive to Aeromotive: Octave Chanute and the Transportation Revolution. Urbana, Ill.: University of Illinois Press. ISBN 9780252036316.
- Simon, John Y. (2000). The Papers of Ulysses S. Grant. Volume 24. 1873. Carbondale, Ill.: Southern Illinois University Press. ISBN 9780809322770.
- Solomon, Brian (2008). North American Railroad Bridges. St. Paul, Minn.: Voyageur Press. ISBN 9780760325278.
- Starr, Timothy (2012). Railroad Wars of New York State. Charleston, S.C.: History Press. ISBN 9781609497279.
- Stiles, T.J. (2009). The First Tycoon: The Epic Life of Cornelius Vanderbilt. New York: Alfred A. Knopf. ISBN 9780375415425.
- Taliaferro, John (2013). All the Great Prizes: The Life of John Hay, from Lincoln to Roosevelt. New York: Simon & Schuster. ISBN 9781416597308.
- Tarbell, Ida M. (1904). The History of the Standard Oil Company. Volume 1. New York: McClure, Philips and Co.
- Thomas, William B. (January 1921). "Early History of the Old Bee Line R.R. and Its Completion by Hon. Alfred Kelley in 1851". The Firelands Pioneer. Norwalk, Ohio: The Firelands Historical Society. pp. 104–122.
- Vogel, Charity Ann (2013). The Angola Horror: The 1867 Train Wreck That Shocked the Nation and Transformed American Railroads. Ithaca, N.Y.: Cornell University Press. ISBN 9780801449086.
- Weinberg, Steve (2009). Taking on the Trust: The Epic Battle of Ida Tarbell and John D. Rockefeller. New York: Norton. ISBN 9780393335514.
- Wiebe, Robert H. (1967). The Search for Order, 1877-1920. New York: Hill and Wang. ISBN 9780809001040.
- Works Progress Administration (1937). Annals of Cleveland—1818-1935. Volume 50, Part 1. 1867. Cleveland: Cleveland Public Library.
- Works Progress Administration (1937). Annals of Cleveland—1818-1935. Volume 52, Part 1. 1869. Cleveland: Cleveland Public Library. hdl:2027/mdp.39015070223154.
- Works Progress Administration (1937). Annals of Cleveland—1818-1935. Volume 54, Part 1. 1871. Cleveland: Cleveland Public Library. hdl:2027/mdp.39015070223154.
- Zimmermann, Warren (2004). First Great Triumph: How Five Americans Made Their Country a World Power. New York: Farrar, Straus and Giroux. ISBN 9780374179397.
