= The Bread-Winners =

1883 novel by John Hay

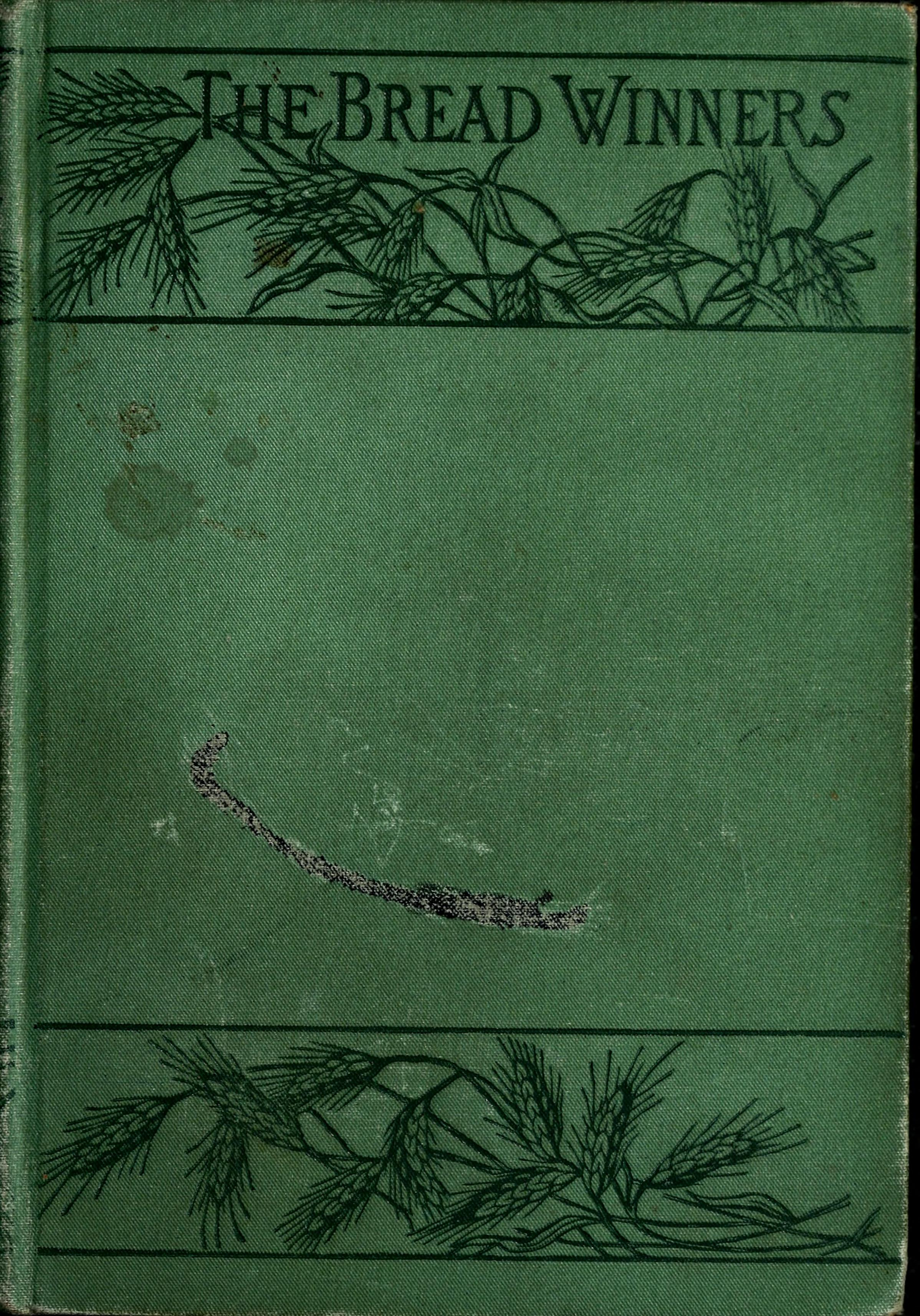
- First edition cover
- Author: John Hay
- Language: English
- Publisher: Harper & Brothers
- Publication date: 1883 as serialization; 1884 as book
- Publication place: United States
- Pages: 320
- ISBN: 978-1-4366-4739-7

The Bread-Winners: A Social Study is an 1883 novel by John Hay, former secretary to Abraham Lincoln who in 1898 became U.S. Secretary of State. The book takes an anti-organized labor stance, and when published anonymously sold well and provoked considerable public interest in determining who the author was.

The plot of the book revolves around former army captain Arthur Farnham, a wealthy resident of Buffland (an analog of Cleveland). He organizes Civil War veterans to keep the peace when the Bread-winners, a group of lazy and malcontented workers, call a violent general strike. He is sought in marriage by the ambitious Maud Matchin, daughter of a carpenter, but instead weds a woman of his own class.

Hay wrote his only novel as a reaction to several strikes that affected him and his business interests in the 1870s and early 1880s. Originally published in installments in The Century Magazine, the book attracted wide interest. Hay had left hints to his identity in the novel, and some guessed right, but he never acknowledged the book as his, and it did not appear with his name on it until after his death in 1905. Hay's hostile view of organized labor was soon seen as outdated, and the book is best remembered for its onetime popularity and controversial nature.

== Plot ==
One of the wealthiest and most cultured residents of the famed Algonquin Avenue in Buffland (a city intended to be Cleveland), Captain Arthur Farnham is a Civil War veteran and widower—his wife died of illness while accompanying him at a remote frontier post. Since he left the army, he has sought to involve himself in municipal affairs but fails through political naiveté. The victorious party has allowed him the position of chairman of the library board. In that capacity, he is approached by Maud Matchin, daughter of carpenter Saul Matchin, a man content with his lot. His daughter is not and seeks employment at the library as a means of bettering herself. Farnham agrees to put her case, but is defeated by a majority on the board, who have their own candidate. She finds herself attracted to Farnham, who is more interested in Alice Belding, daughter of his wealthy widow neighbor.

Saul Matchin had hoped his daughter would become a house servant, but having attended high school, she feels herself too good for that. She is admired by Saul's assistant Sam Sleeny, who lives with the Matchins, a match favored by her father. Sleeny is busy repairing Farnham's outbuildings, and is made jealous by interactions between the captain and Maud. Seeing Sleeny's discontent, Andrew Jackson Offitt (true name Ananias), a locksmith and "professional reformer", tries to get him to join the Bread-winners, a labor organization. Sleeny is happy with his employment, "Old Saul Matchin and me come to an agreement about time and pay, and both of us was suited. Ef he's got his heel into me, I don't feel it," but due to his unhappiness over Maud, is easy game for Offitt, who gets him to join, and to pay the dues that are Offitt's visible means of support.

Maud has become convinced she is in love with Farnham, and declares it to him. It is not reciprocated, and the scene is witnessed both by Mrs. Belding and by Sleeny. The widow believes Farnham when he states he had given Maud no encouragement, but her daughter, when her mother incautiously tells her of the incident, does not. When Farnham seeks to marry Alice, she turns him down and asks him never to renew the subject.

Offitt's membership has tired of endless talk and plans a general strike, a fact of which Farnham is informed by Mr. Temple, a salty-talking vice president of a rolling mill. An element among the strikers also plans to loot houses along Algonquin Avenue, including Farnham's. The strike begins, paralyzing Buffland's commerce, though it is initially nonviolent. Neither the mayor nor the chief of police, when approached by Farnham, are willing to guard Algonquin Avenue. Farnham proceeds to organize Civil War veterans, and purchases weapons to arm them. After Farnham's force rescues the mayor from being attacked, he deputizes them as special police—on condition there is no expense to the city.

Meanwhile, Maud tells her father she will never marry Sleeny. She is wooed by Bott, who is a spiritualist and a Bread-winner, and also by Offitt. Neither meets success, though Offitt dexterously prevents her from actually saying no, and through flattery and stories of his alleged past piques her interest.

By the end of the second day of the strike, which has spread to Buffland's rival city of Clearfield [in the serialization, "Clevealo"], the mood among the laborers has turned ugly. Temple warns that the attacks on Algonquin Avenue are imminent, and aids Farnham's force in turning back assaults on the captain's house and on the Belding residence. Bott and Sleeny are captured by the force; the former is sent to prison but Farnham has pity on Sleeny as a good workman, and the carpenter serves only a few days. The settlement of the strike in Clearfield takes the wind out of the Buffland action, and soon most are back at work, though some agitators are dismissed.

Offitt, despite being one of the leaders of the assault on the Belding house, has escaped blame and befriends the sullen Sleeny on his release. Upon learning that some workers pay their landlord, Farnham, in the evening of the rent day at his home, Offitt comes up with a scheme—rob and murder Farnham and let Sleeny take the blame as Offitt elopes with Maud. Accordingly, Offitt sneaks into Farnham's house with Sleeny's hammer, but just as he is striking the fatal blow, Alice Belding, who can see what is going on from her house through an opera glass, screams, distracting Offitt enough so that Farnham is hurt by the blow, but not killed. Offitt hurries away with the money and proceeds to frame Sleeny. After realizing Offitt's treachery, Sleeny escapes jail and kills him. The stolen money is found on Offitt's body, clearing Sleeny in the assault on Farnham, but the carpenter must still stand trial for the killing of Offitt, in which he is aided by partisan testimony from Maud. A sympathetic jury ignores the law to acquit him. Sleeny wins Maud's hand in marriage, and Farnham and Alice Belding are to be wed.

== Background ==
=== John Hay ===
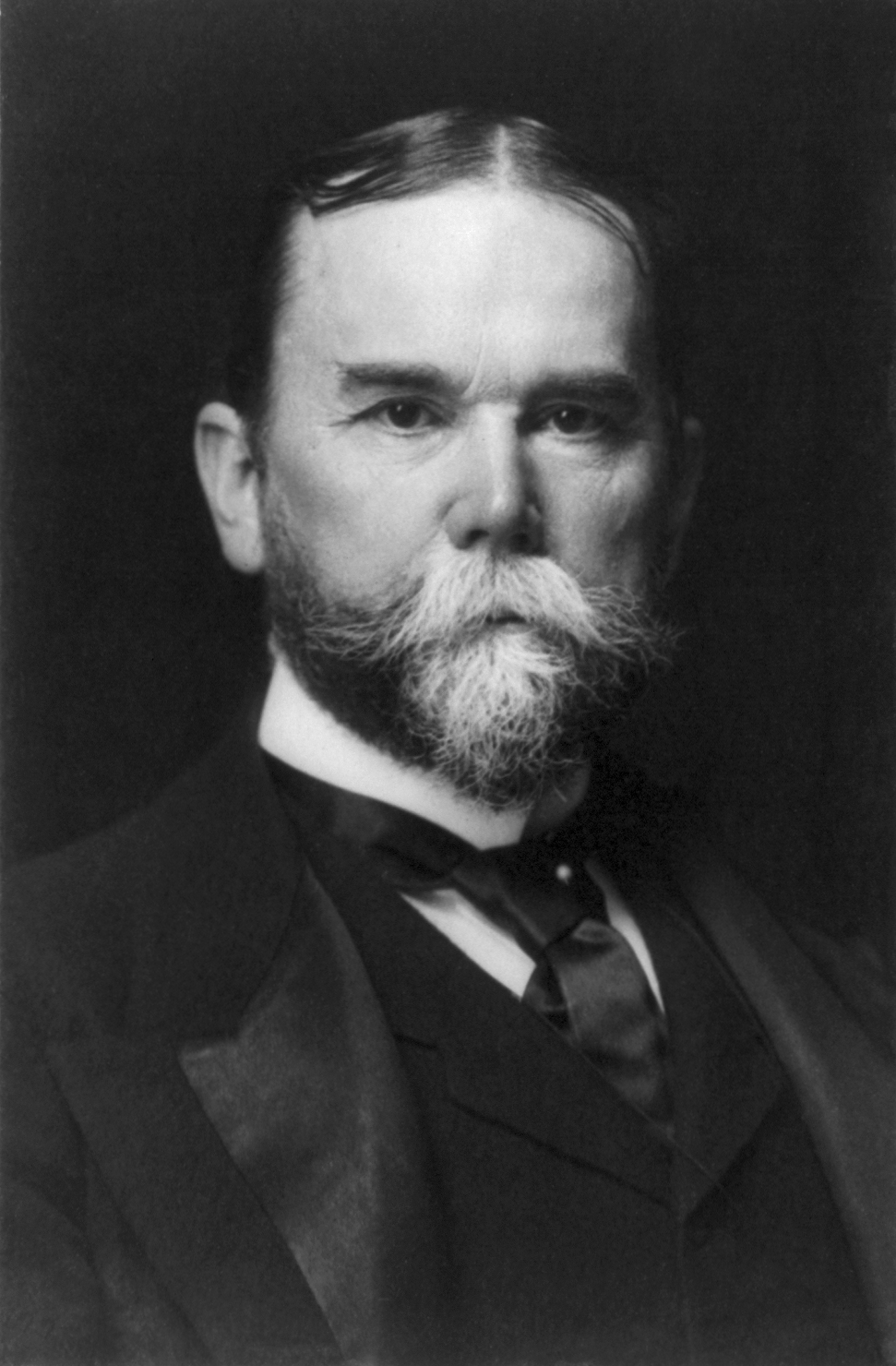
Hay in 1897

John Hay was born in Indiana in 1838, and grew up in frontier Illinois. During his apprenticeship to become a lawyer in his uncle's office in Springfield, he came to know Abraham Lincoln, and worked for his presidential campaign in 1860. He was made Lincoln's assistant personal secretary, and spent the years of the American Civil War working for him; the two men forged a close relationship.

After the war, Hay worked for several years in diplomatic posts abroad, then in 1870 became a writer for Horace Greeley's New-York Tribune, continuing there under Whitelaw Reid after Greeley's death in 1872. Hay was a gifted writer for the Tribune, but also achieved success with literary works. In 1871, he published Pike County Ballads, a group of poems written in the dialect of frontier Pike County, Illinois, where Hay had attended school. The same year, he published Castilian Days, a collection of essays on Spain, some of which had been written while Hay was posted as a diplomat in Madrid.

In 1873, Hay began to woo Clara Stone, daughter of wealthy Cleveland industrialist Amasa Stone, and wed her in 1874. The marriage made Hay wealthy. Hay and his wife moved to Cleveland, where Hay managed Amasa Stone's investments. In December 1876, a train of Stone's Lake Shore Railway was crossing a bridge when the structure collapsed. The Ashtabula River Railroad Disaster, including the subsequent fire, killed 92 people, the worst rail disaster in American history to that point. Stone held the patent for the design of the bridge and was widely blamed; he left Hay in charge of his businesses in mid-1877 as he went to travel in Europe.

Hay biographer Robert Gale recorded that between the publication of the last of Hay's short fiction in 1871 and that of his only novel in 1883, "Hay married money, entered into a lucrative business arrangement in Cleveland with his conservative father-in-law [and] joined the right wing of the Ohio Republican Party ... The Bread-Winners was written by a person made essentially different as a result of these experiences."

=== Postwar labor troubles and literary reaction ===
Although the American Civil War did not itself transform the United States from a largely agrarian to an urban society, it gave great impetus to a change already under way, especially in the North. The challenges of feeding, clothing, and equipping the Union Army caused the building or expansion of many factories and other establishments. This made many wealthy, and led to an industrialized America.

This transformation did not stop when the war ended; industrial production in the United States increased by 75% from 1865 to 1873, making the U.S. second only to Britain in manufacturing output. Railroad construction made practical the exploitation of the trans-Mississippi West. Although the railroads helped fuel an economic boom, they proved a two-edged sword in the 1870s. The 1872 Crédit Mobilier scandal, over graft in the construction of the First transcontinental railroad, shook the Grant administration to its highest levels. Railroad bankruptcies in the Panic of 1873 led to loss of jobs, wage cuts, and business failures. These disturbances culminated in the Railroad Strikes of 1877, when workers struck over cut wages and loss of jobs. The action originally started on the Baltimore & Ohio Railroad, but spread to other lines, including the Lake Shore, much to Hay's outrage. Federal troops were sent by President Rutherford B. Hayes to quash the strikes, at the cost of more than a hundred civilian lives. The Lake Shore dispute, unlike those elsewhere, was settled without violence. Hay remained angry, and blamed foreign agitators for the dispute. He condemned the "unarmed rebellion of foreign workingmen, mostly Irish" and informed Stone by letter, "the very devil seems to have entered into the lower classes of working men and there are plenty of scoundrels to encourage them to all lengths."

Public opinion was generally against the strikes in the 1877 disputes and called for them to be ended by force to preserve property and stability. The strike and its suppression featured in many books of the period, such as Thomas Stewart Denison's An Iron Crown: A Tale of the Great Republic (1885), with novelists often sympathizing with the demands of the strikers, though decrying their violence. Another labor dispute that likely affected Hay's writing of The Bread-Winners was the Cleveland Rolling Mill strike of June 1882, which occurred just before Hay first submitted his manuscript. During the dispute, union members violently attempted to prevent strikebreakers from entering the mills. A third strike that may have affected the final form of The Bread-Winners was that against Western Union in 1883—Hay was then a director of that corporation.

Gale noted that The Bread-Winners has sometimes been characterized as the first anti-labor novel, but it was preceded by Thomas Bailey Aldrich's The Stillwater Tragedy (1880). Aldrich had little knowledge of workers, and his book was not successful. Nevertheless, The Stillwater Tragedy was one of a very few novels to deal with labor unions at all, prior to Hay's book.

== Themes ==
Scott Dalrymple, in his journal article on The Bread-Winners, argues, "the brunt of Hay's ire seems aimed less toward these working men themselves than toward troublesome union organizers. Left to their own devices, Hay believes, most laborers are reasonable creatures." Hay biographers Howard L. Kushner and Anne H. Sherrill agree, writing that the author was attempting "to expose the way in which this class, due to its ignorance, fell prey to the villainies of false social reformers". To Hay, unions were dangerous as they manipulate the uneducated worker; it was better for laborers to work out their pay and conditions individually with their employer, as Sleeny does with Matchin. In his journal article, Frederic Jaher notes that Offitt, a self-described reformer, "is arrogant, tyrannical and self-righteous. Hay's message is clear: the established system needs no basic change; eliminate the agitator and harmony returns."

Offitt, at birth, was given the forenames Andrew Jackson, (Note: He is rechristened "Ananias" as a small boy after stealing money from his father. See Hay, p. 90.) which according to Hay shows that the bearer "is the son of illiterate parents, with no family pride or affections, but filled with a bitter and savage partisanship which found its expression in a servile worship of the most injurious personality in American history". Hay despised President Jackson and Jacksonian democracy, which he deemed corrupt and responsible for continuation of the slave system which Hay saw overthrown at huge cost in the American Civil War. He feared a return to values he deemed anticapitalist, and made the Bread-winners "the laziest and most incapable workmen in town", whose ideals are pre-industrialist and foreign in origin. Hay saw no excuse for violence; as the will of the people could be expressed through the ballot, the remedy for any grievances was the next election. According to Gale, Hay "never loses an opportunity to demean the Irish"—they are depicted as talkative and easily led (Offitt writes for the Irish Harp), and the reader is told that "there was not an Irish laborer in the city but knew his way to his ward club as well as to mass."

Jaher noted that Hay's view of what a worker should be is summed up in the character of Saul Matchin. Although a successful craftsman, he remains within the working class, not seeking to rise above his station, and is content with his lot. His children are not willing to remain within that class, however: the sons run away and the daughters seek to marry well, symbolizing the change being wrought by industrialization. Robert Dunne points out that the working classes are not depicted favorably in Hay's novel, but as "stupid and ill-bred, at the best loyal servants to the gentry and at the worst overly ambitious and a threat to the welfare of Buffland". Sloane considers unfavorable depictions of the working classes inevitable given the plot, and less noticeable than skewed portrayals of the wealthy in other books of the time.

Farnham and Alice Belding are the two characters in the novel who were never part of the working class, but who are scions of wealth, and they are presented favorably. Other, self-made members of the elite are depicted as more vulgar: Mrs. Belding's indulgence in gossip endangers the budding romance between her daughter and Farnham, while Mr. Temple, though brave and steadfast, can discuss only a few topics, such as horse racing, and his speech is described as peppered with profanities. The rest of Buffland's society, as displayed at a party at Temple's house, is composed of "a group of gossipy matrons, vacuous town belles, and silly swains".

== Writing ==
Hay wrote The Bread-Winners sometime during the winter or spring of 1881–82. At the time, he was busy with his part of the massive Lincoln biography he was compiling with John Nicolay, Abraham Lincoln: A History. His work on the Lincoln project had been delayed by diphtheria and attendant medical treatment, and was further delayed by The Bread-Winners, as once Hay began work on his only novel, he found himself unable to put it aside. The manuscript was completed by June 1882, when he sent it to Richard Watson Gilder, editor of The Century Magazine, though whether he was submitting it for publication or advice is unclear. Gilder called it "a powerful book", but did not immediately offer to publish it in his magazine.

Aside from his family and Gilder, likely the only person who knew that Hay was writing a novel was his friend Henry Adams. In 1880, Adams had published Democracy: An American Novel, anonymously, and when Hay arrived in Britain in July 1882, he found speculation as to its authorship to be a popular pursuit. Hay sent Adams a copy of a cheap British edition, telling him, "I think of writing a novel in a hurry and printing it as by the author of Democracy."

During the summer of 1882, Hay showed the manuscript to his friend, author William Dean Howells. Howells urged Aldrich, editor of the Atlantic Monthly, to publish it. Aldrich agreed, sight unseen, on condition that Hay allow his name to be used as author. Hay was not willing to permit this, and resubmitted the manuscript to Gilder, who agreed to Hay's condition that it be published anonymously. In an anonymous letter to The Century Magazine after the book was published, Hay alleged that he chose not to reveal his name because he was engaged in business where his stature would be diminished if it were known he had written a novel. According to Dalrymple, the likely real reason was that if it were published under Hay's name, it would harm his ambitions for office, for "to attack labor overtly, in print, would not have been politically prudent." Tyler Dennett, in his Pulitzer Prize-winning biography, speculated that Hay would not have been confirmed either as ambassador to Great Britain (1897) or as Secretary of State (1898) had senators associated him with The Bread-Winners.

Although The Bread-Winners was published anonymously, Hay left clues to his identity throughout the novel. Farnham leads the library board, as did Hay's father. Hay's brother Leonard served on the frontier, like Farnham; another brother grew exotic flowers, as does Farnham. Algonquin Avenue, analog of Cleveland's Euclid Avenue (where Hay lived), is home to the novel's protagonist. In the opening chapter, Farnham's study is described in detail and closely resembles Hay's.

== Serialization ==
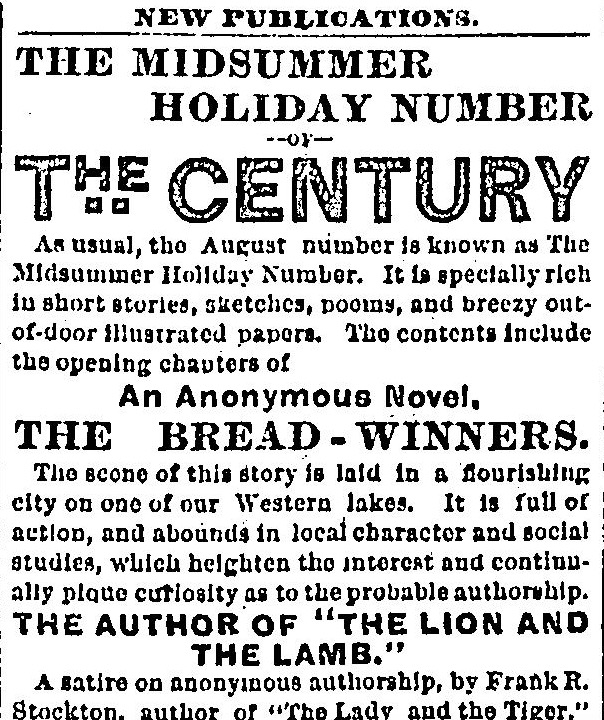
Part of The Century Company's advertisement for its August 1883 issue, featuring The Bread-Winners

In March 1883, the Century Company circulated a postcard, with copies likely sent to newspapers and potential subscribers. Under the heading "Literary Note from The Century Co.", and giving some information about the plot, it announced that an anonymous novel, "unusual in scene and subject, and powerful in treatment" would soon be serialized in the pages of the Century. The serial was originally supposed to begin in April or May, but was postponed because Frances Hodgson Burnett's novel Through One Administration ran long. On July 20, the date of release of the August number, the company placed newspaper advertisements for The Bread-Winners, and said "the story ... abounds in local description and social studies, which heighten the interest and continually pique curiosity as to its authorship." The Bread-Winners appeared in the Century from August 1883 to January 1884, when it was issued as a book by Harper and Brothers.

By July 25, 1883, Cleveland newspapers were taking note of the literary mystery, with initial guesses that the author was some former Clevelander who had moved east. In early August, the New-York Tribune reported that the author was the late Leonard Case, a Cleveland industrialist and philanthropist—the manuscript had supposedly been found among his papers. Few believed the chronically ill and introverted bachelor could have created the vivid portrait of the shapely Maud Matchin. With Case dismissed, speculation turned to other Ohioans, including Cleveland Superintendent of Schools Burke Aaron Hinsdale, former congressman Albert Gallatin Riddle (author of twelve books), and John Hay. The Boston Evening Transcript on August 18 stated, "we have an idea that none of these guesses are correct." Others suggested that the anonymous author of Democracy (Henry Adams's authorship was not yet known) had penned a second controversial work.

The furor fueled sales, with the Century later reporting that it gained 20,000 new subscribers because of the serial. The August issue of the Century, in which the first four chapters were serialized, sold out. The September issue also sold out, but went to a second printing. The Century loudly proclaimed these facts in promotional advertisements, and that it was coining money as a result. As the second installment was read, and the character of Alice Belding became prominent, there was speculation in the press that a female hand had written the novel, with suspicion falling on Constance Fenimore Woolson (great-niece of James Fenimore Cooper), whose novels were set in eastern Ohio. On September 18, the Washington correspondent for the Evening Transcript noted the resemblance of Farnham's study to Hay's. Other candidates for the authorship were Howells (though he quickly denied it) and Hay's friend Clarence King, a writer and explorer.

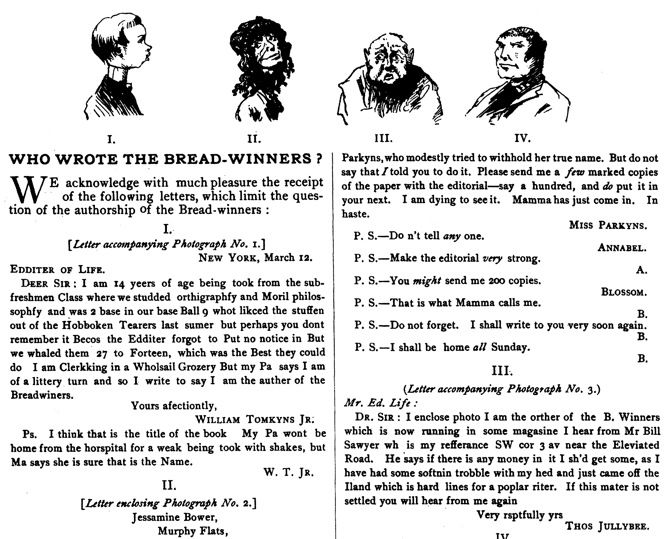
"Who wrote The Bread-Winners?": Life magazine's joking speculation (including an adolescent boy and girl as candidates), March 1884

On October 23, 1883, an interview with Hay, who had just returned from a trip to Colorado, appeared in the pages of the Cleveland Leader. Hay said such a novel would be beyond his powers, and that inaccuracies in the depiction of the local scene suggested to him that it was not written by a Clevelander. He offered no candidates who might have written it. Nevertheless, in November, the Leader ran a column speculating that Hay was the author, based on phrases used both in The Bread-Winners and in Hay's earlier book, Castilian Days, and by the fact that one character in the novel was from Salem, Indiana, Hay's birthplace. Further textual analyses led a number of newspapers in early 1884 (when the novel appeared in book form) to state it had been written by Hay.

Tiring of the guessing game, some newspapers descended to satire. The New Orleans Daily Picayune surveyed the lengthy list of candidates and announced that "the authors of The Bread Winners [sic] will all meet at Chautauqua next summer." Another columnist suggested that a statistic be put in the next census for the number of people named as the author. The appearance of President Arthur's annual message to Congress in December 1883 caused the Rochester Herald to opine that he had written The Bread-Winners "because a careful comparison of his message with the story shows many words common to both". Another Upstate New York paper, the Troy Times, evoked Parson Weems's tales of George Washington: "We cannot tell a lie. We wrote The Bread winners [sic] with our own little hatchet. If any one doubts it, we can show him the hatchet." This admission, the Buffalo Express felt, should put an end to the discussion.

== Reaction ==
=== Critical ===
The Bread-Winners received some favorable reviews, such as that by GP Lathrop in Atlantic Monthly in May 1884. Lathrop applauded the author's portrayal of the characters, and suggested that Maud Matchin was a notable addition to the "gallery of national types" in American literature. The Century reviewed the book the same month, in an article written by Howells, though he signed it only "W". He saw Maud as "the great discovery of the book" and applauded it as a treatment of an area of American life not previously written about. Similarly, a reviewer for Harper's Magazine liked the parts of the novel set among the lower classes.

According to David E. E. Sloane, "most American critics found it harder to overlook the coarseness of the book and its treatment of the labor problem." A reviewer for Literary World in January 1884 called The Bread-Winners a "greasy, slangy, malodorous book ... repulsive from the very first step." The Dial, the following month, praised the author's use of language but deemed the book "a preposterous tissue of incidents" populated by two sets of "exaggerated types", one vicious, the other absurd. Continent, also in February 1884, suggested that "the criticisms as a whole are severe, and justly so, the book being, with all its brilliancy, faithless and hopeless." The Springfield Republic suggested the author had "no sympathies beyond the circles of wealth and refinement", from which "the workingman is either a murderous ruffian, or a senseless dupe, or a stolid, well-meaning drudge, while the man of wealth is, necessarily, a refined, cultivated hero, handsome, stylish, fascinating." A letter in The Century Magazine deemed the novel "a piece of snobbishness imported from England ... It is simply untruthful ... to continue the assertion that trade unions are mainly controlled and strikes originated by agitators, interested only for what they make out of them."

British critics were generally more favorable toward the book. In a column in the Pall Mall Gazette, The Bread-Winners was seen as "eminently clever and readable, a worthy contribution to that American novel-literature which is at the present day, on the whole, ahead of our own", a statement which Harper's used in advertisements. A reviewer for London's Saturday Review described the book as "one of the strongest and most striking stories of the last ten years".

=== Responses ===
Hay's novel provoked several works in response. Ohio Congressman Martin Foran announced in March 1884 that he would write a book rebutting the author's view of labor, and published it in 1886 under the title The Other Side. Harriet Boomer Barber (writing under the pen name Faith Templeton) kept a number of Hay's characters, while "turning the American industrial world into a sort of Christian utopia" in her Drafted In (1888). Stephen Crane's 1895 short story, "A Christmas Dinner Won in Battle" satirizes The Bread-Winners.

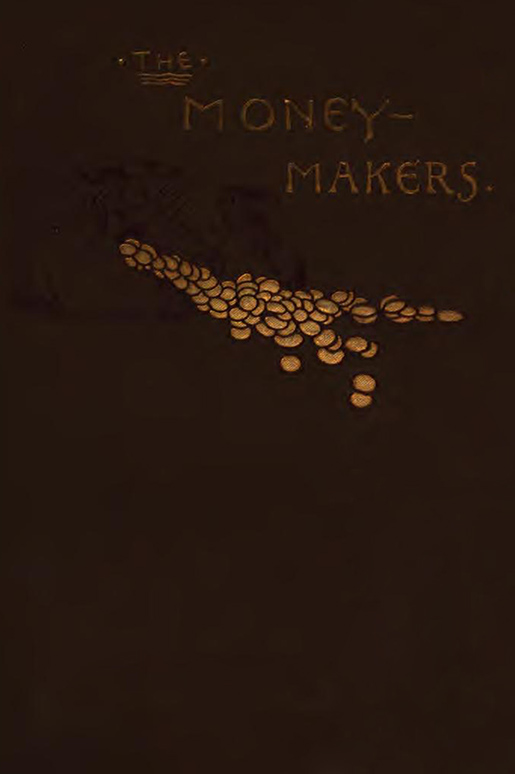
H.F. Keenan's The Money-Makers was the most successful novel published in response to The Bread-Winners.

The most successful response was The Money-Makers (1885), published anonymously by Henry Francis Keenan, a former colleague of Hay's at the New-York Tribune. Keenan's work left little doubt that he had fixed on Hay as author of The Bread-Winners, as it contains characters clearly evoking Hay, his family, and associates. Aaron Grimestone parallels Amasa Stone, Hay's father-in-law. When the Academy Opera House collapses, taking hundreds of lives, Grimestone is deemed responsible for its faulty construction—as Stone was for the deaths in the Ashtabula railway disaster. Grimestone eventually commits suicide by shooting himself in his bathroom, as did Stone in 1883. His daughter Eleanor parallels Clara Stone Hay, and Keenan's descriptions of Eleanor make it clear she is, like Clara, heavyset. The character Archibald Hilliard is modeled after Hay, and the description of his appearance is that of Hay even to the mustache. Hilliard was a secretary to a high official in Washington, and later a diplomat and editor, entering journalism in the same year as Hay. Hilliard becomes a brilliant writer at the Atlas, a reforming New York paper like the Tribune, under the editorship of Horatio Blackdaw, that is, Tribune editor Whitelaw Reid. Although she is not physically attractive to him, Hilliard woos Eleanor, convincing himself he is not merely a fortune seeker.

When Hay received a copy of The Money-Makers, according to later accounts, he is said to have hurried to New York to buy up as many copies as he could. He wrote the publisher, William Henry Appleton, complaining about the "savage libel" against Amasa Stone. Appleton agreed to several changes, including the manner of suicide, and undertook not to advertise the book further. Later in 1885, a laudatory biographical sketch of Stone, written by "J.H.", appeared in the Magazine of Western History, attributing Stone's suicide to insomnia. According to Clifford A. Bender in his journal article on the Keenan book, "the principal reason The Money-Makers has remained in obscurity seems to be that John Hay suppressed it," and though he deemed it superior to The Bread-Winners, Dalrymple suggests that Keenan's book "seems more the product of a personal vendetta than an ideological disagreement".

== Publication and aftermath ==
By the standards of the day, The Bread-Winners was a modest bestseller, with 25,000 copies sold in the United States by mid-1885. Two editions were published in Britain and a pirated edition in Canada, along with a reported sale of 3,000 in the Australian colonies. Translations were published in French, German, and Swedish. By comparison, Adams's Democracy sold only 14,000 copies in the U.S., and took four years to do so. Nevertheless, The Bread-Winners did not compare with the leading bestsellers of the 1880s, such as Lew Wallace's Ben Hur: A Tale of the Christ (1880), which sold 290,000 copies by 1888, and Edward Bellamy's story of the future, Looking Backward (1887), which sold nearly 1 million copies in its first decade.

John Hay never acknowledged the book, nor was it attributed to him in his lifetime; as Gilder put it, "guessing right isn't finding out." Hay and Adams amused themselves by suggesting the other might have written it, with Hay writing to his friend, "if you have been guilty of this ... libel upon Cleveland, there is no condonement possible in this or any subsequent worlds." At Hay's death in 1905, obituarists were uncertain whether to assign the novel to him, an exception being The New York Times, which used handwriting analysis to link the book to him, and published it in its entirety over six Sundays later that year. In 1907, with the permission of Clara Hay, the book was officially acknowledged as his, and in 1916 it was republished in John Hay's name, with an introduction by his son, Clarence.

== Historical view ==
Jaher opined that the book became antiquated as America evolved an understanding of industrial problems, and found Hay's view of labor superficial. Accordingly, the book had little lasting influence, and is remembered only for its onetime popularity and controversy. According to Dalrymple, "the anti-labor novels fail to hold up particularly well. None is a masterpiece of language, plotting, or characterization. Ideologically all seem quite heavy-handed, choosing to make their points with a nearly complete lack of subtlety."

Because of his prominence as a statesman, Hay has had a number of biographers in the century since his death. Sloane suggested that early biographers, aware of the nature of the novel's themes, were defensive in their treatment of it. Lorenzo Sears, for example, who wrote of Hay in 1915, called The Bread-Winners one of several "waifs and strays" of Hay's literary career. Dennett, writing in 1933, deemed the book Hay's honest effort to set forth a problem he could not solve. Other historians were more hostile: Vernon L. Parrington in 1930 called it a "dishonest book" and "a grotesque fabric smeared with unctuous morality". More recently, Gale (writing in 1978) described it as "a timely, popular and controversial novel that still rewards the sympathetic reader", while Hay's most recent biographer, John Taliaferro (2013), deemed it "certainly no love letter to [Cleveland]".

== Bibliography ==
=== Books ===
- Gale, Robert L (1978). John Hay. American Authors. Boston: Twayne Publishers. ISBN 0-8057-7199-9.
- Hay, John (1883). The Bread-Winners: A Social Study. New York: Harper & Brothers.
- Kushner, Howard I; Sherrill, Anne Hummel (1977). John Milton Hay: The Union of Poetry and Politics. World Leaders. Boston: Twayne Publishers. ISBN 0-8057-7719-9.
- Taliaferro, John (2013). All the Great Prizes: The Life of John Hay, From Lincoln to Roosevelt (Kindle ed.). New York: Simon & Schuster. ISBN 978-1-4165-9741-4.
- Zeitz, Joshua (2014). Lincoln's Boys: John Hay, John Nicolay, and the War for Lincoln's Image (Kindle ed.). New York: Viking Penguin. ISBN 978-1-101-63807-1.

=== Journals and other sources ===
- Bender, Clifford A (May 1926). "Another Forgotten Novel". Modern Language Notes. 41 (5): 319–22. doi:10.2307/2914050. JSTOR 2914050. (subscription required)
- Dalrymple, Scott (Fall 1999). "John Hay's Revenge: Anti-Labor Novels, 1880–1905" (PDF). Business and Economic History. 28 (1): 133–42. Archived from the original (PDF) on May 14, 2013.
- Dunne, Robert (Spring 1996). "Dueling Ideologies of America in The Bread-Winner and The Money-Makers". American Literary Realism, 1870–1910. 28 (3): 30–37. JSTOR 27746664. (subscription required)
- Jaher, Frederic Cople (Spring 1972). "Industrialism and the American Aristocrat: A Social Study of John Hay and His Novel, the Bread-Winners". Journal of the Illinois State Historical Society. 65 (1): 69–93. JSTOR 40190942. (subscription required)
- Sloane, David E. E (Fall 1969). "John Hay's The Bread-Winners as Literary Realism". American Literary Realism, 1870–1910. 2 (3): 276–79. JSTOR 27747664. (subscription required)
- ——— (Spring 1970). "John Hay (1838–1905)". American Literary Realism, 1870–1910. 3 (2): 178–88. JSTOR 27747706. (subscription required)
- Vandersee, Charles (Summer 1974). "The Great Literary Mystery of the Gilded Age". American Literary Realism, 1870–1910. 7 (3): 244–72. JSTOR 27747927. (subscription required)
