= Patricia O'Toole =

American historian

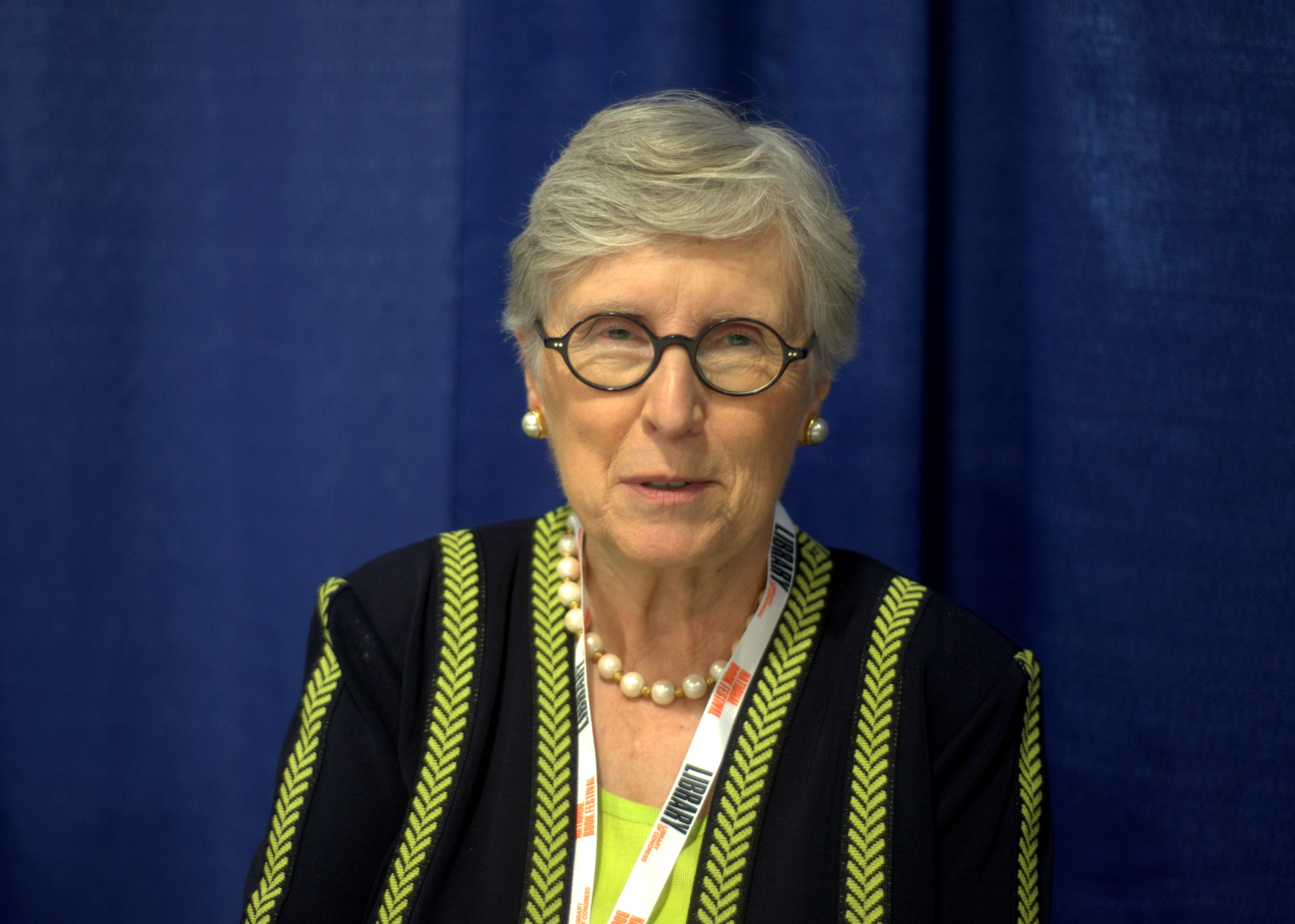
- Occupation: Historian
- Writing career
- Subject: History

Patricia O'Toole is an American historian and writer best known for her book about Henry Adams, The Five of Hearts.

O'Toole is a Society of American Historians fellow and was a visitor at the Institute for Advanced Study. She previous taught at the School of the Arts at Columbia University. She is most famous for her book The Five of Hearts: An Intimate Portrait of Henry Adams and His Friends, which was Pulitzer Prize finalist in 1991, National Book Critics Circle Award finalist in 1990, and a Los Angeles Times Book Prize finalist in 1990.

O'Toole lives in Camden, Maine.

== Works ==
Title	Year	ISBN	Publisher	Subject matter	Interviews, presentations, reviews, and comments
The Five of Hearts: An Intimate Portrait of Henry Adams and His Friends, 1880-1918	1990	ISBN 978-0-517-56350-2	Clarkson Potter	Henry Adams, Clover Adams, John Hay, Clara Stone Hay, Clarence King	Nominated for the Pulitzer Prize for Biography or Autobiography in 1991.
Money & Morals in America: A History	1998	ISBN 9780517586938	Clarkson Potter		Booknotes interview with O'Toole on Money & Morals in America, August 16, 1998, C-SPAN
When Trumpets Call: Theodore Roosevelt after the White House	2005	ISBN 978-0-684-86477-8	Simon & Schuster	Theodore Roosevelt	After Words interview with O'Toole on When Trumpets Call, June 12, 2005, C-SPAN
In the Words of Theodore Roosevelt: Quotations From the Man in the Arena	2012	ISBN 9780801465970	Cornell University Press	Theodore Roosevelt	
The Moralist: Woodrow Wilson and the World He Made	2018	ISBN 978-0-7432-9809-4	Simon & Schuster	Woodrow Wilson	KTSA interview with O'Toole on The Moralist; WICN interview with O'Toole on The Moralist, April 29, 2018; Szalai, Jennifer (May 1, 2018). "In 'The Moralist,' Woodrow Wilson and the Hazards of Idealism". Goulden, Joseph C. (April 11, 2018). "A president with failings of his own making". The Washington Times. THE MORALIST by Patricia O'Toole. February 6, 2018. Presentation by O'Toole on The Moralist, May 7, 2018, C-SPAN; Q&A interview with O'Toole on The Moralist, June 3, 2018, C-SPAN; Presentation by O'Toole on The Moralist, September 1, 2018, C-SPAN
