= Henry Francis Keenan =

American journalist

Henry Francis Keenan (May 4, 1850(?) – March 7, 1928) was an American author, best known for his anonymously-published The Money-Makers (1885), a response to John Hay's The Bread-Winners (1883).

Keenan was born to Irish immigrants in Rochester, New York about 1850. Though perhaps as young as age 14, he joined the United States Army during the American Civil War. After returning to Rochester he embarked on a career in journalism, starting at the Rochester Chronicle before moving on to publications in Indianapolis (where he served as editor of the Indianapolis Sentinel) and New York City. He turned to writing novels full-time in 1883.

== Selected bibliography ==
- Trajan (1885)
- The Money-Makers (1885)
- The Aliens (1886)
- The Iron Game (1891)
- The Conflict with Spain (1898) (a history of the Spanish–American War)

== See also ==
- Responses section of The Bread-Winners
