= Jim Bludso =

1917 film directed by Tod Browning

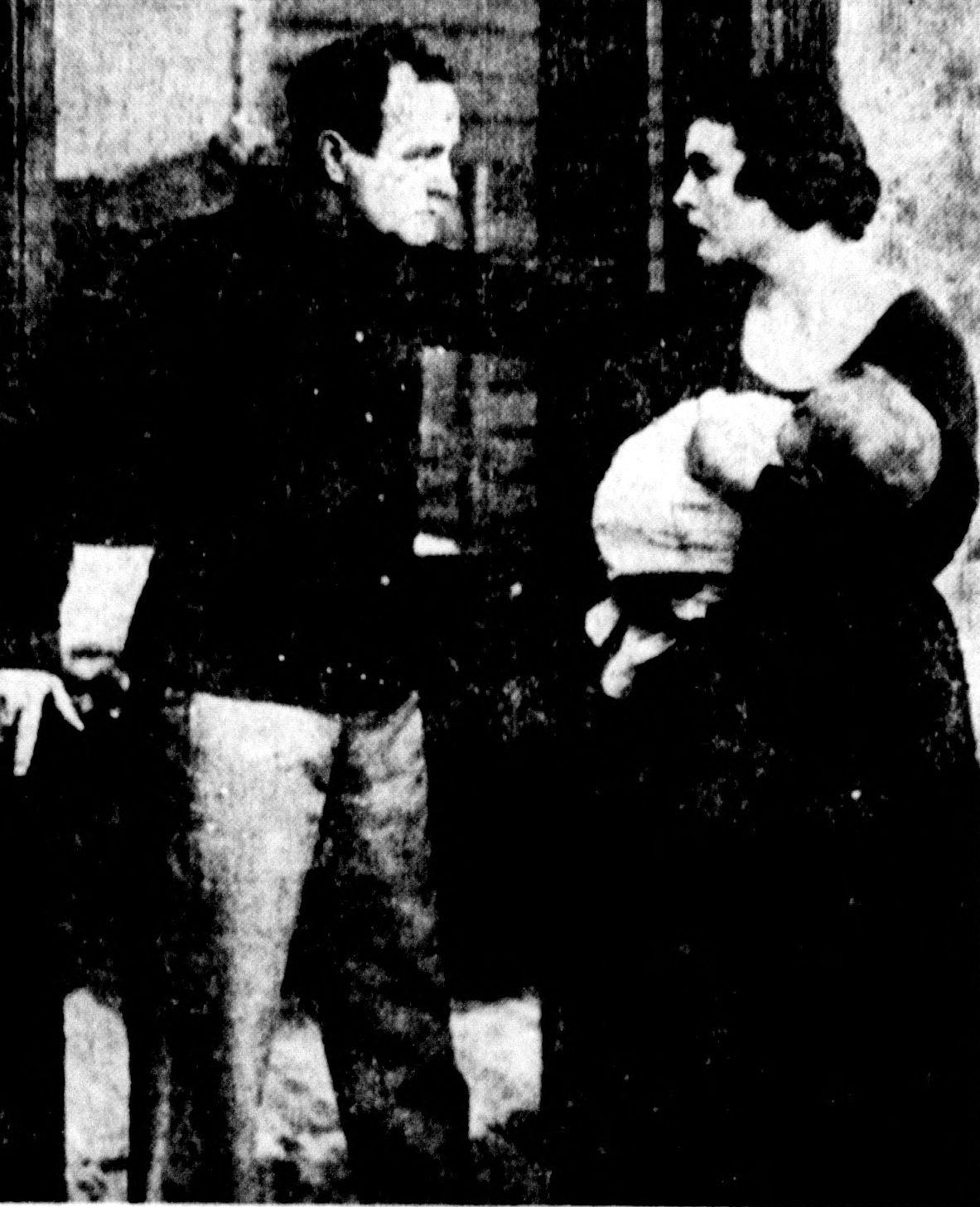
- Scene from the film, published in a newspaper.
- Directed by: Tod Browning; Wilfred Lucas
- Written by: Tod Browning; John Hay; I.N. Morris
- Produced by: Fine Arts Film Company
- Starring: Wilfred Lucas; Olga Grey
- Cinematography: Alfred Gosden
- Distributed by: Triangle Film Corporation
- Release date: February 4, 1917
- Running time: 5 reels
- Country: United States
- Language: Silent with English intertitles

Jim Bludso is a 1917 American drama film directed by Tod Browning. It was Browning's first feature film as a director.

Contemporary sources are variable on the matter of whether the direction was a joint effort between Browning and the film's star, Wilfred Lucas. In their book Dark Carnival: The Secret World of Tod Browning, Hollywood's Master of the Macabre, David J. Skal and Elias Savada suggest that Lucas' name was added to the credit for contractual reasons, and that Browning directed Jim Bludso alone. As Jim Bludso is presumed lost, it is uncertain what the original title card might have read in terms of directorial credit. The film was produced by the Fine Arts unit within the Triangle Film Corporation, the same studio that made the popular Douglas Fairbanks comedies for Triangle, for whom Browning had previously worked as a scenarist.

== Plot ==
Engineer Jim Bludso and his sidekick, Banty Tim, return to Gilgal, Illinois after the end of the American Civil War. Upon arrival, they discover that Jim's wife, Gabrielle, has left him for another man and abandoned their son. Kate Taggart, the daughter of a storekeeper in town, takes pity on Jim and they develop a fondness for one another. Gabrielle, now dumped, returns and Jim forgives her and resumes their married life. Meanwhile, a flood is coming, and Ben Merrill—constructor of Gilgal's levee—knows the structure won't hold against the tide, so he willfully causes it to fail and plans to blame the resulting catastrophe on Jim and Banty Tim. Gabrielle is mortally wounded in the flood, and her dying words implicate Merrill and identify him as the man who wooed her away from her family. Jim is on board the boat Prairie Bell when this news reaches him, as is Merrill; they get into a fight, and Prairie Bell bursts into flames and explodes. Jim is rescued and returns to Gilgal to marry Kate.

== Cast ==
- Wilfred Lucas as Jim Bludso
- Olga Grey as Gabrielle
- Georgie Stone as "Little Breeches"
- Charles Lee as Tom Taggart
- Winifred Westover as Kate Taggart
- Sam De Grasse as Ben Merrill
- James O'Shea as Tim "Banty Tim"
- Monte Blue as Joe Bower
- Al Joy as Gambler
- Lillian Langdon
- Bert Woodruff

== Adaptation ==
Jim Bludso was a poem from the Pike County Ballads of John Hay, a familiar set piece in the repertoire of elocutionists, actors and other public speakers; the Kalem Company had already made a one-reeler out of the same property in 1912. For the film, Browning fashioned his script from both Jim Bludso and another poem, Little Breeches. Much of the film's dramatic arc also came from a 1903 stage play adaptation by I.N. Morris. Hay's original poem memorialized Jim Bludso's courage and selflessness in sacrificing his own life so that the passengers on his burning boat might survive. For the film, a happy ending was devised and an entirely different set of circumstances led to the demise of Prairie Bell, which Bludso is piloting in Hay's poem.

== Reception ==
Film historian Bernd Herzogenrath reports that “By 1919, [two years] after profitable movies such as Jim Bludso (1917), Browning was an established and successful director and script writer.”

== See also ==
- List of lost films
