= Abraham Lincoln: A History =

1890 biography of Abraham Lincoln

- Authors: John Nicolay and John Hay
- Language: English
- Subject: Bibliography
- Published: 1890
- Publication place: United States
- Media type: Print
- Dewey Decimal: 973.70924
- LC Class: E457
- Text: Abraham Lincoln: A History at Wikisource

Abraham Lincoln: A History is an 1890 ten-volume account of the life and times of Abraham Lincoln, written by John Nicolay and John Hay, who were his personal secretaries during the American Civil War.

== Writing history ==
Early in his presidency, Hay and Nicolay requested and received permission from Lincoln to write his biography. In the first years after Lincoln's death, Hay and Nicolay were not encouraged to publish such a work—Representative Isaac Newton Arnold, a Lincoln supporter, had quickly published a substantial Lincoln biography, and publishers were not eager for another. Further, the permission of Robert Lincoln, who controlled his father's papers, would have to be gained. Lincoln's former secretaries decided to wait until they had sufficient time and money.

The often-dormant proposal to write the biography was given new impetus as they came to believe Lincoln's historical image was being distorted. Ward Hill Lamon in 1872 published a biography of Lincoln based on research by William Herndon, Lincoln's law partner. Lamon's book first made widely known many of the early accounts of Lincoln's life, such as those regarding Ann Rutledge, whom Lamon related Lincoln had loved and whose death devastated him. Without access to his papers, these early biographers focused on episodes told of the young Lincoln that fascinated the public. The Lincoln family believed that some of these were distorted or untrue, and in any event disrespectful. Also becoming popular were interpretations of the war that minimized Southern blame, with the bravery of the soldiers stressed in the name of sectional reconciliation. Popular fiction, such as that by Joel Chandler Harris, pressed a nostalgic view of the Old South.

By 1872, Hay was "convinced that we ought to be at work on our 'Lincoln.' I don't think the time for publication has come, but the time for preparation is slipping away." Robert Lincoln, Lincoln's surviving child, in 1874 formally agreed to let Hay and Nicolay use his father's papers; by 1875, they were engaged in research. Hay and Nicolay enjoyed exclusive access to Lincoln's papers, which were not opened to other researchers until 1947. They gathered documents written by others, as well as many of the Civil War books already being published. On rare occasions they relied on memory, such as Nicolay's recollection of the moment at the 1860 Republican convention when Lincoln was nominated, but for the most part they relied on research. The research was so extensive that, in their published volumes, Hay and Nicolay sometimes wrote that no records existed on certain points—statements that proved to be premature.

Hay began his part of the writing in 1876; the work was interrupted by illnesses of Hay, Nicolay, or family members, or by Hay's writing of The Bread-Winners. When Hay was in Washington as Assistant Secretary of State in 1879–81, and after Hay returned to Washington in 1885, he and Nicolay (then the Marshal of the Supreme Court) would walk to each other's house with chapter drafts or research materials. In 1881, after his temporary service as editor of the Tribune in Whitelaw Reid's absence, he agreed to do unsigned Civil War book reviews for the Tribune, but when asked to do obituaries as well, he refused, "I have not read any thing this winter except what bears on one subject".

By 1885, Hay had completed the chapters on Lincoln's early life, and they were submitted to Robert Lincoln. Robert retained the right of approval of the text, and required a number of changes; for example, he felt the depiction of Lincoln's father Thomas showed him as too shiftless. Sometimes Hay and Nicolay alternated chapters, and sometimes one took responsibility for an entire volume.

== Publication ==
Sale of the serialization rights to The Century magazine, edited by Hay's friend Richard Watson Gilder, helped give Hay and Nicolay the impetus to bring what had become a massive project to a whole. Gilder, for his part, tried to keep the perspective from becoming too partisan in favor of the North, as The Century was a national magazine with a diverse readership.

The published work, Abraham Lincoln: A History, has an alternation of parts in which Lincoln is at center, and discussions of contextual matters such as legislative events or battles. The first serial installment, published in November 1886, received positive reviews, though some, including Herndon, considered the contextual sections dull. Life magazine proposed a party game, to locate five references to Lincoln in a given installment, assuming there were any to be found. When the ten-volume set emerged in 1890, it was not sold in bookstores, but instead door-to-door, the practice followed then by noted authors like Twain. Despite a price of $50, and the fact that a good part of the work had been serialized, five thousand copies were quickly sold.

== Interpretation ==
Robert L. Gale noted that Hay and Nicolay "emerge as Protestant Christian defenders of Unionism, of Constitutional abolition [of slavery], of the Republican party, and of a martyred president who was almost divine because of the comprehensiveness of his supernal intelligence and charitable heart." Kushner and Sherrill opined that the biography "became the Lincoln gospel according to St. John and St. Nico, who like 'two everlasting Angels,' would transmit to their fellows the truth about their hero". According to historian Joshua Zeitz:

Writing against the rising currents of Southern apologia, Hay and Nicolay pioneered the "Northern" interpretation of the Civil War [and] helped invent the Lincoln we know today—the sage father figure; the military genius; the greatest American orator; the master of a fractious cabinet who forged a "team of rivals" out of erstwhile challengers for the throne; the Lincoln Memorial Lincoln. That Abraham Lincoln was all of these things, in some measure, there can be no doubt. But it is easy to forget how widely underrated Lincoln the president and Lincoln the man were at the time of his death and how successful Hay and Nicolay were in elevating his place in the nation's collective historical memory.

== Bibliography ==
Books

- Burlingame, Michael (2007). Abraham Lincoln: The Observations of John G. Nicolay and John Hay. Carbondale, Illinois: Southern Illinois University Press. ISBN 978-0-8093-3863-4.
- Gale, Robert L. (1978). John Hay. Twayne's American Authors. Boston: Twayne Publishers. ISBN 0-8057-7199-9.
- Kushner, Howard I.; Sherrill, Anne Hummel (1977). John Milton Hay: The Union of Poetry and Politics. Twayne's World Leaders. Boston: Twayne Publishers. ISBN 0-8057-7719-9.
- Taliaferro, John (2013). All the Great Prizes: The Life of John Hay, From Lincoln to Roosevelt (Kindle ed.). New York: Simon & Schuster. ISBN 978-1-4165-9741-4.
- Zeitz, Joshua (2014). Lincoln's Boys: John Hay, John Nicolay, and the War for Lincoln's Image (Kindle ed.). New York: Viking Penguin. ISBN 978-1-101-63807-1.

Journals and other sources

- Monteiro, George (February 1976). "John Hay and the Union Generals". Journal of the Illinois State Historical Society. 69 (1): 46–66. JSTOR 40191692.(subscription required)
- Zeitz, Joshua (February 2014). "Lincoln's Boys: John Hay, John Nicolay and the War For Lincoln's Image". Smithsonian. 44 (10).

== Versions online ==
- Abraham Lincoln: A History public domain audiobook at LibriVox

The ten volume work by John George Nicolay and John Milton Hay, originally published in 1890, is in the public domain :

- Nicolay, John George; Hay, John (1914). Abraham Lincoln : a history, Vol I. New York : The Century Co.
- —— (1914). Abraham Lincoln : a history, Vol II. New York : The Century Co.
- —— (1914). Abraham Lincoln : a history, Vol III. New York : The Century Co.
- —— (1914). Abraham Lincoln : a history, Vol IV. New York : The Century Co.
- —— (1914). Abraham Lincoln : a history, Vol V. New York : The Century Co.
- —— (1914). Abraham Lincoln : a history, Vol VI. New York : The Century Co.
- —— (1914). Abraham Lincoln : a history, Vol VII. New York : The Century Co.
- —— (1914). Abraham Lincoln : a history, Vol VIII. New York : The Century Co.
- —— (1914). Abraham Lincoln : a history, Vol IX. New York : The Century Co.
- —— (1914). Abraham Lincoln : a history, Vol X. New York : The Century Co.
