= John George Nicolay =

German-American civil servant and author (1832–1901)

- Portrait by Brady c. 1860s

2nd Marshal of the United States Supreme Court
- In office 1872–1887
- Preceded by: Richard C. Parsons
- Succeeded by: John M. Wright

Private Secretary to the President
- In office March 4, 1861 – April 15, 1865 Serving with John Hay
- President: Abraham Lincoln
- Preceded by: James Buchanan III
- Succeeded by: William A. Browning

Personal details
- Born: February 26, 1832 Essingen, Kingdom of Bavaria
- Died: September 26, 1901 (aged 69) Washington, D.C., U.S.
- Resting place: Oak Hill Cemetery; Washington, D.C., U.S.
- Occupation: Newspaper editor, diplomat

John George Nicolay (February 26, 1832 – September 26, 1901) was a German-born American author and diplomat who served as private secretary to U.S. president Abraham Lincoln and later, with John Hay, co-authored Abraham Lincoln: A History, a ten-volume biography of the 16th president. He was a member of the German branch of the Nicolay family.

== Early life ==
Nicolay was born Johann Georg Nicolai in Essingen, Kingdom of Bavaria. In 1838, he immigrated to the United States with his father and attended school in Cincinnati, Ohio.

== Career ==
Nicolay moved to Illinois, where he edited the Pike County Free Press at Pittsfield, Illinois, and he became a political power in the state. In Illinois, he became assistant to the secretary of state. While in this position, he met Abraham Lincoln, and became his devoted supporter. In 1852, he was granted a U.S. patent "for improvement in printing presses".

Group portrait of Lincoln and his secretaries, Nicolay (left) and John Hay, by Alexander Gardner, November 8, 1863

In 1861, Lincoln appointed Nicolay as his private secretary, which was the first official act of his new administration. Nicolay served in this capacity until Lincoln's death in 1865. Twice Lincoln sent Nicolay to record treaties with Native Americans. In 1862, he went to Minnesota for a Chippewa treaty that was delayed because of the Santee Sioux uprising. The next year he traveled to Colorado for the Ute Treaty. Shortly before his assassination, Lincoln appointed Nicolay to a diplomatic post in France.

Regarding Nicolay, his assistant William Stoddard, had the following to say about the responsibilities placed in the hands of his friend, "vast power for good or evil which is placed in the hands of a man constantly in the President's confidence, able at any time to 'obtain his ear,' sure to be listened to without suspicion or prejudice, and always in possession of current State secrets."

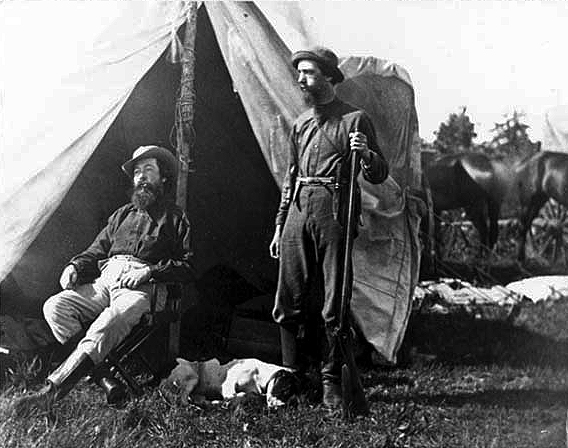
U.S. Indian Commissioner William P. Dole seated, John G. Nicolay standing at Big Lake encampment, Sherburne County, Minnesota, mid-August 1862. They were en route to make a treaty with the Chippewa on the Red River that was postponed due to the Uprising. Nicolay had been sent as Lincoln's personal representative to the Chippewa.

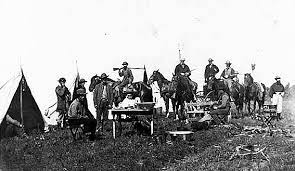
U.S. Chippewa treaty Commission led by William P. Dole in camp at Big Lake, Sherburne County; John G. Nicolay on horse at left, 1862.

After the death of the president, Nicolay became United States Consul at Paris, France (1865–69). For some time after his return to the United States, he edited the Chicago Republican. He was also the marshal of the United States Supreme Court (1872–1887). In 1881, Nicolay wrote The Outbreak of Rebellion.

Nicolay and John Hay, who had worked with Nicolay as assistant secretary to Lincoln, collaborated on Abraham Lincoln: A History. It appeared in The Century Magazine serially from 1886 to 1890 and was issued (1890–94) in book form as 10 volumes, together with the two-volume Complete Works of Abraham Lincoln. The resulting biography is an important resource on Lincoln and his times. Nicolay and Hay also edited Lincoln's Works in 12 volumes published in 1905 after Nicolay’s death.

Nicolay came to admire and revere Lincoln:

While I can confirm everything the books say about his greatness, I can also personally bear witness that he was at the same time one of the kindest, most humane and best men that ever lived. He was always gentle and never severe, always anxious to praise and never to blame, always eager to reward and slow to punish. Throughout the long and difficult years of his administration and the fluctuating vicissitudes of the war, through disappointment as well as success, through defeat as well as victory, dealing day by day with some of the most momentous acts of American history, wielding a power greater than that of European monarchs, he continued always to be the same plain, kind, unassuming, good man as when he lived in his father's cabin or sat in the quiet of his Springfield law office.

In 1912, Nicolay's daughter, Helen Nicolay (1866–1954), published Personal Traits of Abraham Lincoln. The book was based on envelopes of material that Nicolay had collected but was unable to use in the biography of Lincoln that he wrote with Hay. Helen Nicolay wrote in the preface to the book that the envelopes contained "miscellaneous notes, personal jottings, private letters, and newspaper clippings." In 1949, Helen Nicolay published a biography of her father.

Joshua M. Zeitz writes, "Above all, Nicolay and Hay created a master narrative whose influence would ebb and flow over the years but that continues to command serious scrutiny and engagement".... Early in the writing process, Nicolay assured Robert Todd Lincoln:

We hold that your father was something more than a mere make-weight in the cabinet.... We want to show that he formed a cabinet of strong and great men—rarely equaled in any historical era—and that he held, guided, controlled, curbed and dismissed not only them but other high officers civilian and military, at will, with perfect knowledge of men.

Nicolay was a founding member of the Literary Society of Washington in 1874, according to a book about the society written by his daughter Helen Nicolay. Both Nicolay and Hay were members of long standing in the society.

== Death ==
Nicolay later in life

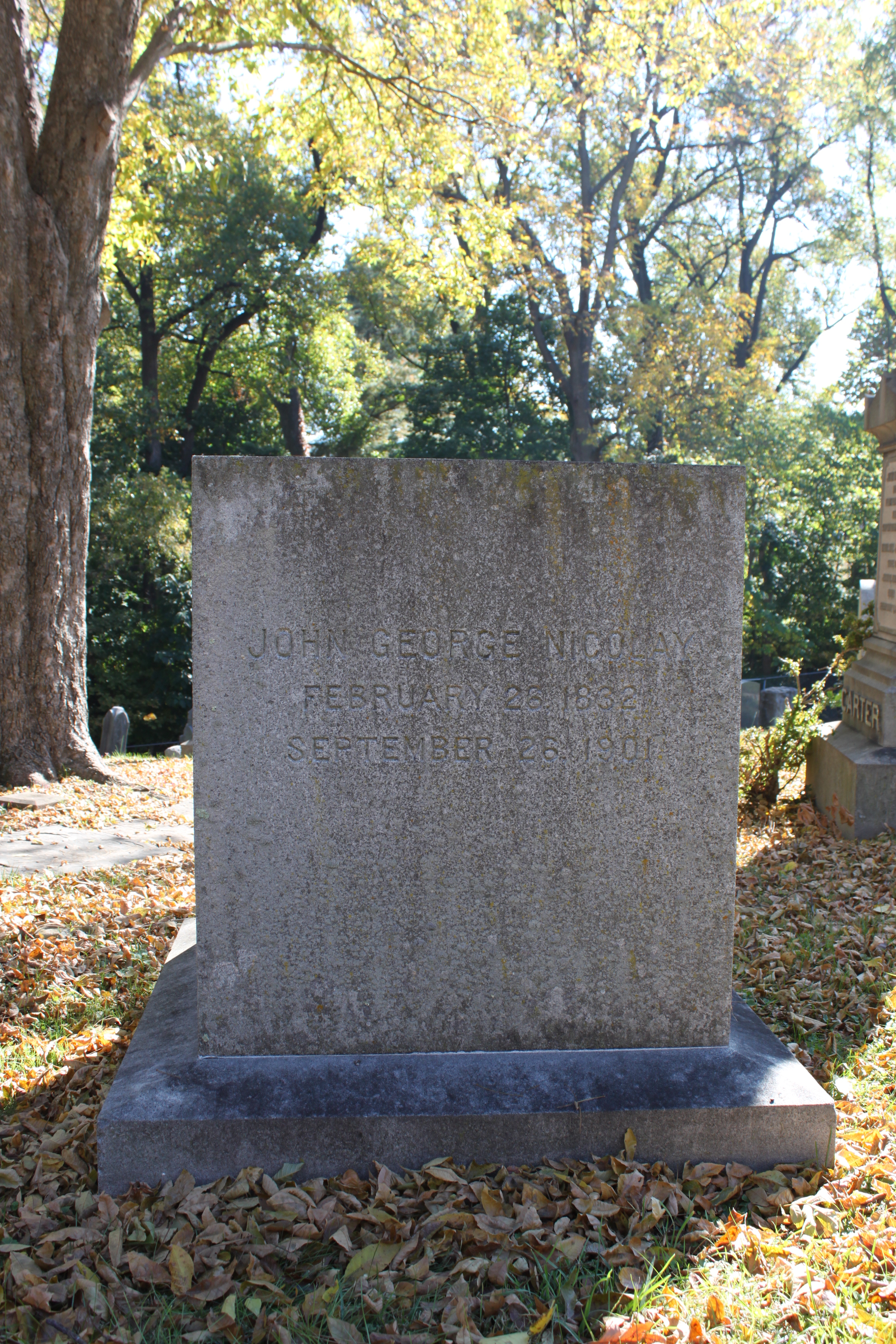
Nicolay's grave in Oak Hill Cemetery

Poor health had forced Nicolay to resign as Marshal of the Supreme Court, and he suffered from a wide range of ailments in his final years. He lived with his daughter Helen Nicolay at her home at 212 B Street SE in Washington, D.C. He died at home of unspecified causes on September 26, 1901. He was buried at Oak Hill Cemetery in the city.

== In popular culture ==
In the TV series Carl Sandburg's Lincoln, aired on NBC in 1974–1976, he was portrayed by Michael Cristofer. In the 1992 documentary Lincoln, the German-born Nicolay is voiced by the Austrian-born actor Arnold Schwarzenegger. In the 1988 NBC mini-series Lincoln, based on Gore Vidal's Lincoln: A Novel, Nicolay is portrayed by actor Richard Travis. In Steven Spielberg's 2012 film Lincoln, Nicolay is portrayed by Jeremy Strong. In the 2017 documentary film The Gettysburg Address, Nicolay is portrayed by actor William Fichtner.

== Works ==
- Nicolay, John George; Hay, John (1914). Abraham Lincoln: A History, Volume I. New York : The Century Co.
- —— (1914). Abraham Lincoln: A History, Volume II. New York : The Century Co.
- —— (1914). Abraham Lincoln: A History, Volume III. New York : The Century Co.
- —— (1914). Abraham Lincoln: A History, Volume IV. New York : The Century Co.
- —— (1914). Abraham Lincoln: A History, Volume V. New York : The Century Co.
- —— (1914). Abraham Lincoln: A History, Volume VI. New York : The Century Co.
- —— (1914). Abraham Lincoln: A History, Volume VII. New York : The Century Co.
- —— (1914). Abraham Lincoln: A History, Volume VIII. New York : The Century Co.
- —— (1914). Abraham Lincoln: A History, Volume IX. New York : The Century Co.
- —— (1914). Abraham Lincoln: A History, Volume X. New York : The Century Co.
- Campaigns of the Civil War, Volume 1: The Outbreak of Rebellion (originally published in 1881)
