= John Hay =

American statesman (1838–1905)

- Portrait, c. 1897

37th United States Secretary of State
- In office September 30, 1898 – July 1, 1905
- President: William McKinley; Theodore Roosevelt
- Preceded by: William R. Day
- Succeeded by: Elihu Root

United States Ambassador to the United Kingdom
- In office May 3, 1897 – September 12, 1898
- President: William McKinley
- Preceded by: Thomas F. Bayard
- Succeeded by: Joseph Hodges Choate

12th United States Assistant Secretary of State
- In office November 1, 1879 – May 3, 1881
- President: Rutherford B. Hayes; James A. Garfield
- Preceded by: Frederick W. Seward
- Succeeded by: Robert R. Hitt

Private Secretary to the President
- In office March 4, 1861 – April 15, 1865 Serving with John George Nicolay
- President: Abraham Lincoln
- Preceded by: James Buchanan III
- Succeeded by: William A. Browning

Personal details
- Born: John Milton Hay; October 8, 1838 Salem, Indiana, U.S.
- Died: July 1, 1905 (aged 66) Newbury, New Hampshire, U.S.
- Resting place: Lake View Cemetery, Cleveland, Ohio, U.S.
- Party: Republican
- Spouse: Clara Stone (m. 1874)
- Children: 4, including Helen and Adelbert
- Education: Brown University (AB, MA)

Military service
- Branch/service: United States Army (Union Army)
- Years of service: 1864–1865
- Rank: Major
- Battles/wars: American Civil War

John Milton Hay (October 8, 1838 – July 1, 1905) was an American statesman and official whose career in government lasted almost half a century. Beginning as a private secretary for Abraham Lincoln, he became a diplomat. He served as United States Secretary of State under Presidents William McKinley and Theodore Roosevelt. Hay was also a biographer of Lincoln, and wrote poetry and other literature.

Born in Salem, Indiana, to an anti-slavery family that moved to Warsaw, Illinois, Hay showed great potential from an early age, and his family sent him to Brown University. After graduation in 1858, Hay read law in his uncle's office in Springfield, Illinois, adjacent to that of Lincoln. Hay worked for Lincoln's successful presidential campaign and became one of his private secretaries in the White House. Throughout the American Civil War, Hay was close to Lincoln and stood by his deathbed after the President was shot. In addition to his other literary works, Hay co-authored, with John George Nicolay, Lincoln's other private secretary, a ten-volume biography of Lincoln that helped shape the assassinated president's historical image.

After Lincoln's death, Hay spent several years at diplomatic posts in Europe, then worked for the New-York Tribune under Horace Greeley and Whitelaw Reid. Hay remained active in politics, and from 1879 to 1881 served as Assistant Secretary of State. Afterward, he returned to the private sector, remaining there until President McKinley, of whom he had been a major backer, made him the Ambassador to the United Kingdom in 1897. Hay became the Secretary of State the following year.

Hay served for nearly seven years as Secretary of State under President McKinley and, after McKinley's assassination, under Theodore Roosevelt. Hay was responsible for negotiating the Open Door Policy, which kept China open to trade with all countries on an equal basis, with international powers. By negotiating the Hay–Pauncefote Treaty with the United Kingdom, the (ultimately unratified) Hay–Herrán Treaty with Colombia, and finally the Hay–Bunau-Varilla Treaty with the newly independent Republic of Panama, Hay also cleared the way for the building of the Panama Canal.

== Early life ==
=== Family and youth ===
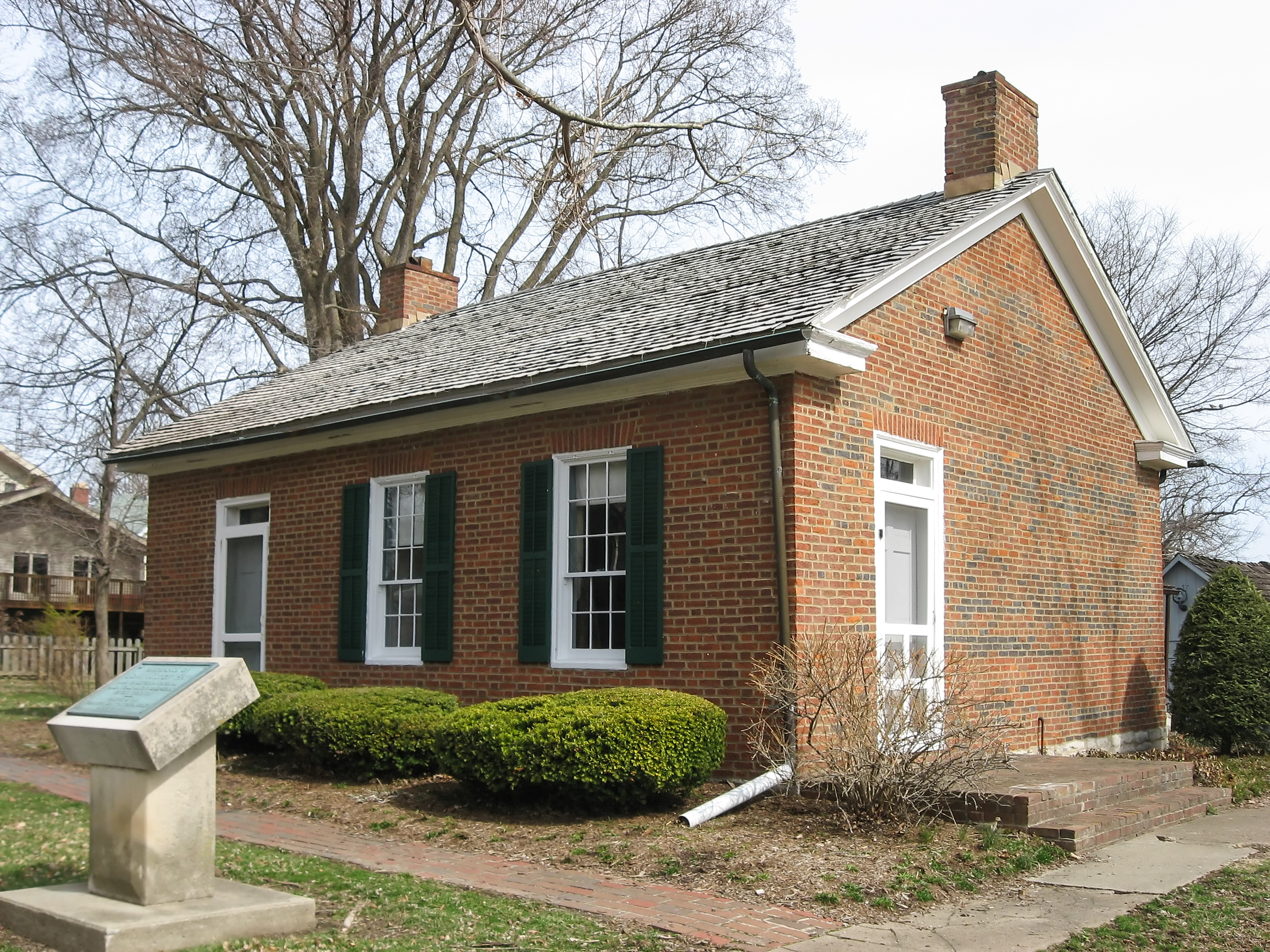
The Hay-Morrison House, birthplace of John Hay, Salem, Indiana

John Milton Hay was born in Salem, Indiana, on October 8, 1838. He was the third son of Dr. Charles Hay and the former Helen Leonard. Charles Hay, born in Lexington, Kentucky, hated slavery and moved to the North in the early 1830s. A doctor, he practiced in Salem. Helen's father, David Leonard, had moved his family west from Assonet, Massachusetts, in 1818, but died en route to Vincennes, Indiana, and Helen relocated to Salem in 1830 to teach school. They married there in 1831. Charles was not successful in Salem, and moved, with his wife and children, to Warsaw, Illinois, in 1841.

John attended the local schools, and in 1849 his uncle Milton Hay invited John to live at his home in Pittsfield, Pike County, and attend a well-regarded local school, the John D. Thomson Academy. Milton was a friend of Springfield attorney Abraham Lincoln and had read law in the firm Stuart and Lincoln. In Pittsfield, John first met John Nicolay, who was at the time a 20-year-old newspaperman. Once John Hay completed his studies there, the 13-year-old was sent to live with his grandfather in Springfield and attend school there. His parents and uncle Milton (who financed the boy's education) sent him to Brown University in Providence, Rhode Island, alma mater of his late maternal grandfather.

=== Student and Lincoln supporter ===
Hay c. 1858

Hay enrolled at Brown in 1855. Although he enjoyed college life, he did not find it easy: his Western clothing and accent made him stand out; he was not well prepared academically and was often sick. Hay gained a reputation as a star student and became a part of Providence's literary circle that included Sarah Helen Whitman and Nora Perry. He wrote poetry and experimented with hashish. Hay received his Master of Arts degree in 1858, and was, like his grandfather before him, Class Poet. He returned to Illinois. Milton Hay had moved his practice to Springfield, and John became a clerk in his firm, where he could study law.

Milton Hay's firm was one of the most prestigious in Illinois. Lincoln maintained offices next door and was a rising star in the new Republican Party. Hay recalled an early encounter with Lincoln:

He came into the law office where I was reading ... with a copy of Harper's Magazine in hand, containing Senator Douglas's famous article on Popular Sovereignty. [whether residents of each territory could decide on slavery] Lincoln seemed greatly roused by what he had read. Entering the office without a salutation, he said: "This will never do. He puts the moral element out of this question. It won't stay out."

Hay was not a supporter of Lincoln for president until after his nomination in 1860. Hay then made speeches and wrote newspaper articles boosting Lincoln's candidacy. When Nicolay, who had been made Lincoln's private secretary for the campaign, found he needed help with the huge amounts of correspondence, Hay worked full-time for Lincoln for six months.

After Lincoln was elected, Nicolay, who continued as Lincoln's private secretary, recommended that Hay be hired to assist him at the White House. Lincoln is reported to have said, "We can't take all Illinois with us down to Washington" but then "Well, let Hay come". Kushner and Sherrill were dubious about "the story of Lincoln's offhand appointment of Hay" as fitting well into Hay's self-image of never having been an office-seeker, but "poorly into the realities of Springfield politics of the 1860s"—Hay must have expected some reward for handling Lincoln's correspondence for months. Hay biographer John Taliaferro suggests that Lincoln engaged Nicolay and Hay to assist him, rather than more seasoned men, both "out of loyalty and surely because of the competence and compatibility that his two young aides had demonstrated". Historian Joshua Zeitz argues that Lincoln was moved to hire Hay when Milton agreed to pay his nephew's salary for six months.

== American Civil War ==
=== Secretary to Lincoln ===
Hay in 1862

Milton Hay desired that his nephew go to Washington as a qualified attorney, and John Hay was admitted to the bar in Illinois on February 4, 1861. On February 11, he embarked with President-elect Lincoln on a circuitous journey to Washington. By this time, several Southern states had seceded to form the Confederate States of America in reaction to the election of Lincoln, seen as an opponent of slavery. When Lincoln was sworn in on March 4, Hay and Nicolay moved into the White House, sharing a shabby bedroom. (Note: Hay's office is today known as the Queens' Sitting Room; the bedroom he shared with Nicolay is known as the Queens' Bedroom. See Zeitz 2014a, p. 87.) As there was only authority for payment of one presidential secretary (Nicolay), Hay was appointed to a post in the Interior Department at $1,600 per year, (Note: According to Zeitz, $1,500. See Zeitz 2014a, p. 71.) seconded to service at the White House. They were available to Lincoln 24 hours a day. As Lincoln took no vacations as president and worked seven days a week, often until 11 pm (or later, during crucial battles) the burden on his secretaries was heavy.

Hay and Nicolay divided their responsibilities, Nicolay tending to assist Lincoln in his office and in meetings, while Hay dealt with the correspondence, which was voluminous. Both men tried to shield Lincoln from office-seekers and others who wanted to meet with the President. Unlike the dour Nicolay, Hay, with his charm, escaped much of the hard feelings from those denied Lincoln's presence. Abolitionist Thomas Wentworth Higginson described Hay as "a nice young fellow, who unfortunately looks about seventeen and is oppressed with the necessity of behaving like seventy." Hay continued to write, anonymously, for newspapers, sending in columns calculated to make Lincoln appear a sorrowful man, religious and competent, giving of his life and health to preserve the Union. Similarly, Hay served as what Taliaferro deemed a "White House propagandist," in his columns explaining away losses such as that at First Bull Run in July 1861.

Group portrait of Lincoln and his secretaries, Hay (right) and John George Nicolay, by Alexander Gardner, November 8, 1863

Despite the heavy workload—Hay wrote that he was busy 20 hours a day—he tried to make as normal a life as possible, eating his meals with Nicolay at Willard's Hotel, going to the theater with Abraham and Mary Todd Lincoln, and reading Les Misérables in French. Hay, still in his early 20s, spent time both in barrooms and at cultured get-togethers in the homes of Washington's elite. The two secretaries often clashed with Mary Lincoln, who resorted to various stratagems to get the dilapidated White House restored without depleting Lincoln's salary, which had to cover entertainment and other expenses. Despite the secretaries' objections, Mrs. Lincoln was generally the victor and managed to save almost 70 percent of her husband's salary in his four years in office.

After the death of Lincoln's 11-year-old son Willie in February 1862 (an event not mentioned in Hay's diary or correspondence), "it was Hay who became, if not a surrogate son, then a young man who stirred a higher form of parental nurturing that Lincoln, despite his best intentions, did not successfully bestow on either of his surviving children". According to Hay biographer Robert Gale, "Hay came to adore Lincoln for his goodness, patience, understanding, sense of humor, humility, magnanimity, sense of justice, healthy skepticism, resilience and power, love of the common man, and mystical patriotism". Speaker of the House Galusha Grow stated, "Lincoln was very much attached to him"; writer Charles G. Halpine, who knew Hay then, later recorded that "Lincoln loved him as a son".

Hay and Nicolay accompanied Lincoln to Gettysburg, Pennsylvania, for the dedication of the cemetery there, where were interred many of those who fell at the Battle of Gettysburg. Although they made much of Lincoln's brief Gettysburg Address in their 1890 multi-volume biography of Lincoln, Hay's diary states "the President, in a firm, free way, with more grace than is his wont, said his half-dozen lines of consecration."

=== Presidential emissary ===
Major Hay (left) and lieutenant colonel Edward W. Smith in Hilton Head, South Carolina, January 22, 1864

Lincoln sent Hay away from the White House on various missions. In August 1861, Hay escorted Mary Lincoln and her children to Long Branch, New Jersey, a resort on the Jersey Shore, both as their caretaker and as a means of giving Hay a much-needed break. The following month, Lincoln sent him to Missouri to deliver a letter to Union General John C. Frémont, who had irritated the President with military blunders and by freeing local slaves without authorization, endangering Lincoln's attempts to keep the border states in the Union.

In April 1863, Lincoln sent Hay to the Union-occupied South Carolina coast to report back on the ironclad vessels being used in an attempt to recapture Charleston Harbor. Hay then went on to the Florida coast. He returned to Florida in January 1864, after Lincoln had announced his Ten Percent Plan, that if ten percent of the 1860 electorate in a state took oaths of loyalty and to support emancipation, they could form a government with federal protection. Lincoln considered Florida, with its small population, a good test case, and made Hay a major, (Note: Hay was brevetted lieutenant colonel and colonel in May 1865. See Gale, p. 18.) sending him to see if he could get sufficient men to take the oath. Hay spent a month in the state during February and March 1864, but Union defeats there reduced the area under federal control. Believing his mission impractical, he sailed back to Washington.

In July 1864, New York publisher Horace Greeley sent word to Lincoln that there were Southern peace emissaries in Canada. Lincoln doubted that they actually spoke for Confederate President Jefferson Davis, but had Hay journey to New York to persuade the publisher to go to Niagara Falls, Ontario, to meet with them and bring them to Washington. Greeley reported to Lincoln that the emissaries lacked accreditation by Davis, but were confident they could bring both sides together. Lincoln sent Hay to Ontario with what became known as the Niagara Manifesto: that if the South laid down its arms, freed the slaves, and reentered the Union, it could expect liberal terms on other points. The Southerners refused to come to Washington to negotiate.

=== Assassination of Lincoln ===
By the end of 1864, with Lincoln re-elected and the victorious war winding down, both Hay and Nicolay let it be known that they desired different jobs. Soon after Lincoln's second inauguration in March 1865, the two secretaries were appointed to the U.S. delegation in Paris, Nicolay as consul and Hay as secretary of legation. Hay wrote to his brother Charles that the appointment was "entirely unsolicited and unexpected", a statement that Kushner and Sherrill found unconvincing given that Hay had spent hundreds of hours during the war with Secretary of State William H. Seward, who had often discussed personal and political matters with him, and the close relationship between the two men was so well known that office-seekers cultivated Hay as a means of getting to Seward. The two men were also motivated to find new jobs by their deteriorating relationship with Mary Lincoln, who sought their ouster, and by Nicolay's desire to wed his intended—he could not bring a bride to his shared room at the White House. They remained at the White House pending the arrival and training of replacements.

Hay did not accompany the Lincolns to Ford's Theatre on the night of April 14, 1865, but remained at the White House, drinking whiskey with Robert Lincoln. When the two were informed that the President had been shot, they hastened to the Petersen House, a boarding house where the stricken Lincoln had been taken. Hay remained by Lincoln's deathbed through the night and was present when he died. At the moment of Lincoln's death, Hay observed "a look of unspeakable peace came upon his worn features". He heard War Secretary Edwin Stanton's declaration, "Now he belongs to the ages."

According to Kushner and Sherrill, "Lincoln's death was for Hay a personal loss, like the loss of a father ... Lincoln's assassination erased any remaining doubts Hay had about Lincoln's greatness." In 1866, in a personal letter, Hay deemed Lincoln, "the greatest character since Christ". Taliaferro noted that "Hay would spend the rest of his life mourning Lincoln ... wherever Hay went and whatever he did, Lincoln would always be watching".

== Early diplomatic career ==
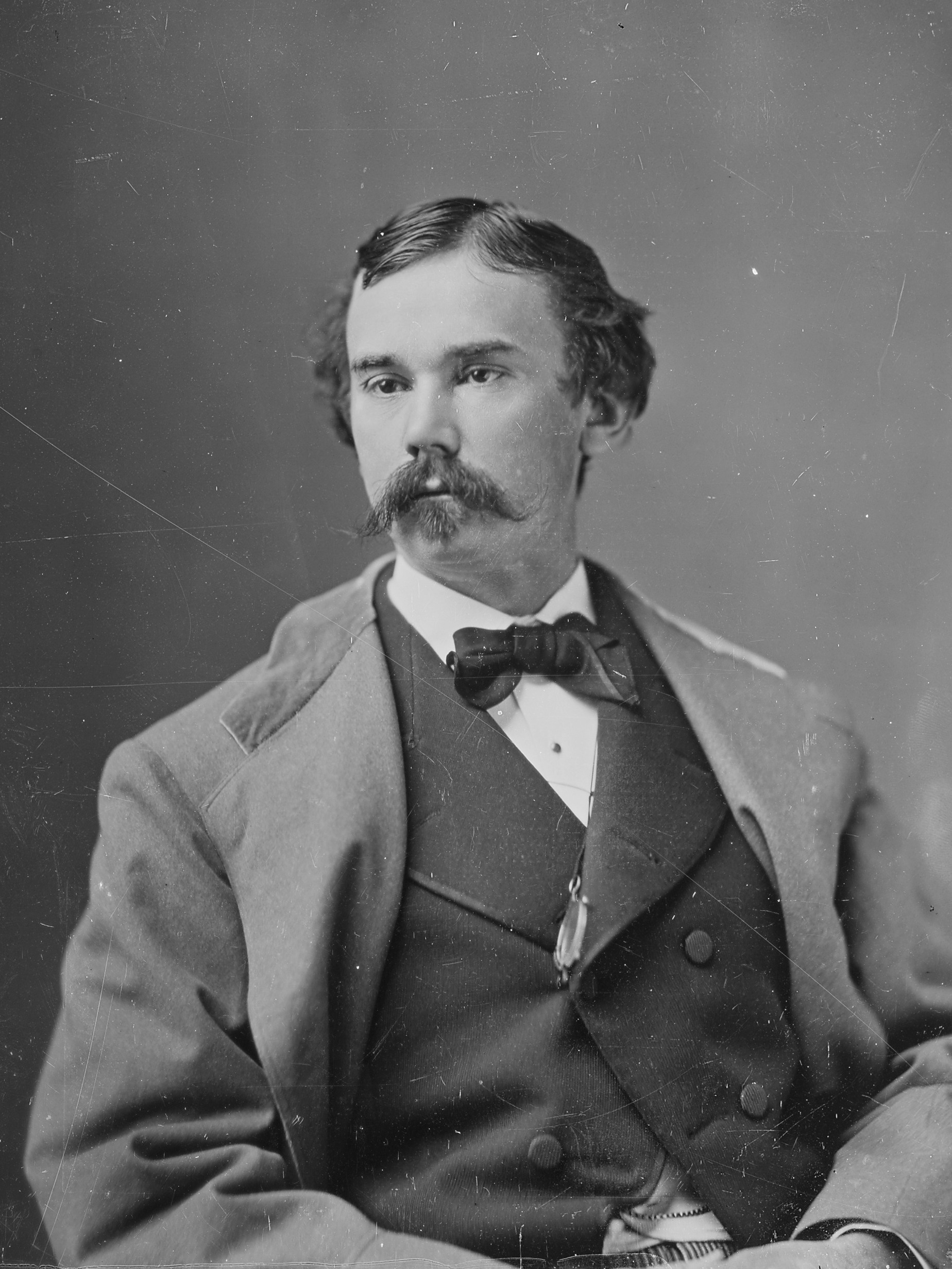
Portrait by Mathew Brady c. 1865

Hay sailed for Paris at the end of June 1865. There, he served under U.S. Minister to France John Bigelow. The workload was not heavy, and Hay found time to enjoy the pleasures of Paris. When Bigelow resigned in mid-1866, Hay, as was customary, submitted his resignation, though he was asked to remain until Bigelow's successor was in place, and stayed until January 1867. He consulted with Secretary of State Seward, asking him for "anything worth having". Seward suggested the post of Minister to Sweden, but reckoned without the new president, Andrew Johnson, who had his own candidate. Seward offered Hay a job as his private secretary, but Hay declined, and returned home to Warsaw, Illinois.

Initially happy to be home, Hay quickly grew restive, and he was glad to hear, in early June 1867, that he had been appointed secretary of legation to act as chargé d'affaires at Vienna. He sailed for Europe the same month, and while in England visited the House of Commons, where he was greatly impressed by the Chancellor of the Exchequer, Benjamin Disraeli. The Vienna post was only temporary, until Johnson could appoint a chargé d'affaires and have him confirmed by the Senate, and the workload was light, allowing Hay, who was fluent in German, to spend much of his time traveling. It was not until July 1868 that Henry Watts became Hay's replacement. Hay resigned, spent the remainder of the summer in Europe, then went home to Warsaw.

Unemployed again, in December 1868 Hay journeyed to the capital, writing to Nicolay that he "came to Washington in the peaceful pursuit of a fat office. But there is nothing just now available". Seward promised to "wrestle with Andy for anything that turns up", but nothing did prior to the departure of both Seward and Johnson from office on March 4, 1869. In May, Hay went back to Washington from Warsaw to press his case with the new Grant administration. The next month, due to the influence of his friends, he obtained the post of secretary of legation in Spain.

Although the salary was low, Hay was interested in serving in Madrid both because of the political situation there—Queen Isabella II had recently been deposed—and because the U.S. Minister was the swashbuckling former congressman, General Daniel Sickles. Hay hoped to assist Sickles in gaining U.S. control over Cuba, then a Spanish colony. Sickles was unsuccessful and Hay resigned in May 1870, citing the low salary, but remaining in his post until September. Two legacies of Hay's time in Madrid were magazine articles he wrote that became the basis of his first book, Castilian Days, and his lifelong friendship with Sickles's personal secretary, Alvey A. Adee, who would be a close aide to Hay at the State Department.

== Wilderness years (1870–1897) ==
=== Tribune and marriage ===
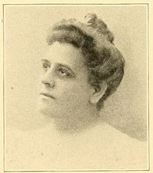
Clara Louise Stone

While still in Spain, Hay had been offered the position of assistant editor at the New-York Tribune—both the editor, Horace Greeley, and his managing editor, Whitelaw Reid, were anxious to hire Hay. He joined the staff in October 1870. The Tribune was the leading reform newspaper in New York, and through mail subscriptions, the largest-circulating newspaper in the nation. Hay wrote editorials for the Tribune, and Greeley soon proclaimed him the most brilliant writer of "breviers" (as such editorials were called) that he had ever had.

With his success as an editorial writer, Hay's duties expanded. In October 1871, he journeyed to Chicago after the great fire there, interviewing Mrs. O'Leary, whose cow was said to have started the blaze, describing her as "a woman with a lamp [who went] to the barn behind the house, to milk the cow with the crumpled temper, that kicked the lamp, that spilled the kerosene, that fired the straw that burned Chicago". His work at the Tribune came as his fame as a poet was reaching its peak, and one colleague described it as "a liberal education in the delights of intellectual life to sit in intimate companionship with John Hay and watch the play of that well-stored and brilliant mind". In addition to writing, Hay was signed by the prestigious Boston Lyceum Bureau, whose clients included Mark Twain and Susan B. Anthony, to give lectures on the prospects for democracy in Europe, and on his years in the Lincoln White House.

By the time President Grant ran for re-election in 1872, Grant's administration had been rocked by scandal, and some disaffected members of his party formed the Liberal Republicans, naming Greeley as their candidate for president, a nomination soon joined in by the Democrats. Hay was unenthusiastic about the editor-turned-candidate, and in his editorials mostly took aim at Grant, who, despite the scandals, remained untarred, and who won a landslide victory in the election. Greeley died only weeks later, a broken man. Hay's stance endangered his hitherto sterling credentials in the Republican Party.

By 1873, Hay was wooing Clara Stone, daughter of Cleveland multimillionaire railroad and banking mogul Amasa Stone. Their marriage in 1874 made the salary attached to office a small consideration for the rest of his life. Amasa Stone needed someone to watch over his investments, and wanted Hay to move to Cleveland to fill the post. Although the Hays initially lived in John's New York apartment and later in a townhouse there, they moved in June 1875 to Stone's ornate home on Cleveland's Euclid Avenue, "Millionaire's Row", and a mansion was quickly under construction for the Hays next-door. The Hays had four children, Helen Hay Whitney, Adelbert Stone Hay, Alice Evelyn Hay Wadsworth Boyd (who married James Wolcott Wadsworth Jr.), and Clarence Leonard Hay. Their father proved successful as a money manager, though he devoted much of his time to literary and political activities, writing to Adee that "I do nothing but read and yawn".

On December 29, 1876, a bridge over Ohio's Ashtabula River collapsed. The bridge had been built from metal cast at one of Stone's mills, and was carrying a train owned and operated by Stone's Lake Shore and Michigan Railway. Ninety-two people died; it was the worst rail disaster in American history up to that point. Blame fell heavily on Stone, who departed for Europe to recuperate and left Hay in charge of his businesses. The summer of 1877 was marked by labor disputes; a strike over wage cuts on the Baltimore and Ohio Railroad soon spread to the Lake Shore, much to Hay's outrage. He blamed foreign agitators for the dispute, and vented his anger over the strike in his only novel, The Bread-Winners (1883).

=== Return to politics ===
Hay in Frank Leslie's Illustrated Newspaper, December 20, 1879

Hay remained disaffected from the Republican Party in the mid-1870s. Seeking a candidate of either party he could support as a reformer, he watched as his favored Democrat, Samuel Tilden, gained his party's nomination, but his favored Republican, James G. Blaine, did not, falling to Ohio Governor Rutherford B. Hayes, whom Hay did not support during the campaign. Hayes's victory in the election left Hay an outsider as he sought a return to politics, and he was initially offered no place in the new administration. Nevertheless, Hay attempted to ingratiate himself with the new president by sending him a gold ring with a strand of George Washington's hair, a gesture that Hayes deeply appreciated. Hay spent time working with Nicolay on their Lincoln biography, and traveling in Europe. When Reid, who had succeeded Greeley as editor of the Tribune, was offered the post of Minister to Germany in December 1878, he turned it down and recommended Hay. Secretary of State William M. Evarts indicated that Hay "had not been active enough in political efforts", to Hay's regret, who told Reid that he "would like a second-class mission uncommonly well".

From May to October 1879, Hay set out to reconfirm his credentials as a loyal Republican, giving speeches in support of candidates and attacking the Democrats. In October, President and Mrs. Hayes came to a reception at Hay's Cleveland home. When Assistant Secretary of State Frederick W. Seward resigned later that month, Hay was offered his place and accepted, after some hesitancy because he was considering running for Congress.

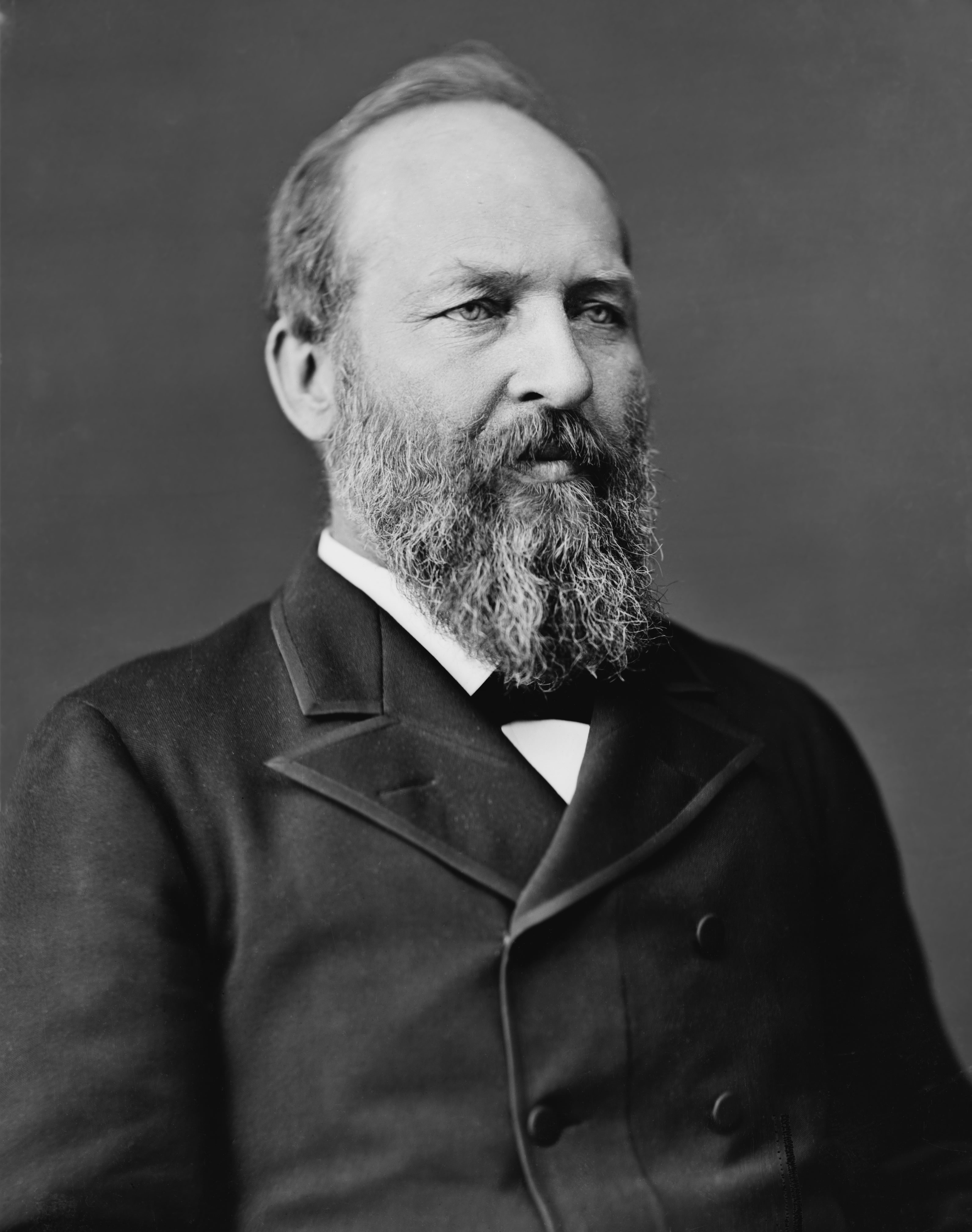
James A. Garfield: the second president to be assassinated whom Hay advised

In Washington, Hay oversaw a staff of eighty employees, renewed his acquaintance with his friend Henry Adams, and substituted for Evarts at Cabinet meetings when the Secretary was out of town. In 1880, he campaigned for the Republican nominee for president, Ohio Congressman James A. Garfield. Hay felt that Garfield did not have enough backbone, and hoped that Reid and others would "inoculate him with the gall which I fear he lacks". Garfield consulted Hay before and after his election as president on appointments and other matters, but offered Hay only the post of private secretary (though he promised to increase its pay and power), and Hay declined. Hay resigned as assistant secretary effective March 31, 1881, and spent the next seven months as acting editor of the Tribune during Reid's extended absence in Europe. Garfield's death in September and Reid's return the following month left Hay again on the outside of political power, looking in. He would spend the next fifteen years in that position.

=== Wealthy traveler (1881–1897) ===
==== Author and dilettante ====
Portrait by Marian Hooper Adams, 1883

After 1881, Hay did not again hold public office until 1897. Amasa Stone committed suicide in 1883; his death left the Hays very wealthy. They spent several months in most years traveling in Europe. The Lincoln biography absorbed some of Hay's time, the hardest work being done with Nicolay in 1884 and 1885; beginning in 1886, portions began appearing serially, and the ten-volume biography was published in 1890.

In 1884, Hay and Adams commissioned architect Henry Hobson Richardson to construct houses for them on Washington's Lafayette Square; these were completed by 1886. Hay's house, facing the White House and fronting on Sixteenth Street, was described even before completion as "the finest house in Washington." The price for the combined tract, purchased from William Wilson Corcoran, was $73,800, of which Adams paid a third for his lot. Hay budgeted the construction cost at $50,000; his ornate, 12,000 square feet (1,100 m^{2}) mansion eventually cost over twice that. Despite their possession of two lavish houses, the Hays spent less than half the year in Washington and only a few weeks a year in Cleveland. They also spent time at The Fells, their summer residence in Newbury, New Hampshire. According to Gale, "for a full decade before his appointment in 1897 as ambassador to England, Hay was lazy and uncertain."

Hay continued to devote much of his energy to Republican politics. In 1884, he supported Blaine for president, donating considerable sums to the senator's unsuccessful campaign against New York Governor Grover Cleveland. Many of Hay's friends were unenthusiastic about Blaine's candidacy, to Hay's anger, and he wrote to editor Richard Watson Gilder, "I have never been able to appreciate the logic that induces some excellent people every four years because they cannot nominate the candidate they prefer to vote for the party they don't prefer." In 1888, Hay had to follow his own advice as his favored candidate, Ohio Senator John Sherman, was unsuccessful at the Republican convention. After some reluctance, Hay supported the nominee, former Indiana senator Benjamin Harrison, who was elected. Though Harrison appointed men whom Hay supported, including Blaine, Reid, and Robert Lincoln, Hay was not asked to serve in the Harrison administration. In 1890, Hay spoke for Republican congressional candidates, addressing a rally of 10,000 people in New York City, but the party was defeated, losing control of Congress. Hay contributed funds to Harrison's unsuccessful re-election effort, in part because Reid had been made Harrison's 1892 running mate.

==== McKinley backer ====
Hay was an early supporter of Ohio's William McKinley and worked closely with McKinley's political manager, Cleveland industrialist Mark Hanna. In 1889, Hay supported McKinley in his unsuccessful effort to become Speaker of the House. Four years later, McKinley—by then Governor of Ohio—faced a crisis when a friend whose notes he had imprudently co-signed went bankrupt during the Panic of 1893. The debts were beyond the governor's means to pay, and the possibility of insolvency threatened McKinley's promising political career. Hay was among those Hanna called upon to contribute, buying up $3,000 of the debt of over $100,000. Although others paid more, "Hay's checks were two of the first, and his touch was more personal, a kindness McKinley never forgot". The governor wrote, "How can I ever repay you & other dear friends?"

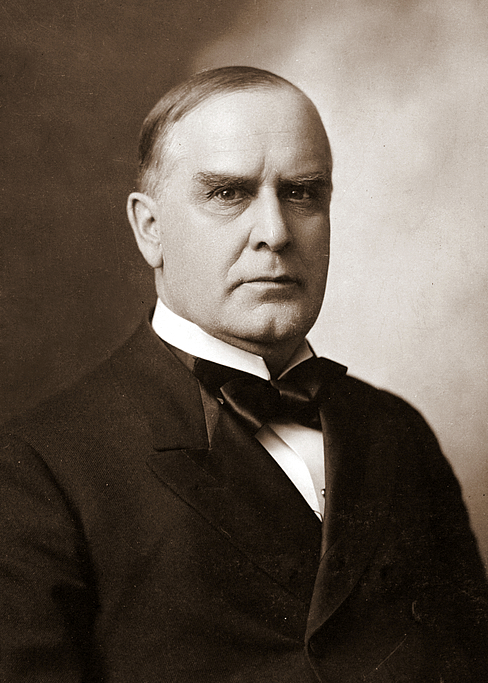
Hay supported William McKinley in the 1896 presidential election.

The same panic that nearly ruined McKinley convinced Hay that men like himself must take office to save the country from disaster. By the end of 1894, he was deeply involved in efforts to lay the groundwork for the governor's 1896 presidential bid. It was Hay's job to persuade potential supporters that McKinley was worth backing. Nevertheless, Hay found time for a lengthy stay in New Hampshire—one visitor at The Fells in mid-1895 was Rudyard Kipling—and later in the year wrote, "The summer wanes and I have done nothing for McKinley." He atoned with a $500 check to Hanna, the first of many. During the winter of 1895–96, Hay passed along what he heard from other Republicans influential in Washington, such as Massachusetts Senator Henry Cabot Lodge.

Hay spent part of the spring and early summer of 1896 in the United Kingdom, and elsewhere in Europe. There was a border dispute between Venezuela and British Guiana, and Cleveland's Secretary of State, Richard Olney, supported the Venezuelan position, announcing the Olney interpretation of the Monroe Doctrine. Hay told British politicians that McKinley, if elected, would be unlikely to change course. McKinley was nominated in June 1896; still, many Britons were minded to support whoever became the Democratic candidate. This changed when the 1896 Democratic National Convention nominated former Nebraska congressman William Jennings Bryan on a "free silver" platform; he had electrified the delegates with his Cross of Gold speech. Hay reported to McKinley when he returned to Britain after a brief stay on the Continent during which Bryan was nominated in Chicago: "they were all scared out of their wits for fear Bryan would be elected, and very polite in their references to you."

Once Hay returned to the United States in early August, he went to The Fells and watched from afar as Bryan barnstormed the nation in his campaign while McKinley gave speeches from his front porch. Despite an invitation from the candidate, Hay was reluctant to visit McKinley at his home in Canton. "He has asked me to come, but I thought I would not struggle with the millions on his trampled lawn". In October, after basing himself at his Cleveland home and giving a speech for McKinley, Hay went to Canton at last, writing to Adams,

I had been dreading it for a month, thinking it would be like talking in a boiler factory. But he met me at the [railroad] station, gave me meat & took me upstairs and talked for two hours as calmly & serenely as if we were summer boarders in Bethlehem, at a loss for means to kill time. I was more struck than ever with his mask. It is a genuine Italian ecclesiastical face of the XVth Century.

Hay was disgusted by Bryan's speeches, writing in language that Taliaferro compares to The Bread-Winners that the Democrat "simply reiterates the unquestioned truths that every man with a clean shirt is a thief and ought to be hanged: that there is no goodness and wisdom except among the illiterate & criminal classes". Despite Bryan's strenuous efforts, McKinley won the election easily, with a campaign run by himself and Hanna, and well-financed by supporters like Hay. Henry Adams later wondered, "I would give sixpence to know how much Hay paid for McKinley. His politics must have cost."

== Ambassador ==
=== Appointment ===
In the post-election speculation as to who would be given office under McKinley, Hay's name figured prominently, as did that of Whitelaw Reid; both men sought high office in the State Department, either as secretary or one of the major ambassadorial posts. Reid, in addition to his vice-presidential run, had been Minister to France under Harrison. An asthmatic, he handicapped himself by departing for Arizona Territory for the winter, leading to speculation about his health.

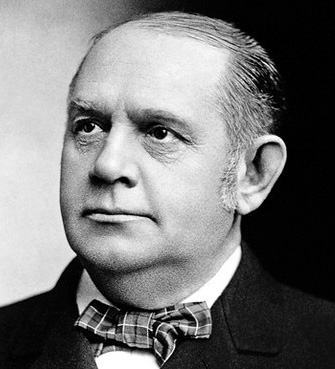
Mark Hanna

Hay was faster than Reid to realize that the race for these posts would be affected by Hanna's desire to be senator from Ohio, as with one of the state's places about to be occupied by the newly elected Joseph B. Foraker, the only possible seat for him was that held by Senator Sherman. As the septuagenarian senator had served as Treasury Secretary under Hayes, only the secretaryship of state was likely to attract him and cause a vacancy that Hanna could fill. Hay knew that with only eight cabinet positions, only one could go to an Ohioan, and so he had no chance for a cabinet post. Accordingly, Hay encouraged Reid to seek the State position, while firmly ruling himself out as a possible candidate for that post, and quietly seeking the inside track to be ambassador in London. Zeitz states that Hay "aggressively lobbied" for the position.

According to Taliaferro, "only after the deed was accomplished and Hay was installed as the ambassador to the Court of St. James's would it be possible to detect just how subtly and completely he had finessed his ally and friend, Whitelaw Reid". A telegraph from Hay to McKinley in the latter's papers, dated December 26 (most likely 1896) reveals the former's suggestion that McKinley tell Reid that the editor's friends had insisted that Reid not endanger his health through office, especially in London's smoggy climes. The following month, in a letter, Hay set forth his own case for the ambassadorship, and urged McKinley to act quickly, as suitable accommodations in London would be difficult to secure. Hay gained his object (as did Hanna), and shifted his focus to appeasing Reid. Taliaferro states that Reid never blamed Hay, but Kushner and Sherrill recorded, "Reid was certain that he had been wronged" by Hay, and the announcement of Hay's appointment nearly ended their 26-year friendship.

Reaction in Britain to Hay's appointment was generally positive, with George Smalley of The Times writing to him, "we want a man who is a true American yet not anti-English". Hay secured a Georgian house on Carlton House Terrace, overlooking Horse Guards Parade, with 11 servants. He brought with him Clara, their own silver, two carriages, and five horses. Hay's salary of $17,000 "did not even begin to cover the cost of their extravagant lifestyle".

=== Service ===
Caricature of Hay by Leslie Ward in Vanity Fair, 1897

During his service as ambassador, Hay attempted to advance the relationship between the U.S. and Britain. The United Kingdom had long been seen negatively by many Americans, a legacy of its role during the American Revolution that was refreshed by its neutrality in the American Civil War, when it allowed merchant raiders such as the Alabama to be constructed in British ports, which then preyed on US-flagged ships. In spite of these past differences, according to Taliaferro, "rapprochement made more sense than at any time in their respective histories". In his Thanksgiving Day address to the American Society in London in 1897, Hay echoed these points, "The great body of people in the United States and England are friends ... [sharing] that intense respect and reverence for order, liberty, and law which is so profound a sentiment in both countries". Although Hay was not successful in resolving specific controversies in his year and a third as ambassador, both he and British policymakers regarded his tenure as a success, because of the advancement of good feelings and cooperation between the two nations.

An ongoing dispute between the U.S. and Britain was over the practice of pelagic sealing, that is, the capture of seals offshore of Alaska. The U.S. considered them American resources; the Canadians (Britain was still responsible for that dominion's foreign policy) contended that the mammals were being taken on the high seas, free to all. Soon after Hay's arrival, McKinley sent former Secretary of State John W. Foster to London to negotiate the issue. Foster quickly issued an accusatory note to the British that was printed in the newspapers. Although Hay was successful in getting Lord Salisbury, then both Prime Minister and Foreign Secretary, to agree to a conference to decide the matter, the British withdrew when the U.S. also invited Russia and Japan, rendering the conference ineffective. Another issue on which no agreement was reached was that of bimetallism: McKinley had promised silver-leaning Republicans to seek an international agreement varying the price ratio between silver and gold to allow for free coinage of silver, and Hay was instructed to seek British participation. The British would only join if the Indian colonial government (on a silver standard until 1893) was willing; this did not occur, and coupled with an improving economic situation that decreased support for bimetallism in the United States, no agreement was reached.

Hay had little involvement in the crisis over Cuba that culminated in the Spanish–American War. He met with Lord Salisbury in October 1897 and gained assurances Britain would not intervene if the U.S. found it necessary to go to war against Spain. Hay's role was "to make friends and to pass along the English point of view to Washington". Hay spent much of early 1898 on an extended trip to the Middle East, and did not return to London until the last week of March, by which time the USS Maine had exploded in Havana harbor. During the war, he worked to ensure U.S.–British amity, and British acceptance of the U.S. occupation of the Philippines—Salisbury and his government preferred that the U.S. have the islands than have them fall into the hands of the Germans. Hay succeeded in making sure that the British were kept "in the loop" with regards to the U.S. invasion of Cuba, and in both reassuring the British that none of their interests in Cuba would be harmed by the invasion, while simultaneously communicating those interests to the McKinley administration (McKinley was himself keen on maintaining a good relationship with the British).

In its early days, Hay described the war "as necessary as it is righteous". In July, writing to former Assistant Secretary of the Navy Theodore Roosevelt, who had gained wartime glory by leading the Rough Riders volunteer regiment, Hay made a description of the war for which, according to Zeitz, he "is best remembered by many students of American history":

It has been a splendid little war, begun with the highest motives, carried on with magnificent intelligence and spirit, favored by that Fortune that loves the brave. It is now to be concluded, I hope, with that fine good nature, which is, after all, the distinguishing trait of the American character.

Secretary Sherman had resigned on the eve of war, and been replaced by his first assistant, William R. Day. One of McKinley's Canton cronies, with little experience of statecraft, Day was never intended as more than a temporary wartime replacement. With America about to splash her flag across the Pacific, McKinley needed a secretary with stronger credentials. On August 14, 1898, Hay received a telegram from McKinley that Day would head the American delegation to the peace talks with Spain, and that Hay would be the new Secretary of State. After some indecision, Hay, who did not think he could decline and still remain as ambassador, accepted. British response to Hay's promotion was generally positive, and Queen Victoria, after he took formal leave of her at Osborne House, invited him again the following day, and subsequently pronounced him, "the most interesting of all the Ambassadors I have known."

== Secretary of State ==
=== McKinley years ===
President William McKinley and his Cabinet, 1901 Far left: William McKinley. Left to right, back: Lyman J. Gage, John W. Griggs, John D. Long, James Wilson, and Ethan A. Hitchcock. Left to right, front: John Hay, Elihu Root, and Charles E. Smith.

John Hay was sworn in as Secretary of State on September 30, 1898. He needed little introduction to Cabinet meetings, and sat at the President's right hand. Meetings were held in the Cabinet Room of the White House, where he found his old office and bedroom each occupied by several clerks. Now responsible for 1,300 federal employees, he leaned heavily for administrative help on his old friend Alvey Adee, the second assistant.

Hay believed that America's most valuable foreign relationship "by far" was its relationship with Great Britain. As Secretary of State he did everything he could to cultivate a positive relationship with London. Eventually this proved successful, one example of this success being the Hay–Pauncefote Treaty. Hay formed a habit of confiding in the British, and sharing sensitive intelligence with them, while at the same time shutting out the governments of Spain, France, Germany and Russia. Senator Mark Hanna remarked that "Hay and McKinley are outrageously pro-British." The French ambassador remarked that "Hay is friendly to the British and unfriendly to us, we should regard him with much suspicion."

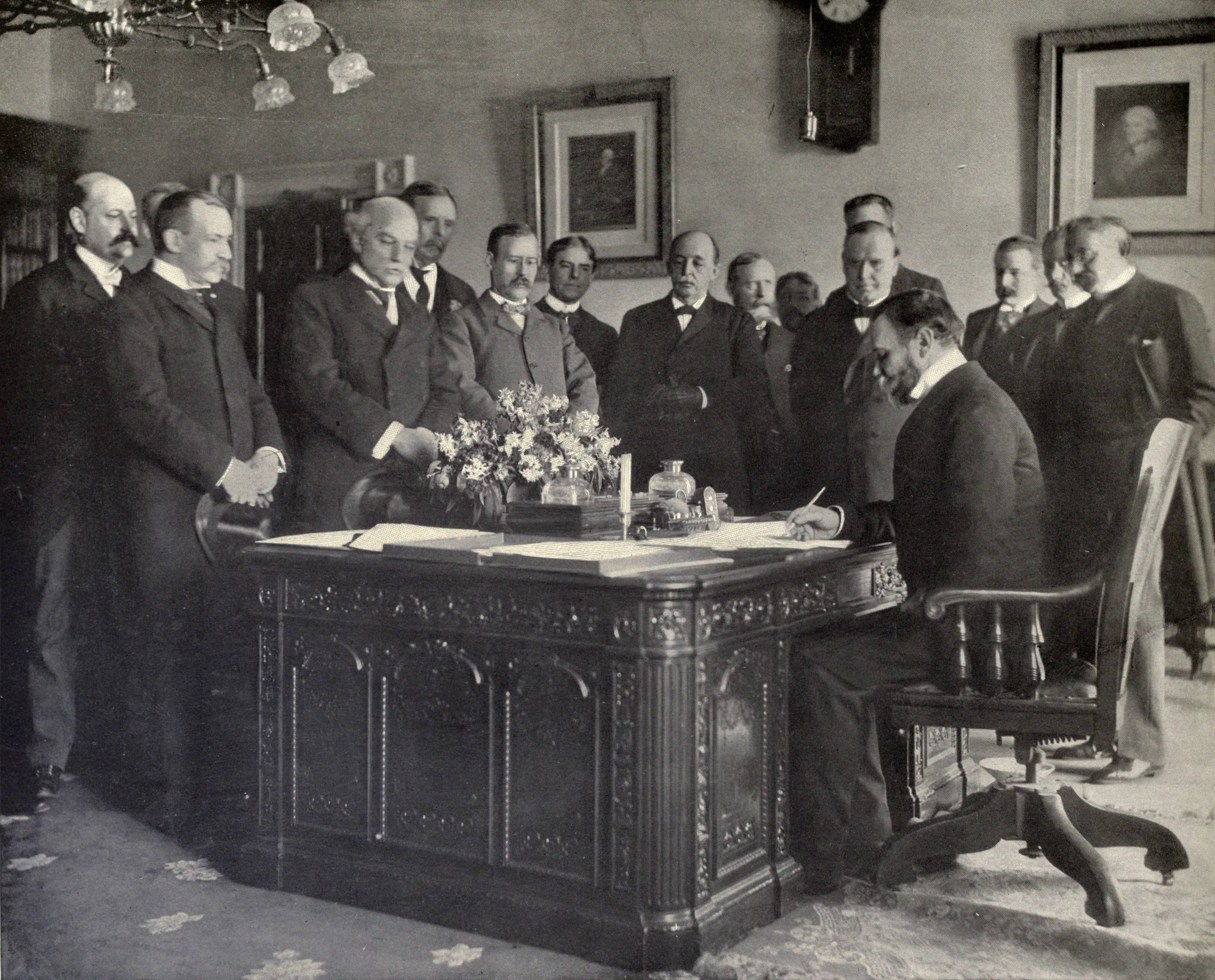
Hay signs the Treaty of Paris, 1899.

By the time Hay took office, the war was effectively over and it had been decided to strip Spain of her overseas empire and transfer at least part of it to the United States. At the time of Hay's swearing-in, McKinley was still undecided whether to take the Philippines, but in October finally decided to do so, and Hay sent instructions to Day and the other peace commissioners to insist on it. Spain yielded, and the result was the Treaty of Paris, narrowly ratified by the Senate in February 1899 over the objections of anti-imperialists.

==== Open Door Policy ====
By the 1890s, China had become a major trading partner for Western nations and newly westernized Japan. China had had its army severely weakened by several disastrous wars, and several foreign nations took the opportunity to negotiate treaties with China that allowed them to control various coastal cities, known as treaty ports, for use as military bases or trading centers. Within those jurisdictions, the nation in possession often gave preference to its own citizens in trade or in developing infrastructure such as railroads. Although the United States did not claim any parts of China, a third of the China trade was carried in American ships, and having an outpost near there was a major factor in deciding to retain the former Spanish colony of the Philippines in the Treaty of Paris.

Hay had been concerned about the Far East since the 1870s. As Ambassador, he had attempted to forge a common policy with the British, but the United Kingdom was willing to acquire territorial concessions in China (such as Hong Kong) to guard its interests there, whereas McKinley was not. In March 1898, Hay warned that Russia, Germany, and France were seeking to exclude Britain and America from the China trade, but he was disregarded by Sherman, who accepted assurances to the contrary from Russia and Germany.

McKinley was of the view that equality of opportunity for American trade in China was key to success there, rather than colonial acquisitions; that Hay shared these views was one reason for his appointment as Secretary of State. Many influential Americans, seeing coastal China being divided into spheres of influence, urged McKinley to join in; still, in his annual message to Congress in December 1898, he stated that as long as Americans were not discriminated against, he saw no need for the United States to become "an actor in the scene".

As Secretary of State, it was Hay's responsibility to put together a workable China policy. He was advised by William Rockhill, an old China hand. Also influential was Lord Charles Beresford, a British Member of Parliament who gave a number of speeches to American businessmen, met with McKinley and Hay, and in a letter to the secretary stated that "it is imperative for American interests as well as our own that the policy of the 'open door' should be maintained". Assuring that all would play on an even playing field in China would give the foreign powers little incentive to dismember the Chinese Empire through territorial acquisition.

In mid-1899, the British inspector of Chinese maritime customs, Alfred Hippisley, visited the United States. In a letter to Rockhill, a friend, he urged that the United States and other powers agree to uniform Chinese tariffs, including in the enclaves. Rockhill passed the letter on to Hay, and subsequently summarized the thinking of Hippisley and others, that there should be "an open market through China for our trade on terms of equality with all other foreigners". Hay was in agreement, but feared Senate and popular opposition, and wanted to avoid Senate ratification of a treaty. Rockhill drafted the first Open Door note, calling for equality of commercial opportunity for foreigners in China.

Hay formally issued his Open Door note on September 6, 1899. This was not a treaty, and did not require the approval of the Senate. Most of the powers had at least some caveats, and negotiations continued through the remainder of the year. On March 20, 1900, Hay announced that all powers had agreed, and he was not contradicted. Former secretary Day wrote to Hay, congratulating him, "moving at the right time and in the right manner, you have secured a diplomatic triumph in the 'open door' in China of the first importance to your country".

==== Boxer Rebellion ====
Little thought was given to the Chinese reaction to the Open Door note; the Chinese minister in Washington, Wu Ting-fang, did not learn of it until he read of it in the newspapers. Among those in China who opposed Western influence there was a movement in Shantung Province, in the north, that became known as the Fists of Righteous Harmony, or Boxers, after the martial arts they practiced. The Boxers were especially angered by missionaries and their converts. As late as June 1900, Rockhill dismissed the Boxers, contending that they would soon disband. By the middle of that month, the Boxers, joined by imperial troops, had cut the railroad between Peking and the coast, killed many missionaries and converts, and besieged the foreign legations. Hay faced a precarious situation; how to rescue the Americans trapped in Peking, and how to avoid giving the other powers an excuse to partition China, in an election year when there was already Democrat opposition to what they deemed American imperialism.

As American troops were sent to China to relieve the nation's legation, Hay sent a letter to foreign powers (often called the Second Open Door note), stating while the United States wanted to see lives preserved and the guilty punished, it intended that China not be dismembered. Hay issued this on July 3, 1900, suspecting that the powers were quietly making private arrangements to divide up China. Communication between the foreign legations and the outside world had been cut off, and the personnel there were falsely presumed slaughtered, but Hay realized that Minister Wu could get a message in, and Hay was able to establish communication. Hay suggested to the Chinese government that it now cooperate for its own good. When the foreign relief force, principally Japanese but including 2,000 Americans, relieved the legations and sacked Peking, China was made to pay a huge indemnity but there was no cession of land.

==== Death of McKinley ====
McKinley's vice president, Garret Hobart, had died in November 1899. Under the laws then in force, this made Hay next in line to the presidency should anything happen to McKinley. There was a presidential election in 1900, and McKinley was unanimously renominated at the Republican National Convention that year. He allowed the convention to make its own choice of running mate, and it selected Roosevelt, by then governor of New York. Senator Hanna bitterly opposed that choice, but nevertheless raised millions for the McKinley/Roosevelt ticket, which was elected.

Hay accompanied McKinley on his nationwide train tour in mid-1901, during which both men visited California and saw the Pacific Ocean for the only times in their lives. The summer of 1901 was tragic for Hay; his older son Adelbert, who had been consul in Pretoria during the Boer War and was about to become McKinley's personal secretary, died in a fall from a hotel window.

Secretary Hay was at The Fells when McKinley was shot by Leon Czolgosz, an anarchist, on September 6 in Buffalo. With Vice President Roosevelt and much of the cabinet hastening to the bedside of McKinley, who had been operated on (it was thought successfully) soon after the shooting, Hay planned to go to Washington to manage the communication with foreign governments, but presidential secretary George Cortelyou urged him to come to Buffalo. He traveled to Buffalo on September 10; hearing on his arrival an account of the President's recovery, Hay responded that McKinley would die. He was more cheerful after visiting McKinley, giving a statement to the press, and went to Washington, as Roosevelt and other officials also dispersed. Hay was about to return to New Hampshire on the 13th, when word came that McKinley was dying. Hay remained at his office and the next morning, on the way to Buffalo, the former Rough Rider received from Hay his first communication as head of state, officially informing President Roosevelt of McKinley's death.

=== Theodore Roosevelt administration ===
==== Staying on ====
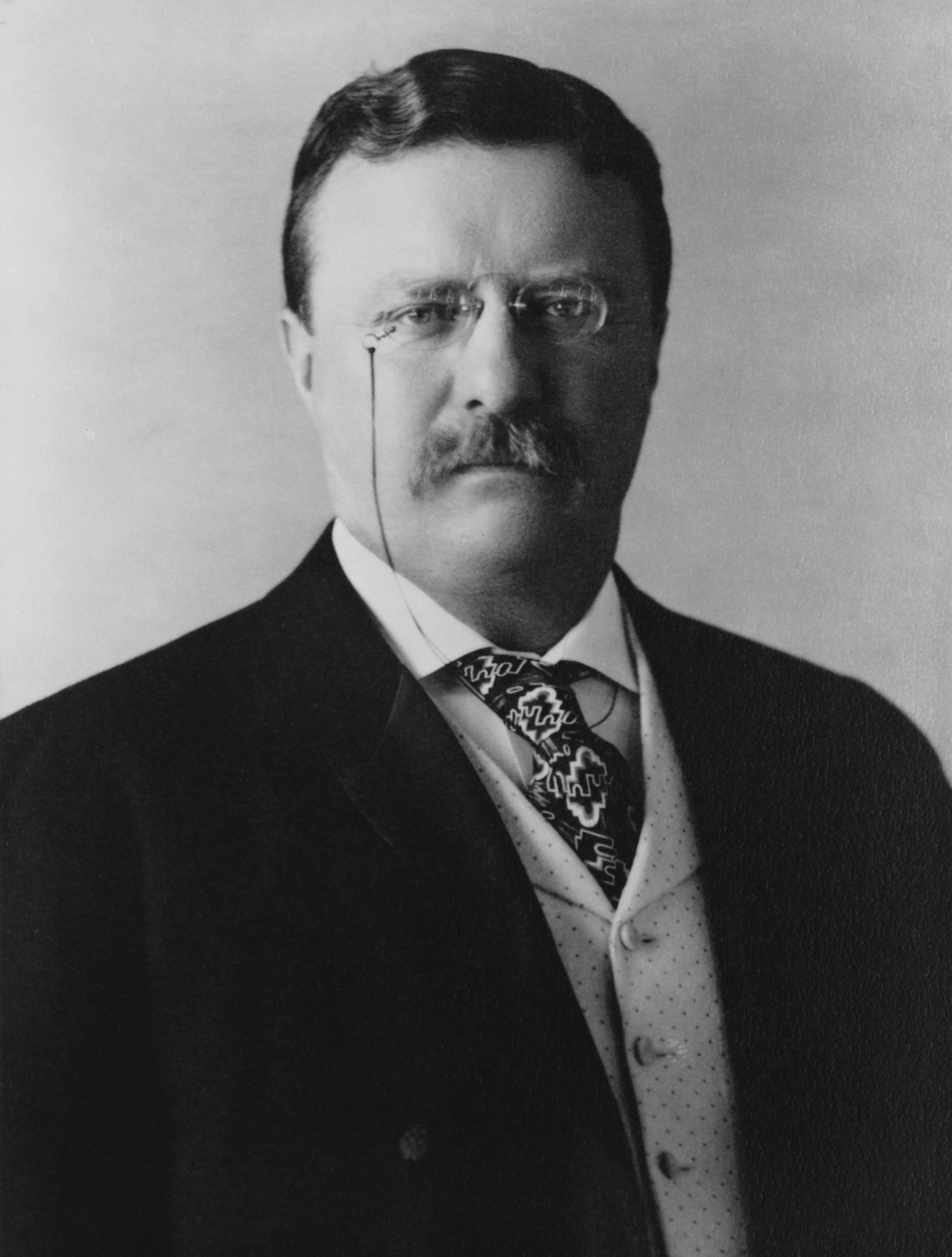
Theodore Roosevelt

Hay, again next in line to the presidency, remained in Washington as McKinley's body was transported to the capital by funeral train, and stayed there as the late president was taken to Canton for interment. He had admired McKinley, describing him as "awfully like Lincoln in many respects" and wrote to a friend, "what a strange and tragic fate it has been of mine—to stand by the bier of three of my dearest friends, Lincoln, Garfield, and McKinley, three of the gentlest of men, all risen to be head of the State, and all done to death by assassins".

Hay in 1902

By letter, Hay offered his resignation to Roosevelt while the new president was still in Buffalo, amid newspaper speculation that Hay would be replaced. When Hay met the funeral train in Washington, Roosevelt greeted him at the station and immediately told him he must stay on as secretary. According to Zeitz, "Roosevelt's accidental ascendance to the presidency made John Hay an essential anachronism ... the wise elder statesman and senior member of the cabinet, he was indispensable to TR, who even today remains the youngest president ever".

The deaths of his son and of McKinley were not the only griefs Hay suffered in 1901—on September 26, John Nicolay died after a long illness, as did Hay's close friend Clarence King on Christmas Eve.

==== Panama ====
Hay's involvement in the efforts to have a canal joining the oceans in Central America went back to his time as Assistant Secretary of State under President Hayes, when he served as translator for Ferdinand de Lesseps in his efforts to interest the American government in investing in his canal company. Hayes was only interested in the idea of a canal under American control, which de Lesseps's project would not be. By the time Hay became Secretary of State, de Lesseps's project in Panama (then a Colombian province) had collapsed, as had an American-run project in Nicaragua. The 1850 Clayton–Bulwer Treaty (between the United States and Britain) forbade the United States from building a Central American canal that it exclusively controlled, and Hay, from early in his tenure, sought the removal of this restriction. But the Canadians, for whose foreign policy Britain was still available, saw the canal matter as their greatest leverage to get other disputes resolved in their favor, and persuaded Salisbury not to resolve it independently. Shortly before Hay took office, Britain and the U.S. agreed to establish a Joint High Commission to adjudicate unsettled matters, which met in late 1898 but made slow progress, especially on the Canada-Alaska boundary.

The Alaska issue became less contentious in August 1899 when the Canadians accepted a provisional boundary pending final settlement. With Congress anxious to begin work on a canal bill, and increasingly likely to ignore the Clayton-Bulwer restriction, Hay and British Ambassador Julian Pauncefote began work on a new treaty in January 1900. The first Hay–Pauncefote Treaty was sent to the Senate the following month, where it met a cold reception, as the terms forbade the United States from blockading or fortifying the canal, that was to be open to all nations in wartime as in peace. The Senate Foreign Relations Committee added an amendment allowing the U.S. to fortify the canal, then in March postponed further consideration until after the 1900 election. Hay submitted his resignation, which McKinley refused. The treaty, as amended, was ratified by the Senate in December, but the British would not agree to the changes.

Despite the lack of agreement, Congress was enthusiastic about a canal, and was inclined to move forward, with or without a treaty. Authorizing legislation was slowed by discussion on whether to take the Nicaraguan or Panamanian route. Much of the negotiation of a revised treaty, allowing the U.S. to fortify the canal, took place between Hay's replacement in London, Joseph H. Choate, and the British Foreign Secretary, Lord Lansdowne, and the second Hay–Pauncefote Treaty was ratified by the Senate by a large margin on December 6, 1901.

Seeing that the Americans were likely to build a Nicaragua Canal, the owners of the defunct French company, including Philippe Bunau-Varilla, who still had exclusive rights to the Panama route, lowered their price. Beginning in early 1902, President Roosevelt became a backer of the latter route, and Congress passed legislation for it, if it could be secured within a reasonable time. In June, Roosevelt told Hay to take personal charge of the negotiations with Colombia. Later that year, Hay began talks with Colombia's acting minister in Washington, Tomás Herrán. The Hay–Herrán Treaty, granting $10 million to Colombia for the right to build a canal, plus $250,000 annually, was signed on January 22, 1903, and ratified by the United States Senate two months later. In August, however, the treaty was rejected by the Colombian Senate.

Roosevelt was minded to build the canal anyway, using an earlier treaty with Colombia that gave the U.S. transit rights in regard to the Panama Railroad. Hay predicted "an insurrection on the Isthmus [of Panama] against that regime of folly and graft ... at Bogotá". Bunau-Varilla gained meetings with both men, and assured them that a revolution, and a Panamanian government more friendly to a canal, was coming. In October, Roosevelt ordered Navy ships to be stationed near Panama. The Panamanians duly revolted in early November 1903, with Colombian interference deterred by the presence of U.S. forces. By prearrangement, Bunau-Varilla was appointed representative of the nascent nation in Washington, and quickly negotiated the Hay–Bunau-Varilla Treaty, signed on November 18, giving the United States the right to build the canal in a zone 10 miles (16 km) wide, over which the U.S. would exercise full jurisdiction. This was less than satisfactory to the Panamanian diplomats who arrived in Washington shortly after the signing, but they did not dare renounce it. The treaty was approved by the two nations, and work on the Panama Canal began in 1904. Hay wrote to Secretary of War Elihu Root, praising "the perfectly regular course which the President did follow" as much preferable to armed occupation of the isthmus.

==== Relationship with Roosevelt, other events ====
Hay had met the President's father, Theodore Roosevelt, Sr., during the Civil War, and during his time at the Tribune came to know the adolescent "Teddy", twenty years younger than himself. Although before becoming president Roosevelt often wrote fulsome letters of praise to Secretary Hay, his letters to others then and later were less complimentary. Hay felt Roosevelt too impulsive, and privately opposed his inclusion on the ticket in 1900, though he quickly wrote a congratulatory note after the convention.

As President and Secretary of State, the two men took pains to cultivate a cordial relationship. Roosevelt read all ten volumes of the Lincoln biography and in mid-1903, wrote to Hay that by then "I have had a chance to know far more fully what a really great Secretary of State you are". Hay for his part publicly praised Roosevelt as "young, gallant, able, [and] brilliant", words that Roosevelt wrote that he hoped would be engraved on his tombstone.

Privately, and in correspondence with others, they were less generous: Hay grumbled that while McKinley would give him his full attention, Roosevelt was always busy with others, and it would be "an hour's wait for a minute's talk". Roosevelt, after Hay's death in 1905, wrote to Senator Lodge that Hay had not been "a great Secretary of State ... under me he accomplished little ... his usefulness to me was almost exclusively the usefulness of a fine figurehead". Nevertheless, when Roosevelt successfully sought election in his own right in 1904, he persuaded the aging and infirm Hay to campaign for him, and Hay gave a speech linking the administration's policies with those of Lincoln: "there is not a principle avowed by the Republican party to-day which is out of harmony with his [Lincoln's] teaching or inconsistent with his character." Kushner and Sherrill suggested that the differences between Hay and Roosevelt were more style than ideological substance.

In December 1902, the German government asked Roosevelt to arbitrate its dispute with Venezuela over unpaid debts. Hay did not think this appropriate, as Venezuela also owed the U.S. money, and quickly arranged for the International Court of Arbitration in The Hague to step in. Hay supposedly said, as final details were being worked out, "I have it all arranged. If Teddy will keep his mouth shut until tomorrow noon!" Hay and Roosevelt also differed over the composition of the Joint High Commission that was to settle the Alaska boundary dispute. The commission was to be composed of "impartial jurists" and the British and Canadians duly appointed notable judges. Roosevelt appointed politicians, including Secretary Root and Senator Lodge. Although Hay was supportive of the President's choices in public, in private he protested loudly to Roosevelt, complained by letter to his friends, and offered his resignation. Roosevelt declined it, but the incident confirmed him in his belief that Hay was too much of an Anglophile to be trusted where Britain was concerned. The American position on the boundary dispute was imposed on Canada by a 4–2 vote, with the one English judge joining the three Americans.

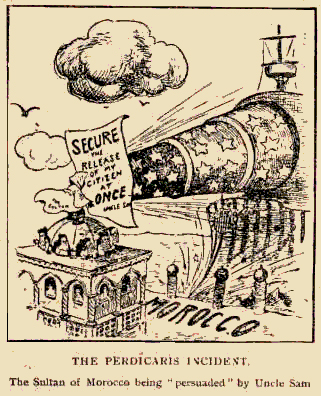
Political cartoon on the Perdicaris affair

One incident involving Hay that benefitted Roosevelt politically was the kidnapping of Greek-American playboy Ion Perdicaris in Morocco (Note: Cromwell Varley, Perdicaris's stepson by his wife's first marriage to an Englishman, was also kidnapped. See Woolman.) by chieftain Mulai Ahmed er Raisuli, an opponent of Sultan Abdelaziz. Raisuli demanded a ransom, but also wanted political prisoners to be released and control of Tangier in place of the military governor. Raisuli supposed Perdicaris to be a wealthy American, and hoped United States pressure would secure his demands. In fact, Perdicaris, though born in New Jersey, had renounced his citizenship during the Civil War to avoid Confederate confiscation of property in South Carolina, and had accepted Greek naturalization, a fact not generally known until years later, but that decreased Roosevelt's appetite for military action. The sultan was ineffective in dealing with the incident, and Roosevelt considered seizing the Tangier waterfront, source of much of Abdelaziz's income, as a means of motivating him. With Raisuli's demands escalating, Hay, with Roosevelt's approval, finally cabled the consul-general in Tangier, Samuel Gummeré:

We want Perdicaris alive or Raisuli dead. We desire least possible complications with Morocco or other Powers. You will not arrange for landing marines or seizing customs house without specific direction from the [State] department.

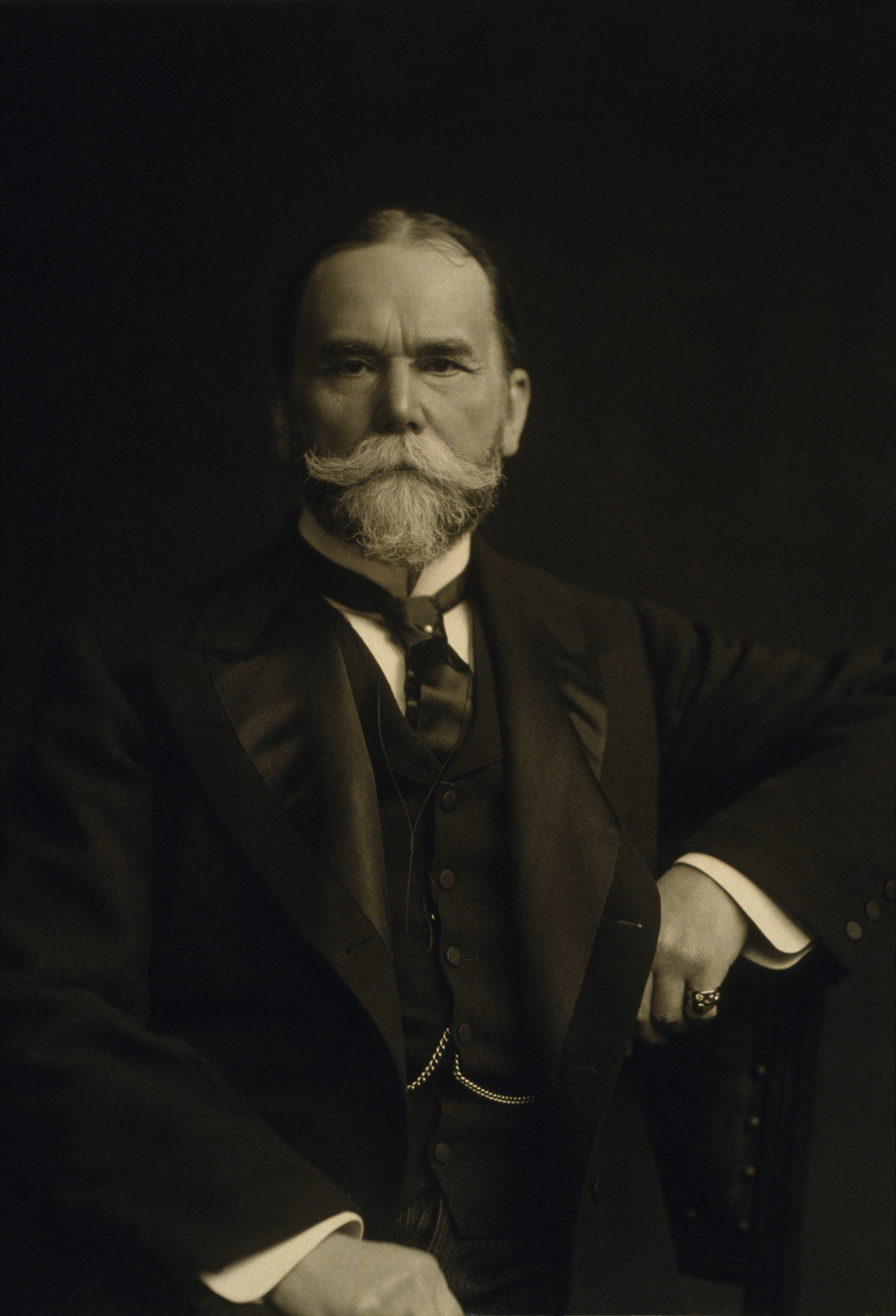
Hay, c. 1904

The 1904 Republican National Convention was in session, and the Speaker of the House, Joseph Cannon, its chair, read the first sentence of the cable—and only the first sentence—to the convention, electrifying what had been a humdrum coronation of Roosevelt. (Note: Woolman, in his 1997 article on the incident, states that Roosevelt was behind Cannon's action. See Woolman.) "The results were perfect. This was the fighting Teddy that America loved, and his frenzied supporters—and American chauvinists everywhere—roared in delight." In fact, by then the sultan had already agreed to the demands, and Perdicaris was released. What was seen as tough talk boosted Roosevelt's election chances.

==== Final months and death ====
Hay never fully recovered from the death of his son Adelbert, writing in 1904 to his close friend Lizzie Cameron that "the death of our boy made my wife and me old, at once and for the rest of our lives". Gale described Hay in his final years as a "saddened, slowly dying old man".

Although Hay gave speeches in support of Roosevelt, he spent much of the fall of 1904 at his New Hampshire house or with his younger brother Charles, who was ill in Boston. After the election, Roosevelt asked Hay to remain another four years. Hay asked for time to consider, but the President did not allow it, announcing to the press two days later that Hay would stay at his post. Early 1905 saw futility for Hay, as a number of treaties he had negotiated were defeated or amended by the Senate—one involving the British dominion of Newfoundland due to Senator Lodge's fears it would harm his fisherman constituents. Others, promoting arbitration, were voted down or amended because the Senate did not want to be bypassed in the settlement of international disputes.

By Roosevelt's inauguration on March 4, 1905, Hay's health was so bad that both his wife and his friend Henry Adams insisted on his going to Europe, where he could rest and get medical treatment. Presidential doctor Presley Rixey issued a statement that Hay was suffering from overwork, but in letters the secretary hinted his conviction that he did not have long to live. An eminent physician in Italy prescribed medicinal baths for Hay's heart condition, and he duly journeyed to Bad Nauheim, near Frankfurt, Germany. Kaiser Wilhelm II was among the monarchs who wrote to Hay asking him to visit, though he declined; Belgian King Leopold II succeeded in seeing him by showing up at his hotel, unannounced. Adams suggested that Hay retire while there was still enough life left in him to do so, and that Roosevelt would be delighted to act as his own Secretary of State. Hay jokingly wrote to sculptor Augustus Saint-Gaudens that "there is nothing the matter with me except old age, the Senate, and one or two other mortal maladies".

After the course of treatment, Hay went to Paris and began to take on his workload again by meeting with the French foreign minister, Théophile Delcassé. In London, King Edward VII broke protocol by meeting with Hay in a small drawing room, and Hay lunched with Whitelaw Reid, ambassador in London at last. There was not time to see all who wished to see Hay on what he knew was his final visit.

On his return to the United States, despite his family's desire to take him to New Hampshire, the secretary went to Washington to deal with departmental business and "say Ave Caesar! to the President", as Hay put it. He was pleased to learn that Roosevelt was well on his way to settling the Russo-Japanese War, an action for which the President would win the Nobel Peace Prize. Hay left Washington for the last time on June 23, 1905, arriving in New Hampshire the following day. He died there on July 1 of his heart ailment and complications. Hay was interred in Lake View Cemetery in Cleveland, near the grave of Garfield, in the presence of Roosevelt and many dignitaries, including Robert Lincoln.

== Literary career ==
=== Early works ===
Hay wrote some poetry while at Brown University, and more during the Civil War. In 1865, early in his Paris stay, Hay penned "Sunrise in the Place de la Concorde", a poem attacking Napoleon III for his reinstitution of the monarchy, depicting the Emperor as having been entrusted with the child Democracy by Liberty, and strangling it with his own hands. In "A Triumph of Order", set in the breakup of the Paris Commune, a boy promises soldiers that he will return from an errand to be executed with his fellow rebels. Much to their surprise, he keeps his word and shouts to them to "blaze away" as "The Chassepots tore the stout young heart,/And saved Society."

In poetry, he sought the revolutionary outcome for other nations that he believed had come to a successful conclusion in the United States. His 1871 poem, "The Prayer of the Romans", recites Italian history up to that time, with the Risorgimento in progress: liberty cannot be truly present until "crosier and crown pass away", when there will be "One freedom, one faith without fetters,/One republic in Italy free!" His stay in Vienna yielded "The Curse of Hungary", in which Hay foresees the end of the Austro-Hungarian Empire. After Hay's death in 1905, William Dean Howells suggested that the Europe-themed poems expressed "(now, perhaps, old-fashioned) American sympathy for all the oppressed." Castilian Days, souvenir of Hay's time in Madrid, is a collection of seventeen essays about Spanish history and customs, first published in 1871, although several of the individual chapters appeared in The Atlantic in 1870. It went through eight editions in Hay's lifetime. The Spanish are depicted as afflicted by the "triple curse of crown, crozier, and saber"—most kings and ecclesiastics are presented as useless—and Hay pins his hope in the republican movement in Spain. Gale deems Castilian Days "a remarkable, if biased, book of essays about Spanish civilization".

And this was all the religion he had—
To treat his engine well,
Never be passed on the river
And mind the pilot's bell.
And if ever the Prairie Belle took fire,—
A hundred times he swore,
He'd hold her nozzle agin the bank
Till the last soul got ashore.

— John Hay, "Jim Bludso" (1871)

Pike County Ballads, a grouping of six poems published (with other Hay poetry) as a book in 1871, brought him great success. Written in the dialect of Pike County, Illinois, where Hay went to school as a child, they are approximately contemporaneous with pioneering poems in similar dialect by Bret Harte and there has been debate as to which came first. The poem that brought the greatest immediate reaction was "Jim Bludso", about a boatman who is "no saint" with one wife in Mississippi and another in Illinois. Yet, when his steamboat catches fire, "He saw his duty, a dead-sure thing,—/And went for it, ther and then." Jim holds the burning steamboat against the riverbank until the last passenger gets ashore, at the cost of his life. Hay's narrator states that, "And Christ ain't a-going to be too hard/On a man that died for men." Hay's poem offended some clergymen, but was widely reprinted and even included in anthologies of verse.

=== The Bread-Winners ===
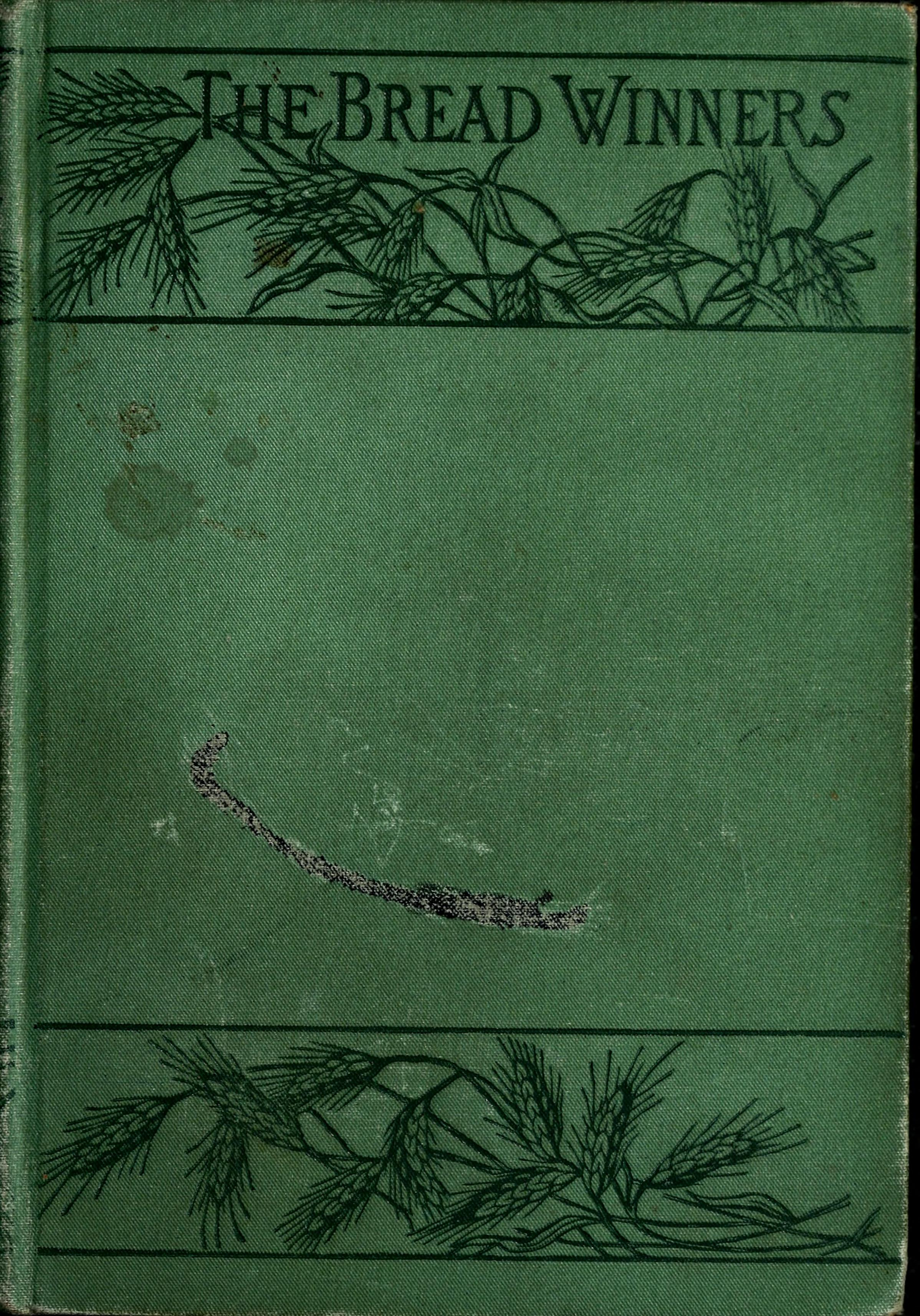
First edition cover of The Bread-Winners (1883)

The Bread-Winners, one of the first novels to take an anti-labor perspective, was published anonymously in 1883 (published editions did not bear Hay's name until 1916) and he may have tried to disguise his writing style. The book examines two conflicts: between capital and labor, and between the nouveau riche and old money. In writing it, Hay was influenced by the labor unrest of the 1870s, that affected him personally, as corporations belonging to Stone, his father-in-law, were among those struck, at a time when Hay had been left in charge in Stone's absence. According to historian Scott Dalrymple, "in response, Hay proceeded to write an indictment of organized labor so scathing, so vehement, that he dared not attach his name to it."

The major character is Arthur Farnham, a wealthy Civil War veteran, likely based on Hay. Farnham, who inherited money, is without much influence in municipal politics, as his ticket is defeated in elections, symbolic of the decreasing influence of America's old-money patricians. The villain is Andrew Jackson Offitt (true name Ananias Offitt), who leads the Bread-winners, a labor organization that begins a violent general strike. Peace is restored by a group of veterans led by Farnham, and, at the end, he appears likely to marry Alice Belding, a woman of his own class.

Although unusual among the many books inspired by the labor unrest of the late 1870s in taking the perspective of the wealthy, it was the most successful of them, and was a sensation, gaining many favorable reviews. It was also attacked as an anti-labor polemic with an upper-class bias. There were many guesses as to authorship, with the supposed authors ranging from Hay's friend Henry Adams to New York Governor Grover Cleveland, and the speculation fueled sales.

=== Lincoln biography ===
Early in his presidency, Hay and Nicolay requested and received permission from Lincoln to write his biography. By 1872, Hay was "convinced that we ought to be at work on our 'Lincoln.' I don't think the time for publication has come, but the time for preparation is slipping away." Robert Lincoln in 1874 formally agreed to let Hay and Nicolay use his father's papers; by 1875, they were engaged in research. Hay and Nicolay enjoyed exclusive access to Lincoln's papers, which were not opened to other researchers until 1947. They gathered documents written by others, as well as many of the Civil War books already being published. They at rare times relied on memory, such as Nicolay's recollection of the moment at the 1860 Republican convention when Lincoln was nominated, but for much of the rest relied on research.

Hay began his part of the writing in 1876; the work was interrupted by illnesses of Hay, Nicolay, or family members, or by Hay's writing of The Bread-Winners. By 1885, Hay had completed the chapters on Lincoln's early life, and they were submitted to Robert Lincoln for approval. Sale of the serialization rights to The Century magazine, edited by Hay's friend Richard Gilder, helped give the pair the impetus to bring what had become a massive project to an end.

The published work, Abraham Lincoln: A History, alternates parts in which Lincoln is at center with discussions of contextual matters, such as legislative events or battles. The first serial installment, published in November 1886, received positive reviews. When the ten-volume set emerged in 1890, it was not sold in bookstores, but instead door-to-door, then a common practice. Despite a price of $50, and the fact that a good part of the work had been serialized, five thousand copies were quickly sold. The books helped forge the modern view of Lincoln as great war leader, against competing narratives that gave more credit to subordinates such as Seward. According to historian Joshua Zeitz, "it is easy to forget how widely underrated Lincoln the president and Lincoln the man were at the time of his death and how successful Hay and Nicolay were in elevating his place in the nation's collective historical memory."

== Assessment and legacy ==
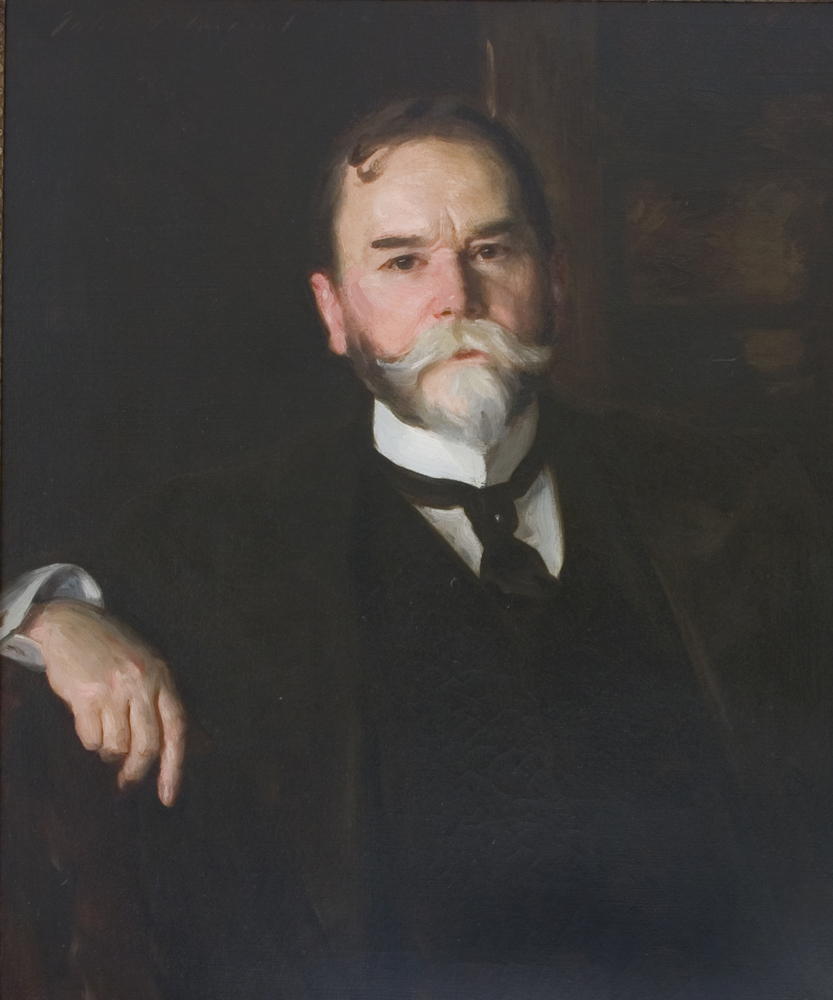
Hay in portrait by John Singer Sargent

In 1902, Hay wrote that when he died, "I shall not be much missed except by my wife." Nevertheless, due to his premature death at age 66, he was survived by most of his friends. These included Adams, who although he blamed the pressures of Hay's office, where he was badgered by Roosevelt and many senators, for the Secretary of State's death, admitted that Hay had remained in the position because he feared being bored. He memorialized his friend in the final pages of his autobiographical The Education of Henry Adams: with Hay's death, his own education had ended.

Gale pointed out that Hay "accomplished a great deal in the realm of international statesmanship, and the world may be a better place because of his efforts as secretary of state ... the man was a scintillating ambassador". Yet, Gale felt, any assessment of Hay must include negatives as well, that after his marriage to the wealthy Clara Stone, Hay "allowed his deep-seated love of ease triumph over his Middle Western devotion to work and a fair shake for all." Despite his literary accomplishments, Hay "was often lazy. His first poetry was his best."

External videos
- Q&A interview with John Taliaferro on All the Great Prizes: The Life of John Hay, from Lincoln to Roosevelt, July 21, 2013, C-SPAN
- Presentation by Joshua Zeitz on Lincoln’s Boys: John Hay, John Nicolay, and the War for Lincoln's Image, February 4, 2014, C-SPAN

Taliaferro suggests that "if Hay put any ... indelible stamp on history, perhaps it was that he demonstrated how the United States ought to comport itself. He, not Roosevelt, was the adult in charge when the nation and the State Department attained global maturity." He quotes John St. Loe Strachey, "All that the world saw was a great gentleman and a great statesman doing his work for the State and for the President with perfect taste, perfect good sense, and perfect good humour".

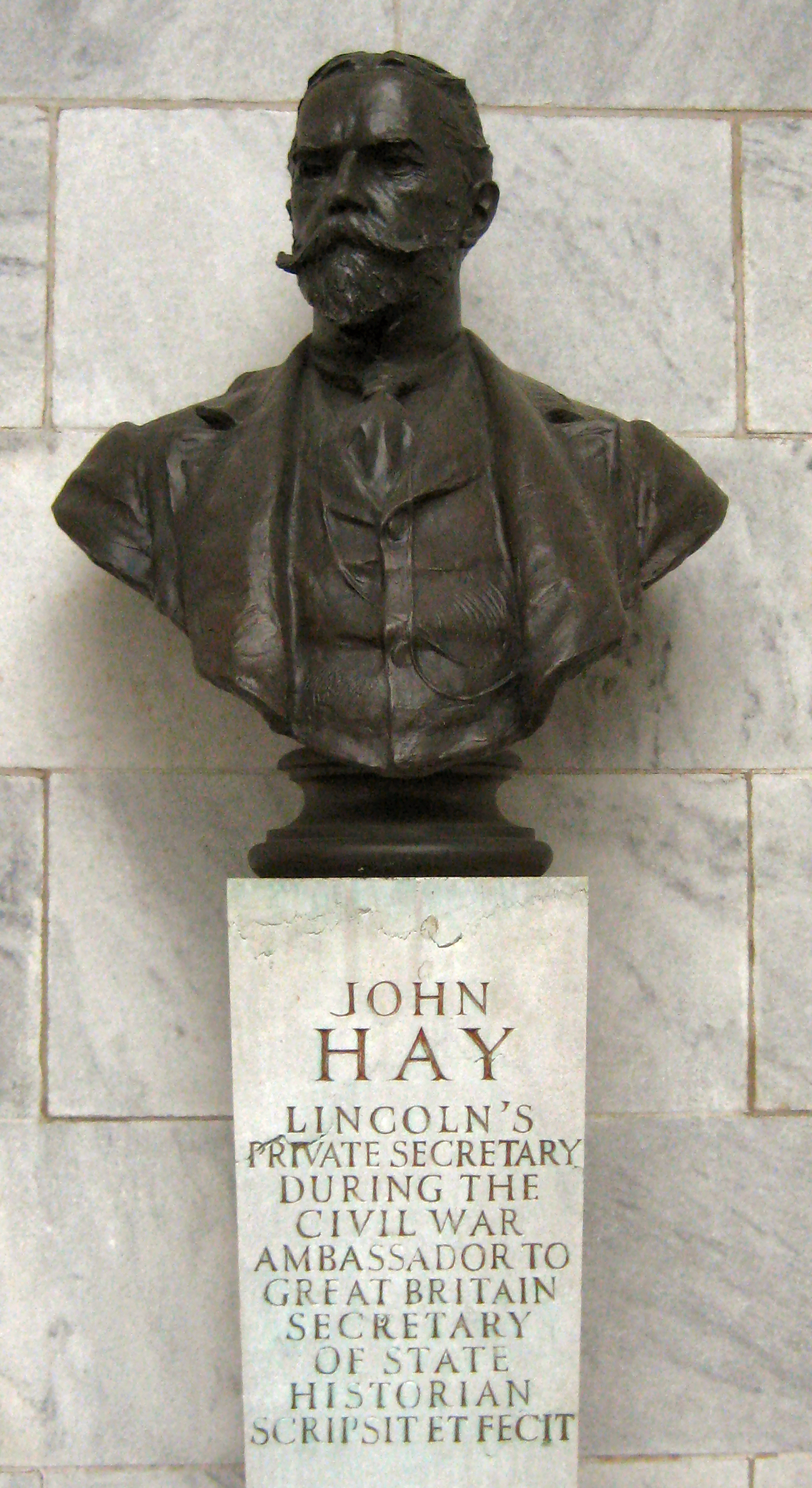
Posthumous bust of John Hay (1915–17), by J. Massey Rhind, inside the National McKinley Birthplace Memorial

Hay's efforts to shape Lincoln's image increased his own prominence and reputation in making his association (and that of Nicolay) with the assassinated president ever more remarkable and noteworthy. According to Zeitz, "the greater Lincoln grew in death, the greater they grew for having known him so well, and so intimately, in life. Everyone wanted to know them if only to ask what it had been like—what he had been like." Their answer to that, expressed in ten volumes of biography, Gale wrote, "has been incredibly influential". In 1974, Lincoln scholar Roy P. Basler stated that later biographers such as Carl Sandburg did not "ma[k]e revisions of the essential story told by N.[icolay] & H.[ay]. Zeitz concurs, "Americans today understand Abraham Lincoln much as Nicolay and Hay hoped that they would."

Hay brought about more than 50 treaties, including the Canal-related treaties, and settlement of the Samoan dispute, as a result of which the United States secured what became known as American Samoa. In 1900, Hay negotiated a treaty with Denmark for the cession of the Danish West Indies. That treaty failed in the Danish parliament on a tied vote.

In 1923 Mount Hay, also known as Boundary Peak 167 on the Canada–United States border, was named after John Hay in recognition of his role in negotiating the US-Canada treaty resulting in the Alaska Boundary Tribunal. Brown University's John Hay Library is named for him as well. Hay's New Hampshire estate has been conserved by various organizations. Although he and his family never lived there (Hay died while it was under construction), the Hay-McKinney House, home to the Cleveland History Center and thousands of artifacts, serves to remind Clevelanders of John Hay's lengthy service. During World War II the Liberty ship SS John Hay was built in Panama City, Florida, and named in his honor. Camp John Hay, a United States military base established in 1903 in Baguio, Philippines, was named for John Hay, and the base name was maintained by the Philippine government even after its 1991 turnover to Philippine authorities.

According to historian Lewis L. Gould, in his account of McKinley's presidency,

One of the most entertaining and interesting letter writers who ever ran the State Department, the witty, dapper, and bearded Hay left behind an abundance of documentary evidence on his public career. His name is indelibly linked with that verity of the nation's Asian policy, the Open Door, and he contributed much to the resolution of the longstanding problems with the British. Patient, discreet, and judicious, Hay deserves to stand in the front rank of secretaries of state.

== See also ==
- History of U.S. foreign policy, 1897–1913

== Bibliography ==
=== Books ===
- Ackerman, Kenneth D. (2011). Dark Horse: The Surprise Election and Political Murder of President James A. Garfield (Kindle ed.). Falls Church, VA: Viral History Press, LLC. ISBN 978-1-61945-011-0.
- Dennett, Tyler (1934). John Hay From Poetry To Politics. Dodd, Mead & Company.
- Gale, Robert L. (1978). John Hay. Twayne's American Authors. Boston: Twayne Publishers. ISBN 0-8057-7199-9.
- Gould, Lewis L. (1980). The Presidency of William McKinley. American Presidency. Lawrence, Kansas: University Press of Kansas. ISBN 978-0-7006-0206-3.
- Kushner, Howard I.; Sherrill, Anne Hummel (1977). John Milton Hay: The Union of Poetry and Politics. Twayne's World Leaders. Boston: Twayne Publishers. ISBN 0-8057-7719-9.
- Leech, Margaret (1959). In the Days of McKinley. New York: Harper and Brothers. OCLC 456809.
- Taliaferro, John (2013). All the Great Prizes: The Life of John Hay, from Lincoln to Roosevelt (Kindle ed.). New York: Simon & Schuster. ISBN 978-1-4165-9741-4.
- Thayer, William Roscoe (1915). The Life and Letters of John Hay. Vol. I. Boston: Houghton Mifflin Company. OCLC 445576.
- Thayer, William Roscoe (1915). The Life and Letters of John Hay. Vol. II. Boston: Houghton Mifflin Company. ISBN 978-1-4047-6198-8. OCLC 445576.
- Zeitz, Joshua (2014). Lincoln's Boys: John Hay, John Nicolay, and the War for Lincoln's Image (Kindle ed.). New York: Viking Penguin. ISBN 978-1-101-63807-1.

=== Journals and other sources ===
- Dalrymple, Scott (Fall 1999). "John Hay's Revenge: Anti-Labor Novels, 1880–1905" (PDF). Business and Economic History. 28 (1): 133–42. Archived from the original (PDF) on May 14, 2013.
- Friedlaender, Marc (1969). "Henry Hobson Richardson, Henry Adams, and John Hay". Proceedings of the Massachusetts Historical Society. Third Series. 81: 137–66. JSTOR 25080672.(subscription required)
- Howells, William Dean (September 1905). "John Hay in Literature". The North American Review. 181 (586): 343–51. JSTOR 25105451.(subscription required)
- Jaher, Frederic Cople (Spring 1972). "Industrialism and the American Aristocrat: A Social Study of John Hay and His Novel, the Bread-Winners". Journal of the Illinois State Historical Society. 65 (1): 69–93. JSTOR 40190942.(subscription required)
- Kushner, Howard I. (September 1974). "'The Strong God Circumstance': The Political Career of John Hay". Journal of the Illinois State Historical Society. 67 (4): 352–84. JSTOR 40191317.(subscription required)
- Sloane, David E. E. (Fall 1969). "John Hay's The Bread-Winners as Literary Realism". American Literary Realism, 1870–1910. 2 (3): 276–79. JSTOR 27747664.(subscription required)
- Stevenson Jr., James D.; Stevenson, Randehl K. (Spring–Summer 2006). "John Milton Hay's Literary Influence". Journal of the Illinois State Historical Society. 99 (1): 19–27. JSTOR 40193908.(subscription required)
- Woolman, David (October 1997). "Did Theodore Roosevelt Overreact When an American was Kidnapped in Morocco? Were Seven Warships Really Necessary?". Military History. 14 (4).
- Zeitz, Joshua (February 2014). "Lincoln's Boys: John Hay, John Nicolay and the War For Lincoln's Image". Smithsonian. 44 (10).

Political offices
Preceded by Frederick W. Seward	United States Assistant Secretary of State; 1879–1881	Succeeded by Robert R. Hitt
Preceded by William R. Day	U.S. Secretary of State; Served under: William McKinley, Theodore Roosevelt; 1898–1905	Succeeded by Elihu Root
Diplomatic posts
Preceded by Thomas F. Bayard	United States Ambassador to the United Kingdom; 1897–1898	Succeeded by Joseph H. Choate
