= Adelbert S. Hay =

American consul and politician

Adelbert "Del" Hay
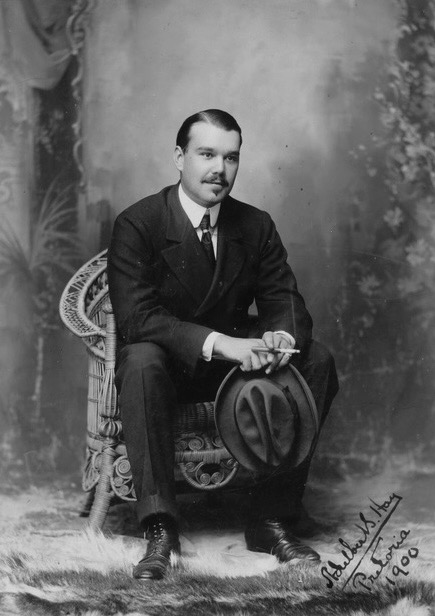
- Hay photographed c. 1900
- Born: November 1, 1876; United States
- Died: June 23, 1901 (aged 24); New Haven, Connecticut, US
- Resting place: Cleveland, Ohio, US
- Education: Yale University
- Occupations: Consul; Politician
- Political party: Republican
- Parent(s): John Milton Hay; Clara Louise Stone

Adelbert Stone Hay (November 1, 1876 – June 23, 1901) was an American consul, politician and son of U.S. Secretary of State John Hay.

== Life and death ==
Hay was the eldest son of John Milton Hay, who served as United States Secretary of State and the United States Ambassador to Great Britain and Clara Louise Stone. He graduated from Yale in 1898.

Around 1900, Hay was appointed the United States Consul at Pretoria in South Africa during the Boer War. While in South Africa, Hay was in charge of 6,000 British prisoners of war in Pretoria and the financial interests of the British citizens there.

On June 23, 1901, Hay died at age 24 when he fell 60 feet (18 m) from a window in the New Haven House, in New Haven, Connecticut. The San Francisco Call speculated that Hay was sitting on the window for air, eventually fell asleep and fell to his death. Other possible theories include that he was simply drunk. Hay would be interred in Cleveland, Ohio. At the time of his death, Hay was in the infancy of his political career, having just been appointed assistant secretary of the President William McKinley. The elder Hay and his wife were grief-stricken by the death of their son.
