= SS John Hay =

Liberty ship of WWII

History

United States
- Name: John Hay
- Namesake: John Hay
- Owner: War Shipping Administration (WSA)
- Operator: A.H. Bull & Co., Inc.
- Ordered: as type (EC2-S-C1) hull, MC hull 1525
- Builder: J.A. Jones Construction, Panama City, Florida
- Cost: $1,859,804
- Yard number: 7
- Way number: 1
- Laid down: 5 January 1943
- Launched: 31 May 1943
- Sponsored by: Mrs. L.R. Sanford
- Completed: 30 June 1943
- Identification: Call Signal: KLZN
- Fate: Laid up in the National Defense Reserve Fleet, Suisun Bay Group, 12 February 1946; Laid up in the National Defense Reserve Fleet, Olympia, Washington, 29 June 1955; Sold for scrapping, 15 December 1960

General characteristics
- Class & type: Liberty ship; type EC2-S-C1, standard
- Tonnage: 10,865 LT DWT; 7,176 GRT
- Displacement: 3,380 long tons (3,434 t) (light); 14,245 long tons (14,474 t) (max)
- Length: 441 feet 6 inches (135 m) oa; 416 feet (127 m) pp; 427 feet (130 m) lwl
- Beam: 57 feet (17 m)
- Draft: 27 ft 9.25 in (8.4646 m)
- Installed power: 2 × Oil fired 450 °F (232 °C) boilers, operating at 220 psi (1,500 kPa); 2,500 hp (1,900 kW)
- Propulsion: 1 × triple-expansion steam engine, (manufactured by Vulcan Iron Works, Wilkes-Barre, Pennsylvania); 1 × screw propeller
- Speed: 11.5 knots (21.3 km/h; 13.2 mph)
- Capacity: 562,608 cubic feet (15,931 m^{3}) (grain); 499,573 cubic feet (14,146 m^{3}) (bale)
- Complement: 38–62 USMM; 21–40 USNAG
- Armament: Varied by ship; Bow-mounted 3-inch (76 mm)/50-caliber gun; Stern-mounted 4-inch (102 mm)/50-caliber gun; 2–8 × single 20-millimeter (0.79 in) Oerlikon anti-aircraft (AA) cannons and/or, 2–8 × 37-millimeter (1.46 in) M1 AA guns

SS John Hay was a Liberty ship built in the United States during World War II. She was named after John Hay, private secretary and assistant to Abraham Lincoln, the 12th United States Assistant Secretary of State, United States Ambassador to the United Kingdom, and United States Secretary of State under Presidents William McKinley and Theodore Roosevelt.

== Construction ==
John Hay was laid down on 5 January 1943, under a Maritime Commission (MARCOM) contract, MC hull 1525, by J.A. Jones Construction, Panama City, Florida; she was sponsored by Mrs. L.R. Sanford, wife MARCOM regional director ship construction Gulf-Coast, and launched on 31 May 1943.

== History ==
She was allocated to A.H. Bull & Co., Inc., on 30 June 1943. On 12 February 1946, she was laid up in the National Defense Reserve Fleet, in the Suisun Bay Group. On 16 May 1955, she was withdrawn from the fleet to be loaded with grain under the "Grain Program 1955", she transferred, loaded with grain, to the National Defense Reserve Fleet, in Olympia, Washington, on 29 June 1955. She was withdrawn from the fleet on 23 June 1957, to have the grain unloaded, she returned empty on 28 June 1957. On 15 December 1960, she was sold for $54,031.33 to Commercial Metals Co., for scrapping. She was removed from the fleet on 11 January 1960.

== Bibliography ==
- "Jones Construction, Panama City FL". www.ShipbuildingHistory.com. 13 October 2010.
- Maritime Administration. "John Hay". Ship History Database Vessel Status Card. U.S. Department of Transportation, Maritime Administration.
- "Liberty Ships – World War II".
- Davies, James (May 2004). "Specifications (As-Built)" (PDF). p. 23.
- "SS John Hay".
