= Pike County Ballads =

- Third edition (1912 - Houghton, Mifflin)
- Author: John Hay
- Language: English
- Genre: Poetry
- Publisher: James R. Osgood
- Publication date: 1871
- Publication place: United States
- Pages: 88
- ISBN: 1885852258

Pike County Ballads is an 1871 book by John Hay. The collection of post Civil War poems is one of the first works to introduce vernacular styles of writing. Published originally in 1871, a 2nd edition was published in 1890 and a 3rd edition in 1912 by the Houghton Mifflin Company containing 35 illustrations by N.C. Wyeth.
