= Joshua Zeitz =

American historian (born 1974)

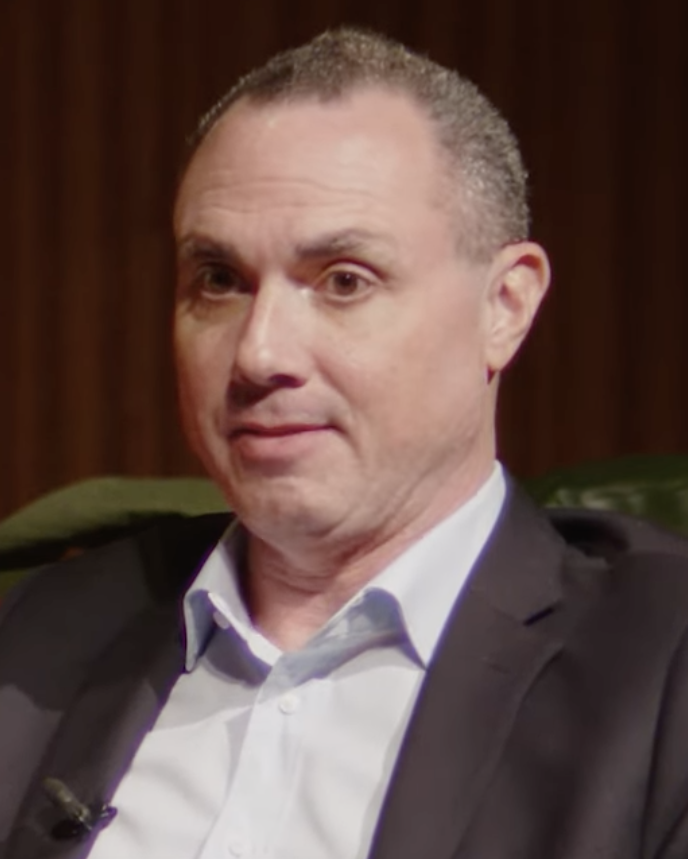
- Born: Joshua Michael Zeitz; 1974 (age 51–52); Trenton, New Jersey, U.S.
- Education: Swarthmore College (BA); Brown University (MA, PhD)
- Occupation: Historian
- Website: joshuamzeitz.com

Joshua Michael Zeitz (born 1974) is an American historian and former Democratic politician. He is the author of several books on American political and social history and has written for the New York Times, Washington Post, Los Angeles Times, The New Republic, The Atlantic, Dissent, and American Heritage. Zeitz appeared as a commentator on two PBS documentaries – Boomer Century, and Ken Burns' Prohibition — and has commented on public policy matters on CNBC and CNN International. He has held faculty positions at Harvard, Cambridge and Princeton and is the author of four books.

== Biography ==
=== Background ===
Zeitz is Jewish and was born in Trenton and raised in Bordentown, where he attended Bordentown Regional High School, which inducted him into its hall of fame in 1990. He obtained his B.A. from Swarthmore College (1996), with Highest Honors, and earned a M.A. (1998) and a Ph.D. (2002) in American history from Brown University. He is the author of three books, co-author and editor of a high school history textbook, and has written numerous academic and non-academic articles. Zeitz has held academic positions at Harvard University, Princeton University, and University of Cambridge. In 2008 Zeitz ran as a Democrat for Congress representing New Jersey's 4th district. He was defeated by incumbent Chris Smith 32% to 66%.

=== Academic positions ===
Zeitz has held several academic positions including:

- Lecturer on History and Literature, Harvard University (2001–03)
- Lecturer on American history and Director of Studies in History, Pembroke College, Cambridge University (2003–07)
- Lecturer, Woodrow Wilson School, Princeton University (2010-2011)

== Books ==
Zeitz has written six books. Zeitz's most recent book, Lincoln's God: How Faith Transformed a President and a Nation, was published by Viking Press in 2023.

== Bibliography ==
=== Books ===
- Joshua Zeitz. (2006), Flapper: A Madcap Story of Sex, Style, Celebrity, and the Women Who Made America Modern, Three Rivers Press, ISBN 978-1-4000-8054-0
- Joshua M. Zeitz. (2007), White Ethnic New York: Jews, Catholics, and the Shaping of Postwar Politics, The University of North Carolina Press, ISBN 978-0-8078-3095-6
- Keller, Morton; Zeitz, Joshua; Klee, Mary Beth; Holdren, John, eds. (2009), The American Odyssey: A History of the United States, K12, ISBN 978-1601530349
- Joshua Zeitz. (2014), Lincoln's Boys: John Hay, John Nicolay, and the War for Lincoln's Image, Viking, ISBN 978-0670025664
- Joshua Zeitz. (2018), Building the Great Society: Inside Lyndon Johnson's White House, Viking, ISBN 978-0-5254-2878-7
- Joshua Zeitz. (2023), Lincoln's God: How Faith Transformed a President and a Nation, Viking, ISBN 978-1984882219

=== Articles and Commentary ===
Zeitz's articles and commentary in the popular press include:

- "Does the White Working Class Really Vote Against Its Own Interests?" Politico, December 31, 2017.
- "When America Hated Catholics" Politico, September 23, 2015.
- "If Guns Make Us Safer, Why Not Let Them Into the U.S. Capitol?" Politico, July 18, 2015.
- "Fact-Checking Lincoln," The Atlantic, November 12, 2012.
- "Chris Christie's Summer of Self Promotion," The Atlantic, August 7, 2012.
- "1964: The Year the 60s Began," American Heritage Magazine, October 2006
- "Boomer Century," American Heritage Magazine, October 2005, 32-48
- "Saving Grace," The New Republic (Online), December 30, 2004
- "Miller's Crossing," The New Republic (Online), September 1, 2004
- "The Big Lie About the Little Pill," New York Times, December 27, 2003
- "Disunited Nations," American Heritage Magazine, August/September 2003
- "The Fall (and Potential Rise) of Liberalism," Los Angeles Times, December 22, 2002, M2
- "Dixie's Victory," American Heritage Magazine, September 2002, 46-55
- "Are Our Liberties in Peril?" American Heritage Magazine, November/December 2001, 34-37
- "Back to the Barricades," American Heritage Magazine, October 2001, 70-75
- "Rebel Redemption Redux," Dissent (Winter 2001), cover 30-37
- "Impeach Andrew Johnson!" The New Republic, January 18, 1999, cover, 13-1

Zeitz's academic writings include

- Zeitz, Joshua (2008), "Rejecting the Center: Radical Grassroots Politics in the 1970s -- Second-Wave Feminism as a Case Study", Journal of Contemporary History, vol. 43, no. 4, SAGE Publications, pp. 673–688, doi:10.1177/0022009408095422, JSTOR 40543229, S2CID 153550017
- Zeitz, Joshua Michael (2000), "The Missouri Compromise Reconsidered: Antislavery Rhetoric and the Emergence of the Free Labor Synthesis", Journal of the Early Republic, vol. 20, no. 3, University of Pennsylvania Press, pp. 447–485, doi:10.2307/3125065, JSTOR 3125065
- Zeitz, Joshua Michael (2000), ""If I Am Not for Myself ... ": The American Jewish Establishment in the Aftermath of the Six Day War", American Jewish History, vol. 88, no. 2, The Johns Hopkins University Press, pp. 253–286, doi:10.1353/ajh.2000.0045, S2CID 162230905
