= 1st Company Massachusetts Sharpshooters =

- Active: September 2, 1861, to September 6, 1864
- Country: United States
- Allegiance: Union
- Branch: United States Army
- Type: Sharpshooters
- Engagements: Battle of Ball's Bluff; Siege of Yorktown; Battle of Fair Oaks; Seven Days Battles; Battle of Antietam; Battle of Fredericksburg; Mud March; Battle of Chancellorsville; Battle of Gettysburg; Mine Run Campaign; Battle of the Wilderness; Battle of Spotsylvania Court House; Battle of Cold Harbor; Siege of Petersburg; First Battle of Deep Bottom; Second Battle of Deep Bottom; Second Battle of Ream's Station

Commanders
- Captain: John Saunders
- Captain: William Plumer

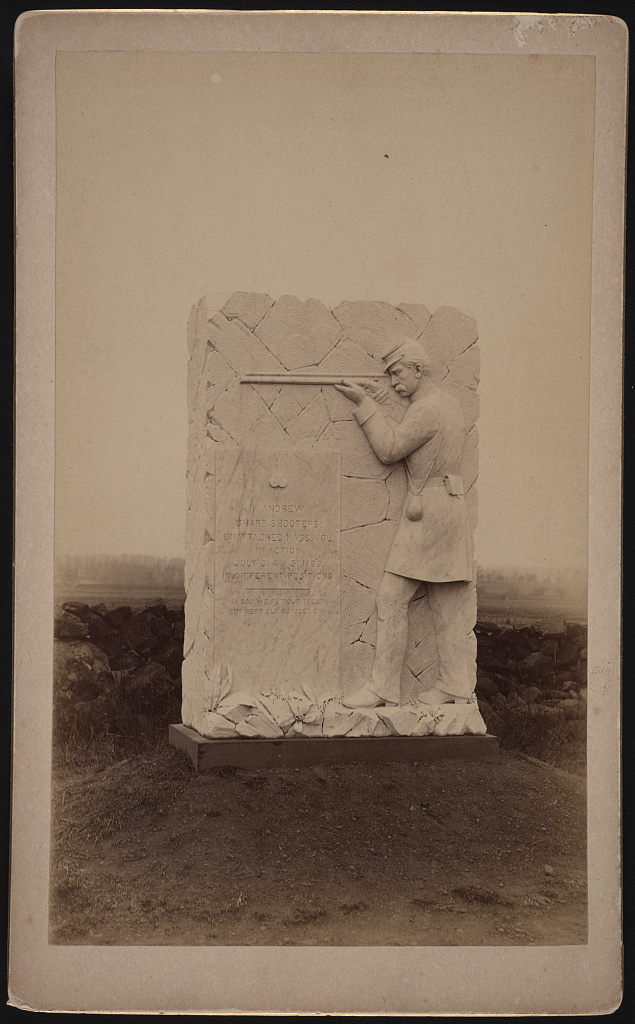
Monument to the 1st Massachusetts Sharpshooters at Gettysburg

The 1st Company Massachusetts Sharpshooters was a sharpshooter unit in the Union Army during the American Civil War.

== Service ==
The 1st Company Massachusetts Sharpshooters was organized in Lynn, Massachusetts, and mustered in for three years service on September 2, 1861. The company was originally recruited for Colonel Hiram Berdan's sharpshooter regiments. When the men were informed that they would lose their enlistment bounty, they declined to join Berdan's regiments and instead remained independent. Most of the recruits tended to be skilled workmen who were competitive shooters tending to be older than the average Union soldier, and these men also tended to be of the larger physical size. They were armed with heavy, custom target rifles and Sharps rifles during their service.

The company was attached to 3rd Brigade, 2nd Division, II Corps, Army of the Potomac, but nominally operated with the 15th Massachusetts Infantry to July 1864, and with the 19th Massachusetts Infantry to September 1864.

The 1st Company Massachusetts Sharpshooters mustered out September 6, 1864.

=== Detailed service ===
==== 1861 ====
- Left Massachusetts for Washington, D.C., September 2.
- Picket and outpost duty on the Upper Potomac River from Conrad's Ferry to Harrison's Island until October 20.
- Operations on the Potomac River October 21–24.
- Battle of Ball's Bluff October 21.
- At Harpers Ferry and Bolivar Heights until March 7, 1862.

==== 1862 ====
- At Charlestown until March 10. Capt. John Saunders of Salem, MA commanding
- At Berryville until March 13.
- Movement toward Winchester and return to Bolivar Heights March 13–15.
- The Peninsula campaign (March 17-August 4)
  - Moved to Fortress Monroe March 22-April 1.
  - Siege of Yorktown April 5-May 4. — Attached to Gorman's 1st Brigade, Sedgwick's 2nd Division, Sumner's II Corps, McClellan's Army of the Potomac
  - Battle of Fair Oaks, Seven Pines, May 31-June 1.
  - Seven Days before Richmond June 25-July 1. — Attached to Sully's 1st Brigade, Sedgwick's 2nd Division, Sumner's II Corps
    - Peach Orchard and Battle of Savage's Station June 29.
    - White Oak Swamp and Glendale June 30.
    - Battle of Malvern Hill July 1.
  - At Harrison's Landing until August 15.
- Movement to Alexandria August 15–28
- To Centreville, Second Battle of Bull Run August 29–30.
- Cover Pope's retreat August 31-September 1.
- Battle of Antietam, September 16–17. — Attached to Gorman's 1st Brigade, Sedgwick's 2nd Division, Sumner's II Corps — Supported II Corps attack, sniping at opposing officers and snipers. Captain Sanders killed with nine others.
- Moved to Harpers Ferry September 22 and duty there until October 30.
- Movement to Falmouth, Va., October 30-November 20.
- On Picket, Falmouth to 12 December — 9 December, eighteen men on muster roll. Captain William Plummer of Cambridge, MA, arrived with forty recruits and took command of the company.
- Battle of Fredericksburg December 12–15. — Attached to Sully's 1st Brigade, Howard's 2nd Division, Couch's II Corps — Provided counter-sniper fire during construction of pontoon bridges and crossing 11 and 12 December. Set up positions on outskirts of city below Marye's Heights targeting artillerymen on the heights.

==== 1863 ====
- "Mud March" January 20–24.
- Chancellorsville Campaign April 27-May 6. — Attached to Gibbon's 2nd Division, Couch's II Corps, Hooker's Army of the Potomac
  - Maryes Heights, Second Battle of Fredericksburg, May 3.
  - Salem Heights May 3–4.
  - Banks' Ford May 4.
- Battle of Gettysburg, July 2–4. — Attached to Gibbon's/Harrow's 2nd Division, Hancock's/Gibbon's/Hays' (Note: After the death of General Reynolds, General Hancock was assigned to the command of all troops on the field of battle, relieving General Howard, who had succeeded General Reynolds. General Gibbon, of the Second Division, assumed command of the corps. These assignments terminated on the evening of July 1. Similar changes in commanders occurred during the battle of the 2nd, when General Hancock was put in command of the Third Corps in addition to that of his own. He was wounded on the 3rd, and Brigadier General William Hays was assigned to the command of the corps.) II Corps, Meade's Army of the Potomac —

(Note: "Arrived morning 2 July, positioned at rock wall on the north end of Cemetery Ridge, several squads were detached and sent to different parts of the line. Cleared out Confederate snipers occupying Bliss farm. In late afternoon, when II Corps retook Bliss farm, a squad went with them to snipe from the farm. No losses 2 July. On 3 July, unit dueled with Confederate snipers in buildings in Gettysburg facing Cemetery Hill and Ridge. During Pickett's Charge, unit concentrated targeting on officers. Suffered four dead, three wounded.")

- Advance from the Rappahannock to the Rapidan September 13–17.
- Bristoe Campaign October 9–22. — Attached to Webb's 2nd Division, Warren's II Corps, Meade's Army of the Potomac
  - Battle of Bristoe Station October 14.
- Advance to line of the Rappahannock, Second Battle of Rappahannock Station November 7–8.
- Mine Run Campaign November 26-December 2. — Attached to Morehead 3rd Brigade, Webb's 2nd Division, Warren's II Corps, Meade's Army of the Potomac
- Robertson's Tavern or Locust Grove November 27.

==== 1864 ====
- Morton's Ford February 6–7.
- Picketing Rapidan River until May 1.
- The Overland Campaign May 4 – June 24. — Attached to Webb's 1st Brigade, Gibbon's 2nd Division, Hancock's II Corps, Meade's Army of the Potomac
  - Battle of the Wilderness May 5–7.
  - Laurel Hill May 8.
  - Battle of Spotsylvania Court House, May 8–21.
    - Po River May 10.
    - Assault on the Salient at Spotsylvania Court House May 12.
  - Battle of North Anna River May 23–26
  - Line of the Pamunkey May 26–28.
  - Battle of Totopotomoy Creek May 28–31.
  - Battle of Cold Harbor June 1–12. — Attached to McKeen's/Haskell's/Pierce's (Note: Assigned June 4, 1864) 1st Brigade, Gibbon's 2nd Division, Hancock's II Corps, Meade's Army of the Potomac
  - Before Petersburg June 16–18.
  - Siege of Petersburg June 16-July 12. — Attached to Pierce's 1st Brigade, Gibbon's 2nd Division, Hancock's/Birney's II Corps, Meade's Army of the Potomac
  - Battle of Jerusalem Plank Road June 22–23.
- Demonstration north of the James River July 27–29.
- Battle of Deep Bottom July 27–28.
- Strawberry Plains, Deep Bottom, August 14–18.
- Ream's Station August 25.

=== Casualties ===
The company lost a total of 39 men during service; 3 officers and 21 enlisted men killed or mortally wounded, 15 enlisted men due to disease.

=== Commanders ===
- Captain John Saunders - killed in action at the Battle of Antietam
- Captain William Plumer

== Armament ==
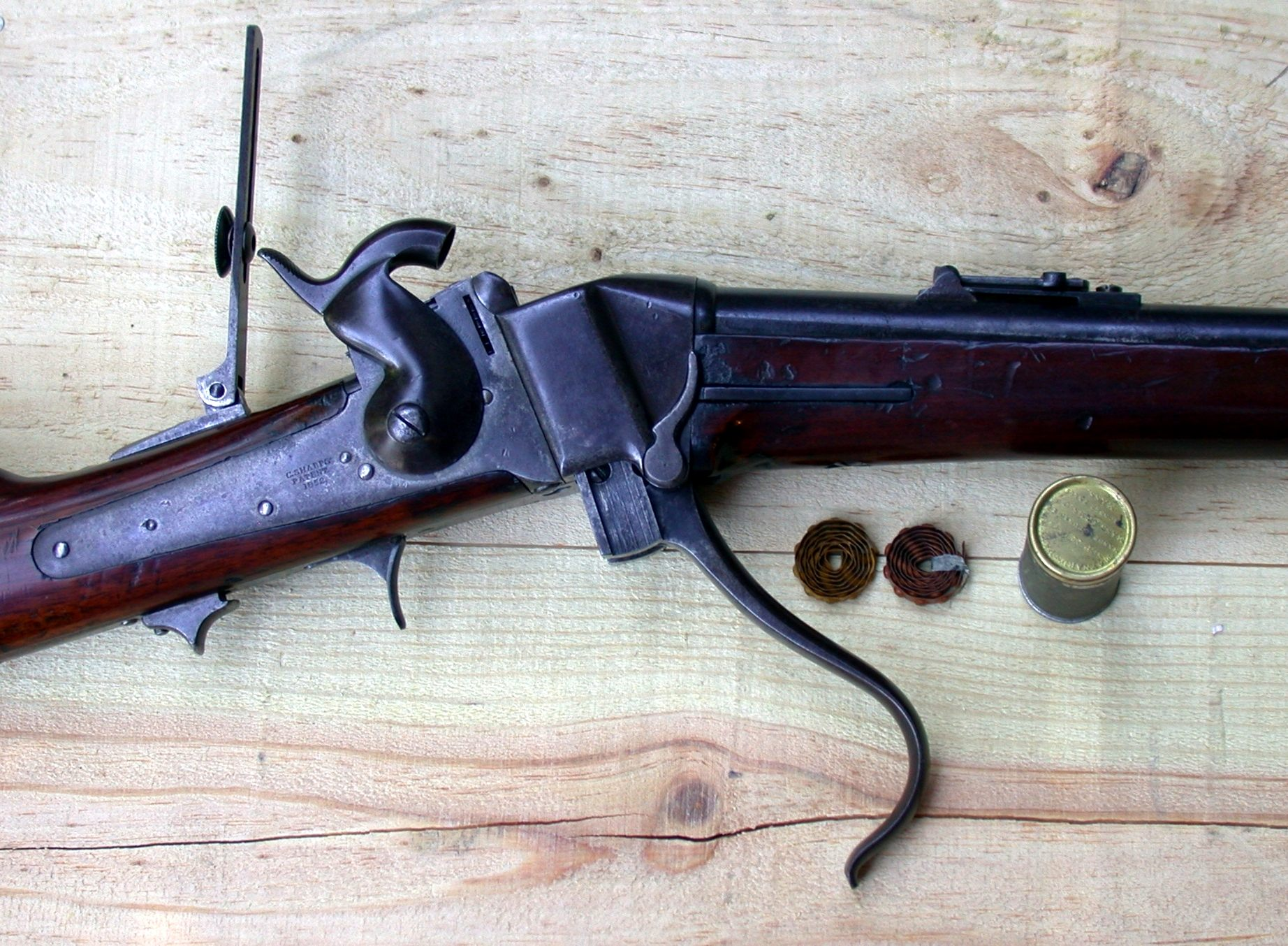
Sharps Model 1852 "Slanting Breech" Carbine, open for loading, two primer-tapes

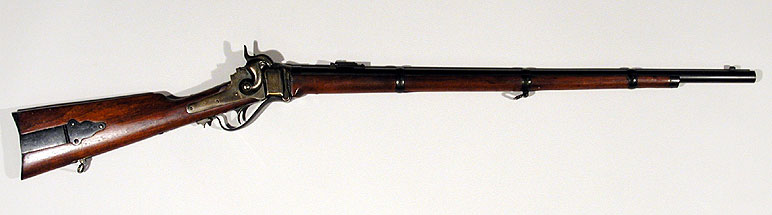
Sharps rifle in .50-70 Government.

Throughout their service, the company was armed with custom, muzzle-loading target rifles equipped with telescopic sights running the length of the barrel. The larger than average physical size of the unit members proved an asset in carrying these weapons. These target rifles were a mix of heavy bench rifles and lighter out of hand rifles. Hawkins and Morgan James were among the manufacturers of these rifles.

Starting at Antietam, they also carried Sharps rifles in the field firing over the iron sights. The Sharps Rifle was produced by the Sharps Rifle Manufacturing Company in Hartford, Connecticut. The Sharps made a superior sniper weapon of greater accuracy than the more commonly issued muzzle-loading rifled muskets. This was due mainly to the higher rate of fire of the breech loading mechanism and superior quality of manufacture, as well as the ease of which it could be reloaded from a kneeling or prone position.

== See also ==
- 15th Regiment Massachusetts Volunteer Infantry
- 19th Regiment Massachusetts Volunteer Infantry
- 20th Regiment Massachusetts Volunteer Infantry
- List of Massachusetts Civil War units
- Massachusetts in the American Civil War

== Notes/References ==
Footnotes

Citations

References

- Civilwarhome - Gettysburg Union order of battle
- Civil War Trust - Gettysburg Union order of battle
- Coates, Earl J.; Dean, Thomas S. (1990). An Introduction to Civil War small arms. Gettysburg, PA: Thomas Publications. ISBN 0-939631-25-3. OCLC 755158350.
- de la Roche, Roberta Senechal (2016). "Our Aim was Man": Andrew's Sharpshooters in the American Civil War. Amherst: University of Massachusetts Press. ISBN 978-1-62534-248-5. OCLC 1012309482.
- Dyer, Frederick Henry (1908). A Compendium of the War of the Rebellion (PDF). Des Moines, IA: Dyer Pub. Co. pp. 25, 157, 337, 1247. ASIN B01BUFJ76Q. LCCN 09005239. OCLC 8697590. This article incorporates text from this source, which is in the public domain.
- Eicher, John Harold (December 18, 2002). "Eicher's Ultimate Gettysburg Order of Battle". Gettysburg Discussion Group. Archived from the original on September 27, 2011.
- Ellis, Alden C. Jr. (2012). The Massachusetts Andrew Sharpshooters: A Civil War History and Roster. Jefferson: McFarland & Company, Inc. ISBN 978-0-7864-6489-0. OCLC 817056582.
- Flatnes, Oyvind (2013). From Musket to Metallic Cartridge: A Practical History of Black Powder Firearms. Ramsbury, UK: The Crowood Press. ISBN 978-1-84797-594-2. OCLC 858312818.
- Marcot, Roy M.; Marron, Edward W.; Paxton, Ron; Carter, David (2019). Sharps Firearms. Volume I: The Percussion Era. Sharps Firearms. Tucson, Arizona: Northwood Heritage Press. ISBN 978-0-9787769-9-2. OCLC 1099575324.
- Sellers, Frank M. (1978). Sharps firearms. North Hollywood, CA: Beinfeld Pub. ISBN 978-0-917714-12-2. OCLC 4037315.
- Smith, Winston O. (1943). The Sharps Rifle: Its History, Development and Operation (1965 ed.). New York, NY: William Morrow and Company.
- U.S. War Department (1889). Operations in North Carolina, Virginia, West Virginia, Maryland, Pennsylvania, and Department of the East. June 3-August 3, 1863., Part I - Reports. The War of the Rebellion: A Compilation of the Official Records of the Union and Confederate Armies. Vol. XXVII-XXXIX-I. Washington, DC: U.S. Government Printing Office. pp. 155–168. hdl:2027/coo.31924077699761. OCLC 857196196. This article incorporates text from this source, which is in the public domain.
- U.S. War Department (1889). Operations in North Carolina, Virginia, West Virginia, Maryland, Pennsylvania, and Department of the East. June 3-August 3, 1863., Part III - Correspondence, etc. The War of the Rebellion: A Compilation of the Official Records of the Union and Confederate Armies. Vol. XXVII-XXXIX-III. Washington, DC: U.S. Government Printing Office. pp. 53–55, 461. hdl:2027/coo.31924077700262. OCLC 857196196. This article incorporates text from this source, which is in the public domain.
- Wieland, Terry (2011). Gun Digest Book of Classic American Combat Rifles. Iola, Wisconsin: Krause Publications. p. 188. ISBN 978-1-4402-3017-2.
- Elmore, Tom (March 28, 2018). "First Company Massachusetts "Andrew Sharpshooters" at Gettysburg - Gettysburg". American Civil War Forums.
- "Union Order of Battle". Gettysburg. February 14, 2005. Archived from the original on September 11, 2019.
- "The Army of the Potomac at Gettysburg". Gettysburg National Military Park. U.S. National Park Service. December 20, 2022.

Further Reading

- Bowen, James L (1889). Massachusetts in the War 1861–1865 (PDF) (1st ed.). Springfield, MA: Clark W. Bryan & Co. pp. 862–865. LCCN 02014318. OCLC 1986476.
- Federal Publishing Company (1908). Military Affairs and Regimental Histories of Maine, New Hampshire, Vermont, Massachusetts, Rhode Island, Connecticut, Pennsylvania, And Delaware (PDF). The Union Army: A History of Military Affairs in the Loyal States, 1861–65 – Records of the Regiments in the Union army – Cyclopedia of battles – Memoirs of Commanders and Soldiers. Vol. I. Madison, WI: Federal Publishing Company. p. 176. OCLC 694018100.
- Hall, Charles Winslow (1900a). Regiments and Armories of Massachusetts. An historical narration of the Massachusetts Volunteer Militia. With portraits and biographies of Officers, past and present, etc (PDF). Vol. I. Boston: W.H. Potter & Co. OCLC 559765857.
- Hall, Charles Winslow (1900b). Regiments and Armories of Massachusetts. An historical narration of the Massachusetts Volunteer Militia. With portraits and biographies of Officers, past and present, etc (PDF). Vol. II. Boston: W.H. Potter & Co. OCLC 559765857.
- Headley, Phineas Camp (1866). Massachusetts in the Rebellion: a Record of the Historical Position of the Commonwealth, and the Services of the Leading Statesmen, the Military, the Colleges, and the People, in the Civil War of 1861–65 (PDF). Boston, MA: Walker, Fuller & Co. pp. 266–268. OCLC 8406829.
- Higginson, Thomas Wentworth (State Historian (1896). Massachusetts in the Army and Navy During the War of 1861–65 (PDF). Vol. I. Boston, MA: Wright and Potter Printing Co, State Printers. pp. 34, 50–55, 72–79, 92–103, 115–130, 137, 147–151, 230–231, 565–569. OCLC 1049652105.
- Higginson, Thomas Wentworth (State Historian (1895). Massachusetts in the Army and Navy During the War of 1861–65 (PDF). Vol. II. Boston, MA: Wright and Potter Printing Co, State Printers. pp. 176, 183–184, 226, 235. LCCN 02014316. OCLC 1049652105.
- Johnson, Robert Underwood; Buel, Clarence Clough (1887). Robert Underwood Johnson; Clarence Clough Buel (eds.). The Opening Battles. Battles and Leaders of the Civil War: Being for the Most Part Contributions by Union and Confederate officers: Based upon "The Century War Series". Vol. I. New York City: The Century Company. p. 784. OCLC 48764702.
- Johnson, Robert Underwood; Buel, Clarence Clough (1887). Robert Underwood Johnson; Clarence Clough Buel (eds.). The Struggle Intensifies. Battles and Leaders of the Civil War: Being for the Most Part Contributions by Union and Confederate officers: Based upon "The Century War Series". Vol. II. New York City: The Century Company. p. 786. OCLC 48764702.
- Johnson, Robert Underwood; Buel, Clarence Clough (1887). Robert Underwood Johnson; Clarence Clough Buel (eds.). The Tide Shifts. Battles and Leaders of the Civil War: Being for the Most Part Contributions by Union and Confederate officers: Based upon "The Century War Series". Vol. III. New York City: The Century Company. p. 778. OCLC 48764702.
- Johnson, Robert Underwood; Buel, Clarence Clough (1887). Robert Underwood Johnson; Clarence Clough Buel (eds.). Retreat with Honor. Battles and Leaders of the Civil War: Being for the Most Part Contributions by Union and Confederate officers: Based upon "The Century War Series". Vol. IV. New York City: The Century Company. p. 778. OCLC 48764702.
- Stevens, Jesse F (1931). Massachusetts Soldiers, Sailors, and Marines in the Civil War (PDF). Massachusetts Soldiers, Sailors, and Marines in the Civil War in Eight Volumes. Vol. 2 (1st ed.). Norwood, MA: Norwood Press. pp. 205–213. LCCN 31027863. OCLC 11485612.
