= The Strangling of Persia =

Book by William Morgan Shuster

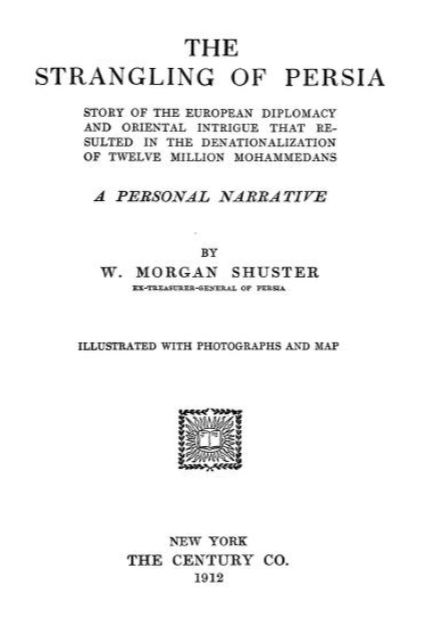
- Title page for The Strangling of Persia (1912)
- Author: William Morgan Shuster
- Language: English
- Subject: Eastern Question (Central Asia) - Iran's History - Politics and Government
- Genre: Autobiography
- Publisher: New York, The Century Co., 1912.
- Publication date: 2006
- Publication place: United Estates
- English publication date: 1912
- Pages: 492
- ISBN: 978-1933823065

The Strangling of Persia is a book written by William Morgan Shuster. Shuster was an American lawyer, civil servant, and publisher, who is best known as the treasurer-general of Persia by appointment of the Iranian parliament, from May to December 1911. In 1911, the Iranian government hired Morgan Shuster to modernize the economy and manage Iran's treasury. Nine months after Shuster's presence in Iran, British and Russian pressure on the Iranian government caused Shuster's dismissal. The British and Russian governments believed that Shuster's presence in Iran would endanger the interests of these countries in Iran.

After returning to the United States, Shuster wrote the book The Strangling of Persia. This book is a recount of the details of these events, and criticizes Britain and Russian influence in Iran.

== The Content of the Book ==
Shuster returned to the United States and wrote a scathing indictment of Russian and British influence in Persia, titled The Strangling of Persia. In one well-known passage of that book, Shuster decried the influence of the Great Powers:

It was obvious that the people of Persia deserve much better than what they are getting, that they wanted us to succeed, but it was the British and the Russians who were determined not to let us succeed.

The Strangling of Persia, which has been dedicated to "The Persian People", was originally published in New York by the Century Company in 1912, then reprinted by the Greenwood Press in 1968 and Mage Publishers in 1987 and 2005. The book was subtitled, the story of the European diplomacy and oriental intrigue that resulted in the denationalization of twelve million Mohammedans, a personal narrative. The dedication of the book reads thus:

TO THE PERSIAN PEOPLE In the endeavour to repay in some slight measure the debt of gratitude imposed on me through their confidence in my purposes towards them and by their unwavering belief, under difficult and forbidding circumstances, in my desire to serve them for the regeneration of their nation, this book is dedicated by the author.

Shuster's book has been praised as an invaluable eyewitness account of a period of Iranian history where foreign influence had a negative effect on the Iranian economy. The central theme is the tenacity with which he applies himself to the task of creating a viable administrative apparatus to collect taxes, the sine qua non of creating a nationalist government capable of resisting foreign powers. For this very reason, Shuster and his administrative assistants were the direct targets of the Russian invasion of the country in 1911-1912: Shuster's removal from his position at the Treasury was a principal objective of Russian foreign policy. The details of the struggle for power in Tehran are written in a robust, straightforward style.

Chapter XI of the Strangling of Persia provides a detailed appraisal of the state of tax collection in Persia, from payment-in-kind to tax farming. The interaction between foreign policy and taxation is particularly well done: rural landowners who didn't like paying their taxes were all too willing to ally with the Russian invaders.

== Translations ==
This book has also been translated and published in the Persian language.
