= Alexander Wilson Drake =

American artist, collector and critic

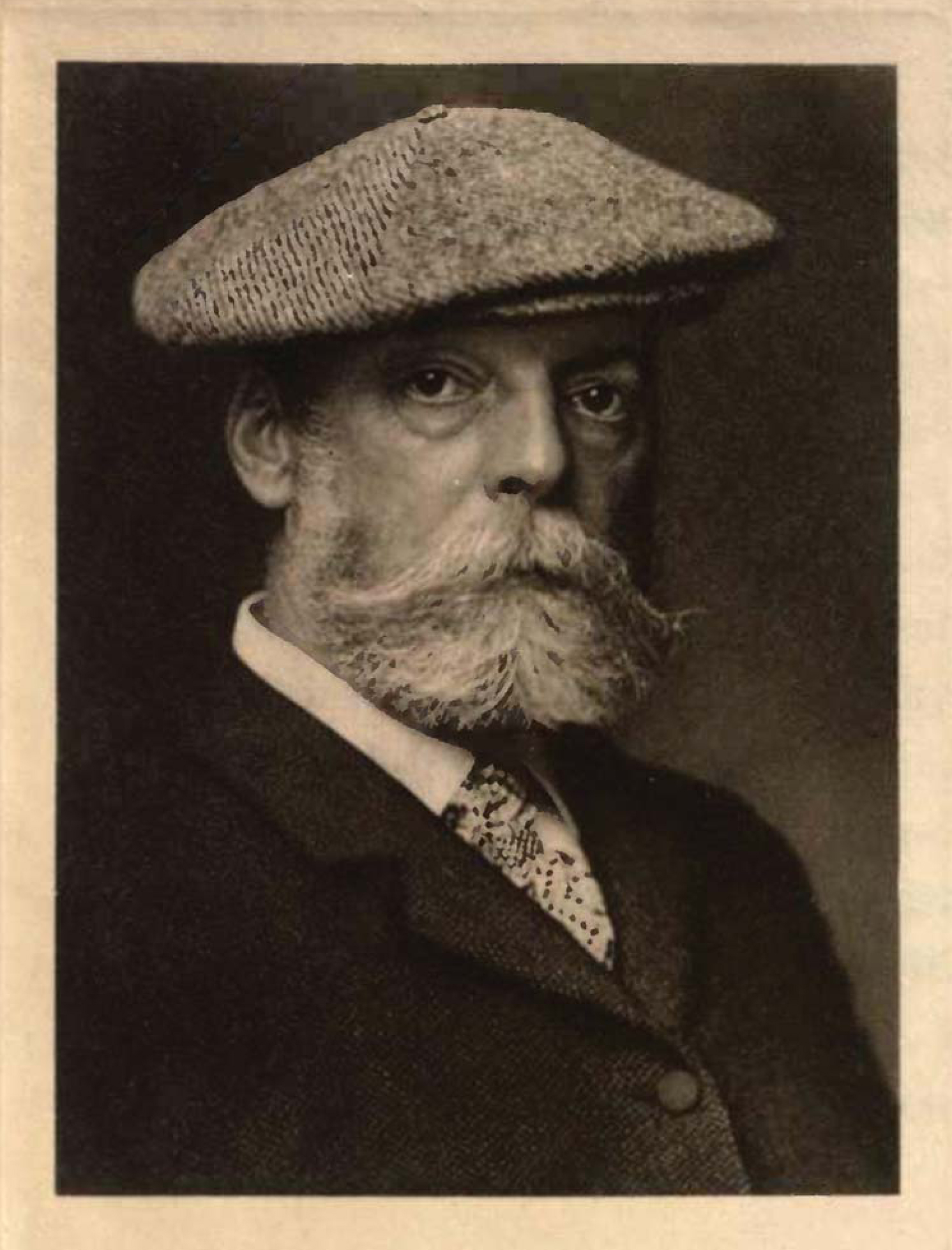
- Born: 1843; Westfield, New Jersey, U.S.
- Died: February 4, 1916 (aged 72–73); New York City, U.S.
- Occupations: artist and writer

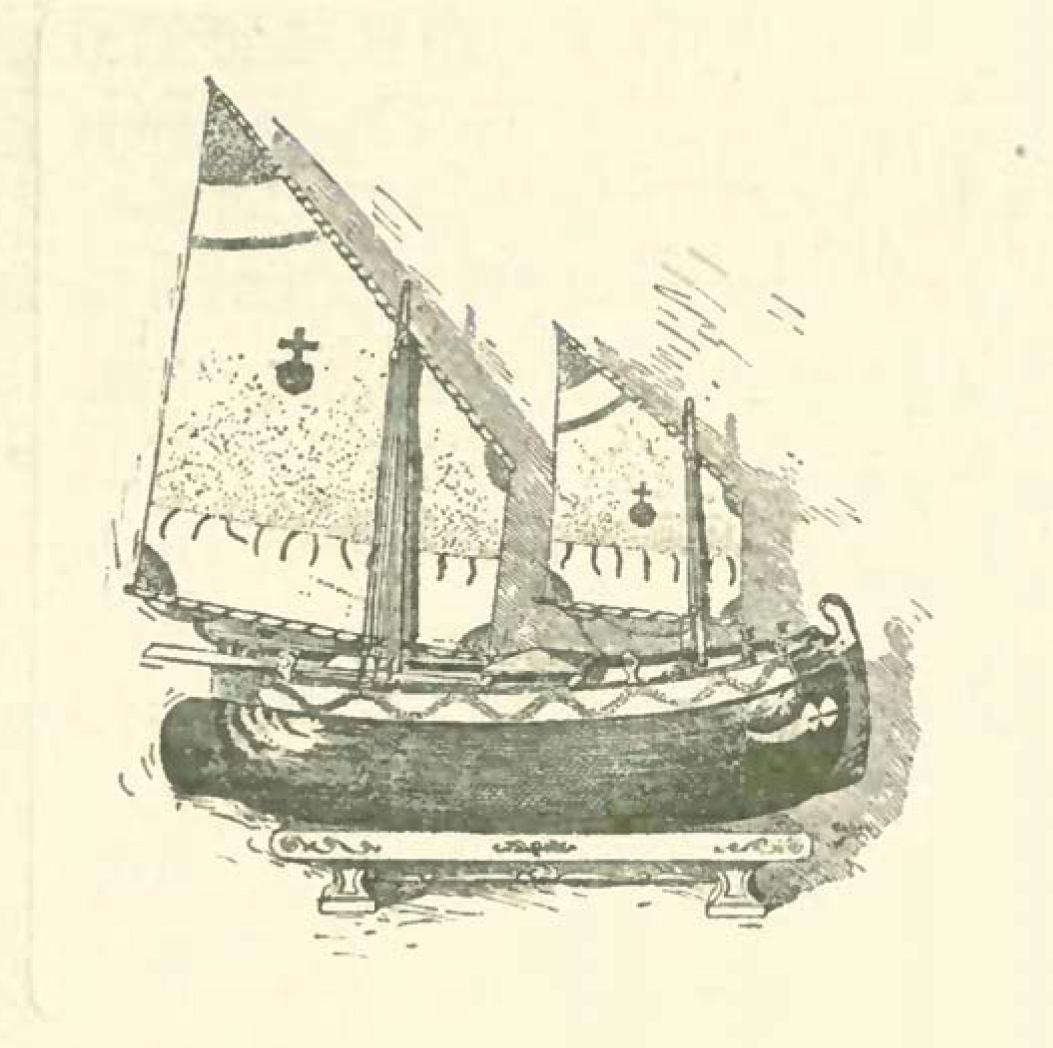
An engraving from The Century Magazine, Alexander Wilson Drake

Alexander Wilson Drake (1843–1916) was an American artist, collector and critic.

== Biography ==
Drake was born near Westfield, New Jersey. He studied wood engraving under John W. Orr of New York city, as well as oil and water-color painting. He was in the wood engraving business on his own account in New York city from 1865 to 1870. From 1870 to 1881 he was director of the art department of Scribner's Magazine, and thereafter he held a similar position on the Century and St. Nicholas. In this capacity he did much to aid the development of the new school of wood engraving in America. He organized the Bartholdi loan association which raised the money to build the pedestal for the Statue of Liberty in New York harbor. He was also identified with other important art movements in the United States. He was one of the nine men who founded the Grolier Club in New York City, and was elected a member of the Century Association, the Players Club, the Architectural league, the Municipal art league of New York, and the Caxton club of Chicago, Ill.

Frank Weitenkampf recounts the following anecdote of Drake and Richard Watson Gilder:

Drake and some friends, late one Christmas Eve (or was it Thanksgiving?), wandering down the Bowery, came across a turkey raffle. They took chances, and won the bird, a large, live specimen. What to do with it? One of the party had a happy idea. Off they marched to Gilder's house, rang up the butler, and persuaded him to let them tie the bird to a large chair in the front room. Drake continued the story to the effect that Gilder early next morning was aroused by a terrific racket, rushed downstairs, and found the children hilariously dancing around the turkey, whose excited gobbling added to the din.

He was first married to Hilah Tanner Lloyd (1847–1885) and then to Anne Lyde.

Drake died at New York City in 1916.

== Three Midnight Stories ==
In addition to his engraving, he was known as both a writer and an art collector. Several short stories and poems were brought together in 1916 in what are called the Three Midnight Stories. They are interspersed with his engravings as well as photographic prints of his residence and art collection, and produced as a memorial by The Century Company. His tribute poem written for Ignacy Jan Paderewski was included. A print run of 500 hand-numbered copies was produced in 1916 and distributed to family and friends. The work also included tributes from notable people of the Age, including a biographical account written by William Fayal Clarke of Century Magazine. "To a public that knew little of his charming personality and influential labors in the interest of art Mr. Drake was known chiefly as a collector. In that field he was distinctly a creator, for he awakened the perception that objects of common use often enshrine the basic lineaments of beauty". Pallbearers at his funeral included Walter Leighton Clark, Charles Dana Gibson and Robert Underwood Johnson, among others.

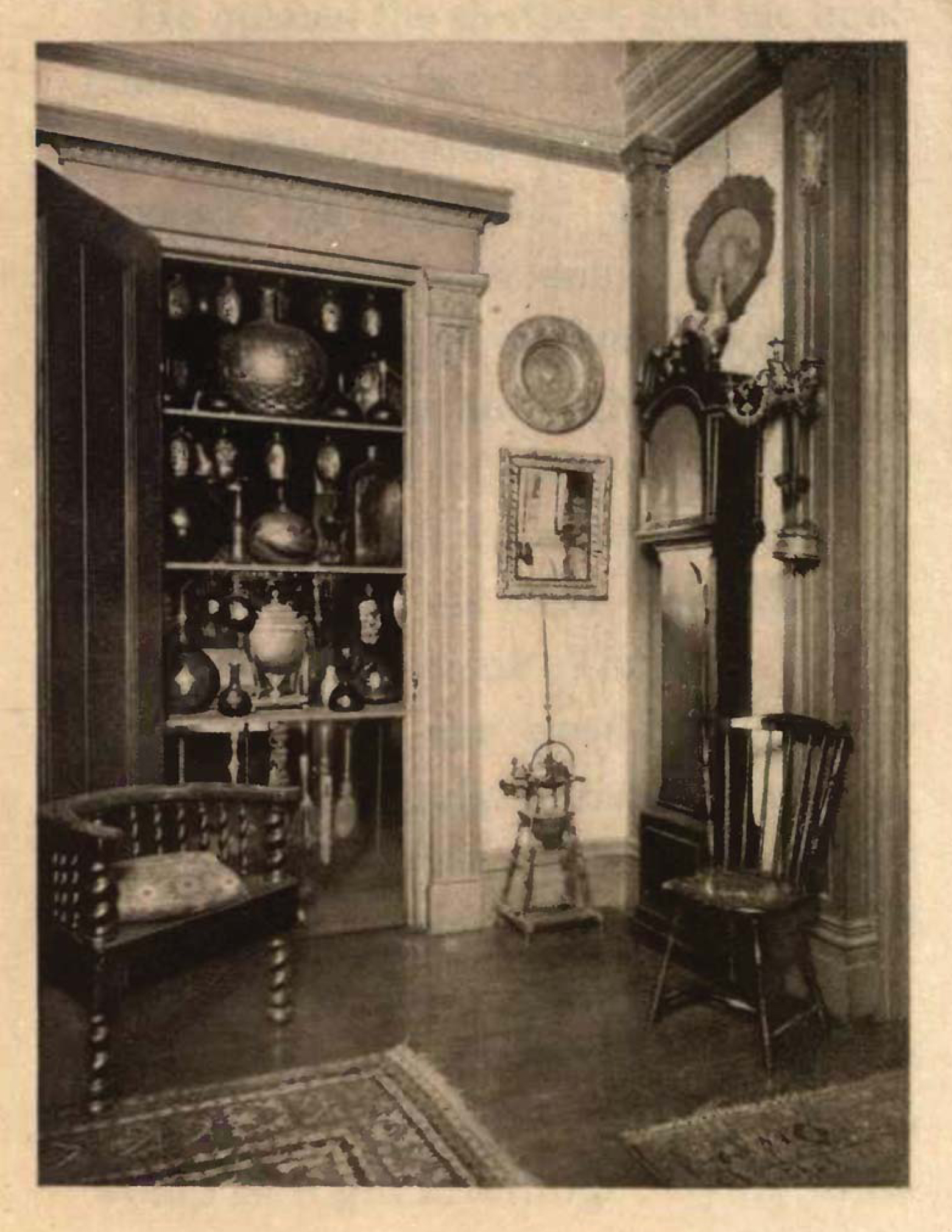
A Bottle Cabinet in the Residence of A.W. Drake, Alexander Wilson Drake

== Drake Art Collection ==
A hint of his collection skills is given in a printed catalog of the Alexander Wilson Drake Collection, which was sold at public auction in 1913. The collection included "…Antique samplers and needlework, fragments of old printed chintz, bandboxes, wallpaper, glass bottles, pottery, china, pewter, engraved pledge glasses, antique silver cups and ladles, an extraordinary collection of old finger rings, silver, enameled and pearl snuff boxes, patch boxes and vinaigrettes, old paintings and prints."

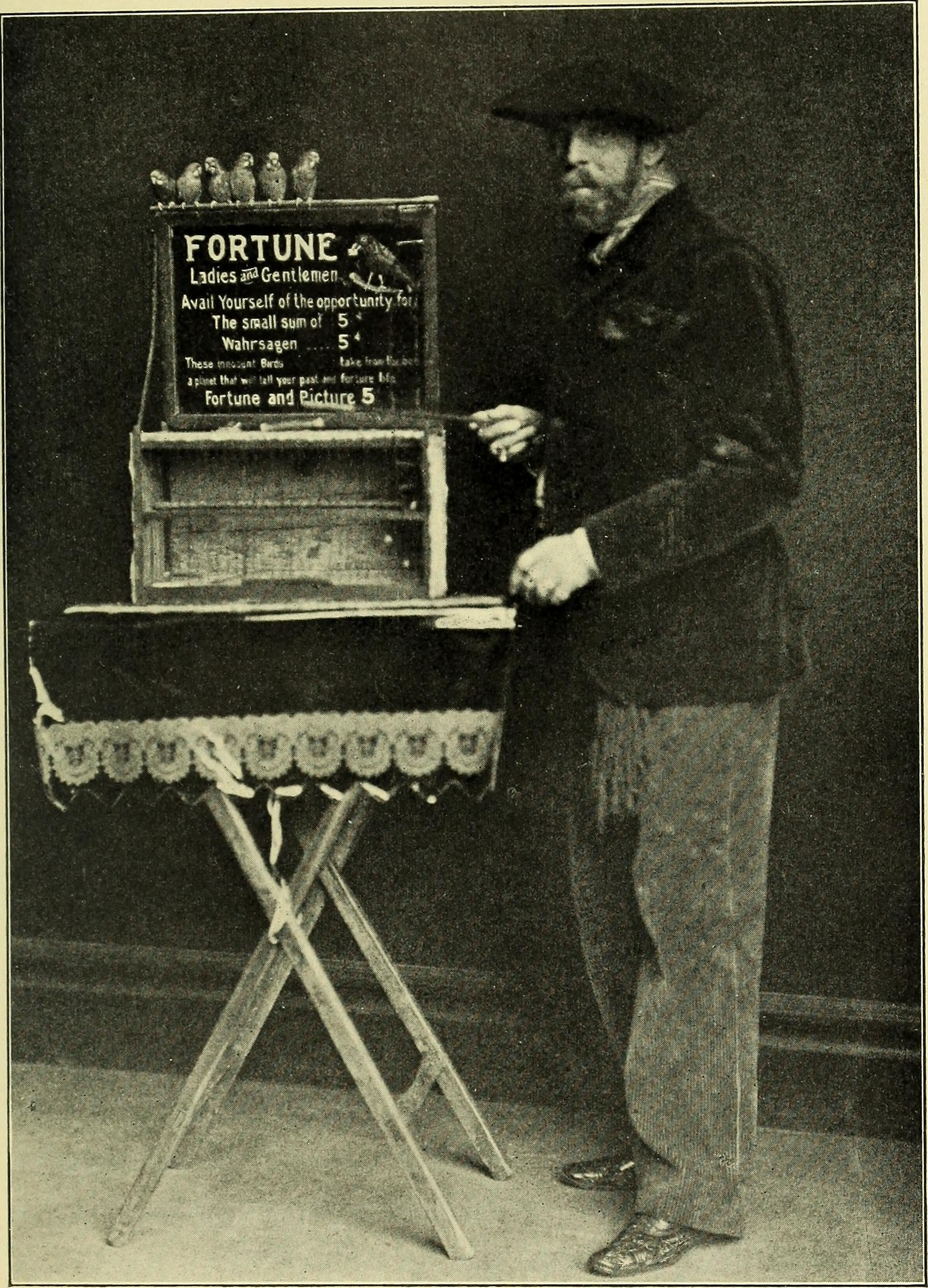
Alexander W. Drake at a Twelfth Night revel of the Century Association, in the guise of an itinerant Italian fortune-teller

Dr. George Frederick Kunz wrote: "The extensive and remarkable collection of the late Alexander Wilson Drake, which was disposed of by the American Art Galleries of New York, March 10th to 17th, 1913, comprised a fine collection of finger rings, illustrating a large variety of forms and periods. There were in all nearly 800 examples, set and unset. There were betrothal rings, memorials rings, gimmal rings, puzzle rings, rings of Roman, French, German, Italian, Spanish, Russian, Irish Scandinavian, English and American workmanship, and many Oriental rings, Sassanian, Indian, Japanese, Chinese, Hebrew, Gypsy and Moorish, one of the later being a gold circlet with the twelve signs of the zodiac engraved in high relief around it. The personality of the collector added greatly to the charm of this collection for all who had known him. As art editor of Century Magazine, and in a thousand other ways, no one had labored more enthusiastically and successfully in the cause of art encouragement and art education, and his death constituted a real loss for the progress of art in America…"

At this time of the auction in 1913, Dr. Kunz was still writing his famous book, Rings for the Finger, which came out a few years later in 1917, and perhaps he was also using the Drake Collection then being sold to estimate the value and interest of ancient rings among the public. One example is Lot #1795 "Massive Gold Parthian Finger Ring. Of the third or fourth century A. D. Found in the ruins of Ctesiphon. Heavy six-sided shield with pierced, interlaced and chiseled ornamentation. Figure of a man with upraised arms supporting shield at either side. Entire hoop ornamented. One of the finest specimens in the collection." Opposite it is the price in 1916 dollars: $170.00!

In the George Frederick Kunz Collection of the US Geological Survey Library, is some correspondence and notes about the Drake Collection. Attached to the copy of the auction catalog are newspaper accounts of the funeral of Alexander W. Drake, of which Dr. Kunz was one of the pallbearers. Also included is a "mourning letter" with black borders around the stationery, written by Mrs. Drake, thanking Dr. Kunz for his many years of friendship with Alexander W. Drake, who had been Kunz' editor at the Century Magazine and other publications. He also mentions in his book, Rings for the Finger, that Mrs. Edith T. Drake had given him a copy made in silver of the famous 1525 wedding ring of Martin Luther to Katharina von Bora, and the ring is also used as an illustration in his book.
