= The Bookkeeper's Wife =

1916 short story by Willa Cather

- Short story by Willa Cather

Text available at Wikisource
- Country: United States
- Language: English

Publication
- Published in: Century
- Publication type: Illustrated monthly magazine
- Publisher: The Century Company
- Publication date: May 1916

"The Bookkeeper's Wife" is a short story by Willa Cather. It was first published in Century in May 1916.

== Plot summary ==
Percy Bixby, a bookkeeper, steals money from his company to pretend he earns $50 a week and seduce Stella Brown. Once, he visits her and they talk about their honeymoon; she seems pleased. She will marry him instead of Charles Gaygreen, who is wealthier.

Later, the new boss at his company notices Percy doesn't take holidays, and shies away from him. Percy ends up admitting he stole money before getting married. Back home, his wife wants to go to the theatre and he explains what has happened. She says she will take up work in Charles Greengay's company and stay with the Burks. Finally, Percy has moved into a boarding house and tells his boss he can pay him less for the debt to be paid back more quickly, as he doesn't need as much money any more.

== Characters ==
- Percy Bixby, a bookkeeper.
- Stella Brown
- Mrs Brown, Stella's mother.
- Charles Greengay, a businessman.
- Oliver Remsey, Junior, Percy's new boss.
- Mrs Remsey, Oliver Remsey Junior's mother.
- Mr Melton, a lawyer.
- The Burks, friends of Stella's.

== Major themes ==
- Marriage

== References to other works ==
- Percy is said to be reading James Bryce's The American Commonwealth.

== Literary significance and criticism ==
It has been noted that the story was influenced by John Bunyan's Pilgrim's Progress.

The story has been singled out for portraying a "new woman", that is one who is financially independent.

Other critics have dismissed it as it was only written by Cather to earn money.
