= William Morgan Shuster =

American lawyer

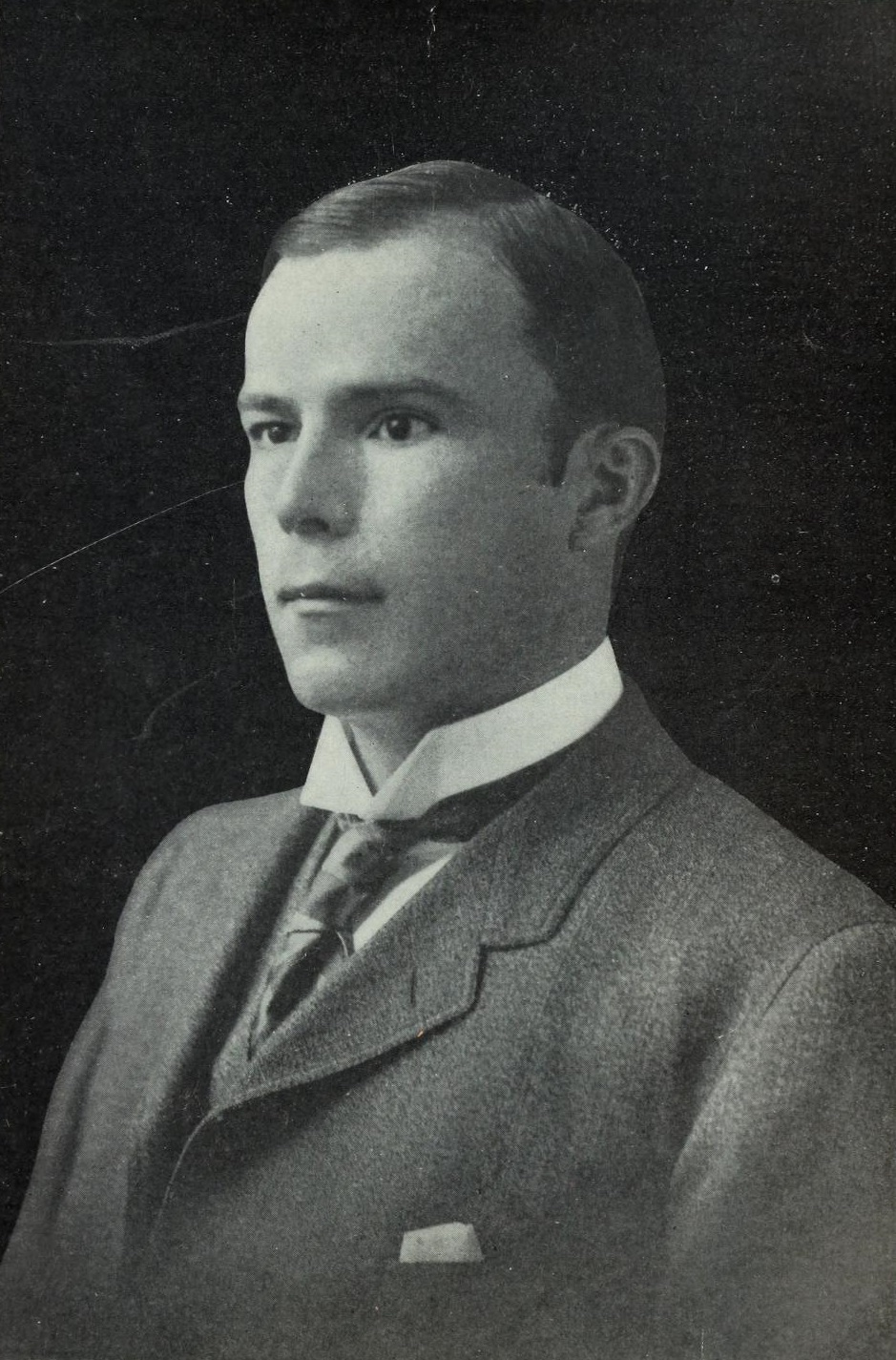
- William Morgan Shuster

Treasurer-General of Persia
- In office May 1911 – December 1911

6th Philippine Secretary of Public Instruction
- In office September 28, 1906 – March 1, 1909
- Appointed by: James Francis Smith
- Preceded by: James Francis Smith
- Succeeded by: Newton W. Gilbert

Personal details
- Born: February 23, 1877 Washington, D.C.
- Died: May 26, 1960 (aged 83) New York City, New York
- Spouse(s): Pearl Berthe Trigg (died 1942) Katherine Kane (died 1960)
- Parent(s): Williams Shuster II; Caroline von Tagen
- Education: Columbian University; Columbian Law School

William Morgan Shuster III (February 23, 1877 – May 26, 1960), was an American lawyer, civil servant, and publisher, who is best known as the Treasurer-General of Persia by appointment of the Iranian parliament, or Majles, from May to December 1911.

== Early life ==
Shuster was born in Washington, D.C. on February 23, 1877. He was the only son of William Shuster Jr. (1846–1921) and Caroline (née von Tagen) Shuster, who was from Philadelphia. His father was a prominent Washington attorney. His paternal grandfather, William Morgan Shuster, owned a dry goods store on Pennsylvania Avenue in Washington. He was educated at George Washington University and the university's Law School.

== Career ==
After graduation, Shuster became a customs collector for the U.S. government, serving in the United States Military Government in Cuba in 1899 following the Spanish–American War, and in the Philippines, which was at that time an American colony. In 1906, he was appointed Secretary of Public Instruction in the Insular Government of the Philippine Islands and a member of the Philippine Commission.

=== Time in Iran ===
In 1906, the Constitutional Revolution of Iran sought to establish a Western-oriented, democratic civil society in Iran, then known as Persia to the outside world. The movement forced Mozaffar ad-Din Shah to agree to the election of the first Majlis, the opening up of a relatively free press, and a number of other reforms.

After being recommended by the U.S. government to the Iranian minister in Washington, Shuster was appointed by the 2nd Majlis to help manage the country's financial position. Persia was on shaky financial footing at the time due to heavy debts accumulated by the Qajars, the Iranian royal family, to Great Britain and Imperial Russia. Great Britain and Russia had previously divided Iran into two spheres of influence pursuant to the Anglo-Russian Convention of 1907.

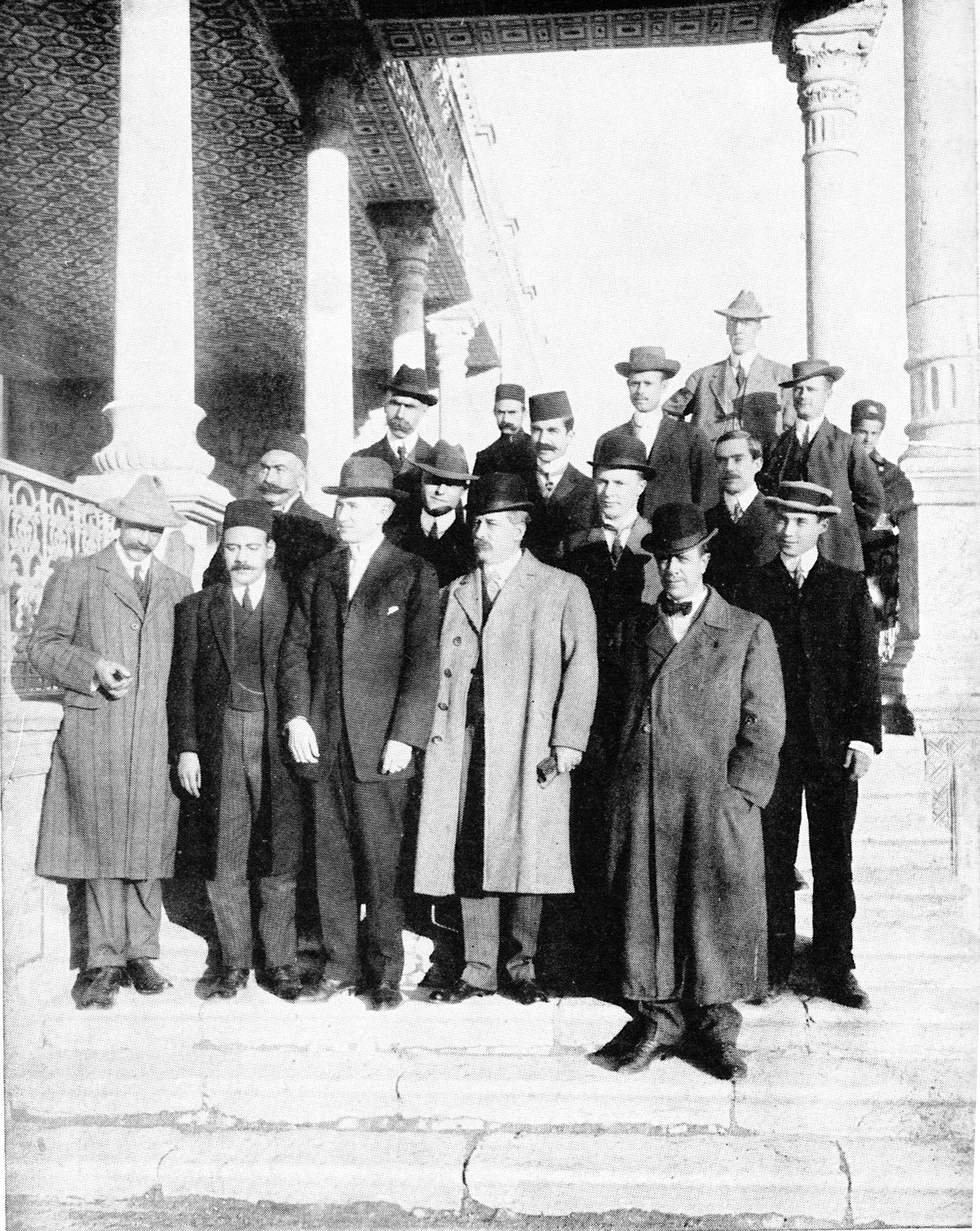
Morgan Shuster and American officials at Atabak Palace, Tehran, 1911.

Shuster became active in supporting the Constitutional revolution of Persia financially. When Iran's government ordered Shu'a al-Saltaneh (شعاع السلطنه), the Shah's brother, who was aligned with the goals of the Russian Empire in Iran, to surrender his assets to the government, Shuster was assigned this task, which he promptly moved to execute. Imperial Russia immediately landed troops in Bandar Anzali demanding a recourse and apology from the Iranian government.

The hiring of Shuster and his American associates as financial advisors concerned the imperial powers, who sought to keep Iran from independent influences and dampen national feeling. Prior to Shuster's hiring the Iranian central government was weak, and Shuster oversaw the creation of a 12,000-member gendarmerie to collect taxes. The Imperial Russian Army, which had occupied large parts of northern Iran, claimed that Shuster had violated the 1907 Anglo-Russian Convention by sending Iranian gendarmes into Russian-occupied territory and arresting Russian citizens.

Under Russian and British diplomatic pressure, the vice-regent of Iran expelled Shuster from office in December 1911 against the will of the Iranian parliament. Shortly thereafter, due to the chaotic political climate created by Shuster's ouster, the deposed Shah, Mohammad Ali Shah Qajar attempted an invasion of Iran from Russia.

The Majlis approved (Shuster's) financial powers. Shortly after his arrival the Russian government demanded his expulsion, and when the Majlis refused to do so, Russia occupied northern parts of Iran. The Majlis was suspended, and no budget law was prepared for a number of years.

Hence eventually the American Morgan Shuster was forced to resign under British and Russian diplomatic pressure. Shuster's book "The Strangling of Persia" is a recount of the details of these events, and criticizes Britain and Russian influence in Iran.

=== The Strangling of Persia ===
Shuster returned to the United States and wrote a scathing indictment of Russian and British influence in Iran, titled The Strangling of Persia. In one well-known passage of that book, Shuster decried the influence of the Great Powers:

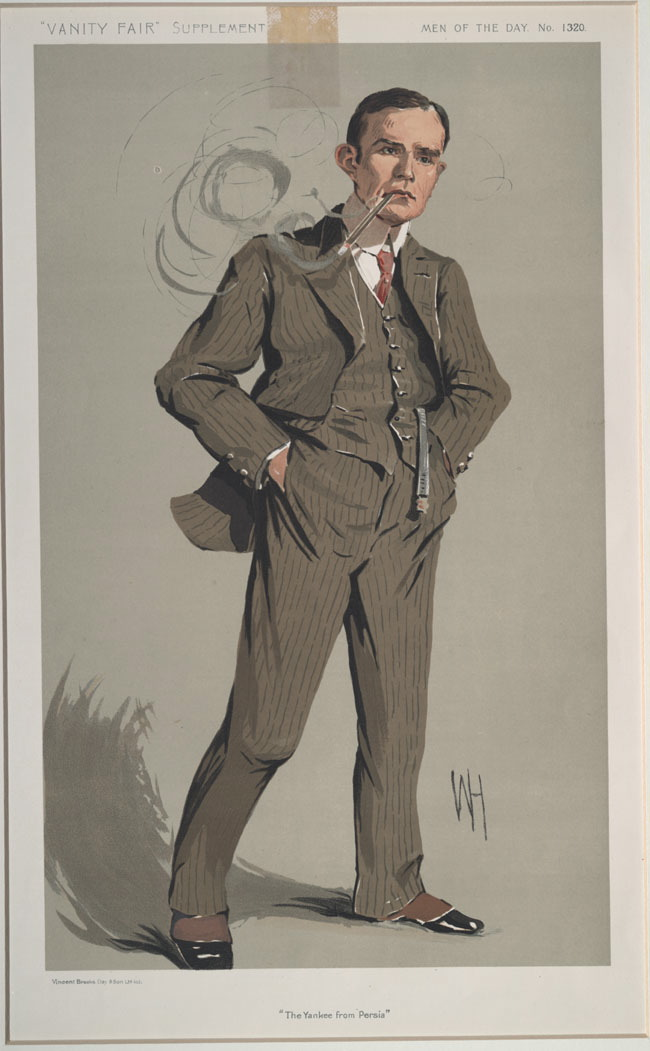
Shuster caricatured by WH for Vanity Fair, 1912

[I]t was obvious that the people of Persia deserve much better than what they are getting, that they wanted us to succeed, but it was the British and the Russians who were determined not to let us succeed.

The Strangling of Persia, which has been dedicated to "The Persian People", was originally published in New York by the Century Company in 1912, then reprinted by the Greenwood Press in 1968 and Mage Publishers in 1987 and 2005. The book was subtitled, the story of the European diplomacy and oriental intrigue that resulted in the denationalization of twelve million Mohammedans, a personal narrative. The dedication of the book reads thus:

TO THE PERSIAN PEOPLE
In the endeavour to repay in some slight measure the debt of gratitude imposed on me through their confidence in my purposes towards them and by their unwavering belief, under difficult and forbidding circumstances, in my desire to serve them for the regeneration of their nation, this book is dedicated by the author.

The book's motto is:

Time with whose passage certain pains abate
But sharpens those of Persia's unjust fate.

Shuster's book has been praised as an invaluable eyewitness account of a period of Iranian history where foreign influence had a negative effect on the Iranian economy. The central theme is the tenacity with which he applies himself to the task of creating a viable administrative apparatus to collect taxes, the sine qua non of creating a nationalist government capable of resisting foreign powers. For this very reason, Shuster and his administrative assistants were the direct targets of the Russian invasion of the country in 1911-1912: Shuster's removal from his position at the Treasury was a principal objective of Russian foreign policy. The details of the struggle for power in Tehran are written in a robust, straightforward style.

Chapter XI of the Strangling of Persia provides a detailed appraisal of the state of tax collection in Iran, from payment-in-kind to tax farming. The interaction between foreign policy and taxation is particularly well done: rural landowners who didn't like paying their taxes were all too willing to ally with the Russian invaders.

This book has also been translated and published in Persian language.

=== Later life ===
Shuster entered publishing in 1915 upon his return to the U.S. and became president of Century Publishing in New York. He led the firm, which had been established in 1870, through a merger with D. Appleton & Company in 1933, and F. S. Crofts Co in 1947. He became chairman in 1952. By his death in 1960 the firm was known as Appleton-Century-Crofts.

== Personal life ==
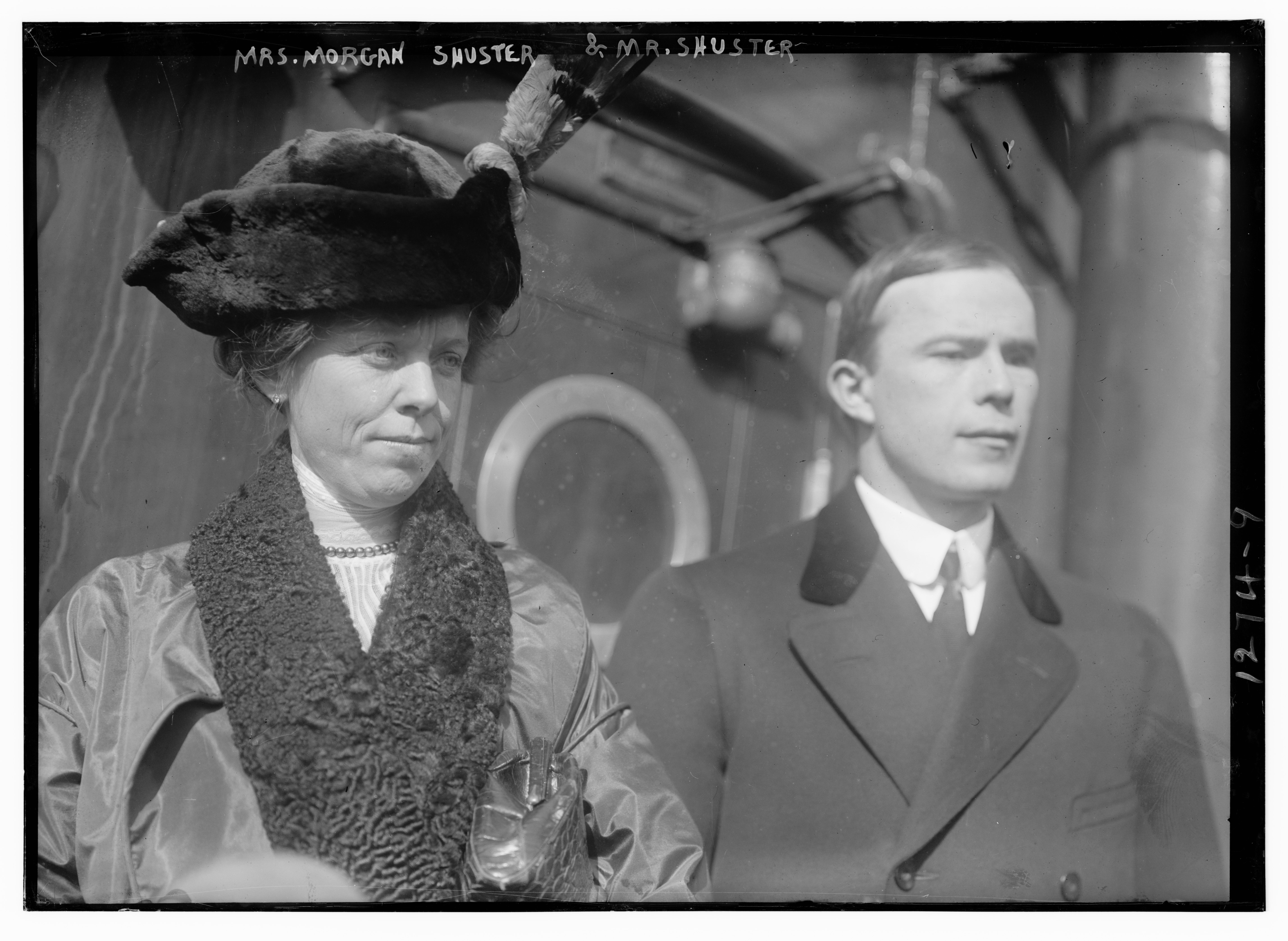
Shuster and his wife, c. 1900.

Shuster was married to Pearl Berthe Trigg (1878–1942), a daughter of Col. Haiden Curd Trigg and Anne (née Ballard) Trigg (a daughter of slave trader Rice C. Ballard) of Glasgow, Kentucky. Together, they were the parents of:

- Caroline Shuster (1905–2010), who made front-page news in The New York Times by attempting to elope, at age 17, with William Redding Morris, then 18. Though the elopement was at first foiled, the couple married a short while later over Shuster's objections in 1923. They later divorced and she married Rear Admiral Leon Jackson Manees in 1934.
- Litie McElroy Shuster (b. 1907), who married Italian Count Giulio Cacciaguerra-Ranghieri in 1925.

After his first wife died in 1942, he married Katherine Kane. They lived at 65 Awixa Avenue in Bay Shore, New York on Long Island.

Shuster died at Doctors Hospital in New York City on May 26, 1960. His widow, Katherine, gave his papers to the Library of Congress in 1965 and 1975, and by his granddaughter, the Italian poet Perla Cacciaguerra, in 1999.

== In popular culture ==
Chapters XLV, XLVI and XLVII of the historical fiction novel Samarkand, written by French-Lebanese writer Amin Maalouf, revolve around Shuster and the Constitutional Revolution of Iran.

== See also ==
- History of Iran
- Famous Americans in Iran
- Persian Constitutional Revolution
- The Great Game
- U.S.-Iran relations
