= The Century Magazine =

US magazine (1881–1930)

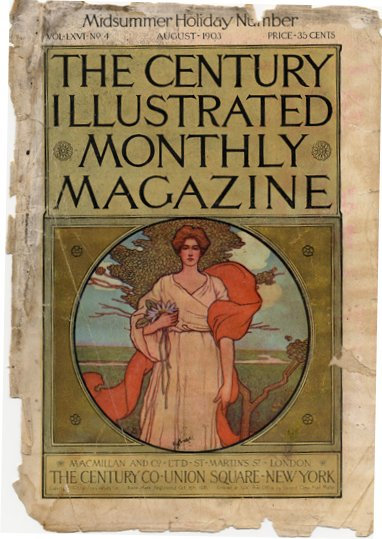
- First issue: 1881
- Final issue: 1930
- Company: The Century Company
- Country: United States
- Based in: New York City
- Language: English

The Century Magazine was an illustrated monthly magazine first published in the United States in 1881 by The Century Company of New York City, which had been bought in that year by Roswell Smith and renamed by him after the Century Association. It was the successor of Scribner's Monthly Magazine. It was merged into The Forum in 1930.

== History ==
The initial editor was to have been Scribner's editor and co-owner Josiah G. Holland, but he died prior to the appearance of the first issue. He was succeeded by Richard Watson Gilder, the managing editor of Scribner's, who would go on to helm The Century for 28 years. Gilder largely continued the mixture of literature, history, current events, and high-quality illustrations that Holland had used at Scribner's. The magazine was very successful during the 19th century, most notably for a series of articles about the American Civil War which ran for three years during the 1880s. It included reminiscences of 230 participants from all ranks of the service on both sides of the conflict. According to an author writing in The New York Times, the publication of The Century "made New-York, instead of London, the centre of the illustrated periodicals published in the English language…" The magazine was also a notable publisher of fiction, presenting excerpts of Mark Twain's Adventures of Huckleberry Finn in 1884 and 1885 and Henry James' The Bostonians.

Upon Gilder's death in 1909, Robert Underwood Johnson replaced him as editor. According to Arthur John, the magazine's "later history was marked by sudden shifts in content, format, and editorial direction." Glenn Frank was editor from 1921 to 1925, a period during which The Century was known for its editorials on current events and began to cut back on illustrations, which were eliminated after Frank left the magazine. In 1929, due to competition from cheaper magazines and newspapers, The Century became a quarterly, and in 1930 it was merged with The Forum. At the time it folded, The Century had 20,000 subscribers, less than a tenth of its peak circulation of the late nineteenth century. Scribner's Monthly Magazine, the periodical that became The Century in 1881, should not be confused with the Scribner's Magazine that began publication in 1887.

The noted critic and editor Frank Crowninshield briefly served as the magazine's art editor.

== Philosophy and political positions ==
The tone and content of The Century changed over its long history. It began as an Evangelical Christian publication, but over time began to speak to a more general educated audience as it developed into the largest periodical in the country.

=== Religion ===
Novelist and poet Josiah G. Holland was one of the three original founders of Scribner's Monthly and wrote regular editorials for the periodical, setting the tone for the magazine's content. As Holland was deeply religious, Scribner's to a great extent reflected the views and concerns of the Evangelical Christian community. While hostile towards sectarianism within Protestantism, Scribner's initially took a strong stand against both Catholicism and those who doubted the divinity of Christ. In the first issue, under the heading "Papa and the Dogma", Holland claimed that it was freedom that made the Protestant nations of Europe strong while their Catholic neighbors were, as a result of their religion, in a state of decay. Less than one year later, the magazine attacked the skepticism of Henry David Thoreau. Mormon polygamy was also a frequent target. One contributor traveled to Utah to observe the Mormon settlement there and argued that the new sect would have to end its practice of plural marriage if it were to survive and American control could be exercised over the western territories.

At the same time, Scribner's Monthly, being non-dogmatic in its Protestantism, expressed little hostility towards modern science. For example, a three-part series discussed how believing Christians should meet the intellectual challenges of religious skepticism, and in 1874 two writers engaged one another in a debate over whether Christians should attempt to prove the divinity of Christ through science.

By the end of the 1870s, however, Scribner's had departed from its original Evangelical orientation. An April 1879 editorial declared all seekers of truth, whether believing Christians or not, to be allies, regarding this new view as simply an application of the Golden Rule. Catholics were said to have just as much to teach Protestants as Protestants had to teach Catholics. After the magazine became The Century in 1881, it continued to hold onto this secular outlook under Gilder. The break with the past was reflected in the magazine's changing treatment of the question of evolution. In 1875, Scribner's argued that there was insufficient evidence to conclude that Darwinism was true and attributed its wide acceptance to a contemporary bias towards novel ideas, even though the author did not on principle reject the idea that proof could be forthcoming. Upon the death of Charles Darwin in 1883, however, The Century published a laudatory tribute to the scientist written by Alfred Wallace. The magazine remained secular into its later days, in 1923 criticizing the "poisonous dogmatism" of the thought of William Jennings Bryan and what the magazine saw as his religious fundamentalism. Over the years, The Century published works by a large number of writers who were agnostics or atheists, including famous skeptic Bertrand Russell.

=== American nationalism ===
From the very beginning of his tenure as editor in 1881 to his death in 1909, The Century reflected the ideals of Gilder. He sought to create and help shape a "refined" American high culture, often contributing his own poetry to that end.

An unsigned May 1885 editorial expressed pride over the belief of the staff that the periodical had achieved wide circulation while remaining a quality product. This reflected the view that as a general matter there was usually a tradeoff between quality and quantity. The Century was generally seen as a conservative magazine and hoped to promote reconciliation between the North and South after the trauma of the Civil War. According to J. Arthur Bond, the magazine was instrumental in creating and shaping post-war American nationalism. In the words of one contemporary, Gilder's "spirited and tireless endeavor [ ] was to give the organic life of the American people purity of character and nobility of expression." During his tenure as editor, he promoted patriotism and the glorification of American historical figures. Seeing itself as having an "elevating" mission, its "mixture of nationalism and cultural advocacy informed even the most 'ordinary' of the magazine's articles." Often touching on many of these themes, Theodore Roosevelt wrote as a regular contributor to the magazine over three decades, a span which included one article he published while serving as president. Gilder developed relationships with several contemporary prominent figures, including a close friendship with Grover Cleveland which he wrote about upon the death of the former president.

Concerns over national unity and the preservation of traditional American culture were reflected in the magazine's writings on immigration. An 1884 article discussed the composition and geographical distribution of immigrant populations, and expressed optimism over the prospect of the newer Americans assimilating into the larger population. At the same time, the article warned that measures should be taken against potential threats to national unity through fractionalization. As immigration increased over the next few decades, however, The Century became more alarmed over its effects on the future of the country, citing concerns over, among other matters, crime, illiteracy, and the overpopulation of cities. In 1904, Senator Henry Cabot Lodge took to the pages of the magazine to argue for the importance of keeping out "undesirable" immigrants. Twenty years later, editor Glenn Frank attacked the Ku Klux Klan and other nativists, but nonetheless wrote that "[t]he hour for very severe restrictions on immigration has come…" The same author returned to some of the same themes when he again attacked the KKK several months later for both its religious and racial doctrines.

=== Reconstruction and civil rights ===
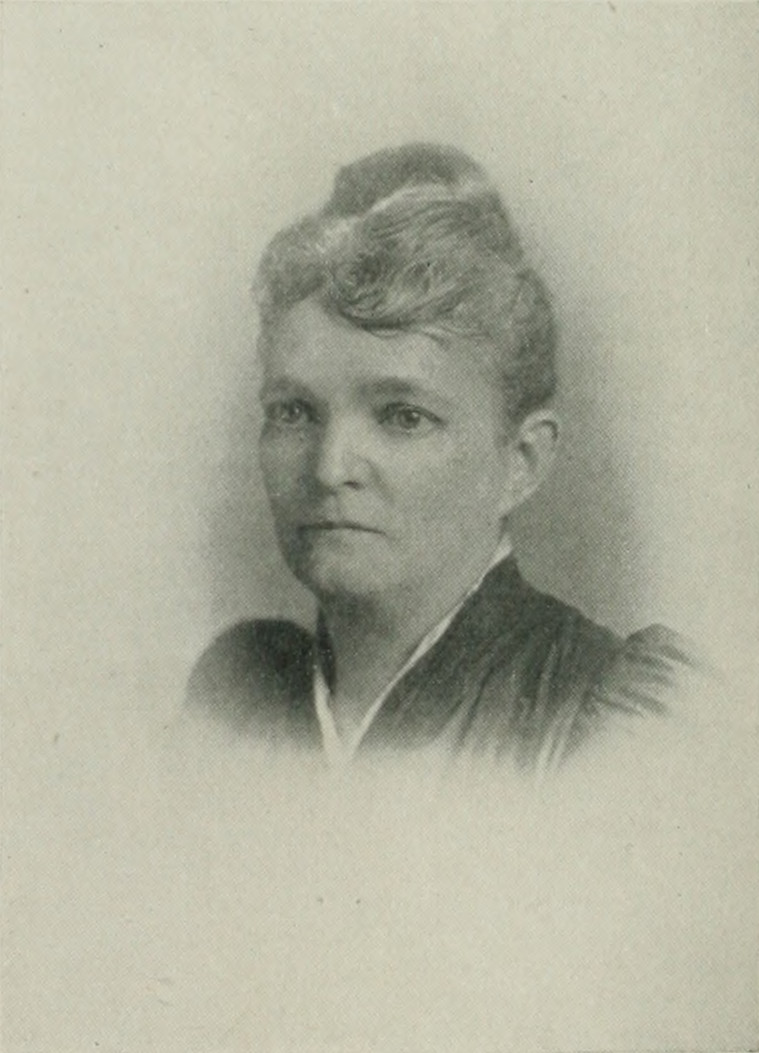
D. R. Miller's "War Diary" (The Century, 1886) attracted a great deal of attention.

In the immediate post-Reconstruction era, contributors to The Century debated what should be done about the postwar South and the newly freed enslaved citizens, generally advocating for amicable relations between the regions and national unity. In 1873 and 1874, Scribner's ran a number of articles under the title "The Great South," a series which lasted fourteen issues. Based on Edward King's travels, the author's accounts generally portrayed the region in a sympathetic light and the series was warmly received by Southerners. In 1876, Scribner's published a eulogy to Robert E. Lee, along with an editorial postscript praising the spirit of "sectional friendliness" of the piece. (Note: The Lost Cause Mythology had already taken root in American letters as evidenced by the positive eulogy just eleven years after the end of the Rebellion.)

On the question of the freedmen, a wide variety of contemporary views were represented. Writing for Scribner's in 1874, one author argued that Blacks were unfit to be schooled with white children. On the other hand, an 1885 article by George W. Cable despaired over what he saw as the failure to protect the rights of southern Blacks after the Civil War and argued that this was the result of the former confederate states evading federal law. Henry W. Grady, responding a few months later, disputed the earlier author's characterization of the situation, claiming that while legal rights had been granted, southern whites would never accept social integration between the races. Cable's criticisms of the ex-Confederacy also drew a rebuke by Robert Lewis Dabney.

Even when sympathetic to the cause of the newly freed, writers who argued for helping them usually did so on paternalistic grounds. Bishop T. U. Dudley, for example, expressed doubt that much could be done to elevate the status of American Blacks, but argued that Christian principles required helping them to the greatest extent possible.

The question of how much government policy could do to improve the circumstances of the formerly enslaved continued to be debated over the decades. By the turn of the century, the debates were conducted in the language of science. Robert Bennett Bean, a medical doctor, published a 1906 article arguing that social policy should be based on realistic assessments of the relative mental capacities of Blacks and whites. He claimed that Blacks had, on average, smaller brains than Asians or Caucasians, a finding he attributed to heredity. Similarly, Charles Francis Adams Jr. spent two years in Egypt and the Sudan and referenced his experiences to argue in 1906 that the unfortunate circumstances of American Blacks were mainly due to inherently low capabilities rather than history. In the same issue, however, the editors felt it necessary to mention the dissenting view of Franz Boas, who had painted a more optimistic picture of the potential of Africans in a different periodical two years earlier.

Booker T. Washington contributed four articles to the magazine in the first decade of the twentieth century, including one on "Heroes in Black Skins." and another that discussed efforts of blacks to become homeowners. A 1903 editorial sang the praises of Washington, calling him the "Moses of his people" and contrasting him favorably with W.E.B. Du Bois.

Reflecting the magazine's later shift leftward, Du Bois himself contributed an article to The Century in 1923. Several editorials around that time criticized the revived Ku Klux Klan of the 1920s. Frank Tannenbaum, for example, wrote that the Klan of the Reconstruction era "was a reflex of the vindictiveness of Northern politicians and of the unscrupulous carpet-baggers who swooped down upon the South as a vulture upon a wounded and stricken victim." (Note: Again, even Tannenbaum was influenced by Confederate apologists negative portrayal of reconstruction.) But the contemporary Klan, according to Tannenbaum, had no such justification and simply reflected fears of change and other pathologies of segments of the white population.

=== Progressive causes ===
The magazine championed several Progressive causes popular in its time. Among these were several civil service reforms including competitive examinations for public offices, which its writers saw as a way to promote good governance and reduce class privilege. Similarly, in 1894 Henry Cabot Lodge attacked the "un-American" practice of patronage. The Century also took up some of the environmental causes of its day, expressing satisfaction over the first attempts by the federal government to preserve the nation's forests, and in its later days supported women's suffrage. Finally, the magazine occasionally published articles in favor of eugenics. Frank, for example, while disparaging the racism of the KKK, encouraged what he called the better individuals of every race to use the tools of modern science to focus on improving the genetic quality of all populations.

=== Socialism and the labor movement ===
Scribner's generally defended the principles of classical economics and opposed socialism. William Graham Sumner wrote an article for the magazine in this vein praising traditional capitalist virtues such as self-reliance and individualism and attributing poverty to laziness and vice. On the other hand, Holland occasionally directed his ire towards "soulless" corporations that he accused of exploiting workers. In the view of the magazine, both capitalists and workers had moral obligations.

In its early days, The Century tended to adopt the same views as its predecessor. It defended capitalism, but refrained from unreflectively denouncing all forms of regulation. For example, an 1886 article opposed socialism but argued that in the future there would be more need for government activism than there had been in the past. Over the next few decades, The Century published several forceful denunciations of socialist theories and practice. In the 1890s Gilder and his editors took the position that labor unions were a foreign imposition, one of the many negative consequences of a relatively open immigration policy. Similarly, socialism was said to punish success, a concept that was anathema to the philosophy of his magazine.

Despite its conservative leanings, the magazine was open to dissenting views on economic issues in a way that it was not on deeper philosophical matters. The March 1904 issue allowed workers to publish contributions making the case for labor unions as appropriate checks on big business. Two years later, an editorial praised some of the accomplishments of the labor movement, while still maintaining that it needed to be reformed.

In its later years, after the Russian Revolution had brought the issue to the attention of the public, The Century opposed the spread of Communism. Employing Nietzschean terminology, Lothrop Stoddard in 1919 called Bolshevism "the heresy of the Underman," in contrast to Prussianism, the "heresy of the Overman," which had been defeated in World War I. He went on to argue that the Bolshevik Revolution had only been the local manifestation of a phenomenon that would have to be defeated worldwide and that Vladimir Lenin was "a modern Jenghiz Khan plotting the plunder of a world."

=== Turn-of-the-20th-century decline ===
While remaining extremely influential and well-regarded among the American elite, the popularity of The Century began to decline in the 1890s and never regained the prominence it had enjoyed as the leading American periodical of the late nineteenth century. By 1900, it had about 125,000 subscribers, half of the circulation it had in the 1880s. The Century suffered due to competition from other cheaper magazines, many of which Gilder and his staff considered vulgar.

Although Gilder had been a zealous reformer, as a conservative in politics and values he never embraced the Progressive movement. As its circulation declined, the magazine took a more pessimistic tone and began to write less and less about current events. An 1898 editorial criticized "the profusion in the literary and pictorial 'output' which has a tendency to befog the intellect and lower the standards of taste." A few months later the magazine lamented that the "age of reflection" had given way to the "age of agitation" spread by "[f]ast trains and cheap print…" Similarly, a 1902 editorial argued that divorce was a threat to civilization, and nothing would be more likely to cure this ill than literature "celebrating the sanctive and ever-lasting virtues of self-control, forbearance, devotion, and honor." Gilder characteristically saw a connection between a decline in morals and contemporary social problems and believed, conversely, that ennobling art could be a solution.

Even in an artistic sense, The Century of the late nineteenth century was slow to adapt to the times. In 1889, after much resistance it became the last major periodical to include photographic illustrations. The editors remained attached to painted drawings, which The Century had become renowned for. In the pages of the magazine Gilder explained this preference by complaining of the trend toward the "minute and literal representation of the visible world" seen in photography, as opposed to painting, which preserved only that which deserved to be recorded for posterity. He went on to argue that the spread of printing and writing would have a similar vulgarizing and cheapening effect on the written word.

Thus, the magazine maintained a great deal of self-awareness about the causes of its declining influence. According to one modern author, in the first decade of the twentieth century, Gilder and the other editors "continued to bear aloft the flame of the ideal" in a changing era and gave "no thought of cheapening the magazine to slow the steady drifting away of subscribers." After Gilder's death in 1909, The Century survived another two decades, but never regained its position as the leading American periodical.

=== Later years, 1909–1930 ===
Robert Underwood Johnson was editor of The Century from Gilder's death in 1909 until his resignation in 1913. The 1910s were marked by financial difficulties and a further decline, as the magazine competed with other periodicals of both similar and lesser quality. The Century still attracted some of the best fiction authors of the day, however. H. G. Wells' "prophetic trilogy" The World Set Free was serialized in the magazine in the first three issues of 1914.

Glenn Frank became editor of The Century in 1921, until he left this position in 1925 to become president of the University of Wisconsin–Madison. He wrote a series of editorials in which he laid out his thoughts on the future of Western civilization. The editorials used colorful language and usually stressed the idea that contemporary social problems had created a need for social engineering and government activism in both domestic and international affairs. For example, in 1923, Frank wrote that Senator Lodge and his isolationist supporters were "the amoeba of politics, strange survivals from a prehistoric era of the lowest form of political intelligence." He later argued for what he called "an intelligently flexible conservatism." While warning of what he referred to as the dangers of reactionaries on the right and radicals on the left, Frank was also known for expressing a great deal of optimism over the prospect of using the social sciences to improve human affairs. This kind of enthusiasm for reform through science rather than moral progress was a noticeable break from the philosophy of the magazine during the eras of Holland and Gilder.

Other writers stressed similar themes throughout the Frank era. Reflecting the magazine's tilt to the left, a 1924 article called for "industrial democracy" to be adopted in American factories. Even the magazine's opposition to socialism was tempered, with Benjamin Stolberg arguing that the Red Scare had been an overreaction and that the Bolshevik threat to the United States had failed to materialize. The leftward shift during this time was not total, however, and, despite the tone that Frank's editorials gave to the magazine, The Century remained open to a wide variety of views. Noted conservative G.K. Chesterton, for example, contributed an essay that was highly critical of contemporary art.

Frank was succeeded in 1925 by Hewitt H. Howland, who remained as editor until the magazine merged with The Forum in 1930.

== Historical memoirs and major reporting ==
=== Civil War series ===
In 1877, Scribner's published a series of short accounts from those who took part in the Battle of Mobile Bay. The parent publishing house released a series of books, The Army in the Civil War, in 13 volumes penned by U.S. Army veterans who had participated in the operations that they wrote about. This series became a best-seller. The Century continued this kind of historical reporting with Alexander R. Boteler's first-person account of John Brown's raid on Harpers Ferry it published in 1883, followed in the same issue by a rejoinder from Frank B. Sanborn, a self-described "radical abolitionist" who had helped finance the mission.

Gilder, himself a Union veteran, soon began regularly running the reflections of major Civil War figures. Originally planned to run for twelve months, the series drew so much interest that it lasted for three years and eventually led to a four-volume book. Among the contributors to the series were Union generals Ulysses S. Grant, William Tecumseh Sherman, Philip Sheridan, and George B. McClellan. As The Century tried to avoid bias and promote American unity, it also sought out and accepted accounts from those on the Confederate side, including the generals James Longstreet and P. G. T. Beauregard. The contributions led readers who had served in the war to submit unsolicited recollections and previously unpublished documents to the magazine, in addition to criticisms and rebuttals of published pieces. These submissions were so numerous that in 1885 The Century began to include them in a section titled "Memoranda on the Civil War." The magazine had in effect become a forum for those who had fought each other in battle two decades earlier. In the pages of The Century, they could discuss their battles and mutually celebrate the bravery and heroism of both sides.

The idea for soliciting recollections of the Civil War originally came from assistant editor Clarence Buel, who later wrote of the difficulties he had in going about convincing former military leaders to share their experiences. In fact, Grant would not agree to contribute to the series until the former general and president had run into financial difficulties. The editors became engrossed in the Civil War project, and sometimes took tours of the famous battle sites, bringing along commanders to explain their exploits and artists to draw sketches of the scenes for the magazine. The Century office became a regular meeting place for former comrades and adversaries, as reflected in a letter an excited Gilder sent to his wife exclaiming "Grant one day and Beauregard the next!"

Before the publication of the series, Sherman was the only major figure of the war who had written a first-person account. Afterwards, the works that Grant, Sheridan, and McClellan contributed to The Century led to books by each of those generals.

As a result of the Civil War recollections, the number of subscribers to the magazine jumped to 250,000, a then unprecedented number for a magazine of its kind. Edward Weeks wrote that even by 1950 no "quality magazine" had ever had as many subscribers as The Century did in the 1880s, even though by that time the reading public had tripled in size. As of 1892, it was also the most widely circulated periodical of its price in England, with 20,000 subscribers.

=== Lincoln biography ===
The Century also acquired the rights to publish excerpts from the manuscript of a biography of President Abraham Lincoln written by his former secretaries John Hay and John G. Nicolay. The result was a series titled Abraham Lincoln: A History, which ran over three years. Decades later, The Century returned to Abraham Lincoln as a symbol of the republic's lost virtue. The February 1909 issue had a drawing of Lincoln on its cover and included twenty-two portraits of the former president within its pages along with pictures of his life mask and a cast of his hands. Gilder's contribution to the issue, "Lincoln the Leader", held the subject up as an ideal for modern statesmen to emulate.

=== Russian dissidents ===
In the late 1880s, George Kennan traveled to Russia and wrote a series of reports on the revolutionaries who had opposed Tsar Alexander II and been sent to prisons in Siberia. Seeing him as a writer sympathetic to the autocratic regime and hostile towards its opponents, the Russian government granted Kennan relative freedom to travel around the country. During his travels, however, the author changed his mind and wrote accounts that were highly critical of the regime. His reports included detailed illustrations of the suffering of those who suffered on account of their opposition to the government. In one article, Kennan told the story of how when the decision to assassinate the Tsar was made, 47 individuals volunteered to carry out the mission. Arguing that individuals fighting for civil liberties were rarely as fanatical as the Russian revolutionaries, Kennan wrote that he believed that it was the treatment of prisoners that led to such stringent opposition to the government. He noted that "playing upon the deepest and most intense of human emotions as a means of extorting information from unwilling witnesses" was routine in prisons holding political offenders. For example, a young woman was led to incriminate her loved ones by being told that they had already confessed. Sometimes, a revolutionary would be told that he was going to meet his mother, taken to her, and then stopped and later informed that he would only see her if he answered questions about his past activities. A twenty-two-year-old mother was falsely led to believe that if she did not cooperate with the authorities her infant could be taken from her. The author also reported that it was common practice for prisoners to be left in solitary confinement for years while government officials searched the empire for evidence with which the offenders could be charged. Kennan came to see himself as a voice for the Russian liberals and was subsequently banned from the country. His writings on Russia were eventually published in a two-volume book. A representative of the Russian government replied to Kennan's arguments in The Century in 1893. and the magazine subsequently published a rebuttal by the author.

Kennan's writings on Russia and his subsequent activism were perhaps the main causes behind the rise of anti-Tsar sentiment and sympathy for the revolutionary cause among late nineteenth-century American elites. In addition to publishing magazine articles and books, the author also began to give popular lectures on the subject, including dozens of speeches in Chicago, New York City, and Boston. In order to make an impression on the crowd, Kennan would often appear in front of them in the ragged clothes and shackles of a Russian prisoner. This advocacy inspired the formation of a number of American organizations that took up the cause of the exiles, the most prominent of them being the Society of Friends of Russian Freedom.

=== Other histories and recollections ===
In the early 1900s, The Century continued to publish the writings of some of the most famous historians of the era along with first-person accounts of those who had worked in the highest levels of government.

Justin Harvey Smith published four articles on the American Revolution in The Century in 1902 and 1903. The next year, S. Weir Mitchell contributed a series on the life of George Washington as a young man.

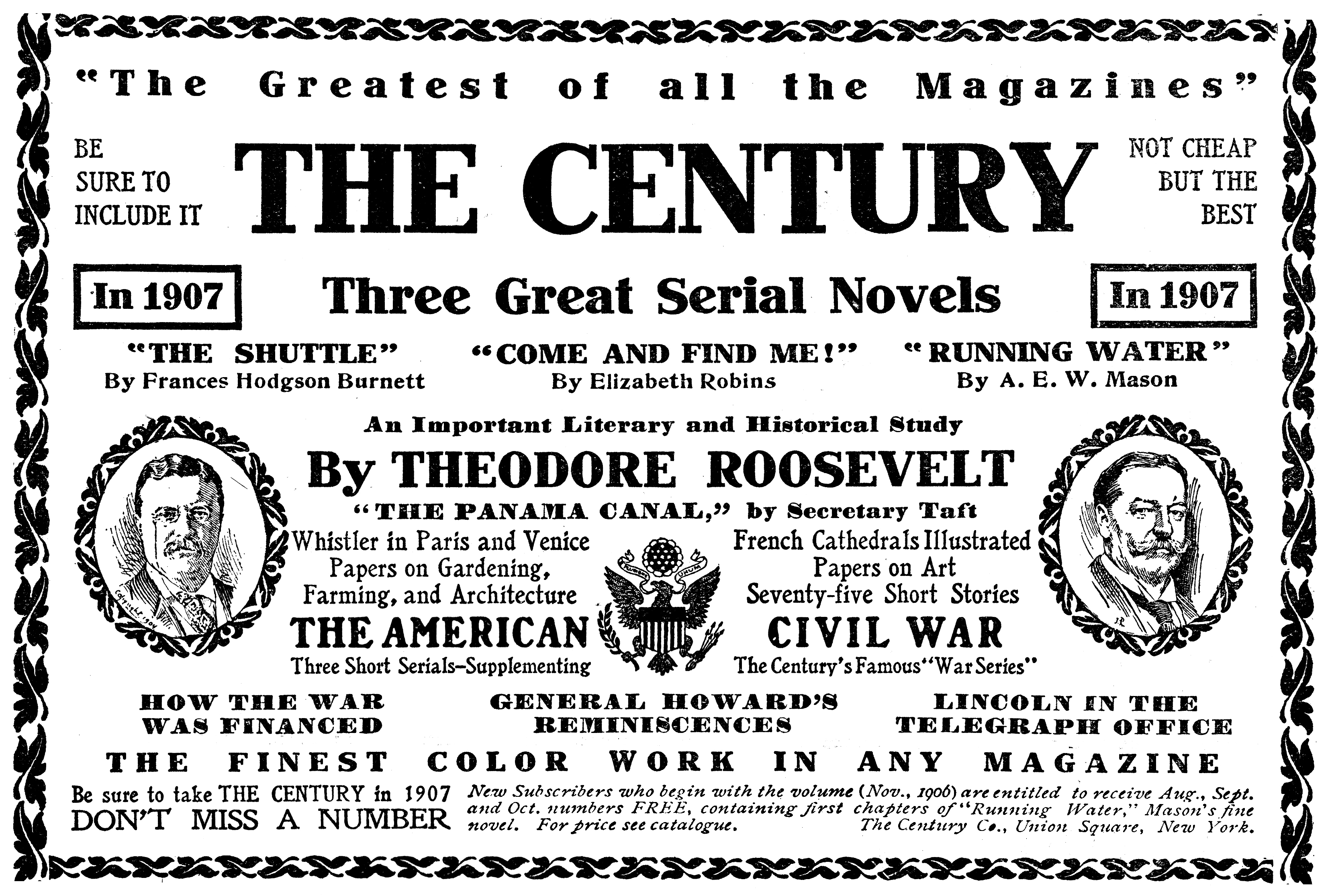
1907 advertisement for The Century promoting writings by President Roosevelt and then Secretary of War William Taft

In addition to Theodore Roosevelt, The Century claimed a handful of other presidents as contributors. Grover Cleveland provided an account of perhaps the tensest moment of his two presidential administrations, the 1895 Venezuela border controversy with Britain. Andrew D. White contributed a series titled "Chapters from My Diplomatic Life" on his experiences serving in Germany and Russia. In September 1901, Woodrow Wilson wrote "Edmund Burke and the French Revolution" while still a professor at Princeton. In 1907 future President William Howard Taft wrote about the Panama Canal while serving as Secretary of War.

Over the years, The Century also published first person accounts of individuals who had worked for various presidents. Col. William H. Cook, a bodyguard who served for over 50 years in the White House, shared his memories of the administrations of Andrew Johnson and Rutherford B. Hayes. Historian James Ford Rhodes also contributed an article on the Hayes Administration, which the editors called a kind of postscript to the last-published volume of his history of the United States.

== Science ==
In its early years, Scribner's Monthly published a regular feature titled "Nature and Science." Remaining consistent with its broad mission to educate the public, The Century published articles by some of the most prominent scientists and inventors of the day. Thomas Edison contributed to a symposium on roentgen rays and also once sat for an interview with the magazine. In the June 1900 issue, Nikola Tesla contributed a long article on "the problem of increasing human energy." In a piece that combined the magazine's interests in political and scientific issues, geneticist and Marxist J.B.S. Haldane published a 1923 article on the societal implications of technological progress.

== Literature and the arts ==
Gilder has been called the "literary arbiter of his time." Support for artistic excellence reflected his belief in the importance of self-improvement and the celebration of high standards. The works that appeared in his time also reflected the magazine's moralism, as they banned references to sex, vulgarity, and insults to Christianity.

The Century published the works of a number of major literary figures. In addition to the aforementioned works of Mark Twain and Henry James, pulp magazine author Ellis Parker Butler contributed 30 stories, articles and poems to the magazine between 1896 and 1913, including "My Cyclone-proof House", which appeared in the November 1896 issue. This short story was Butler's first piece published in a major magazine. His works were illustrated by such famous artists as Jay Hambidge, May Wilson Preston, Florence Scovel Shinn, Frederic Dorr Steele, and Frederic R. Gruger. The Century published a full-color portrait of Butler (with his wife Ada and daughter Elsie) in the December 1909 issue. The portrait was drawn by family friend Ernest L. Blumenschein. The magazine also published the work of Jack London and the first-person account and ink drawings from Tierra del Fuego of American painter Rockwell Kent.

Noted engraver Alexander Wilson Drake was a long-time contributor to both The Century Magazine and its earlier incarnation as Scribner's Monthly. The Century Company produced a memorial edition of Alexander Wilson Drake's fiction and art titled Three Midnight Stories in 1916. The Century also employed many notable editorial cartoonists, including Oscar Cesare.

Bohemian composer Antonín Dvořák was another noted contributor to The Century Magazine, writing during his stay at the National Conservatory in New York in the 1890s. In 1894, The Century Magazine published his fine tribute to fellow composer Franz Schubert.

During the 1900s and 1910s the Anglo-Canadian poet, story writer and essayist Marjorie Pickthall was a regular contributor to The Century Magazine.

Marcus Eli Ravage, a Romanian-born Jewish-American essayist and biographer, published extensively in The Century Magazine during the 1910s and 1920s, covering a variety of issues including on antisemitism, some of which were later stripped of their original ironic intent and misused by Nazi propaganda and post-war antisemitic discourse.

== See also ==
- Century Dictionary
- Century type family
