= Three Midnight Stories =

Alexander Wilson Drake
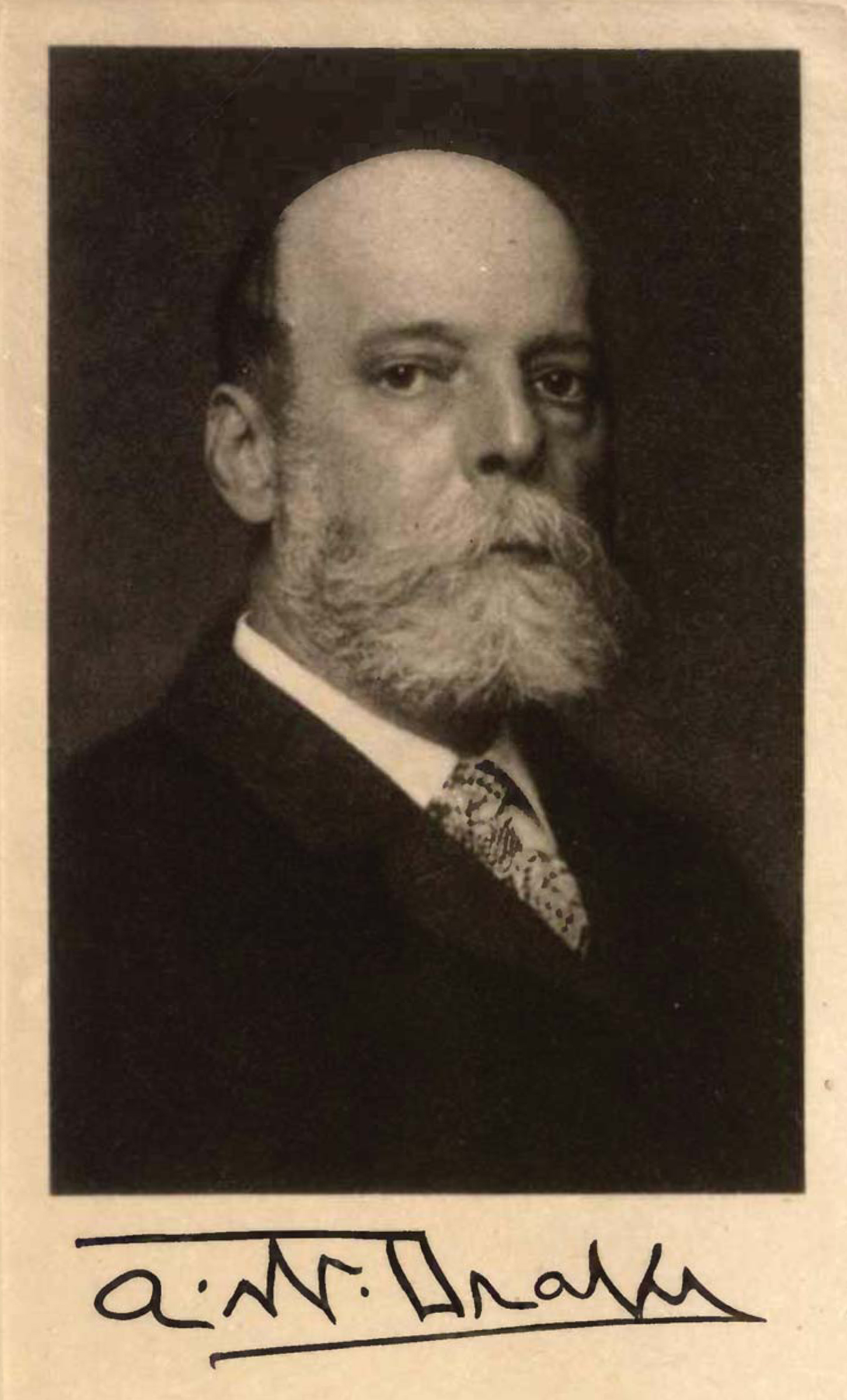
- Born: 1843; United States
- Died: 1916 (aged 72–73); New York, United States
- Occupations: artist and writer

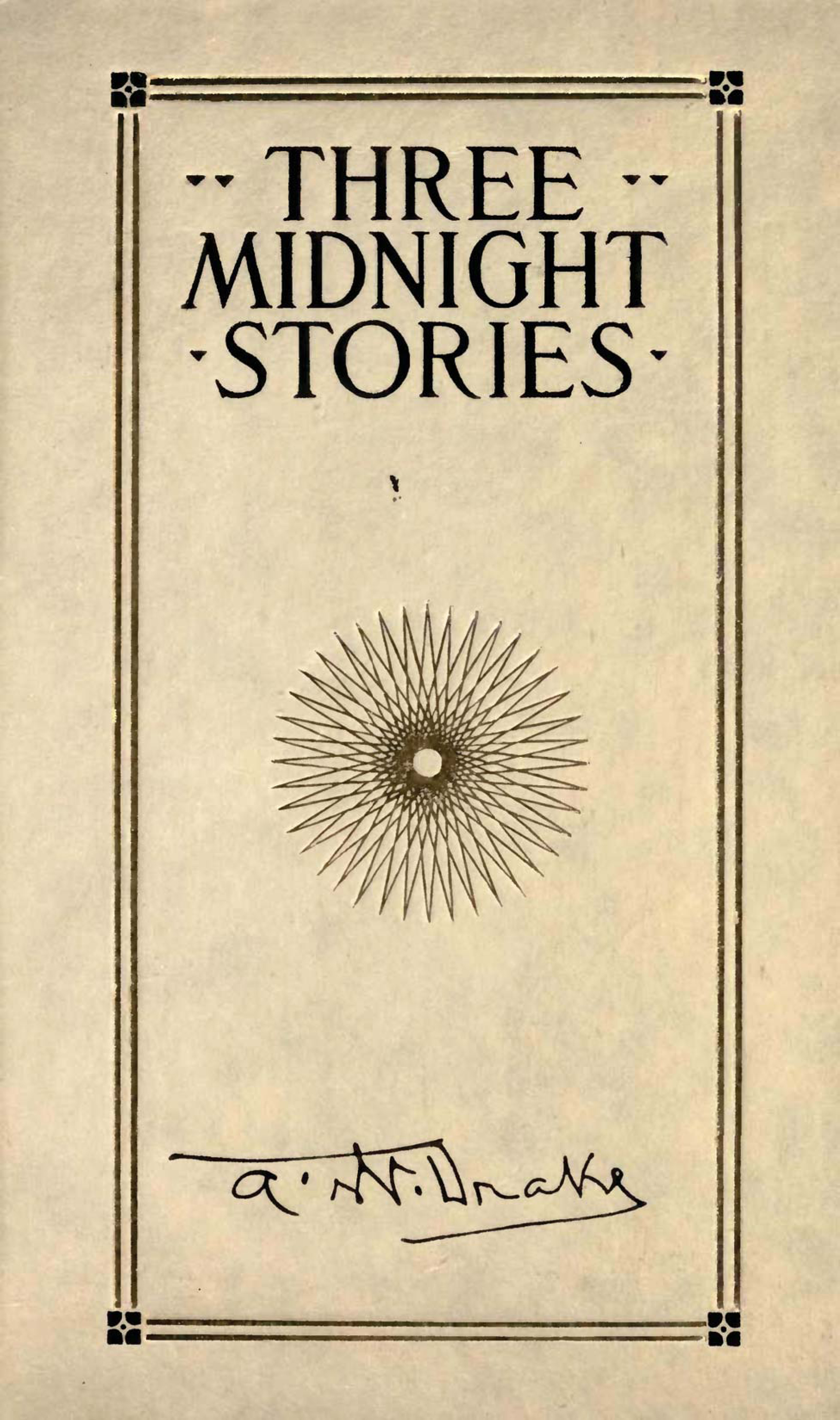
Engraved frontispiece from Three Midnight Stories, Alexander Wilson Drake, 1916.

Three Midnight Stories is an English-language collection of three of Alexander Wilson Drake's short stories along with several poems brought together and interspersed with many of his engravings, as well as photographic prints of his residence and art collection.

This printing, the first and only edition, was printed in New York City in 1916. It was produced as a memorial by Drake's employer, The Century Company. A print run of a total of 500 hand-numbered copies was produced and distributed to family and friends. The book is 88 pages (including dividers) with over 30 illustrations; a mix of photographs and engravings. Books were hard-bound, with paper jacket, boxed. Box had title slip gummed on front with copy number hand-written below the title. Box and book were hand-numbered to match.

The stories were originally published in short succession in Century Magazine around the year 1902 or 1903. They are precursors of the later wave of "weird fiction". The first is of an artist who is collecting all the elements required for a haunted house; the second of a man who wished to acquire a halo for his dead wife; the third is of an experiment with a bird and balloon.

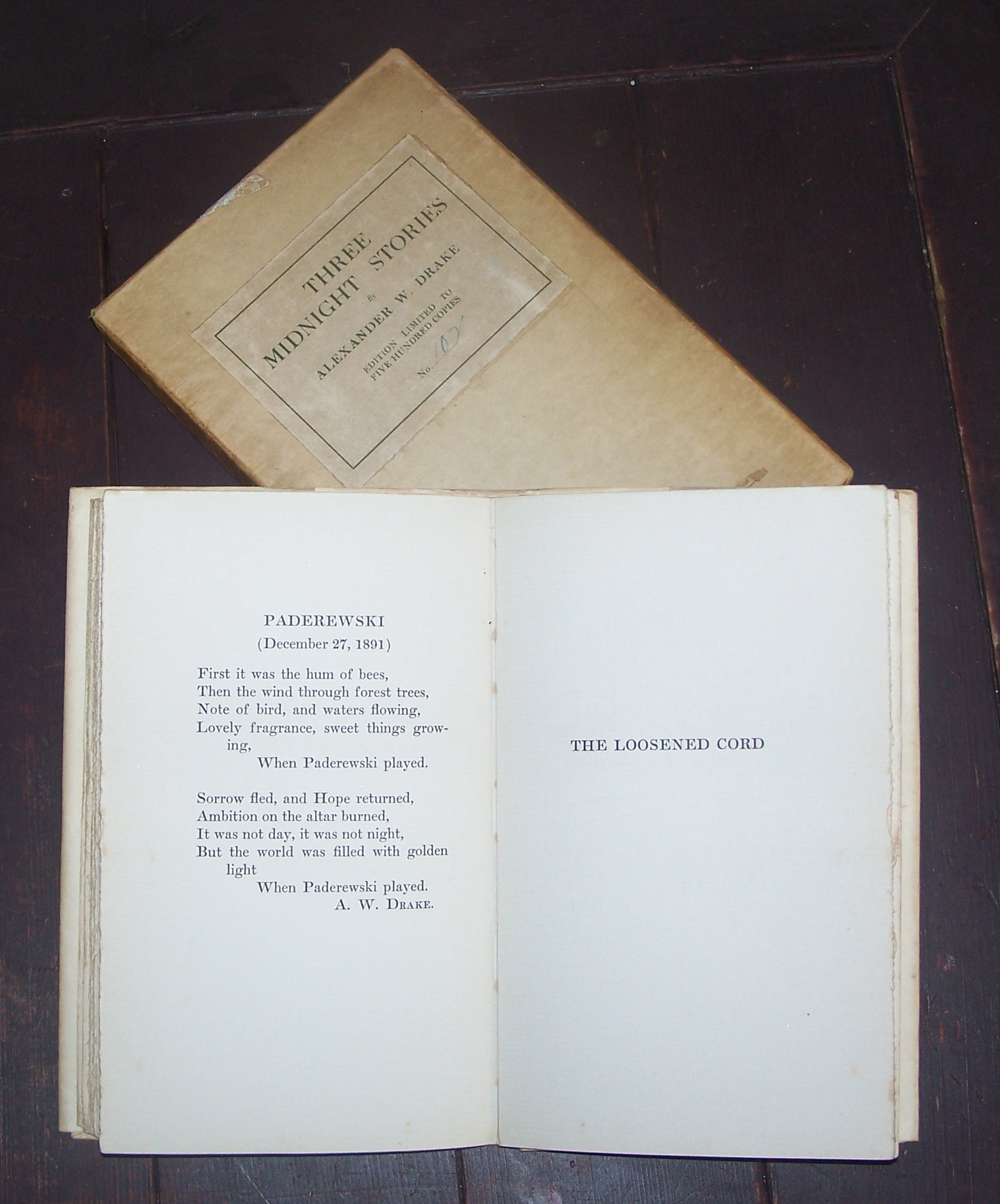
Three Midnight Stories with presentation box, estate of Walter Leighton Clark. Copy hand-numbered 102 of 500. Book is open to "Paderewski" – a tribute to Polish pianist Ignacy Jan Paderewski
