= Clarence Clough Buel =

American journalist

- Born: June 29, 1850 Laona, New York, U.S.
- Died: May 22, 1923 (aged 72) North Tarrytown, New York, U.S.
- Occupation: Editor; Author
- Genre: Non-fiction
- Subject: American Civil War

Clarence Clough Buel (29 July 1850 in Laona, New York – 22 May 1933 in North Tarrytown, New York) was a United States editor and author, most notable for his work with Robert Underwood Johnson to produce the 1887 book Battles and Leaders of the Civil War and its predecessors.

== Biography ==
Buel was connected with the New York Tribune from 1875 to 1881, when he joined the staff of Century Magazine, and, in 1883, in conjunction with Robert Underwood Johnson, began the editing of the Century articles on the American Civil War. These articles were afterward expanded and compiled into the book Battles and Leaders of the Civil War (1887). He was associate editor of Century Magazine 1909-13, advisory editor until May 1914.

Buel attended the University of Minnesota, the Friedrich Wilhelm University of Berlin, and the Ludwig-Maximilians-Universität München. He married Mary Alice Snow in 1888; she died in 1898, and in 1903 he married Maria Victoria Torrilhon.
