= Ranghieri =

Ranghieri is an Italian surname. The history of this surname goes back to Medieval times. Ranghieri are originated from Westphalia (Germany) around the year 1000. The Ranghieri family moved to Italy and settled down in Verona area.

Notable people with the surname include:

- Giovan Battista Ranghieri (approx. 1600), sculptor in Verona North of Italy
- Walter Ranghieri, (born 1895, date of death unknown) Italian sport and Olympic wrestler
- Alex Ranghieri (born 1987), Italian beach volleyball player
