= Robert Underwood Johnson =

American writer, poet and diplomat (1853–1937)

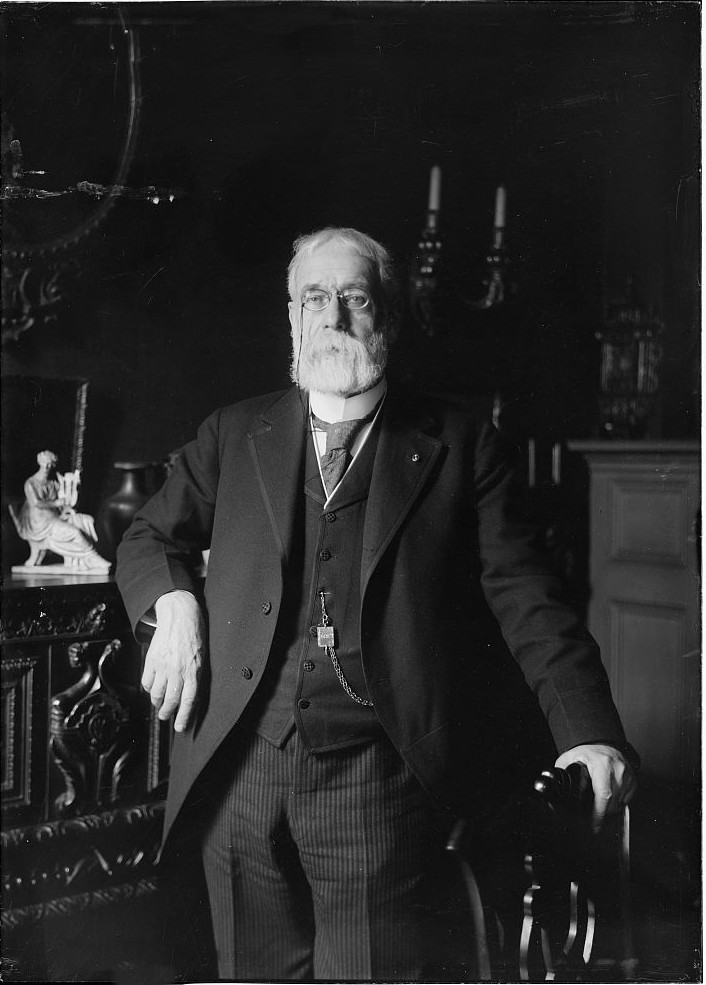
- Johnson in 1920

United States Ambassador to Italy
- In office April 22, 1920 – May 20, 1921
- President: Woodrow Wilson
- Preceded by: Thomas Nelson Page
- Succeeded by: Richard Washburn Child

Personal details
- Born: January 12, 1853 Washington, D.C., U.S.
- Died: October 14, 1937 (aged 84) New York City, New York, U.S.
- Education: Earlham College

Robert Underwood Johnson (January 12, 1853 – October 14, 1937) was an American writer, poet, and diplomat.

== Biography ==
Robert Underwood Johnson was born on Capitol Hill, Washington, D.C. on January 12, 1853, and spent his childhood in Centerville, Indiana. His brother Henry Underwood Johnson became a member of Congress from that district (1881–1889). His father, Nimrod Hoge Johnson, was a lawyer and judge. His mother, Catherine Coyle Underwood, was a suffragette. He was schooled in Calvinist Presbyterianism by his uncle by marriage, the Reverend Charles H. Raymond, who served as chargé d'affaires of the Republic of Texas at Washington before its admission as a state of the Union and by Quakerism of the Johnsons.

He attended the Quaker Earlham College in Richmond, Indiana, beginning at age fourteen and graduated with a B.S. in 1871. Johnson's first work was as a clerk in Chicago, Illinois, agency of the educational books of Charles Scribner's Sons, and in 1873 he entered the firm's New York office, beginning his long connection with The Century Magazine, then Scribner's Monthly, under Josiah Gilbert Holland. The Century Magazine was directed at political, religious, artistic, and social opinion leaders. One of his first major projects for Scribner was the editing of "Century War Series" (1883) and the subsequent four volumes Battles and Leaders of the Civil War (1887–88), to raise circulation (by 100,000), was a series on the great battles of the Civil War from the point of view of officers on both sides based on accounts sourced from soldiers' family records. Johnson secured four papers from General Ulysses S. Grant, which later formed the basis of Grant's Memoirs.

He married Katharine McMahon in Washington, DC, on August 31, 1876. They had a son, Owen McMahon Johnson (1878–1952), who became an American writer in his own right, and a daughter, Agnes McMahon Johnson (1880–1968). After their honeymoon, which included attendance at the Philadelphia Exhibition, the couple relocated to the Murray Hill neighborhood in New York City. While in New York City, Johnson's love of nature and exploration extended to outings and ramblings. He was surrounded by social friends for musical and literary evenings and consumed all art forms, including opera and theater. His friends from the US and abroad included Tommaso Salvini, Paderewski, the Clemenses, Kipling and Eleonora Duse. By the 1890s, Johnson and his wife became friends with the inventor Nikola Tesla, for whom Johnson wrote a poem. He also collaborated with Tesla transliterating Serbian poems by Jovan Jovanović Zmaj in The Century Magazine.

== International copyright ==
Johnson was a proponent of the establishment of international copyright protections. As secretary of the American Copyright League, he helped pass the Law of 1891, for which the French and Italian governments decorated him. The silver fruit stand honoring his role is in the Academy of Arts & Letters collection. Johnson's role in the creation, initial passage, and reauthorization of the act to end intellectual piracy in the US ranged from his position at The Century as an officer of the Copyright League, lobbying Members of Congress, participation in a conference to secure support from labor unions, negotiating with the Congressional conference committee. Johnson was called the father of international copyright law.

== Land preservation ==
Johnson advocated for the forest reservation system and a scientific national conservation policy. In 1889, after Johnson and naturalist John Muir met in San Francisco, the two camped out together at Soda Springs, in Tuolumne Meadows; subsequently, in a letter, Johnson encouraged Muir to "start an association" to help protect California's natural wonders, especially the Yosemite – his repeated urging eventually inspired the formation of the Sierra Club in 1892.

Leveraging the influence of The Century in conjunction with Muir, Johnson was one of the driving forces behind the creation of Yosemite National Park in California in 1890 and 1913. He served as chairman of a national commission for preserving that area and is credited with writing the bill. Muir dedicated his book The Yosemite to Johnson.

Johnson also persistently, though vainly, opposed the city of San Francisco, California's acquisition of the Hetch-Hetchy Valley as a reservoir. In 1906, in letters to President Theodore Roosevelt, he proposed a conference of governors to conserve the forests of the Eastern states, which grew into the White House Conference on Conservation.

In 2017, a plaque commemorating Johnson's role in Muir's relationship was erected at Tuolumne Meadows, where Johnson and Muir discussed land preservation in 1889. Their story was recounted in Ken Burns's public television series on Our National Parks.

== Hall of Fame and American Academy of Arts and Letters ==
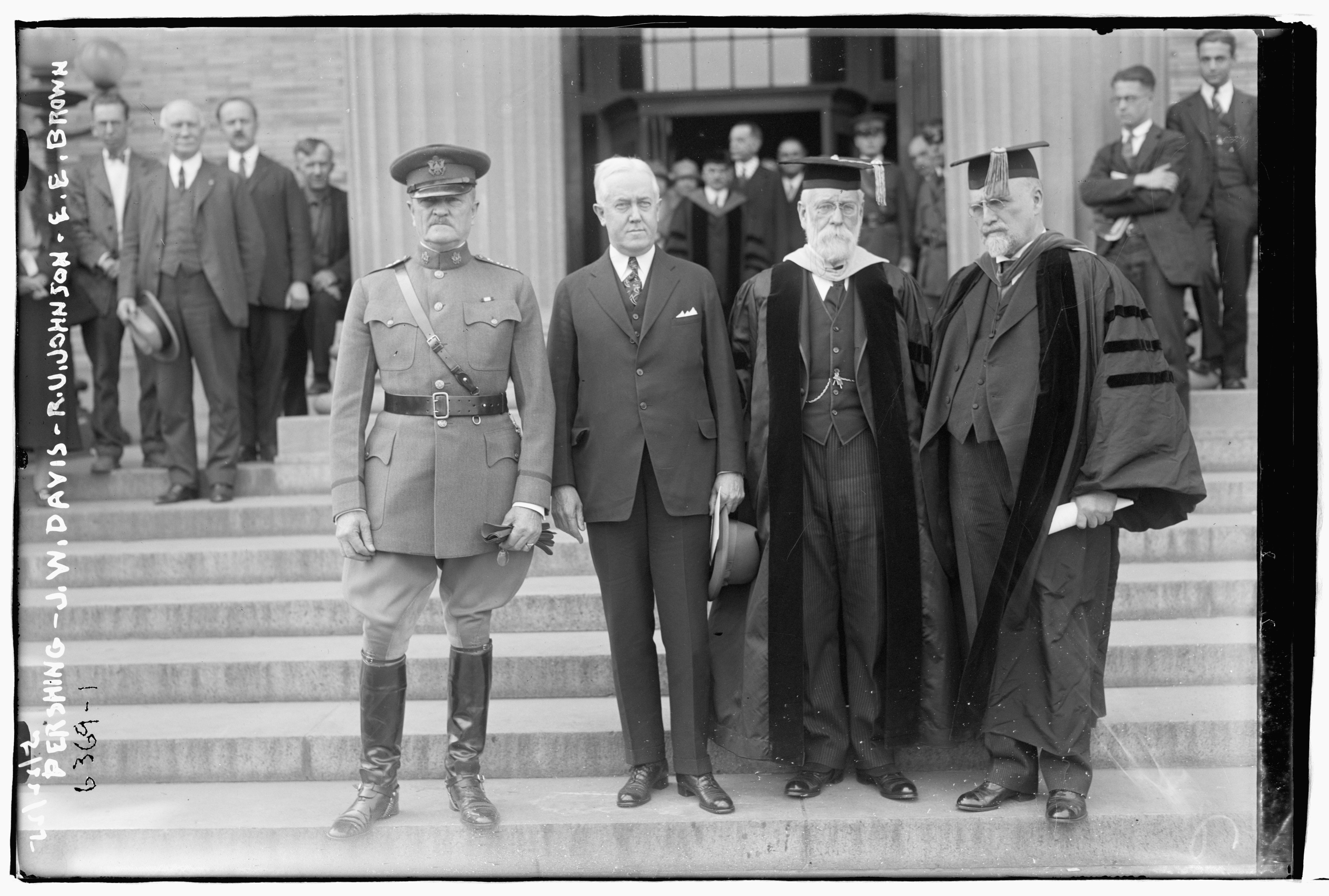
Johnson (third from the left) with John J. Pershing, John W. Davis, and E.E. Brown

As a founding director of the Hall of Fame of New York University, he helped shape its principles "to instill in both Americans and foreigners, and especially in the youth, the principle of patriotism, a healthy conservatism, and reverence for the traditions of high achievement" along with "respect for scholarship and at the best traditions and standards; secondly, maintenance of the dignity and insistence on the value of literature and the arts; and thirdly, realization that its authority must rest on the experience and the achievement of its members." (RY) He became permanent secretary of the American Academy of Arts and Letters, whose formation started in 1899 with Johnson successfully proposing the charter from Congress (1916), the purchase of the Venetian Renaissance home on 155th Street, NYC, and the raising of funds for an endowment noting the indebtedness to the 'finest Spanish scholar in America, Archer M. Huntington' and culminating in 1904 (?). The first members to be inducted by secret ballot of their peers were William Dean Howells, Augustus Saint-Gaudens, Edmund Clarence Stedman, John La Farge, Mark Twain, John Hay and Edward MacDowell. The second group inducted at the first meeting were Henry James, Charles Follen McKim, Henry Adams, Charles Eliot Norton, John Quincy Adams Ward, Thomas Raynesford Lounsbury, Theodore Roosevelt, and Thomas Bailey Aldrich. A core of fifty members was inducted and, in 1908, adopted a constitution.

"The value of a great institution, like the value of a great personality, lies in the potentiality of its influence. Our national ideas need to be firmly established and maintained on an intellectual plane. ... We also need a revival of the gospel that the glory of man is his mind and his soul; and to remember that these, as well as the body, are exposed to starvation and dwarfism and disease and blindness."

• In his book Remembered Yesterdays: "The Temple", Johnson wrote a poem at the laying of the cornerstone of the academy's permanent home. Page 439 is an accounting of the academy's history. John Hay said," An Academy was more needed in our democracy than in an old-world monarchy, which has its own traditions and inherited standards since here we are more subject to the tyranny of vogue."

As Secretary of the American Committee, he was a driving force for the effort to acquire and preserve the Keats-Shelley museum by the Spanish Steps in Rome where the poet John Keats and his friend Joseph Severn spent Keats's final months in 1821. Percy Bysshe Shelley resided temporarily in a home across the steps.

== Ambassador to Italy ==
Johnson served as the U.S. Ambassador to Italy from April 1920 to July 1921 and represented the United States as an observer at the San Remo conference of the Supreme Council of the League. The Italian government decorated him in recognition of his work to promote good relations between Italy and the United States.

In 1916, he was pallbearer for the funeral of Alexander Wilson Drake, director of the Century Magazine art department, and a notable engraver from New Jersey.

Johnson's activities during World War I allowed him to "present the little-known facts of Italy's important contributions to the Allied cause, and that in general, I had written much in prose and verse in admiration of that country and her people." In 1917, he organized and was chairman of the American Poets' Ambulances in Italy. In four months, this organization presented 112 ambulances and 37 field hospitals to the Italian army, built with Ford chassis from Milan. From 1918 to 19, he was president of the New York Committee of the Italian War Relief Fund of America. He raised $235,000, distributed all over Italy "not merely to minister to the suffering but to show Italians everywhere the sympathy and cooperation of America…the blind, prevention or cure of tuberculosis among children of veterans, benevolent work of San Gregorio in Rome." After being shown a photograph of a child holding 'the only doll in the valley', he wrote a poem by that name, sent out a press appeal, and 'hundreds of dolls' were distributed to the Val." He served as the U.S. Ambassador to Italy from April 1920 to July 1921 and represented the United States as an observer at the San Remo conference of the Supreme Council of the League. The Italian government decorated him in recognition of his work for good relations between Italy and the United States.

In his first week on the job, he represented the United States as an observer at the San Remo conference of the Supreme Council of the League (1920.) In his biography, he describes in some detail lamenting the lack of an official record of the proceedings or decisions despite meaningful topics such as Armenia, the status of Constantinople, Yugoslavia, borders and troop positions in Italy, Germany as well as Palestine and the Zionists. "It is amazing how frequently Italy seemed to be in the throes of an inescapable crisis, which, however, passed by like a summer storm – much noise and turmoil but little damage." Informed by his research into the Civil War, he visited the lower Alps battlefields. His duties were largely socially diplomatic but included conversations with American businesses interested in working in Italy, including Charles M. Schwab, and a persistent opposition to Soviet intrusions. A detailed description of the Celebration of Vittorio Veneto – enemy losses topped 500,000. A description of hosting a dinner for the King and Queen of Denmark is rich in description of rituals, atmosphere, and attire. We purchased Zeppelin Roma, and there is an extensive description of two trips. He, and many in the diplomatic corps, operated independently, receiving little operational funding or response to their queries from the US State Department. The Italian government decorated him in recognition of his work for good relations between Italy and the United States.

== Honors ==
For his service in securing international copyright, he received the honorary A.M. degree from Yale University, the decoration of Chevalier in the French Legion of Honor in 1891, and the Cavaliers of the Crown of Italy in 1895. In addition, Johnson was made a commander of the Order of the Crown of Italy in 1919, an officer of the Order of Leopold II (Belgium) in 1919, and the commander of the Order of St. Sava (Serbian) in 1920. He received the Grand Cordon Order of SS. Maurice and Lazarus (Italian), conferred by King Victor Emanuel III in 1921; was named grand officer of the French Legion of Honor in 1922; and received the grand cordon, with star, Order of Polonia Restituta in 1931. A member of Phi Beta Kappa, he was also an organizer in 1904 and permanent secretary of the American Academy of Arts and Letters, an outgrowth of the National Institute of Arts and Letters, of which he had also been secretary. He was a member of the National Citizens Committee of the Third Hague Conference, the Independence Hall Conference to found the League to Enforce Peace, the National Association of American Speech, the Civil Service Reform Association, Sons of the Revolution, and the Authors, MacDowell (honorary), Century and Sierra clubs.

== Writings ==
- with Clarence Clough Buel, Battles and Leaders of the Civil War (1887–88)
- The Winter Hour and Other Poems (New York: The Century, 1892).
- Songs of Liberty and Other Poems (New York: The Century, 1897).
- Poems (New York: The Century, 1902).
- Saint Gaudens: An Ode (New York: The Century Co., third edition, 1910)
- Saint Gaudens: An Ode and Other Poems (Indianapolis and New York: The Bobbs-Merrill Col, fourth edition, 1914)
- Poems of War and Peace (Indianapolis and New York: The Bobbs-Merrill Co., 1916)
- Italian Rhapsody and Other Poems of Italy (Published: By The Author, 745 Fifth Avenue, NY, 1917)
- Collected Poems, 1881–1919 (New Haven: Yale University, 1920).
- "Collected Poems, 1881-1992" (New Haven: Yale University, 1923)
- Remembered Yesterdays (Boston: Little, Brown, 1923).
- Your Hall of Fame: Being an Account of the Origin, Establishment, and History of This Division of New York University, from 1900 to 1935 inclusive (New York: New York University, 1935).
- "Poems of the Longer Flight" (Published: By The Author, 26 East 55th Street, NY, 1928)
- "The Pact and Honor and Other Poems" (Published: By The Author, 1929)
- "Poems of the Lighter Touch" (1930)
- "Poems of Fifty Years" (Published: By The Author, 26 East 55th Street, NY, 1931)
- "Aftermath" (Published: By The Author, NY 745 Fifth Avenue,1933)
- "Heroes, Children and Fun" (Published: By The Author,1934)

Diplomatic posts
Preceded by Thomas Nelson Page	United States Ambassador to Italy; 1920–1921	Succeeded by Richard Washburn Child
