= Frank Weitenkampf =

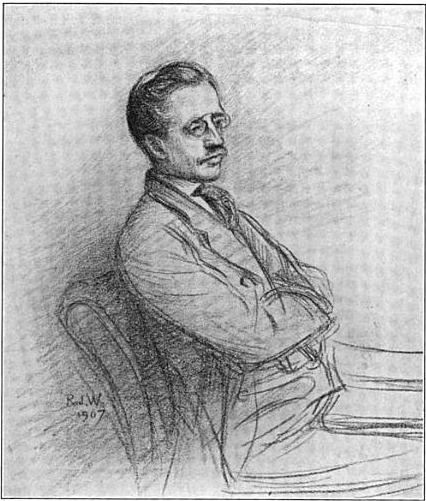
Frank Weitenkampf, 1907

Frank Weitenkampf (13 April 1866 - August 23, 1962) was an American authority on engraving and chief of the art and print departments at the New York Public Library (NYPL), where his papers are archived.

== Biography ==
Weitenkampf was born at 132 Broome Street in New York City, where he studied for two years at the Art Students' League. He worked for the New York Public Library for 61 years, starting in 1881 as a page at the Astor Library, then leading the NYPL Art Department, and finally serving as Curator of Prints from 1921 until his retirement in 1942. At the NYPL, he arranged continuous exhibitions of carefully selected prints, and he also did considerable art propaganda work in disseminating information concerning prints through the press.

Weitenkampf gained recognition as one of the foremost authorities on engraving in the United States. In 1914, New York University gave him the degree of L.H.D. He was also a member of New York's Grolier Club and Andiron Club.

== Selected works ==
Weitenkampf prepared many pamphlets cataloging and describing prints and contributed to various encyclopedias, among them the New International Encyclopedia, and to the Standard Dictionary. Among his other publications are:

- A bibliography of William Hogarth, by Frank Weitenkampf ("Frank Linstow White"), Cambridge, Library of Harvard University, 1890.
- How to appreciate prints, by Frank Weitenkampf, New York, Moffat, Yard & company, 1908.
- How to appreciate prints, by Frank Weitenkampf, London, Grant Richards, 1909.
- American graphic art, by F. Weitenkampf, New York, H. Holt and Company, 1912.
- Wood-engraving to-day, New York Public Library, 1917.
- American graphic art, by F. Weitenkampf, New York, The Macmillan Company, 1924.
- Famous prints, masterpieces of graphic art reproduced from rare originals, with an introduction and critical notes by Frank Weitenkampf, New York, C. Scribner's sons, 1926.
- The illustrated book, by Frank Weitenkampf, Cambridge, Harvard University Press, 1938.
- A century of political cartoons; caricature in the United States from 1800 to 1900, by Allan Nevins and Frank Weitenkampf, New York, C. Scribner's Sons, 1944.
- Manhattan kaleidoscope, New York, C. Scribners Sons; London, C. Scribner's Sons, Ltd., 1947.
