= The Century Company =

American publishing company

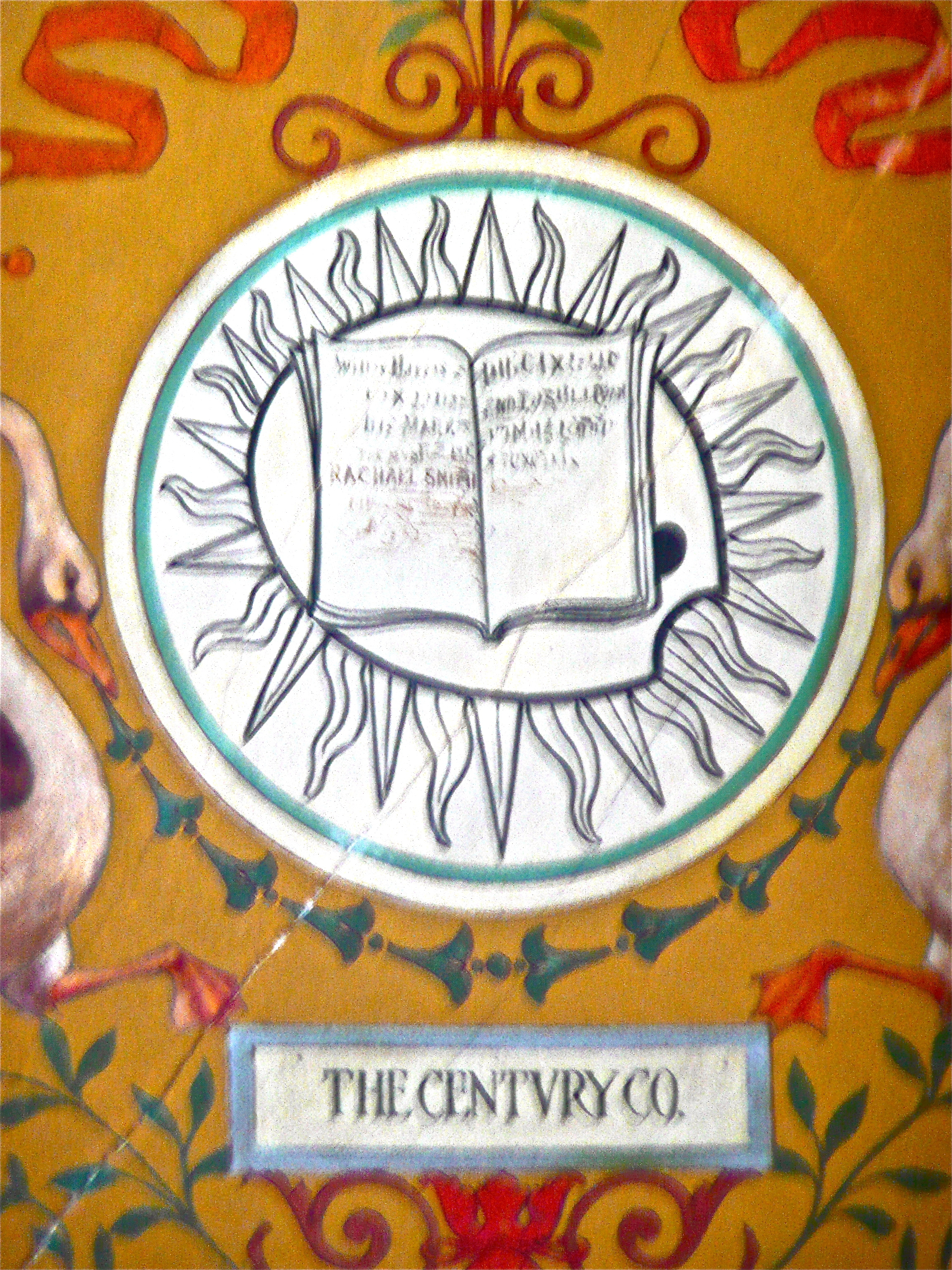
- Founded: 1881
- Defunct: 1933
- Successor: Appleton-Century
- Country of origin: United States
- Headquarters location: New York, New York

The Century Company was an American publishing company, founded in 1881.

== History ==
It began as a subsidiary of Charles Scribner's Sons in 1870, named Scribner and Company, but was bought by Roswell Smith in 1881 and renamed by him after the Century Association. The magazine that the company had published up to that time, Scribner's Monthly, was renamed the Century Illustrated Monthly Magazine.

The Century Company was also the publisher of St. Nicholas Magazine from the time of its founding.

William Morgan Schuster became president of the Century Company of New York City in 1915. In 1933, the Century Company merged with publisher D. Appleton & Company to form Appleton-Century Company, and later merged with F.S. Crofts & Co. to form Appleton-Century-Crofts in 1947. Schuster remained president throughout the mergers, until his retirement in 1952.

Meredith Corporation bought Appleton-Century-Crofts in 1960, and sold its textbook division to Prentice Hall in 1973.

== Imprints ==
- Century Vagabond Books

== See also ==
- Century Dictionary
- Century type family
- Duell, Sloan and Pearce
- Meredith Publishing Company
- Theodore Low De Vinne
