= Virginia =

U.S. state

- State
- Commonwealth of Virginia
- Flag Seal
- Nicknames: Old Dominion, Mother of Presidents
- Motto(s): Sic semper tyrannis (English: Thus Always to Tyrants)
- Anthem: "Our Great Virginia"
- Location of Virginia within the United States
- Country: United States
- Before statehood: Colony of Virginia
- Admitted to the Union: June 25, 1788 (10th)
- Capital: Richmond
- Largest city: Virginia Beach
- Largest county or equivalent: Fairfax County
- Largest metro and urban areas: Washington (metro and urban)

Government
  - Governor: Abigail Spanberger (D)
  - Lieutenant Governor: Ghazala Hashmi (D)
- Legislature: General Assembly
  - Upper house: Senate
  - Lower house: House of Delegates
- Judiciary: Supreme Court of Virginia
- U.S. senators: Mark Warner (D); Tim Kaine (D)
- U.S. House delegation: 6 Democrats; 5 Republicans (list)

Area
  - Total: 42,774.59 sq mi (110,785.67 km^{2})
  - Rank: 35th

Dimensions
  - Length: 430 mi (690 km)
  - Width: 200 mi (320 km)
- Elevation: 950 ft (290 m)
- Highest elevation (Mount Rogers): 5,728 ft (1,746 m)
- Lowest elevation (Atlantic Ocean): 0 ft (0 m)

Population (2025)
  - Total: ▲8,880,107
  - Rank: 12th
  - Density: 219/sq mi (84.7/km^{2})
  - Rank: 15th
  - Median household income: ▲$89,900 (2023)
  - Income rank: 11th
- Demonym: Virginian

Language
  - Official language: English
  - Spoken language: English 86%; Spanish 6%; Other 8%
- Time zone: UTC−05:00 (Eastern)
  - Summer (DST): UTC−04:00 (EDT)
- USPS abbreviation: VA
- ISO 3166 code: US-VA
- Traditional abbreviation: Va.
- Latitude: 36° 32′ N to 39° 28′ N
- Longitude: 75° 15′ W to 83° 41′ W
- Website: virginia.gov

Virginia, officially the Commonwealth of Virginia, (Note: Virginia is one of the four U.S. states that use the term "Commonwealth" in its official name, along with Massachusetts, Kentucky, and Pennsylvania.) is a state in the Southeastern and Mid-Atlantic regions of the United States between the Atlantic Coast and the Appalachian Mountains. It borders Kentucky to the west, Tennessee to the south-west, North Carolina to the south, West Virginia to the north-west, and Maryland to the north. The state's capital is Richmond and its most populous city is Virginia Beach. With a population of 8.8 million, it is the 12th-most populous and 15th-most densely populated state. More than one-third of Virginia's population lives in Northern Virginia, which includes the most populous jurisdiction in the state, Fairfax County.

Eastern Virginia is part of the Atlantic Plain, and the Middle Peninsula forms the mouth of the Chesapeake Bay. Central Virginia lies predominantly in the Piedmont, the foothill region of the Blue Ridge Mountains, which cross the western and southwestern parts of the state. The fertile Shenandoah Valley fosters the state's most productive agricultural counties, while the economy in Northern Virginia is driven by technology companies and U.S. federal government agencies. Hampton Roads is also the site of the region's main seaport and Naval Station Norfolk, the world's largest naval base.

Virginian history begins with several Indigenous nations, some of which were members of the Powhatan Confederacy. In 1607, the London Company established the Colony of Virginia as the first permanent English colony in the New World, leading to Virginia's nickname as the Old Dominion. Slaves from Africa and land from displaced native tribes fueled the growing plantation economy, but also fueled conflicts both inside and outside the colony. Virginians fought for the independence of the Thirteen Colonies in the American Revolution, and helped establish the new national government. During the American Civil War, the state government in Richmond joined the Confederacy, while many northwestern counties remained loyal to the Union, which led to the separation of West Virginia in 1863.

Although the state was under one-party rule for nearly a century following the Reconstruction era, both major political parties have been competitive in Virginia since the repeal of racial segregation laws in the 1960s and 1970s. Virginia's state legislature is the Virginia General Assembly, which was established in July 1619, making it the oldest extant law-making body in North America. Unlike other states, cities and counties in Virginia function as approximate equals, but the state government manages local roads in most counties. It is also the only state where governors are prohibited from serving consecutive terms.

== History ==
=== Earliest inhabitants ===
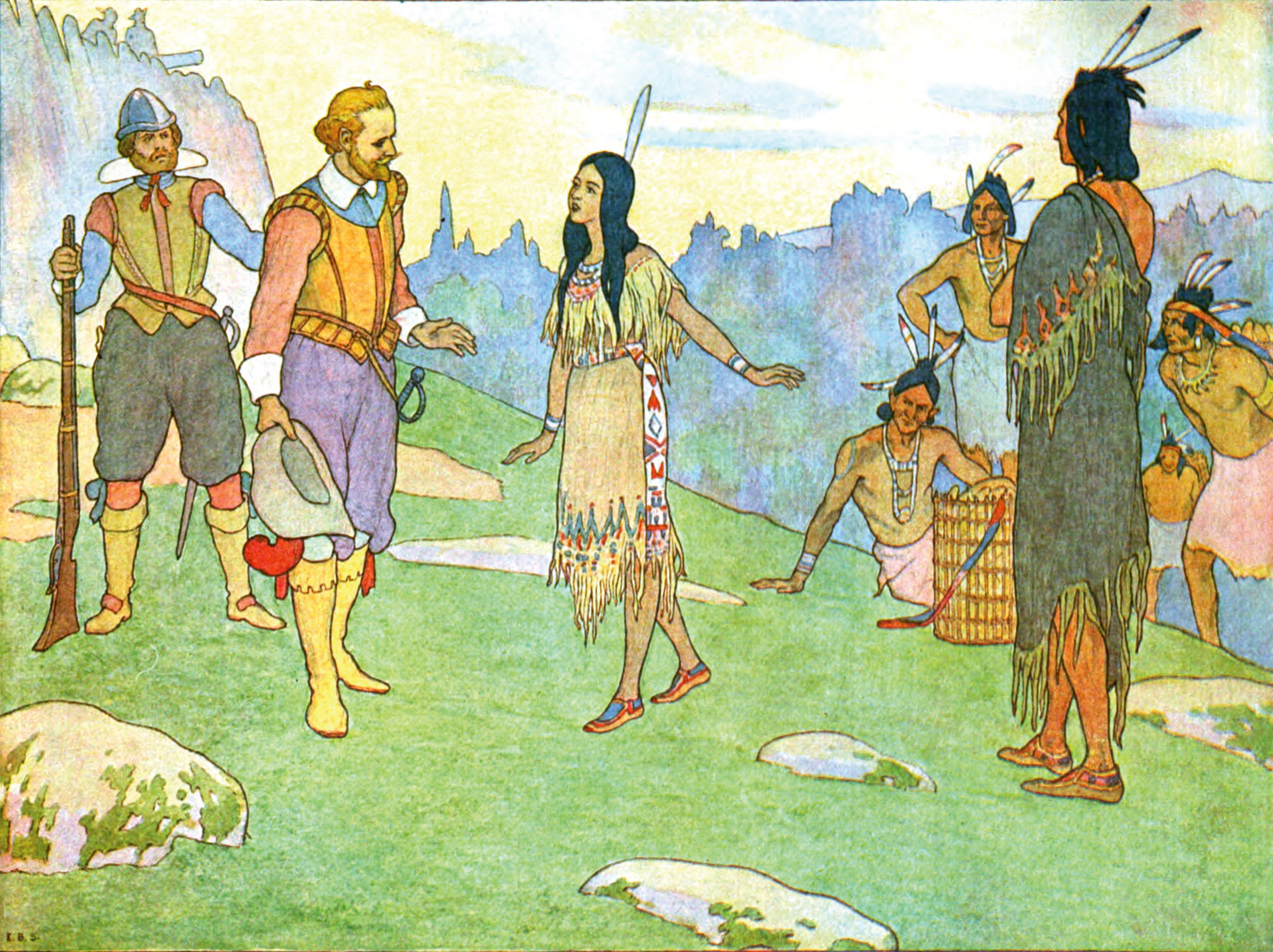
The story of Pocahontas was simplified and romanticized by later artists and authors, including Smith himself, and promoted by her descendants, some of whom married into elite colonial families.

Hunter-gatherers are estimated to have arrived in Virginia around 17,000 years ago. Evidence from Daugherty's Cave shows it was regularly used as a rock shelter by 9,800 years ago. During the late Woodland period (500–1000 AD), farming spread to the region, first corn and squash, then later beans and tobacco arriving from the southwest and Mexico by the end of the period. Palisaded towns began to be built around 1200. The native population in the current boundaries of Virginia reached around 50,000 in the 1500s. Large nations in the area at that time included the tribes of Tsenacommacah such as the Chesapeake, Pamunkey and Chickahominy along the coastline. To their south was the Nottoway and Meherrin with the Tutelo further inland to the west.

In response to threats from these other groups to their trade network, 30 or so Tsenacommacan tribes consolidated under Wahunsenacawh (commonly called Chief Powhatan) starting in the 1570s. The Powhatan Confederacy governed more than 150 settlements that had a total population of around 15,000 in 1607. Three-fourths of the native population in Virginia, however, died from smallpox and other Old World diseases during that century, disrupting their oral traditions and complicating research into earlier periods. Additionally, many primary sources, including those that mention Powhatan's daughter, Pocahontas, were created by Europeans, who may have held biases or misunderstood native social structures and customs.

=== Colony ===
Several European expeditions, including a group of Spanish Jesuits, explored the Chesapeake Bay during the 16th century. To help counter Spain's colonies in the Caribbean, Queen Elizabeth I of England supported Walter Raleigh's 1584 expedition to the Atlantic coast of North America. The name "Virginia" was used by Captain Arthur Barlowe in the expedition's report, and may have been suggested by Raleigh or Elizabeth (perhaps noting her status as the "Virgin Queen" or that they viewed the land as being untouched) or related to an Algonquin phrase, Wingandacoa or Windgancon, or leader's name, Wingina, as heard by the expedition. The name initially applied to the coastal region from South Carolina in the south to Maine in the north, along with the island of Bermuda. Raleigh's colony failed, but the potential financial and strategic gains still captivated many English policymakers. In 1606, King James I issued a charter for a new colony to the Virginia Company of London. The group financed an expedition under Christopher Newport that established a settlement named Jamestown in 1607.

Though more settlers soon joined, many were ill-prepared for the dangers of the new settlement. As the colony's president, John Smith secured food for the colonists from nearby tribes, but after he left in 1609, this trade stopped and a series of ambush-style killings between colonists and natives under Chief Powhatan and his brother began, resulting in mass starvation in the colony that winter. By the end of the colony's first 14 years, over 80% of the roughly eight thousand settlers transported there had died. Demand for exported tobacco, however, fueled the need for more workers. Starting in 1618, the headright system tried to solve this by granting colonists farmland for their help attracting indentured servants. Enslaved Africans were first sold in Virginia in 1619. Though other Africans arrived as indentured servants and could be freed after four to seven years, the basis for lifelong slavery was developed in legal cases like those of John Punch in 1640 and John Casor in 1655. Laws passed in Jamestown defined slavery as race-based in 1661, as inherited maternally in 1662, and as enforceable by death in 1669.

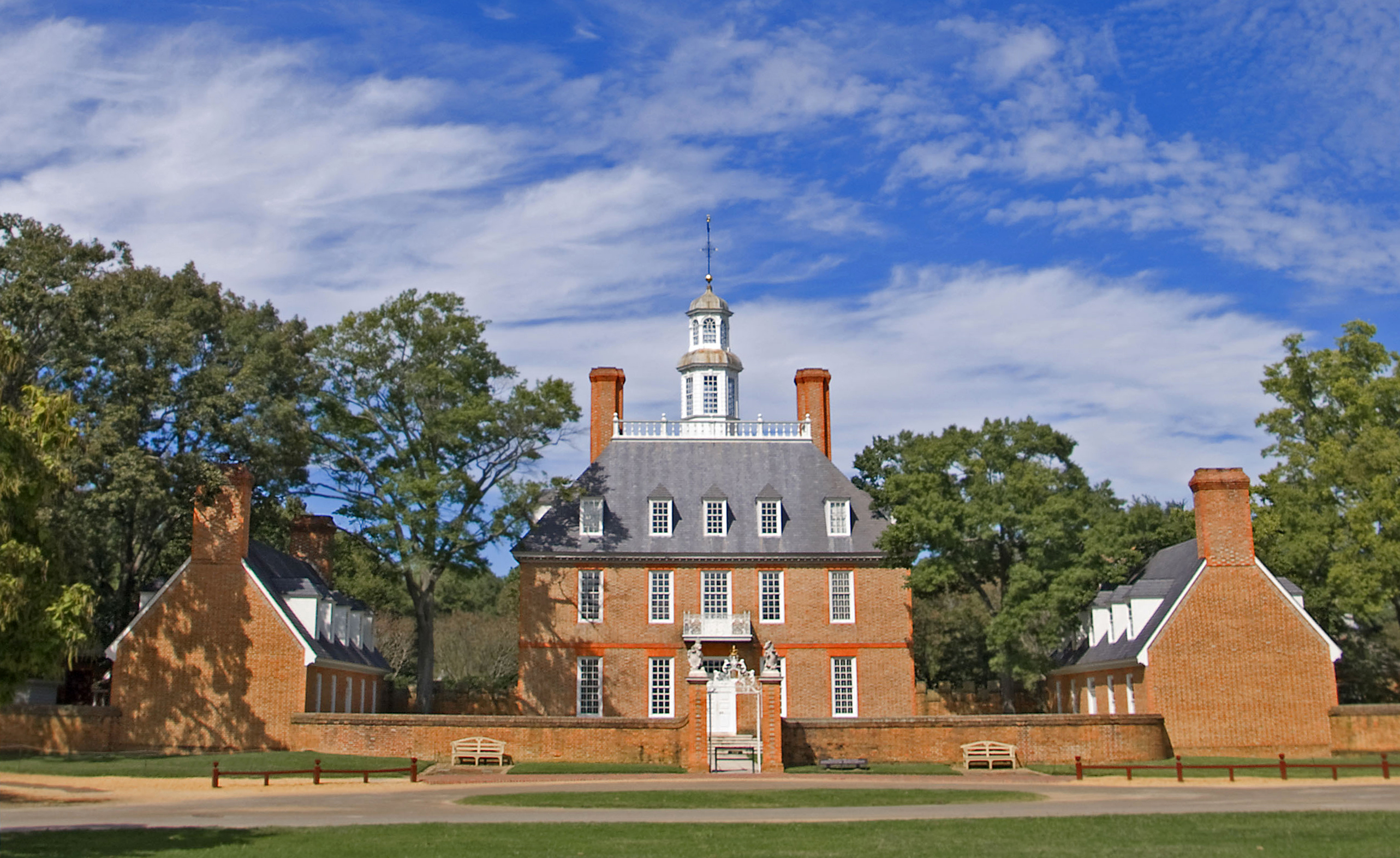
In 1699, after the statehouse in Jamestown was destroyed by fire, the Colony of Virginia's capitol was moved to Williamsburg, where the College of William & Mary was founded six years earlier.

From the colony's start, residents agitated for greater local control, and in 1619, certain male colonists began electing representatives to an assembly, later called the House of Burgesses, that negotiated issues with the governing council appointed by the London Company. Unhappy with this arrangement, the monarchy revoked the company's charter and began directly naming governors and Council members in 1624. In 1635, colonists arrested a governor who ignored the assembly and sent him back to England against his will. William Berkeley was named governor in 1642, just as the turmoil of the English Civil War and Interregnum permitted the colony greater autonomy. As a supporter of the king, Berkeley welcomed other Cavaliers who fled to Virginia. He surrendered to Parliamentarians in 1652, but after the 1660 Restoration made him governor again, he blocked assembly elections and exacerbated the class divide by disenfranchising and restricting the movement of indentured servants, who made up around 80 percent of the workforce. On the colony's frontier, tribes like the Tutelo and Doeg were being squeezed by Seneca raiders from the north, leading to more confrontations with colonists. In 1676, several hundred working-class followers of Nathaniel Bacon, upset by Berkeley's refusal to retaliate against the tribes, burned Jamestown.

Bacon's Rebellion forced the signing of Bacon's Laws, which restored some of the colony's rights and sanctioned both attacks on native tribes and the enslavement of their people. The Treaty of 1677 further reduced the independence of the tribes that signed it, and aided the colony's assimilation of their land in the years that followed. Colonists in the 1700s were pushing westward into the area held by the Seneca and their larger Haudenosaunee Confederacy, and in 1748, a group of wealthy speculators, backed by the British monarchy, formed the Ohio Company to start English settlement and trade in the Ohio Country west of the Appalachian Mountains. France, which claimed this area as part of New France, viewed this as a threat, and in 1754 the French and Indian War engulfed England, France, the Haudenosaunee, and other allied tribes on both sides. A militia from several British colonies, called the Virginia Regiment, was led by Major George Washington, himself one of the investors in the Ohio Company.

=== Statehood ===
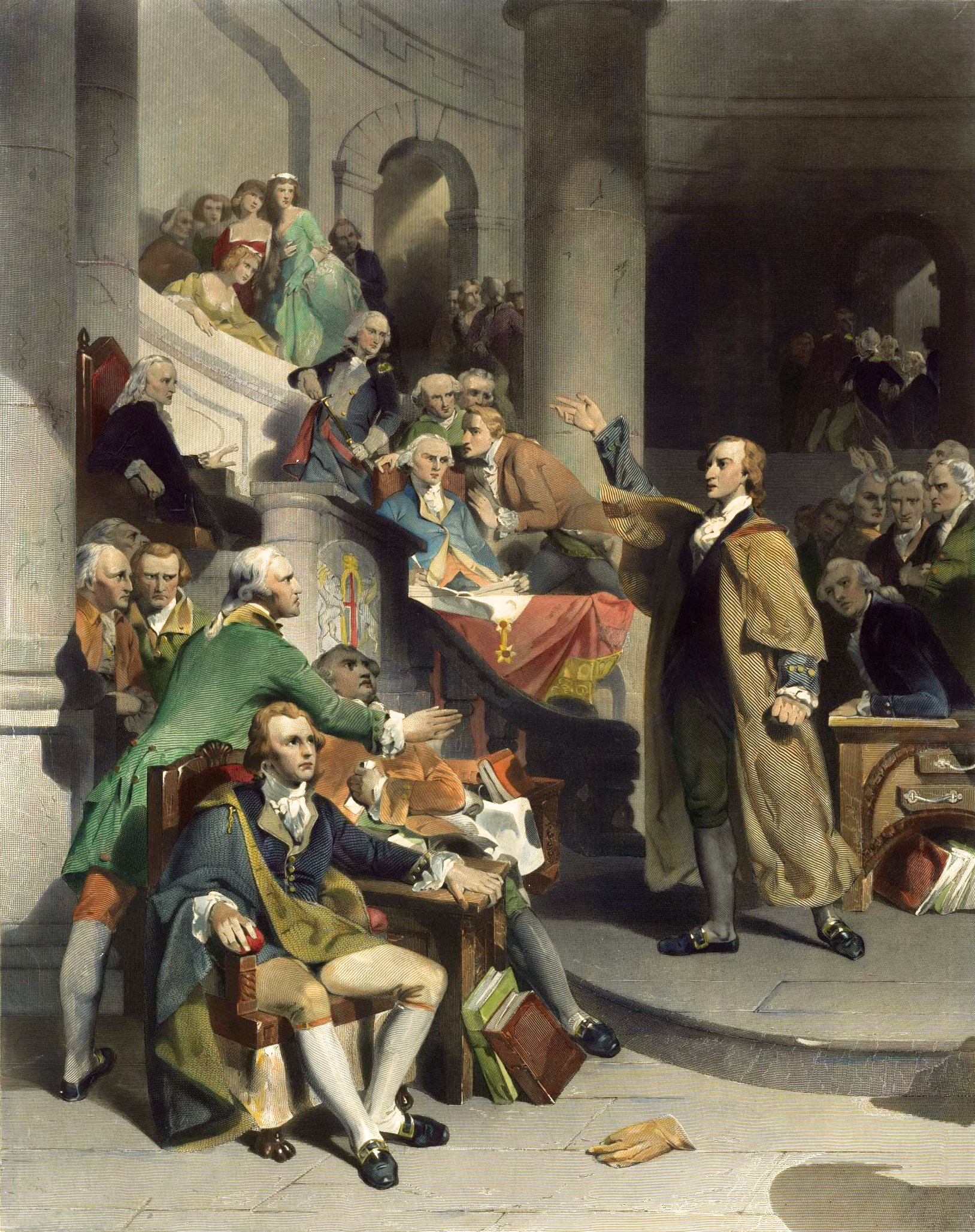
In 1765, Patrick Henry led a protest of the unpopular Stamp Act in the House of Burgesses, later depicted in this portrait by Peter F. Rothermel.

In the decade following the French and Indian War, the British Parliament passed new taxes which were deeply unpopular in the colonies. In the House of Burgesses, opposition to taxation without representation was led by Patrick Henry and Richard Henry Lee, among others. Virginians began to coordinate their actions with other colonies in 1773 and sent delegates to the Continental Congress the following year. After the House of Burgesses was dissolved in 1774 by the royal governor, Virginia's revolutionary leaders continued to govern via the Virginia Conventions. On May 15, 1776, the Convention declared Virginia's independence and adopted George Mason's Virginia Declaration of Rights, which was then included in a new constitution that designated Virginia as a commonwealth. Another Virginian, Thomas Jefferson, drew upon Mason's work in drafting the national Declaration of Independence.

After the American Revolutionary War began, George Washington was selected by the Second Continental Congress in Philadelphia to head the Continental Army, and many Virginians joined the army and revolutionary militias. Virginia was the first colony to ratify the Articles of Confederation in December 1777. In April 1780, the capital was moved to Richmond at the urging of Governor Thomas Jefferson, who feared that Williamsburg's coastal location would make it vulnerable to British attack. In January 1781, Benedict Arnold's British forces raided Richmond before establishing a base at Portsmouth. The British army had over seven thousand soldiers and twenty-five warships stationed in Virginia at the beginning of 1781, but General Charles Cornwallis and his superiors were indecisive, and maneuvers by the three thousand soldiers under the Marquis de Lafayette and twenty-nine allied French warships together managed to confine the British to a swampy area of the Virginia Peninsula in September. Around 16,000 soldiers under George Washington and Comte de Rochambeau quickly converged there and defeated Cornwallis in the siege of Yorktown. His surrender on October 19, 1781, led to peace negotiations in Paris and secured the independence of the colonies.

Virginians were instrumental in writing the United States Constitution. James Madison drafted the Virginia Plan in 1787 and the Bill of Rights in 1789, and Virginia ratified the Constitution on June 25, 1788. The three-fifths compromise ensured that Virginia, with its large number of slaves, initially had the largest bloc in the House of Representatives. Together with the Virginia dynasty of presidents, this gave the Commonwealth national importance. Virginia is called the "Mother of States" because of its role in being carved into states such as Kentucky, and for the numbers of American pioneers born in Virginia.

=== Civil War ===
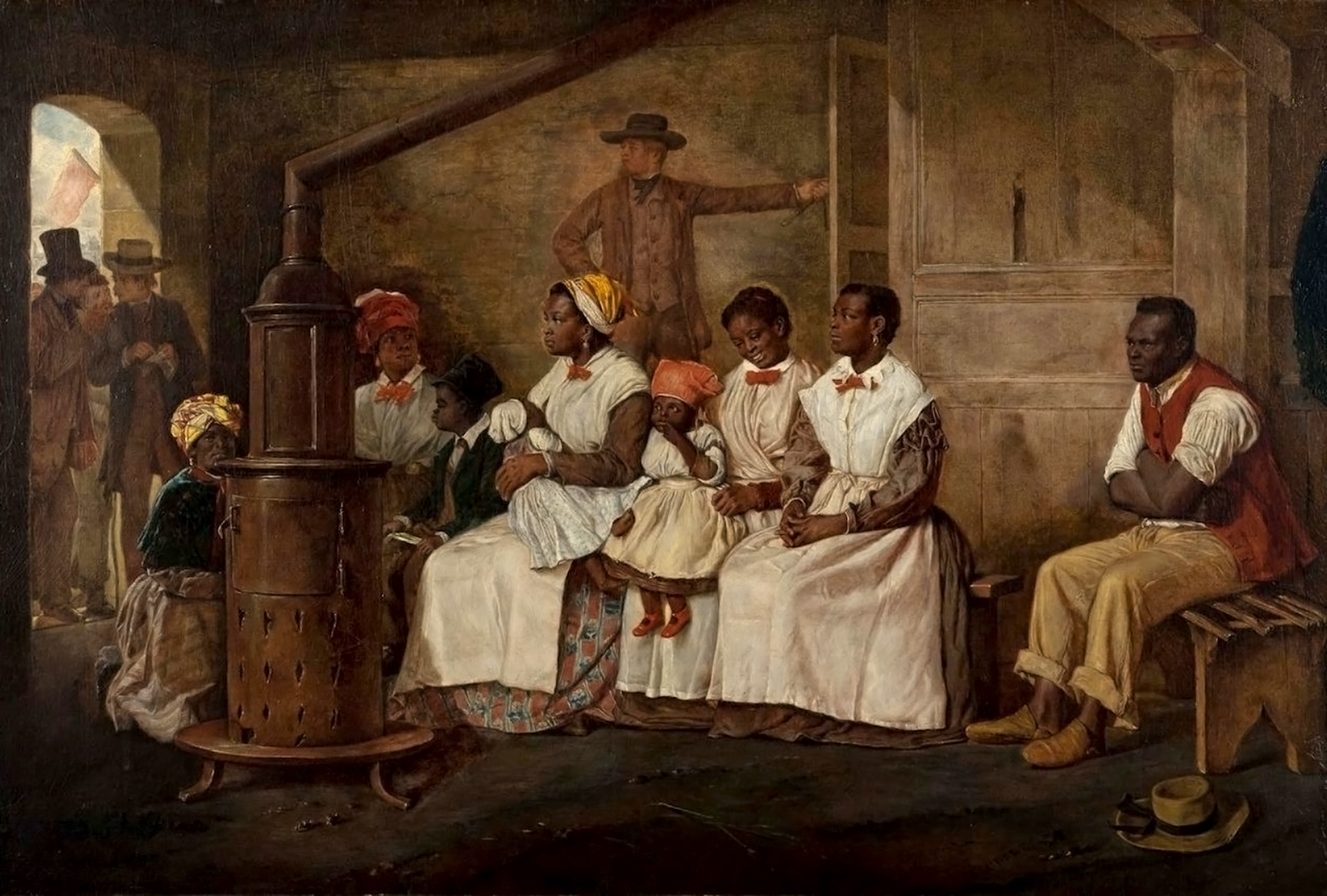
Eyre Crowe's 1853 portrait, Slaves Waiting for Sale: Richmond, Virginia, which he completed after visiting Richmond's slave markets, where thousands were sold annually

Between 1790 and 1860, the number of slaves in Virginia rose from around 290,000 to over 490,000, roughly one-third of the state population, and the number of slave owners rose to over 50,000. Both of these numbers represented the most in the U.S. The boom in Southern cotton production using cotton gins to harvest upland cotton increased the amount of labor needed, but new federal laws prohibited the importation of slaves. Decades of monoculture tobacco farming had also degraded Virginia's agricultural productivity. Virginia plantations increasingly turned to exporting slaves, which broke up countless families and made the breeding of slaves, often through rape, a profitable business. Slaves in the Richmond area were also forced into industrial jobs, including mining and shipbuilding. The failed slave uprisings of Gabriel Prosser in 1800, George Boxley in 1815, and Nat Turner in 1831, however, marked the growing resistance to slavery. Afraid of further uprisings, Virginia's government in the 1830s encouraged Free Blacks to migrate to Liberia.

On October 16, 1859, abolitionist John Brown led a raid on Harpers Ferry, Virginia, in an attempt to start a slave revolt across the southern states. The polarized national response to his raid, capture, trial, and execution that December marked a tipping point for many who believed slavery would need to be ended by force. Abraham Lincoln's 1860 election further convinced many southern supporters of slavery that his opposition to its expansion would ultimately mean the end of slavery across the country. The seizure of Fort Sumter by Confederate forces on April 14, 1861, prompted Lincoln to call for the federalization of 75,000 militiamen.

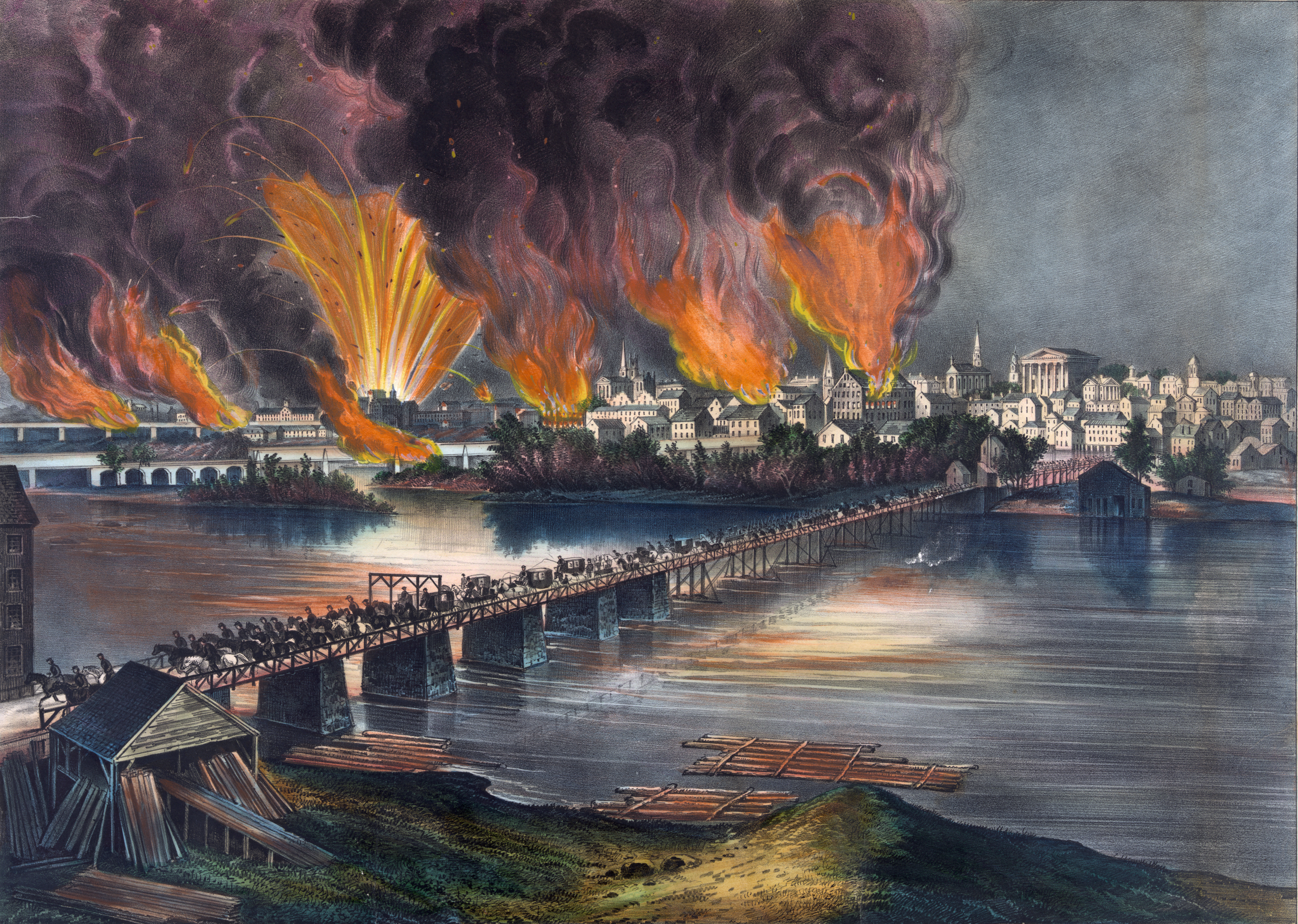
The Confederacy used Richmond as their capital from May 1861 till April 1865, when they abandoned the city and set fire to its downtown.

The Virginia Secession Convention of 1861 voted on April 17 to secede on the condition it was approved in a referendum the next month. The convention voted to join the Confederacy, which named Richmond its capital on May 20. During the May 23 referendum, armed pro-Confederate groups prevented the casting and counting of votes from areas that opposed secession. Representatives from 27 of these northwestern counties instead began the Wheeling Convention, which organized a government loyal to the Union and led to the separation of West Virginia as a new state.

The armies of the Union and Confederacy first met on July 21, 1861, at Bull Run near Manassas, Virginia, a bloody Confederate victory. Union General George B. McClellan organized the Army of the Potomac, which landed on the Virginia Peninsula in March 1862 and reached the outskirts of Richmond that June. With Confederate General Joseph E. Johnston wounded in fighting outside the city, command of his Army of Northern Virginia fell to Robert E. Lee. Over the next month, Lee drove the Union army back, and starting that September led the first of several invasions into Union territory. During the next three years of war, more battles were fought in Virginia than anywhere else, including the battles of Fredericksburg, Chancellorsville, Spotsylvania, and the concluding Battle of Appomattox Court House, where Lee surrendered on April 9, 1865.

=== Reconstruction and segregation ===
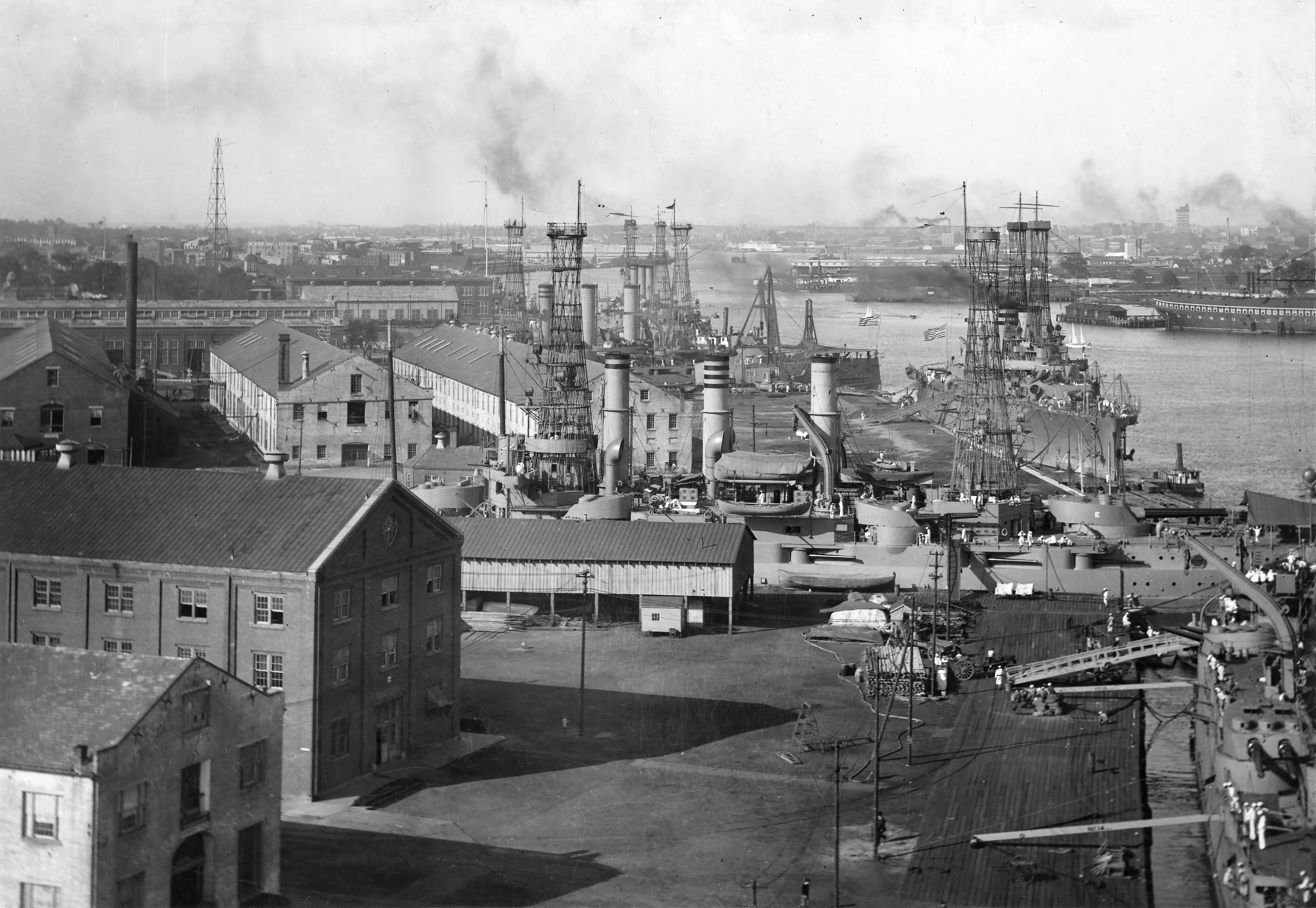
With nearly 800,000 American soldiers passing through its terminals, the Hampton Roads Port of Embarkation at Newport News became the second-largest U.S. port of embarkation during World War I.

Virginia was formally restored to the United States in 1870, due to the work of the Committee of Nine. During the post-war Reconstruction era, African Americans were able to unite in communities, particularly around Richmond, Danville, and the Tidewater region, and take a greater role in Virginia society; many achieved some land ownership during the 1870s. Virginia adopted a constitution in 1868 which guaranteed political, civil, and voting rights, and provided for free public schools. However, with many railroad lines and other infrastructure destroyed during the Civil War, the Commonwealth was deeply in debt, and in the late 1870s redirected money from public schools to pay bondholders. The Readjuster Party formed in 1877 and won legislative power in 1879 by uniting Virginians across racial lines behind a shared opposition to debt payments and the perceived plantation elites.

The Readjusters focused on building up schools, like Virginia Tech and Virginia State, and successfully forced West Virginia to share in the pre-war debt. But in 1883, they were divided by a proposed repeal of anti-miscegenation laws, and days before that year's election, a riot in Danville, involving armed policemen, left five men dead, four of whom were Black. These events motivated a push by white supremacists to seize political power through voter suppression, and segregationists in the Democratic Party won the legislature that year and maintained control for decades. They passed Jim Crow laws that established a racially segregated society, and in 1902 rewrote the state constitution to include a poll tax and other voter registration measures that effectively disenfranchised most African-American and lower-income Virginians.

New economic forces meanwhile industrialized the Commonwealth. Virginian James Albert Bonsack invented the tobacco cigarette rolling machine in 1880 leading to new large-scale production centered around Richmond. Railroad magnate Collis Potter Huntington founded Newport News Shipbuilding in 1886, which was responsible for building 38 warships for the U.S. Navy between 1907 and 1923. During World War I, German submarines attacked ships outside the port, which was a major site for transportation of soldiers and supplies. After the war, a homecoming parade to honor African-American troops was attacked in July 1919 by the city's police as part of a renewed white supremacy movement, known as Red Summer. The shipyard continued building warships in World War II, and quadrupled its pre-war labor force to 70,000 by 1943. The Radford Arsenal outside Blacksburg also employed 22,000 workers making explosives, while the Torpedo Factory in Alexandria had over 5,050.

=== Civil rights to present ===
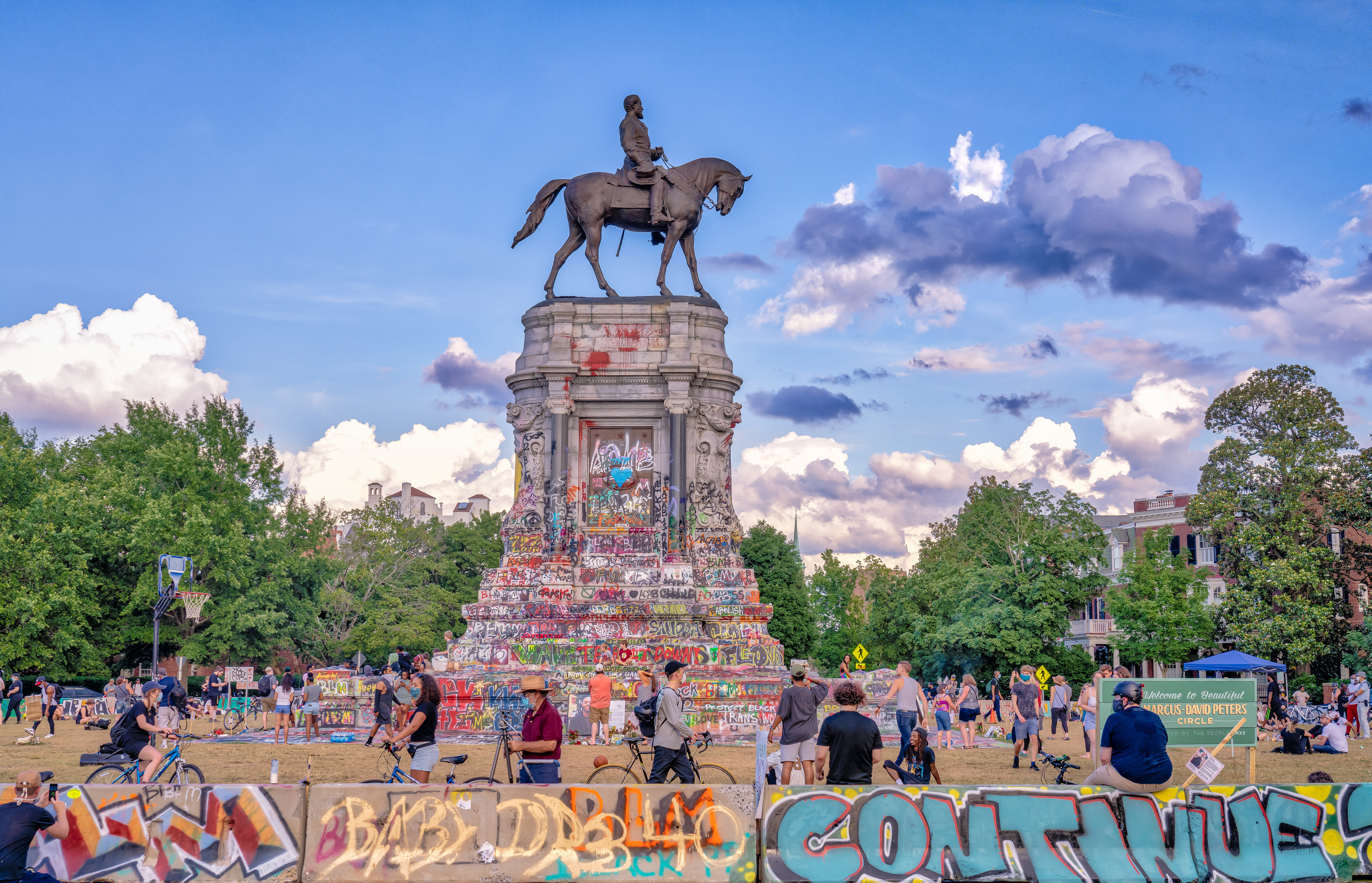
Protests in 2020 focused on Confederate monuments in the state.

High-school student Barbara Rose Johns started a strike in 1951 at her underfunded and segregated school in Prince Edward County. The protests led Spottswood Robinson and Oliver Hill to file a lawsuit against the county. Their case joined Brown v. Board of Education at the Supreme Court, which rejected the doctrine of "separate but equal" in 1954. The segregationist establishment, led by Senator Harry F. Byrd and his Byrd Organization, reacted with a strategy called "massive resistance", and the General Assembly passed a package of laws in 1956 that cut off funding to local schools that desegregated, causing some to close. Courts ruled the strategy unconstitutional, and on February 2, 1959, Black students integrated schools in Arlington and Norfolk, where they were known as the Norfolk 17. Rather than integrate, county leaders in Prince Edward shut their school system in June 1959. When litigation again reached the Supreme Court, it ordered the county to reopen and integrate its schools, which finally happened in September 1964.

Federal passage of the Civil Rights Act (1964) and Voting Rights Act (1965), and their later enforcement by the Justice Department, helped end racial segregation in Virginia and overturn Jim Crow laws. In 1967, the Supreme Court struck down the state's ban on interracial marriage with Loving v. Virginia. In 1968, Governor Mills Godwin called a commission to rewrite the state constitution. The new constitution, which banned discrimination and removed articles that now violated federal law, passed in a referendum and went into effect in 1971. In 1989, Douglas Wilder became the first African American elected as governor in the United States, and in 1992, Bobby Scott became the first Black congressman from Virginia since 1888.

The expansion of federal government offices into Northern Virginia's suburbs during the Cold War boosted the region's population and economy. The Central Intelligence Agency outgrew their offices in Foggy Bottom during the Korean War, and moved to Langley in 1961, in part due to a decision by the National Security Council that the agency relocate outside the District of Columbia. The Pentagon, built in Arlington during World War II as the headquarters of the Department of Defense, was struck by a hijacked plane in the September 11, 2001 attacks. Mass shootings at Virginia Tech in 2007 and in Virginia Beach in 2019 led to passage of gun control measures in 2020. Racial injustice and the presence of Confederate monuments in Virginia have also led to large demonstrations, including in August 2017, when a white supremacist drove his car into protesters, killing one, and in June 2020, when protests that were part of the larger Black Lives Matter movement brought about the removal of Confederate statues.

== Geography ==
Virginia is shaped by the Blue Ridge Mountains, the Chesapeake Bay and its watershed, and the parallel 36°30′ north.

Virginia is located in the Mid-Atlantic and Southeastern regions of the United States. Virginia has a total area of 42,774.2 square miles (110,784.7 km^{2}), including 3,180.13 square miles (8,236.5 km^{2}) of water, making it the 35th-largest state by area. It is bordered by Maryland and Washington, D.C. to the northeast; by the Atlantic Ocean to the east; by North Carolina to the south; by Tennessee to the southwest; by Kentucky to the west; and by West Virginia to the northwest. Virginia's boundary with Maryland and Washington, D.C., the low-water mark of the south shore of the Potomac River, has been an issue for water rights.

Virginia's southern border was defined in 1665 as 36°30' north latitude. Surveyors marking the border with North Carolina in the 18th century however started about 3.5 miles (5.6 km) to the north and drifted an additional 3.5 miles by the border's westernmost point. After Tennessee joined the U.S. in 1796, new surveyors worked in 1802 and 1803 to reset their border with Virginia as a line from the summit of White Top Mountain to the top of Tri-State Peak in the Cumberland Mountains. However, deviations in that border were identified when it was re-marked in 1856, and the Virginia General Assembly proposed a new surveying commission in 1871. Representatives from Tennessee preferred to keep the less-straight 1803 line, and in 1893, the U.S. Supreme Court ruled for them against Virginia. One result is how the city of Bristol is divided in two between the states.

=== Geology and terrain ===
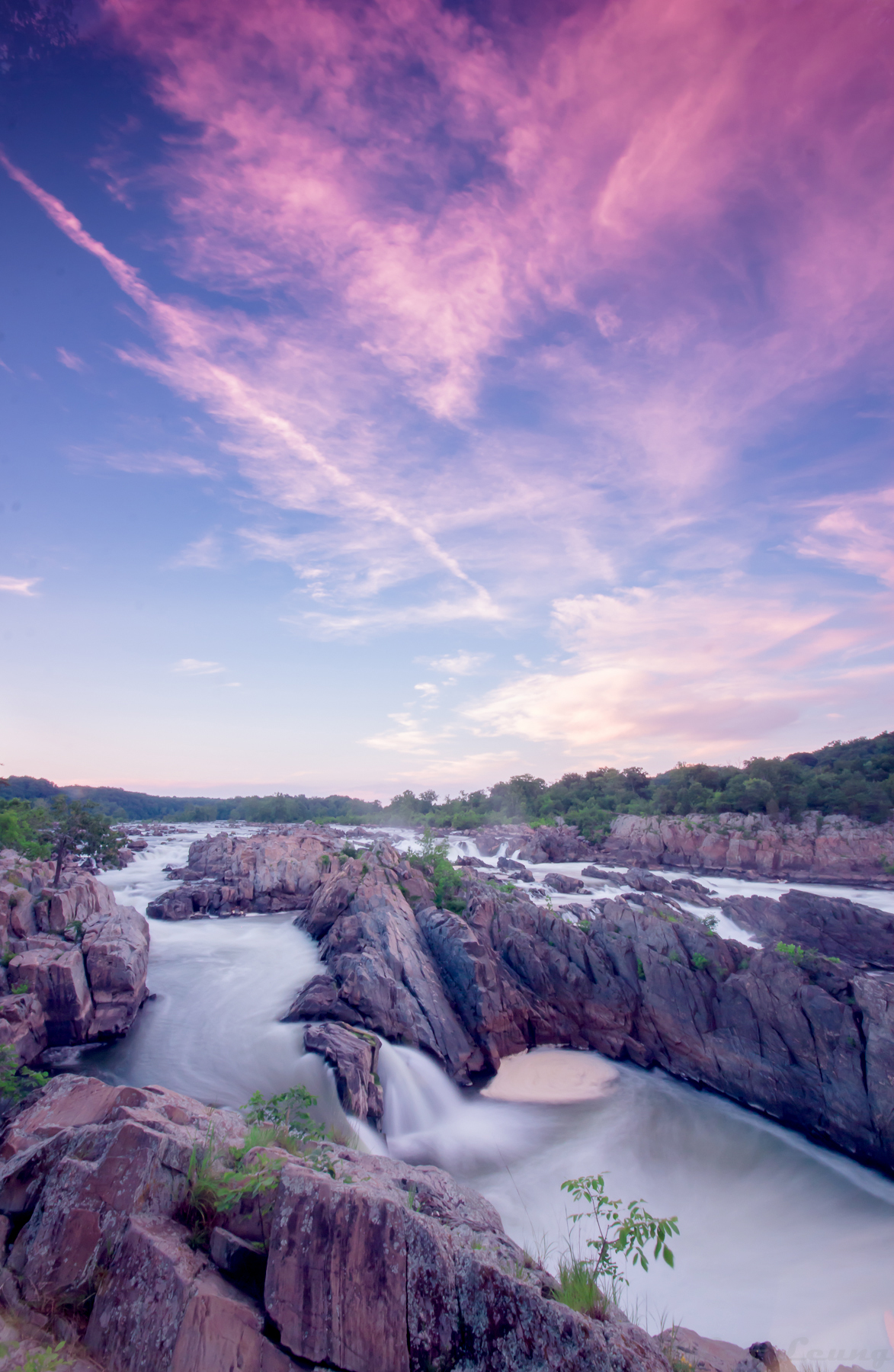
Great Falls is on the fall line of the Potomac River, and its rocks date to the late Precambrian.

The Chesapeake Bay separates the contiguous portion of the Commonwealth from the two-county peninsula of Virginia's Eastern Shore. The bay was formed from the drowned river valley of the ancient Susquehanna River. Many of Virginia's rivers flow into the Chesapeake Bay, including the Potomac, Rappahannock, York, and James, which create three peninsulas in the bay, traditionally referred to as "necks" named Northern Neck, Middle Peninsula, and the Virginia Peninsula from north to south. Sea level rise has eroded the land on Virginia's islands, which include Tangier Island in the bay and Chincoteague, one of 23 barrier islands on the Atlantic coast.

The Tidewater is a coastal plain between the Atlantic coast and the fall line. It includes the Eastern Shore and major estuaries of Chesapeake Bay. The Piedmont is a series of sedimentary and igneous rock-based foothills east of the mountains. The region, known for its heavy clay soil, includes the Southwest Mountains around Charlottesville. The Blue Ridge Mountains are a physiographic province of the Appalachian Mountains with the highest points in the Commonwealth, the tallest being Mount Rogers at 5,729 feet (1,746 m). The Ridge-and-Valley region is west of the mountains, carbonate rock based, and includes the Massanutten Mountain ridge and the Great Appalachian Valley, which is called the Shenandoah Valley in Virginia, named after the river of the same name that flows through it. The Cumberland Plateau and Cumberland Mountains are in the southwest corner of Virginia, south of the Allegheny Plateau. In this region, rivers flow northwest into the Ohio River basin.

Virginia's seismic zones have not had a history of regular earthquake activity. Earthquakes are rarely above 4.5 in magnitude. The Commonwealth's largest earthquake in at least a century, at a magnitude of 5.8, struck central Virginia on August 23, 2011. 35 million years ago, a bolide impacted what is now eastern Virginia. The resulting Chesapeake Bay impact crater may explain what earthquakes and subsidence the region does experience. A meteor impact is also theorized as the source of Lake Drummond, the largest of the two natural lakes in the state.

The Commonwealth's carbonate rock is filled with more than 4,000 limestone caves, ten of which are open for tourism, including the popular Luray Caverns and Skyline Caverns. Virginia's iconic Natural Bridge is the remaining roof of a collapsed limestone cave. Coal mining takes place in the three mountainous regions. More than 72 million tons of other non-fuel resources, such as slate, kyanite, sand, and gravel, were mined in Virginia in 2020. The largest known deposits of uranium in the U.S. are under Coles Hill, Virginia. Despite a challenge that reached the U.S. Supreme Court twice, the state has banned its mining since 1982 due to environmental and public health concerns.

=== Climate ===
Virginia state-wide averages 1895–2023

Climate chart (precipitation, max. and min. temperature)
J	F	M	A	M	J	J	A	S	O	N	D
3.3 45 25	3.1 48 26	3.7 56 34	3.4 67 42	4 76 51	4.1 82 60	4.6 86 64	4.3 84 63	3.7 79 56	3.2 68 45	2.9 57 35	3.3 47 27
- █ Average max. and min. temperatures in °F
- █ Precipitation totals in inches
- Source: U.S. Climate Divisional Dataset
Metric conversion
J	F	M	A	M	J	J	A	S	O	N	D
84 7 −4	79 9 −3	94 14 1	86 19 6	102 24 11	104 28 15	117 30 18	109 29 17	94 26 14	81 20 7	74 14 1	84 8 −3
- █ Average max. and min. temperatures in °C
- █ Precipitation totals in mm

Virginia has a humid subtropical climate that transitions to humid continental west of the Blue Ridge Mountains. Seasonal extremes vary from average lows of 25 °F (−4 °C) in January to average highs of 86 °F (30 °C) in July. The Atlantic Ocean and Gulf Stream have a strong effect on eastern and southeastern coastal areas, making the climate there warmer but also more constant. Most of Virginia's recorded extremes in temperature and precipitation have occurred in the Blue Ridge Mountains and areas west. Virginia receives an average of 43.47 inches (110 cm) of precipitation annually, with the Shenandoah Valley being the state's driest region.

Virginia has around 35–45 days with thunderstorms annually, and storms are common in the late afternoon and evenings between April and September. These months are also the most common for tornadoes, six of which touched down in the Commonwealth in 2025. Hurricanes and tropical storms can occur from August to October. The deadliest natural disaster in Virginia was Hurricane Camille, which killed over 150 people in 1969 mainly in inland Nelson County. Between December and March, cold-air damming caused by the Appalachian Mountains can lead to significant snowfalls across the state, such as the January 2016 blizzard, which created the state's highest recorded one-day snowfall of 36.6 inches (93 cm) near Bluemont. On average, cities in Virginia can receive between 5.8–12.3 inches (15–31 cm) of snow annually, but recent winters have seen below-average snowfalls, and much of Virginia had no measurable snow during the 2022–2023 winter season.

Climate change in Virginia is leading to higher temperatures year-round as well as more heavy rain and flooding events. Urban heat islands can be found in many Virginia cities and suburbs, particularly in neighborhoods linked to historic redlining. The air in Virginia has statistically improved since 1998. The closure and conversion of coal power plants in Virginia and the Ohio Valley region has helped cut the amount of particulate matter in Virginia's air in half. Current plans call for 30% of the Commonwealth's electricity to be renewable by 2030 and for all to be carbon-free by 2050.

=== Ecosystem ===
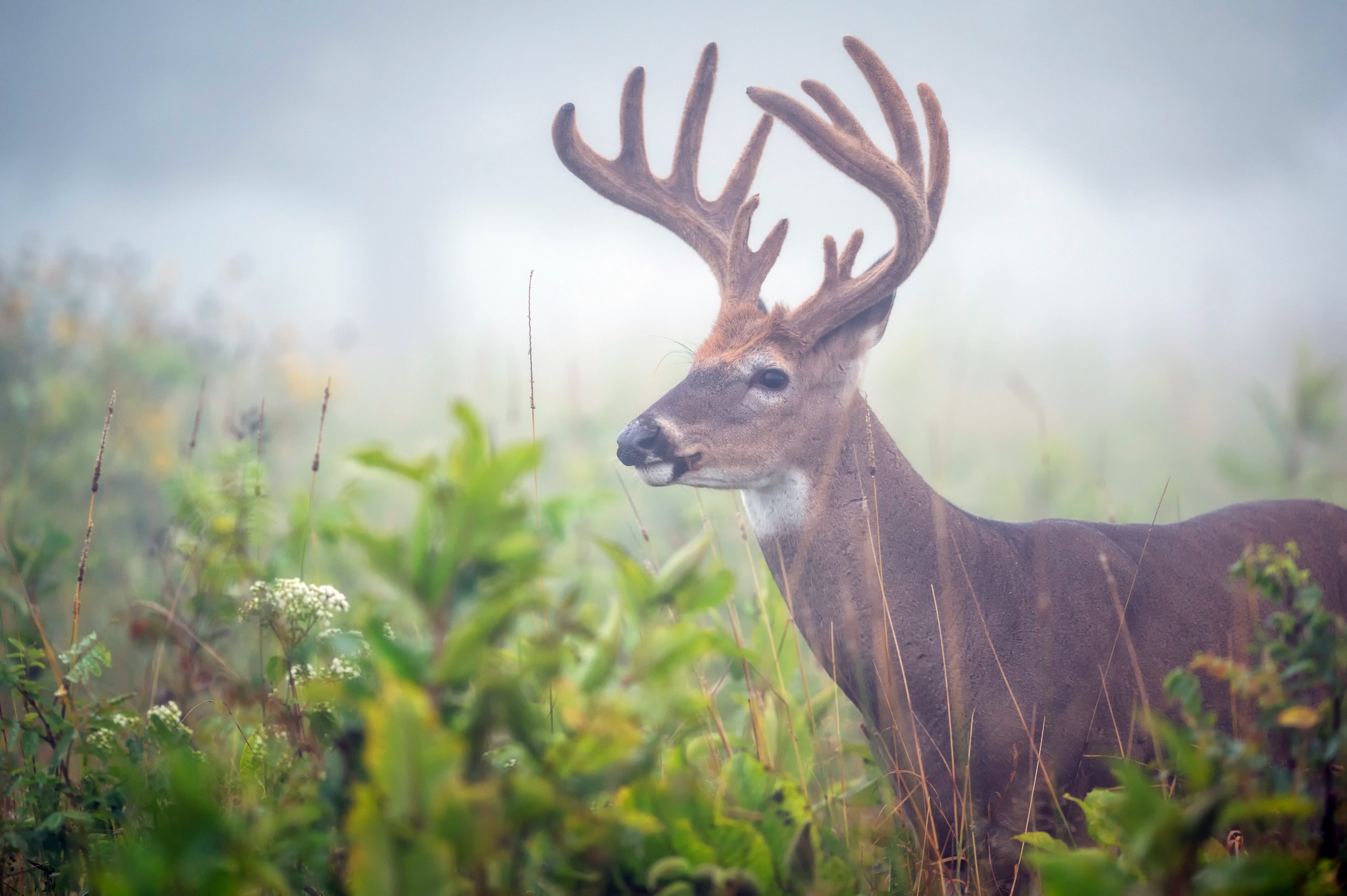
Up to 7,000 white-tailed deer, also known as Virginia deer, live in Shenandoah National Park.

Forests cover 62% of Virginia as of 2021, of which 80% is considered hardwood forest, meaning that trees are primarily deciduous and broad-leaved. The other 20% is pine, with loblolly and shortleaf pine dominating much of central and eastern Virginia. In the western and mountainous parts of the Commonwealth, oak and hickory are most common, while lower altitudes are more likely to have small but dense stands of hemlocks and mosses in abundance. Spongy moth infestations in oak trees and the blight in chestnut trees have decreased both of their numbers, leaving more room for hickory and the invasive tree of heaven. In the lowland tidewater and Piedmont, yellow pines tend to dominate, with bald cypress wetland forests in the Great Dismal and Nottoway swamps. Other common trees include red spruce, Atlantic white cedar, tulip-poplar, and the flowering dogwood, the state tree and flower. Plants like milkweed, dandelions, daisies, ferns, and Virginia creeper, which is featured on the state flag, are also common. The Thompson Wildlife Area in Fauquier is known for having one of the largest populations of trillium wildflowers in North America.

White-tailed deer, one of 75 mammal species found in Virginia, rebounded from an estimated population of as few as 25,000 in the 1930s to over one million by the 2010s. Native carnivorans include black bears, who have a population of around five to six thousand in the state, as well as bobcats, coyotes, both gray and red foxes, raccoons, weasels and skunks. Rodents include groundhogs, nutria, beavers, both gray squirrels and fox squirrels, chipmunks, and Allegheny woodrats, while the 17 bat species include brown bats and the Virginia big-eared bat, the state mammal. The Virginia opossum is the only marsupial native to the United States and Canada, and the native Appalachian cottontail was recognized in 1992 as a distinct species of rabbit, one of three found in the state. Whales, dolphins, and porpoises have been recorded in Virginia's coastal waters, with bottlenose dolphins being the most frequent aquatic mammals.

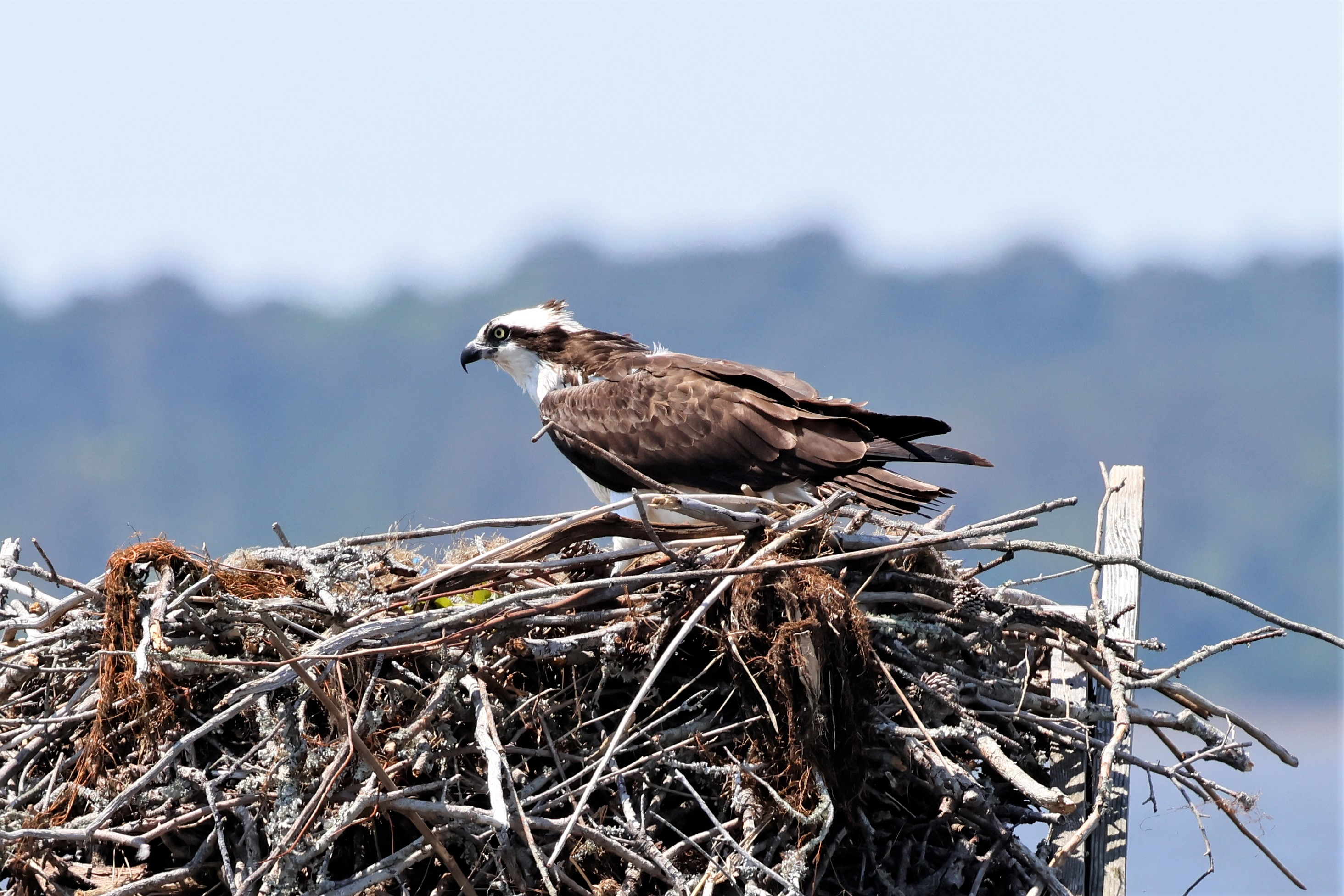
Osprey nest at False Cape State Park on a wooden platform designed to encourage their return to the area

Virginia's bird fauna comprises 422 counted species, of which 359 are regularly occurring and 214 have bred in Virginia, while the rest are mostly winter residents or transients. Water birds include sandpipers, wood ducks, and Virginia rail, while common inland examples include warblers, woodpeckers, and cardinals, the state bird. Birds of prey include osprey, broad-winged hawks, and barred owls. There are no endemic bird species. Audubon recognizes 21 Important Bird Areas in the state. Peregrine falcons, whose numbers dramatically declined due to DDT poisoning in the middle of the 20th century, are the focus of conservation efforts in the state and a reintroduction program in Shenandoah National Park.

Virginia has 226 species of freshwater fish from 25 families, a diversity attributable to the area's varied and humid climate, topography, interconnected river system, and lack of Pleistocene glaciers. Common examples on the Cumberland Plateau and higher-elevation regions include Eastern blacknose dace, sculpin, smallmouth bass, redhorse sucker, Kanawha darter, and brook trout, the state fish. Downhill in the Piedmont, stripeback darter and Roanoke bass become common, as do swampfish, bluespotted sunfish, and pirate perch in the Tidewater. The Chesapeake Bay hosts clams, oysters, and 350 species of saltwater and estuarine fish, including the bay's most abundant finfish, the Bay anchovy, as well as the invasive blue catfish. An estimated 238 million Chesapeake blue crabs live in the bay as of 2025. There are 34 native species of crayfish, like the Big Sandy. Amphibians found in Virginia include the Cumberland Plateau salamander and Eastern hellbender, while the northern watersnake is the most common of the 32 snake species.

=== Protected lands ===
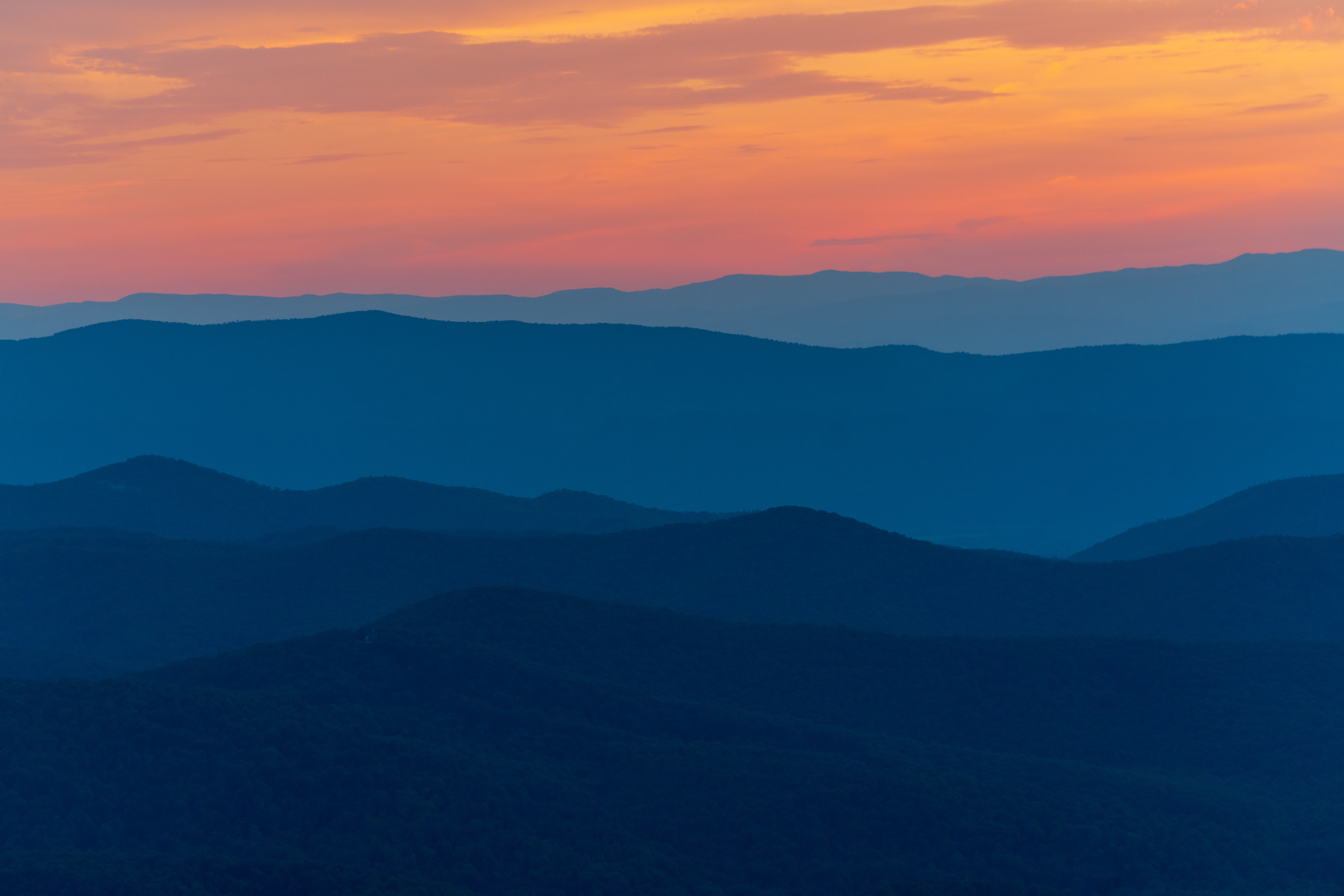
Oak trees produce a haze of isoprene, which helps give the Blue Ridge Mountains their signature color.

As of 2024, roughly 17.1% of land in the Commonwealth is protected by federal, state, and local governments and non-profits. Federal lands account for the majority, with 30 National Park Service units, such as Great Falls Park and the Appalachian Trail, and one national park, Shenandoah. Almost 40 percent of Shenandoah's total 199,173 acres (806 km^{2}) area has been designated as wilderness under the National Wilderness Preservation System. The U.S. Forest Service administers the George Washington and Jefferson National Forests, which cover more than 1.6 million acres (6,500 km^{2}) within Virginia's mountains, and continue into West Virginia and Kentucky. The Great Dismal Swamp National Wildlife Refuge also extends into North Carolina, as does the Back Bay National Wildlife Refuge, which marks the beginning of the Outer Banks.

State agencies control about one-third of protected land in the state, and the Virginia Department of Conservation and Recreation manages over 75,900 acres (307.2 km^{2}) in 40 Virginia state parks and 59,222 acres (239.7 km^{2}) in 65 Natural Area Preserves, plus three undeveloped parks. Breaks Interstate Park crosses the Kentucky border and is one of only two inter-state parks in the United States. Sustainable logging is allowed in 26 state forests managed by the Virginia Department of Forestry totaling 71,972 acres (291.3 km^{2}), as is hunting in 44 Wildlife Management Areas run by the Virginia Department of Wildlife Resources covering over 205,000 acres (829.6 km^{2}). The Chesapeake Bay is not a national park, but is protected by both state and federal legislation and the inter-state Chesapeake Bay Program.

=== Cities and towns ===
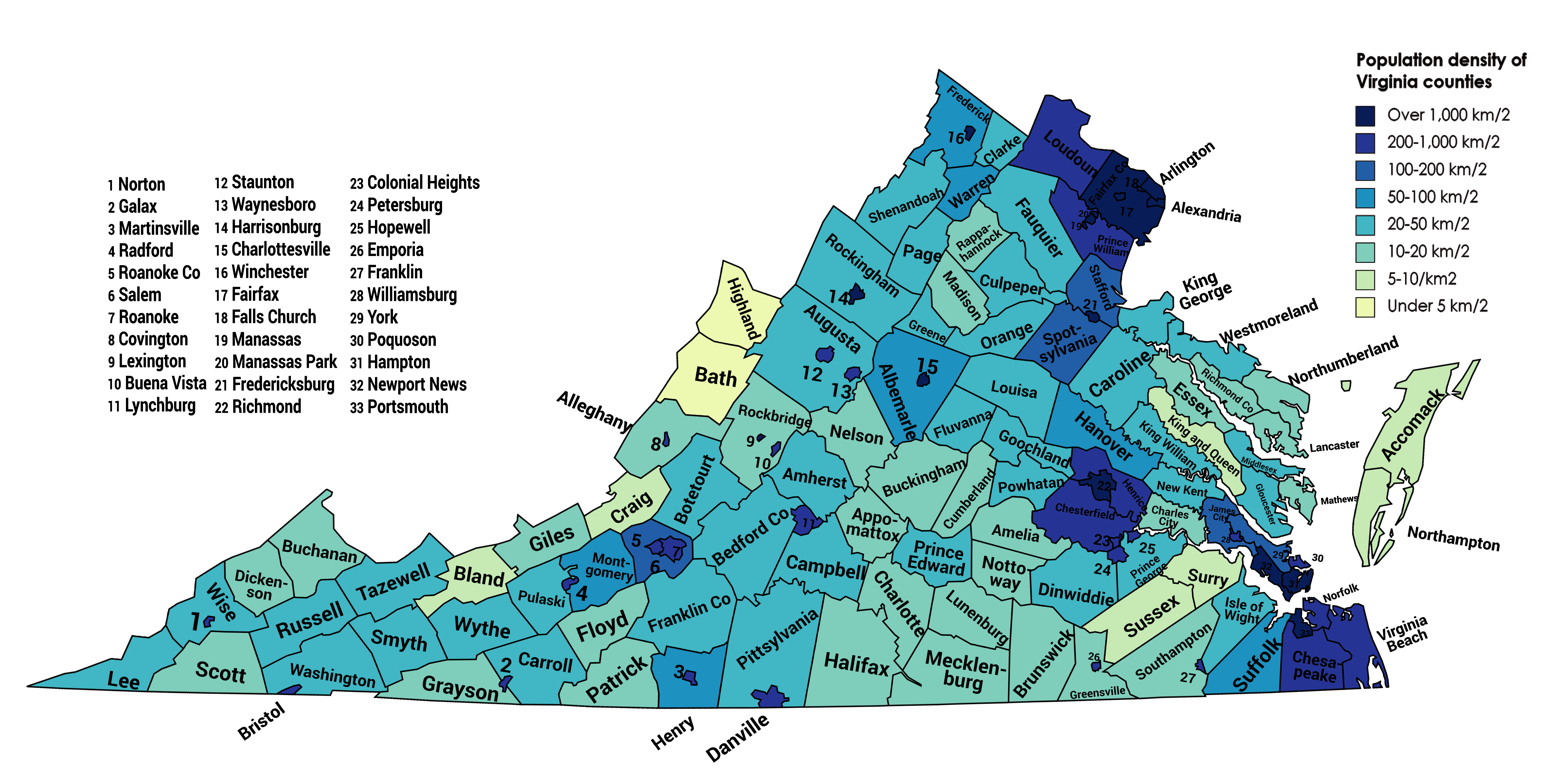
The population density of Virginia counties and cities as of 2020

Virginia is divided into 95 counties and 38 independent cities, which the U.S. Census Bureau describes as county-equivalents. This general method of treating cities and counties on par with each other is unique to Virginia and stretches back to the influence of Williamsburg and Norfolk in the colonial period. Only three other independent cities exist elsewhere in the US. The differences between counties and cities in Virginia are small and have to do with how each assess new taxes, whether a referendum is necessary to issue bonds, and with the application of Dillon's Rule, which limits the authority of cities and counties to countermand acts expressly allowed by the General Assembly. Counties can also have incorporated towns, and while there are no further administrative subdivisions, the Census Bureau recognizes several hundred unincorporated communities.

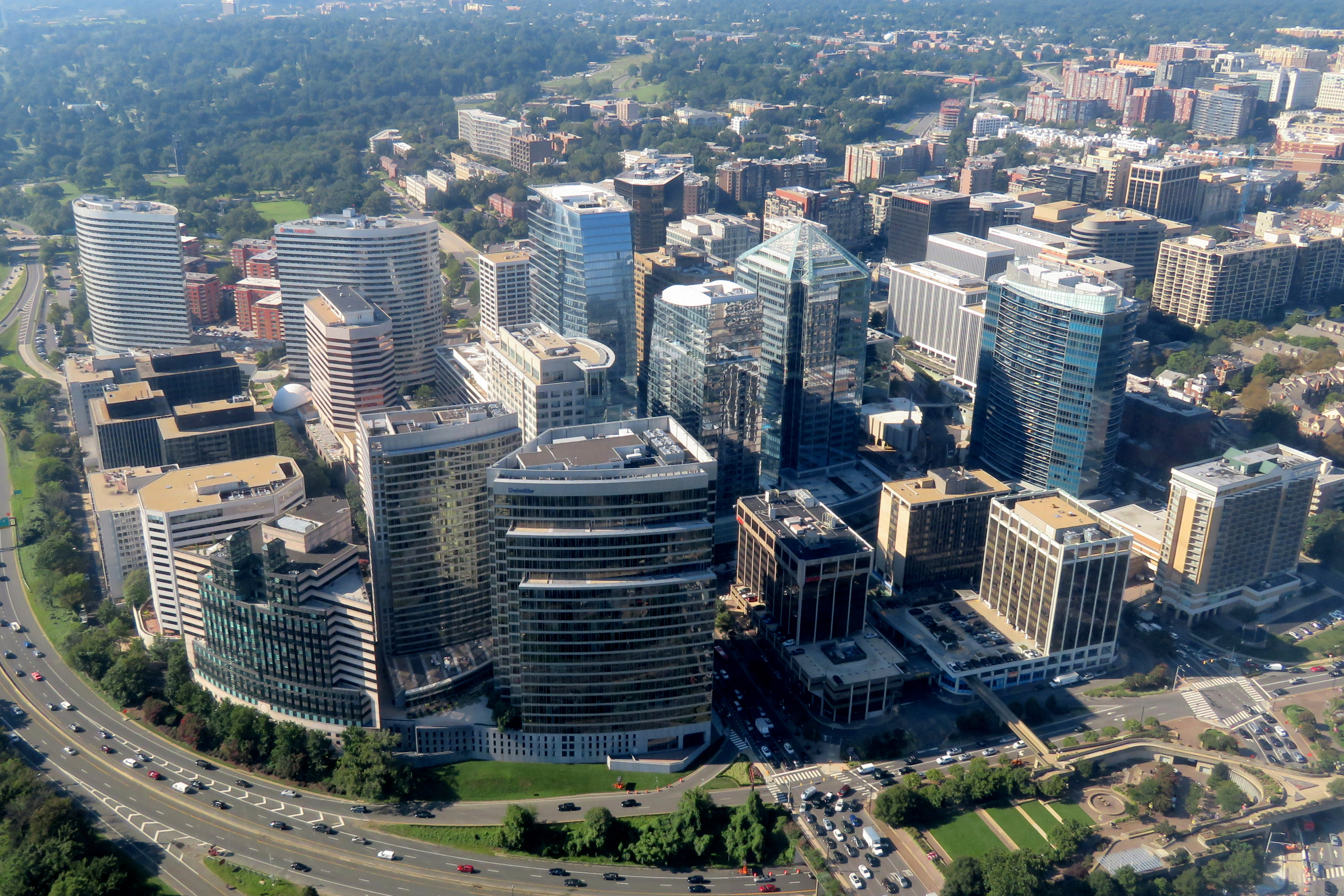
Arlington County in Northern Virginia was once part of Washington, D.C.

Over three million people, 35% of Virginians, live in the 20 jurisdictions collectively defined as Northern Virginia, part of the larger Washington metropolitan area and the Northeast megalopolis. Fairfax County, with more than 1.1 million residents, is Virginia's most populous jurisdiction, and has a major urban business and shopping center in Tysons, Virginia's largest office market. Neighboring Prince William County, with over 450,000 residents, is Virginia's second-most populous county and home to Marine Corps Base Quantico, the FBI Academy, and Manassas National Battlefield Park. Arlington County is the smallest self-governing county in the U.S. by land area, and local politicians have proposed reorganizing it as an independent city due to its high density. Loudoun County is the fastest-growing county in the state. In western Virginia, Roanoke city and Montgomery County, part of the Blacksburg–Christiansburg metropolitan area, both have surpassed a population of 100,000 since 2018.

On the western edge of the Tidewater region is Virginia's capital, Richmond, which has a population of around 230,000 in its city proper and over 1.3 million in its metropolitan area. On the eastern edge is the Hampton Roads metropolitan area, where over 1.7 million reside across six counties and nine cities, including the Commonwealth's three most populous independent cities: Virginia Beach, Chesapeake, and Norfolk. Neighboring Suffolk, which includes a portion of the Great Dismal Swamp, is the largest city by area at 429.1 square miles (1,111 km^{2}). One reason for the concentration of independent cities in the Tidewater region is that several rural counties there re-incorporated as cities or consolidated with existing cities to try to hold on to their new suburban neighborhoods that started booming in the 1950s, since cities like Norfolk and Portsmouth were able to annex land from adjoining counties until a moratorium in 1987. Others, like Poquoson, became cities to try to preserve racial segregation during the desegregation era of the 1970s.

Largest Metropolitan and Micropolitan Statistical Areas in Virginia U.S. Census Bureau MSA Population Estimates 2023
Rank	Name	Pop.	Rank	Name	Pop.
1	Northern Virginia	3,154,735	11	Danville	101,408
2	Hampton Roads	1,727,503	12	Bristol	92,290
3	Richmond	1,349,732	13	Martinsville	63,465
4	Roanoke	314,314	14	Tazewell	39,120
5	Lynchburg	264,590	15	Lake of the Woods	38,574
6	Charlottesville	225,127
7	Blacksburg–Christiansburg	181,428
8	Harrisonburg	137,650
9	Staunton–Waynesboro	127,344
10	Winchester	123,611

== Demographics ==
Historical population
Census	Pop.	Note	%±
1790	691,737		—
1800	807,557		16.7%
1810	877,683		8.7%
1820	938,261		6.9%
1830	1,044,054		11.3%
1840	1,025,227		−1.8%
1850	1,119,348		9.2%
1860	1,219,630		9.0%
1870	1,225,163		0.5%
1880	1,512,565		23.5%
1890	1,655,980		9.5%
1900	1,854,184		12.0%
1910	2,061,612		11.2%
1920	2,309,187		12.0%
1930	2,421,851		4.9%
1940	2,677,773		10.6%
1950	3,318,680		23.9%
1960	3,966,949		19.5%
1970	4,648,494		17.2%
1980	5,346,818		15.0%
1990	6,187,358		15.7%
2000	7,078,515		14.4%
2010	8,001,024		13.0%
2020	8,631,393		7.9%
2025 (est.)	8,880,107		2.9%
1790–2020, 2025

The 2020 census found the state resident population was 8,631,393, a 7.9% increase since the 2010 census. Another 23,149 Virginians live overseas, giving the state a total population of 8,654,542. Virginia has the fourth-largest overseas population of U.S. states due to its federal employees and military personnel. The fertility rate in Virginia as of 2020 was 55.8 per 1,000 females between the ages of 15 and 44, and the median age as of 2021 was the same as the national average of 38.8 years old. The geographic center of population is located in Caroline County, as of 2020. As of 2020, Virginia Beach was most representative of the state's income, race, and level of educational attainment.

Though still growing naturally as births outnumber deaths, Virginia has had a negative net migration rate since 2013, with 8,995 more people leaving the state than moving to it in 2021. This is largely credited to high home prices in Northern Virginia, which are driving residents there to relocate south; Raleigh is their top destination. Aside from Virginia, the top birth state for Virginians is New York, with the Northeast accounting for the largest number of domestic migrants into the state by region. About 12 percent of residents were born outside the United States as of 2020. El Salvador is the most common foreign country of birth, with India, Mexico, South Korea, the Philippines, and Vietnam as other common birthplaces.

=== Race and ethnicity ===
White non-Hispanics, the state's most populous racial group, have declined as a proportion of the population from 76% in 1990 to 58.6% in 2020. Immigrants from Britain and Ireland settled throughout the Commonwealth during the colonial period, when roughly three-fourths of immigrants came as indentured servants. The Appalachian mountains and Shenandoah Valley have many settlements that were populated by German and Scotch-Irish immigrants in the 18th and 19th centuries, often following the Great Wagon Road. Over ten percent of Virginians have German ancestry as of 2020.

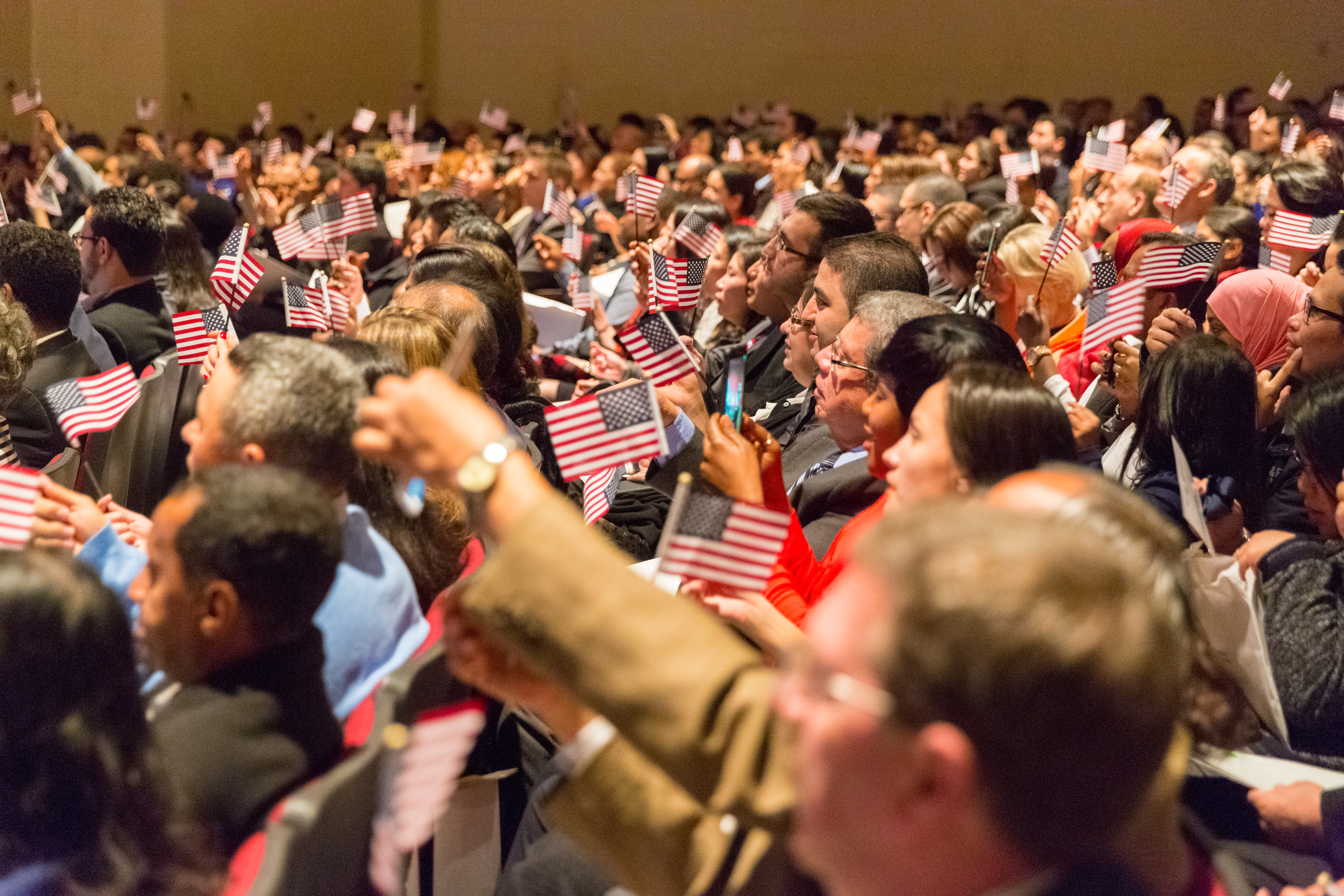
New citizens attend a naturalization ceremony in Northern Virginia, where 25% of residents are foreign-born, almost twice the overall state average.

The largest minority group in Virginia are Blacks and African Americans, about one-fifth of the population. Virginia was a major destination of the Atlantic slave trade. The Igbo ethnic group of what is now southern Nigeria were the largest African group among slaves in Virginia. Blacks in Virginia also have more European ancestry than those in other southern states, and DNA analysis shows many have asymmetrical male and female ancestry from before the Civil War, evidence of European fathers and African or Native American mothers. Though the Black population was reduced by the Great Migration to northern industrial cities in the first half of the 20th century, since 1965 there has been a reverse migration of Blacks returning south. The Commonwealth has the highest number of Black-White interracial marriages in the US, and 8.2 percent of Virginians describe themselves as multiracial.

More recent immigration since the late 20th century has resulted in new communities of Hispanics and Asians. As of 2020, 10.5% of Virginia's total population describe themselves as Hispanic or Latino, and 8.8% as Asian. The state's Hispanic population rose by 92% from 2000 to 2010, with two-thirds of Hispanics in the state living in Northern Virginia. Northern Virginia also has a significant population of Vietnamese Americans, whose major wave of immigration followed the Vietnam War. Korean Americans have migrated there more recently, while about 45,000 Filipino Americans have settled in the Hampton Roads area.

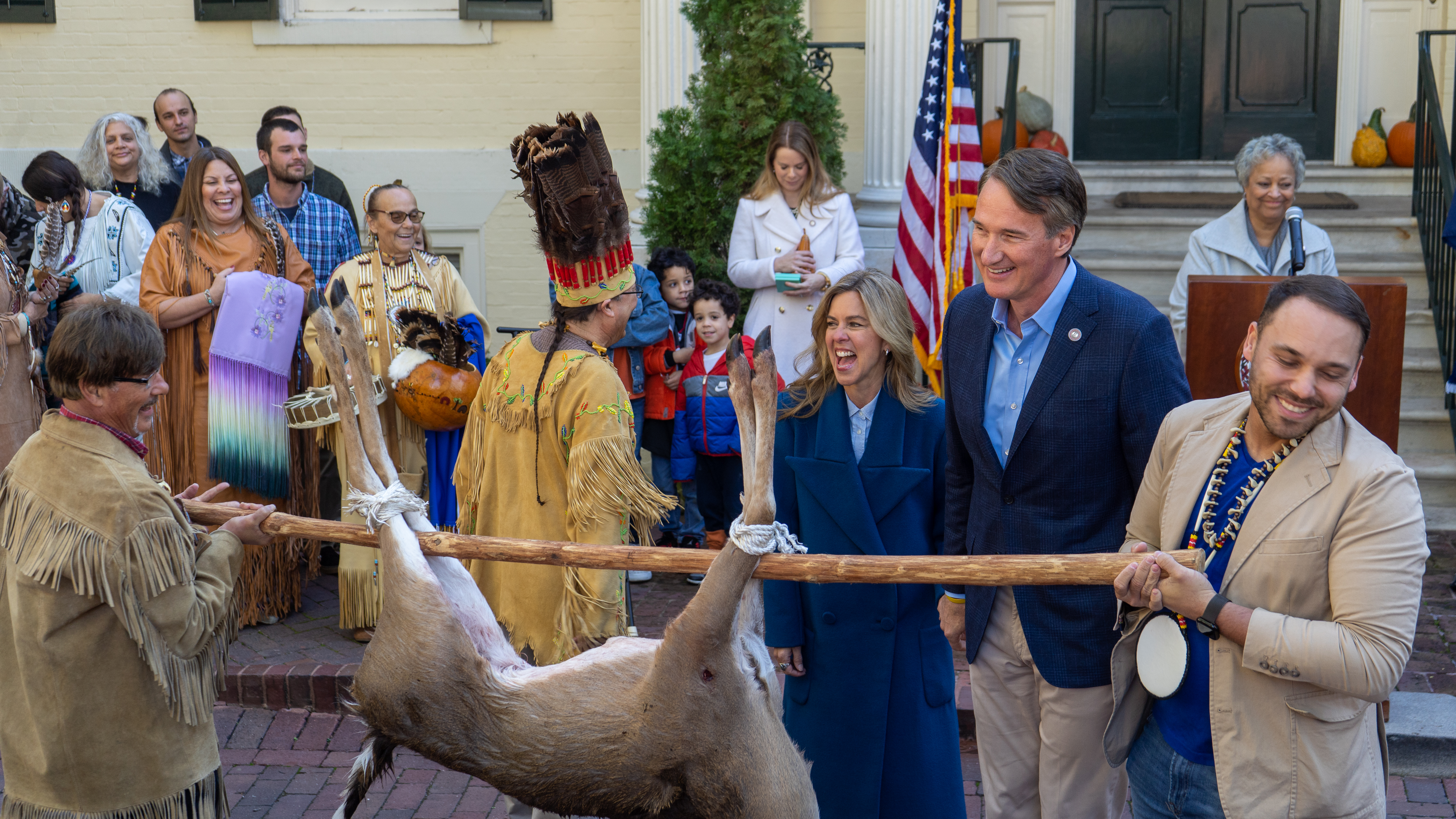
Governor Glenn Youngkin receiving a ceremonial tribute from representatives of the Mattaponi and Pamunkey tribes, a Thanksgiving tradition since 1677

Tribal membership in Virginia is complicated by the legacy of the state's "pencil genocide" of intentionally categorizing Native Americans and Blacks together, and many tribal members do have African or European ancestry, or both. In 2020, the U.S. Census Bureau found that only 0.5% of Virginians were exclusively American Indian or Alaska Native, though 2.1% were in some combination with other ethnicities. The state government has extended recognition to 11 tribes. Seven tribes also have federal recognition. The Pamunkey and Mattaponi have reservations on tributaries of the York River in the Tidewater region.

Largest race by county or city	Race and ethnicity (2020)	Alone	Total
Legend: Non-Hispanic White 30–39% 40–49% 50–59% 60–69% 70–79% 80–89% 90–99% / Black or African American 40–49% 50–59% 60–69% 70–79% / Hispanic or Latino 40–49%	Non-Hispanic White	58.6%	62.8%
Legend: Non-Hispanic White 30–39% 40–49% 50–59% 60–69% 70–79% 80–89% 90–99% / Black or African American 40–49% 50–59% 60–69% 70–79% / Hispanic or Latino 40–49%	Black or African American	18.3%	20.1%
Legend: Non-Hispanic White 30–39% 40–49% 50–59% 60–69% 70–79% 80–89% 90–99% / Black or African American 40–49% 50–59% 60–69% 70–79% / Hispanic or Latino 40–49%	Hispanic or Latino (of any race)		10.5%
Legend: Non-Hispanic White 30–39% 40–49% 50–59% 60–69% 70–79% 80–89% 90–99% / Black or African American 40–49% 50–59% 60–69% 70–79% / Hispanic or Latino 40–49%	Asian	7.1%	8.6%
Legend: Non-Hispanic White 30–39% 40–49% 50–59% 60–69% 70–79% 80–89% 90–99% / Black or African American 40–49% 50–59% 60–69% 70–79% / Hispanic or Latino 40–49%	American Indian and Alaska Native	0.2%	1.5%
Legend: Non-Hispanic White 30–39% 40–49% 50–59% 60–69% 70–79% 80–89% 90–99% / Black or African American 40–49% 50–59% 60–69% 70–79% / Hispanic or Latino 40–49%	Other	0.6%	1.5%
Largest ancestry by county or city	Ancestry (2020 est.)	Total
American Community Survey five-year estimate	Irish or Scotch-Irish	10.4%
American Community Survey five-year estimate	German	10.3%
American Community Survey five-year estimate	English	9.8%
American Community Survey five-year estimate	American	9.4%
American Community Survey five-year estimate	Subsaharan African	2.3%

=== Languages ===
A recording of a resident of Tangier Island who was born in the late 1800s, showcasing the island's unique accent

According to U.S. Census data as of 2022 on Virginia residents aged five and older, 83% (6,805,548) speak English at home as a first language. Spanish is the next most commonly spoken language, with 7.5% (611,831) of Virginia households, though age is a factor; 8.7% (120,560) of Virginians under age 18 speak Spanish. Arabic was the third most commonly spoken language with around 0.8% of residents, followed by Chinese languages and Vietnamese each with over 0.7%, and then Korean and Tagalog, just under 0.7% and 0.6% respectively.

English was passed as the Commonwealth's official language by statutes in 1981 and again in 1996, though the status is not mandated by the constitution. While a more homogenized American English is found in urban areas, and the use of Southern accents in general has been on the decline in speakers born since the 1960s, various accents are still present. The Piedmont region is known for its non-rhotic dialect's strong influence on Southern American English, and a BBC America study in 2014 ranked it as one of the most identifiable accents in American English. The Tidewater accent evolved from the language that upper-class English typically spoke in the early Colonial period, while the Appalachian accent has much more influence from the English spoken by Scottish and Irish immigrants from that time. Appalachian stereotypes have, however, led to some from the region code-switching to a less distinct English accent. The English spoken on Tangier Island in the Chesapeake Bay, preserved by the island's isolation, contains many phrases and euphemisms not found anywhere else and retains elements of Early Modern English.

=== Religion ===
Religious tradition (2025)
1. Unaffiliated/Don't Know: 28%
2. Protestantism: 43%
3. Catholicism: 18%
4. Judaism: 3%
5. Jehovah's Witnesses: 2%
6. Hinduism: 2%
7. Islam: 1%
8. Mormonism: 1%
9. Unitarian Universalism: 1%
10. Other Non-Christian: 1%

Virginia enshrined religious freedom in a 1786 statute. Though the state is historically part of America's Bible Belt, the 2025 Public Religion Research Institute (PRRI) survey estimated that 49% of Virginians either seldom or never attend religious services and that the percent of Virginians unaffiliated with any particular religious body had increased from 21% in 2013 to 27% in 2025. The 2020 U.S. Religion Census conducted by the Association of Religion Data Archives (ARDA) similarly found that 55% of Virginians attend none of the state's 10,477 congregations. Overall belief in God has also declined in the South region, of which Virginia is a part, from 93% of respondents in Gallup surveys from 2013 to 2017, to 86% in 2022.

Of the 45% of Virginians who were associated with religious bodies in the 2020 ARDA census, Evangelical Protestants made up the largest overall grouping, with 20.3% of the state's population, while 8.1% and 2% were mainline and Black Protestant respectively. Baptists, 84% of which are counted as Evangelical, included 9.4% of Virginians in that census. Their major division is between the Baptist General Association of Virginia, which formed in 1823, and the Southern Baptist Conservatives of Virginia, which split off in 1996. Other Protestant branches with over one percent of Virginians included Pentecostalism (1.8%), Presbyterianism (1.3%), Anglicanism (1.2%), and Adventism (1%). The 2025 PRRI survey estimated that 43% of Virginians were Protestants, mainly split into 15% White Evangelical, 14% White Mainline, and 11% Black Protestant, though these numbers include individuals who report not attending services.

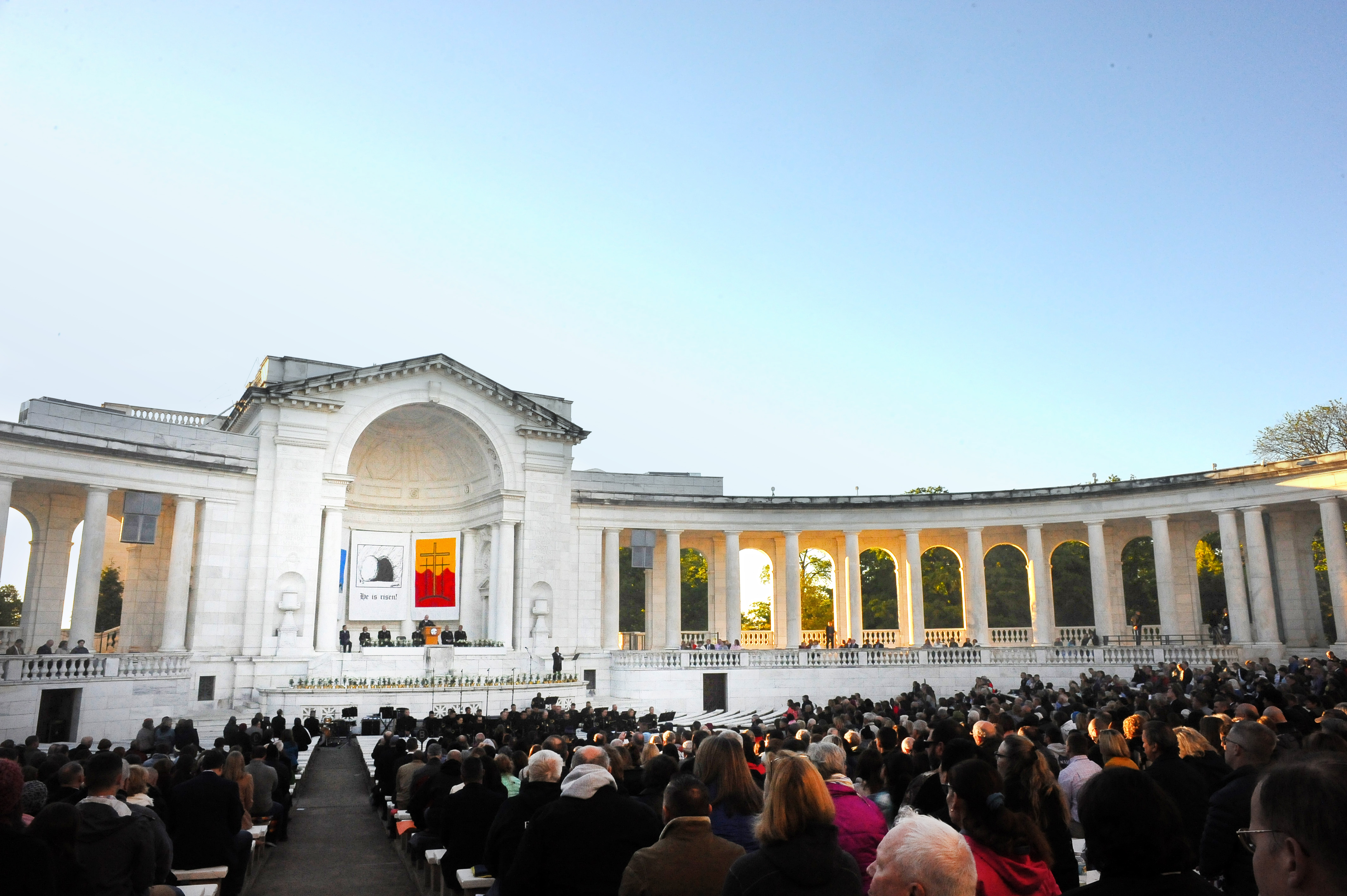
Since 1927, Arlington National Cemetery in Arlington County has hosted an annual nondenominational sunrise service every Easter.

Catholics accounted for 10.3% in the 2020 ARDA census, and 18% in the 2023 PRRI survey, which divided them into 10% White Catholic, 6% Hispanic Catholic, and 2% other. Catholic churches are organized in either the Diocese of Arlington or Richmond, while Episcopal churches are similarly in their Diocese of Virginia, Southern Virginia, and Southwestern Virginia. Adherents of the Church of Jesus Christ of Latter-day Saints constitute just over one percent of the population, with 212 congregations in Virginia as of 2026. While the state's Jewish population is small, organized Jewish sites date to 1789 with Congregation Beth Ahabah.

Fairfax County is the state's most religiously diverse jurisdiction. Fairfax Station is the site of the Ekoji Buddhist Temple, of the Jōdo Shinshū school, and the Hindu Durga Temple of Virginia. The All Dulles Area Muslim Society, on the county's border in Sterling, considers its 11 branches the country's second-largest Muslim mosque community. McLean Bible Church, with around 16,500 weekly visitors, is among the top 25 largest megachurches in the U.S. and 8.4% of Virginians attend nondenomination Christian churches like it, according to the 2020 ARDA census. Lynchburg and Roanoke ranked in that census as the two metropolitan areas with the highest rates of religious adherence, while the state-college-dominated Blacksburg–Christiansburg and Charlottesville were the lowest. Two major Christian universities, Liberty University and the University of Lynchburg, are based in Lynchburg, while Regent University is in Virginia Beach.

== Economy ==
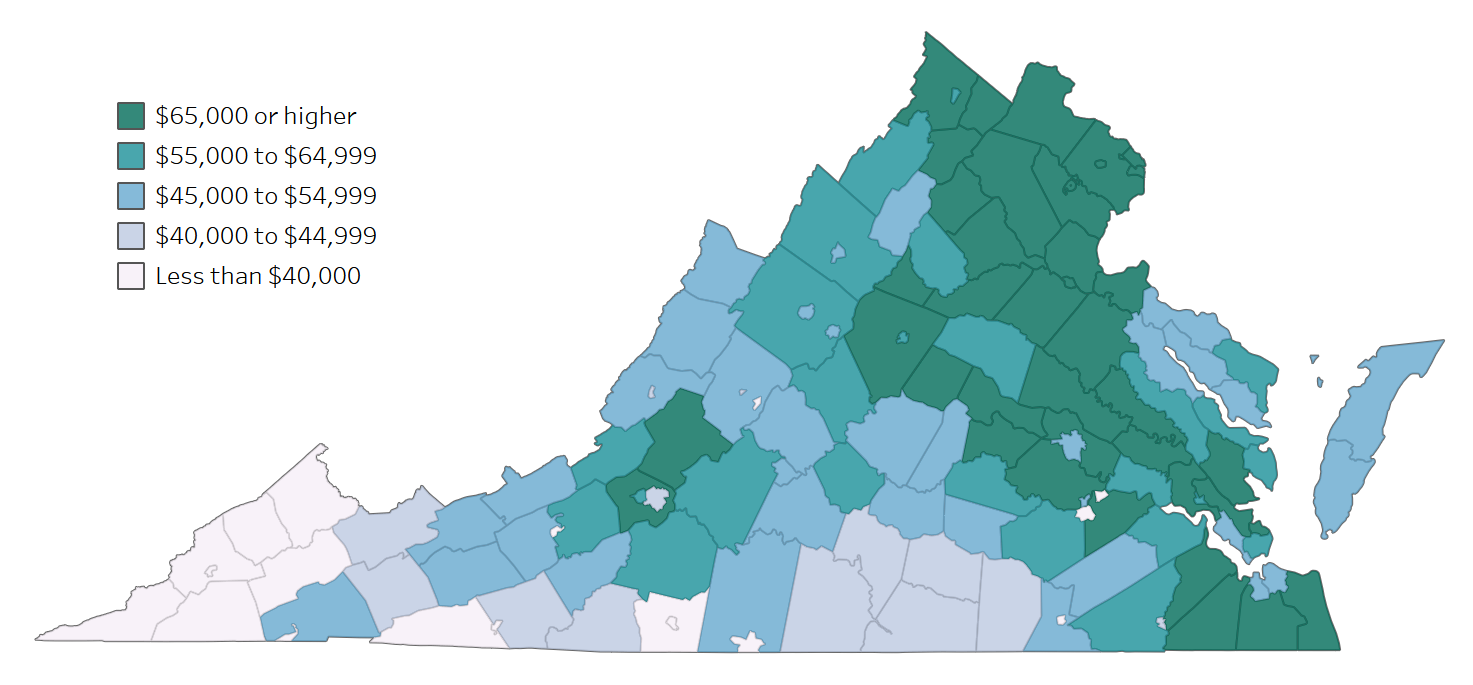
Counties and cities by median household income between 2015 and 2019

Virginia's economy has diverse sources of income, including local and federal government, military, farming and high-tech. In 2025, Virginia's per capita personal income was $80,291 and the state's gross domestic product (GDP) was $798.4 billion. The COVID-19 recession caused jobless claims due to soar over 10% in early April 2020, returning to pre-pandemic levels in 2023. In September 2026, the unemployment rate was 3.6%, which was the 20th-lowest nationwide.

Virginia has a median household income of $89,931, as of 2023, 11th-highest nationwide, and a poverty rate of 10.2%, 10th-lowest nationwide. Montgomery County outside Blacksburg has the highest poverty rate in the state, with 28.5% falling below the U.S. Census poverty thresholds. Loudoun County meanwhile has the highest median household income in the nation, and the wider Northern Virginia region is among the highest-income regions nationwide. As of 2022, 18 of the 100 highest-income counties in the United States, including the two highest, are located in Northern Virginia. Though median home prices in Virginia are generally above the national average, particularly in Northern Virginia, where they were 44.8% higher in May 2024, at $760,000, 69.1% of Virginians own their home as of 2023. The Hampton Roads region has the state's highest per capita number of homeless individuals, with 11 per 10,000, as of 2020. Though the Gini index shows Virginia has less income inequality than the national average, the state's middle class is also smaller than the majority of states.

CNBC ranked Virginia third in their 2026 Top State for Business, with its deductions being mainly a result of cuts to the federal workforce under President Donald Trump and D.O.G.E., while Forbes magazine ranked it as the 16th best to start a business in. In 2025, 99.6% of businesses in Virginia were small businesses and employed 45.9% of the state's workforce. Oxfam America however ranked Virginia in 2025 as only the 23rd-best state to work in, with pluses for worker protections from sexual harassment and pregnancy discrimination, but negatives for laws on organized labor and the low tipped employee minimum wage of $2.13. Virginia has been an employment-at-will state since 1906 and a "right to work" state since 1947, and though state minimum wage increased to $12 in 2023, farm and tipped workers are specifically excluded.

=== Government agencies ===
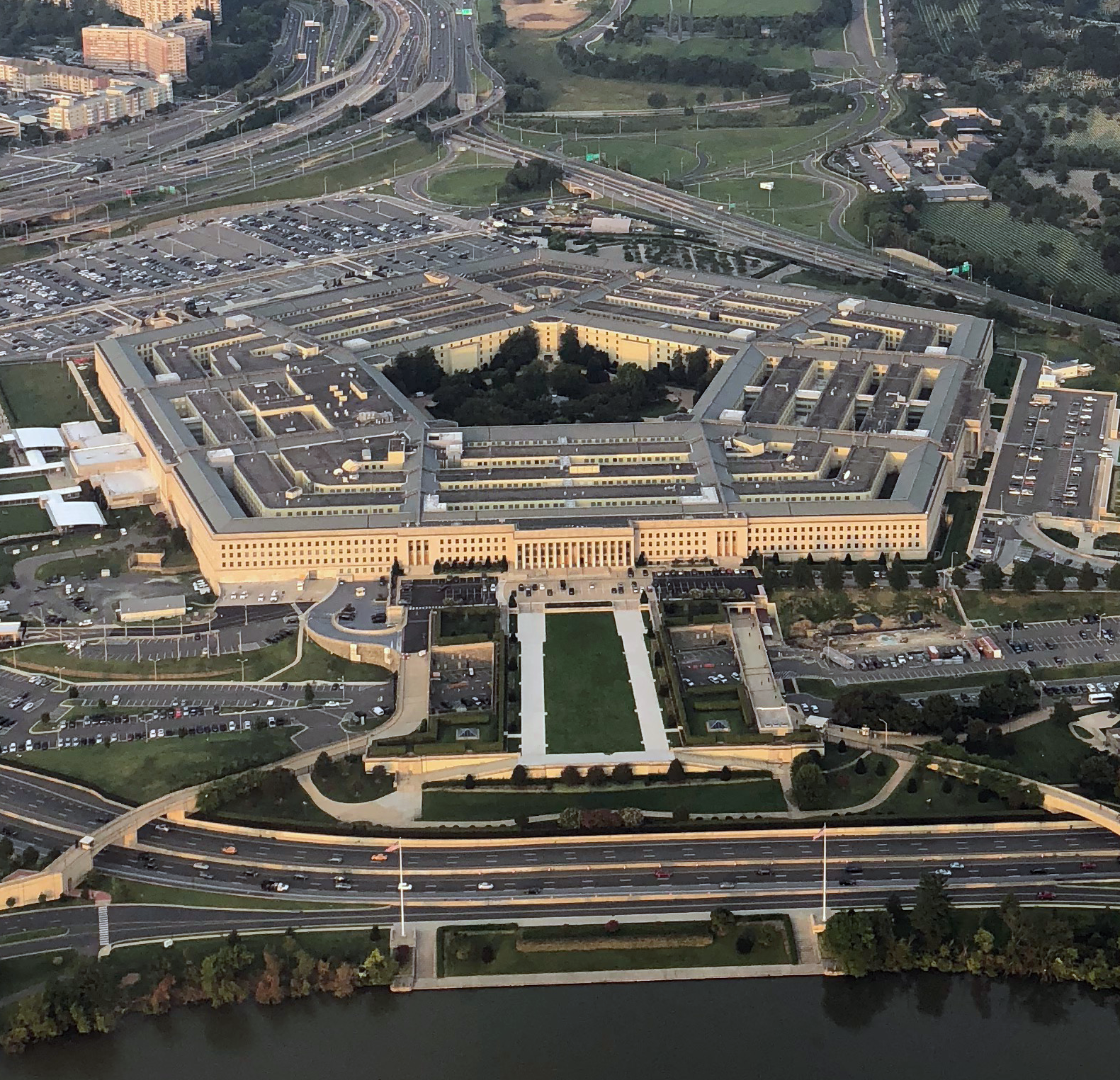
The U.S. Department of Defense is headquartered in Arlington County at the Pentagon.

Government agencies directly employ around 714,100 Virginians as of 2022, almost 17% of all employees in the state. Approximately 12% of all U.S. federal procurement money is spent in Virginia, the second-highest amount after California. As of 2020, 125,648 active-duty personnel, 25,404 reservists, and 99,832 civilians work directly for the U.S. Department of Defense at the Pentagon or one of 27 military bases in the state covering 270,009 acres (1,092.69 km^{2}). Another 139,000 Virginians work for defense contracting firms, which received $44.8 billion worth of contracts in the 2020 fiscal year. Virginia has the second highest concentration of veterans of any state with 9.7% of the population. The Hampton Roads area is home to the world's largest navy base and only NATO station on U.S. soil, Naval Station Norfolk.

Other large federal agencies in Northern Virginia include the Central Intelligence Agency in Langley, the National Science Foundation and U.S. Patent and Trademark Office in Alexandria, the U.S. Geological Survey in Reston, and the U.S. Fish & Wildlife Service in Bailey's Crossroads. Virginia's state government employs over 106,000 public employees, who combined have a median income of $52,401 as of 2018, with the Departments of Transportation and of Education the two largest state departments by expenditure. K–12 teachers in Virginia make an annual average of $59,970, which is 13th-lowest in the U.S. when adjusted for the state's cost of living as of the 2021–22 school year.

=== Business ===
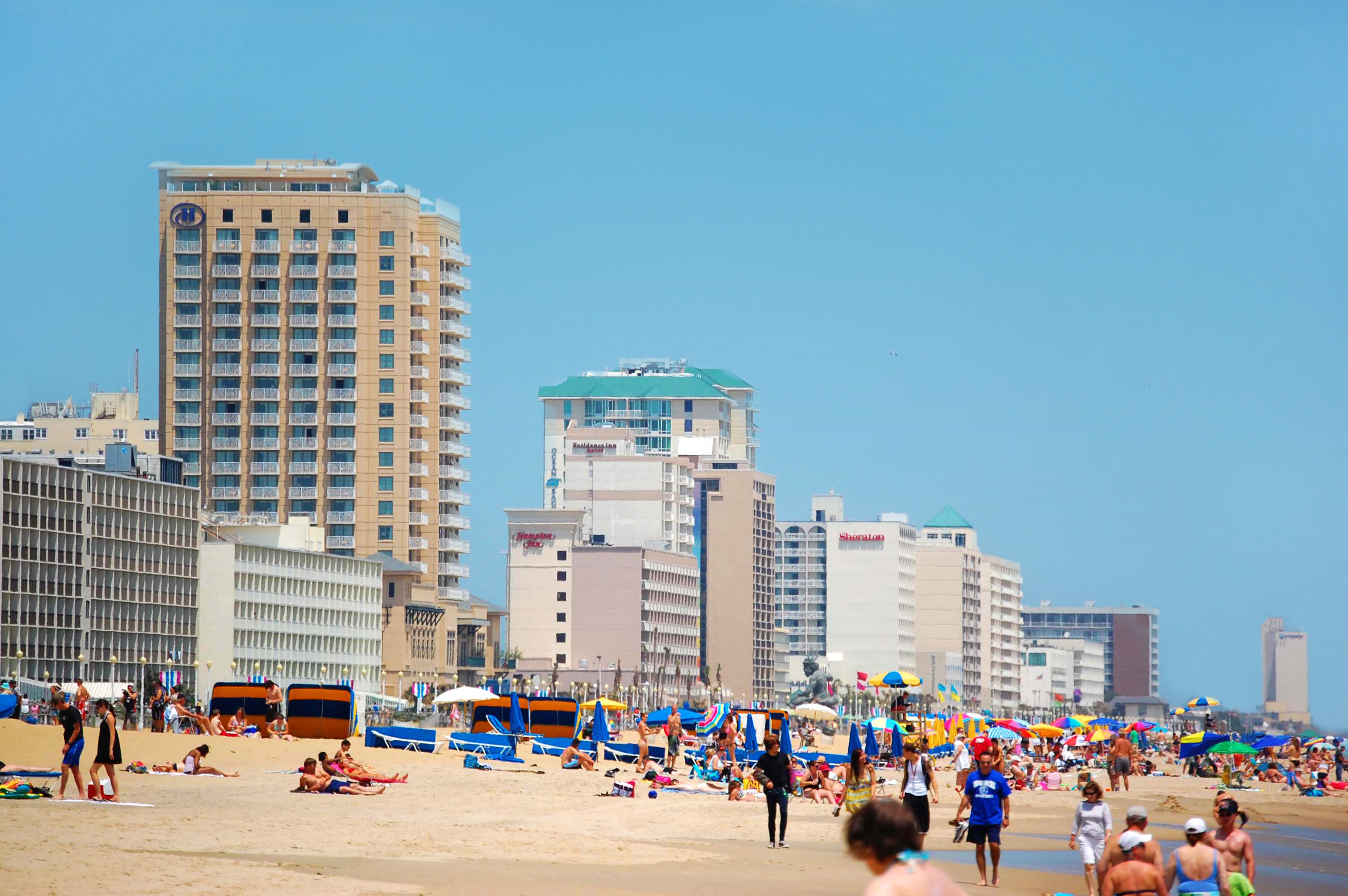
Ocean tourism is an important sector of Virginia Beach's economy.

Based on data as of 2020, Virginia is home to 204,131 separate employers plus 644,341 sole proprietorships. Of the 144,431 registered non-farm businesses in 2017, 59.4% are majority male-owned, 22% are majority female-owned, 19.6% are majority minority-owned, and 8.9% are veteran-owned. Twenty-four Fortune 500 companies are headquartered in Virginia as of 2024, with the largest companies by revenue being Freddie Mac, Boeing, RTX Corporation, Performance Food Group, and Capital One. The two largest by number of employees are Dollar Tree in Chesapeake and Hilton Worldwide Holdings in McLean.

Virginia has the third highest concentration of technology workers and the fifth highest overall number among U.S. states as of 2020, with the 451,268 tech jobs accounting for 11.1% of all jobs in the state and earning a median salary of $98,292. Many of these jobs are in Northern Virginia, which hosts a large number of software, communications, and cybersecurity companies, particularly in the Dulles Technology Corridor and Tysons areas. Amazon additionally selected Crystal City for its HQ2 in 2018, while Google expanded their Reston offices in 2019.

Northern Virginia became the world's largest data center market in 2016, with over 47.7 million square feet (4.43 km^{2}) as of 2023, much of it in Loudoun County, which has branded itself "Data Center Alley". Data centers in Virginia handled around one-third of all internet traffic and directly employed 13,500 Virginians in 2023 and supported 45,000 total jobs. Virginia had the second fastest average internet speed among U.S. states that year and ninth highest percent of households with broadband access, at 93.6%. Computer chips became the state's highest-grossing export in 2006, and had an estimated export value of $740 million in 2022. Though in the top quartile for diversity based on the Simpson index, only 26% of tech employees in Virginia are women, and only 13% are Black or African American.

Tourists spent a record $33.3 billion in Virginia in 2023, an increase of 10% from the previous year, supporting an estimated 224,000 jobs, an increase of 13,000. The state ranked as the eighth most visited based on data from 2022. That year saw 745,000 international visitors, with 41% coming from Canada.

=== Agriculture ===
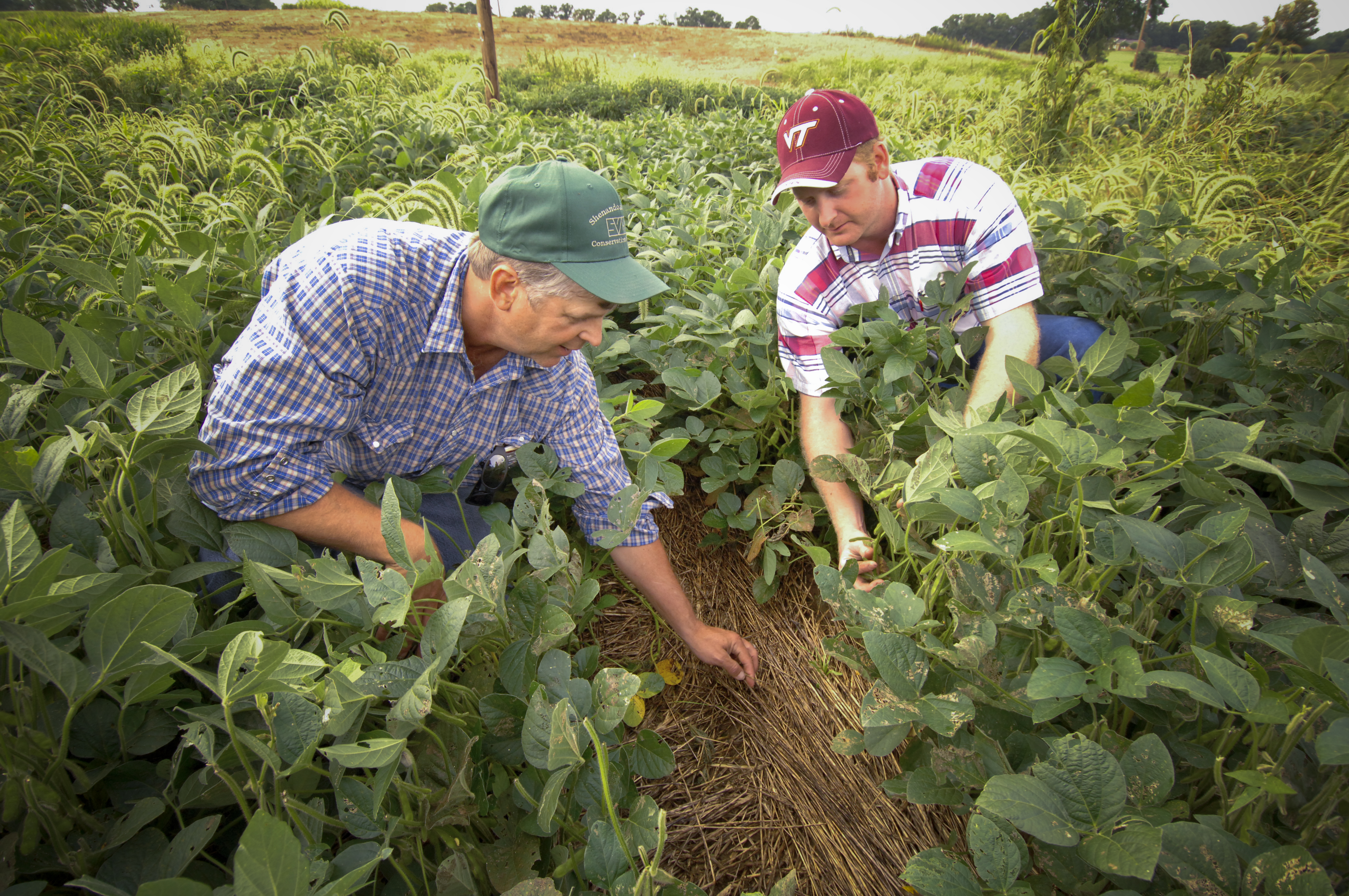
Rockingham County in the Shenandoah Valley accounts for 20 percent of Virginia's agricultural sales as of 2017, with the valley as a whole being the state's most productive region.

As of 2021, agriculture occupies 30% of the land in Virginia with 7.7 million acres (12,031 sq mi; 31,161 km^{2}) of farmland. Nearly 54,000 Virginians work on the state's 41,500 farms, which average 186 acres (0.29 sq mi; 0.75 km^{2}). Though agriculture has declined significantly since 1960, when there were twice as many farms, it remains the largest industry in Virginia, providing for over 490,000 jobs. Soybeans were the most profitable single crop in Virginia in 2022, although the ongoing trade war with China has led many Virginia farmers to plant cotton instead. Other leading agricultural products include corn, cut flowers, and tobacco, where the state ranks third nationally in production.

Virginia is the country's third-largest producer of seafood as of 2021, with sea scallops, oysters, Chesapeake blue crabs, menhaden, and hardshell clams as the largest seafood harvests by value, and France, Canada, New Zealand, and Hong Kong as the top export destinations. Commercial fishing supports 18,220 jobs as of 2020, while recreation fishing supports another 5,893. The population of eastern oysters collapsed in the 1980s due to pollution and overharvesting, but has slowly rebounded, and the 2022–2023 season saw the largest harvest in 35 years with around 700,000 US bushels (25,000 kL). A warm winter and a dry summer made the 2023 wine harvest one of the best for vineyards in the Northern Neck and along the Blue Ridge Mountains, which also attract 2.6 million tourists annually. Virginia has the seventh-highest number of wineries in the nation, with 388 producing 1.1 million cases a year as of 2024. Virginia's 344 craft breweries also produced 342,075 barrels (40,141 kl) of craft beer in 2025, the 18th-most nationally.

=== Taxes ===
Counties and cities by median property tax paid in 2019

State income tax is collected from those with incomes above a filing threshold. There are five income brackets, with rates ranging from 2.0% to 5.75% of taxable income. The state sales and use tax rate is 4.3%, though there is an additional 1% local tax, for a total of a 5.3% combined sales tax on most purchases. Three regions then have a higher sales tax: 6% in Northern Virginia and Hampton Roads, and 7% in the Historic Triangle. Unlike the majority of states, Virginia does have a 1% sales tax on groceries. This was lowered from 2.5% in January 2023, when the items covered by this lower rate were also extended to include essential personal hygiene goods.

Virginia's property tax is set and collected at the local government level and varies throughout the Commonwealth. Real estate is also taxed at the local level. As of 2021, the overall median real estate tax rate per $100 of assessed taxable value was $0.96, though for 72 of the 95 counties this number was under $0.80 per $100. Northern Virginia has the highest property taxes in the state, with Manassas Park paying the highest effective tax rate at $1.31 per $100, while Powhatan and Lunenburg counties were tied for the lowest, at $0.30. Of local government tax revenue, about 61% is generated from real property taxes while 24% is from tangible personal property, sales and use, and business license tax. The remaining 15% come from taxes on hotels, restaurant meals, public service corporation property, and consumer utilities.

== Culture ==
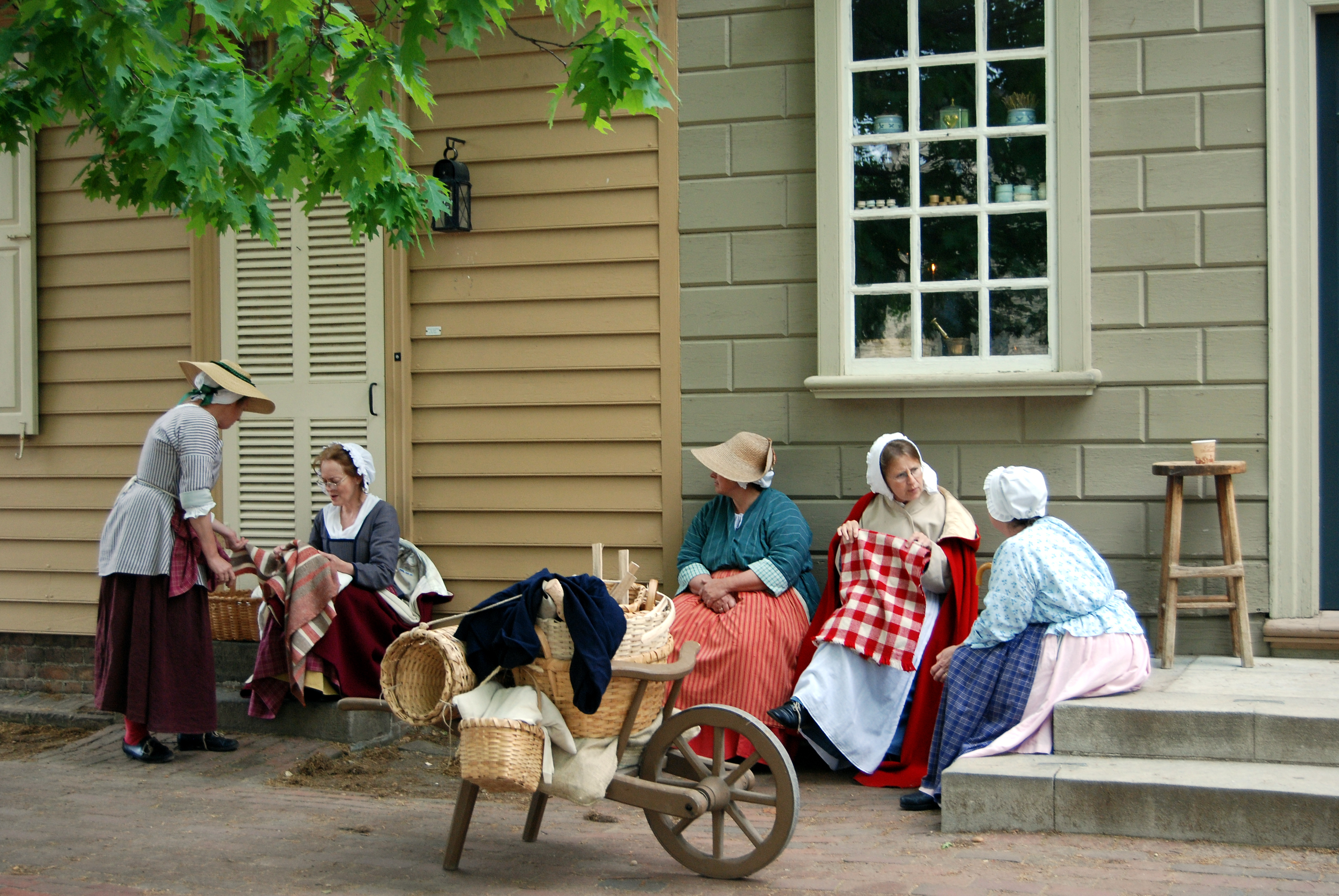
Colonial Virginian culture, language, and style are reenacted in Williamsburg.

Modern Virginian culture has many sources and is part of the culture of the Southern United States. The Smithsonian Institution divides Virginia into nine cultural regions.

Besides the general cuisine of the Southern United States, Virginians maintain their own particular traditions. Virginia wine is made in many parts of the Commonwealth. Smithfield ham, sometimes called "Virginia ham", is a type of country ham which is protected by state law and can be produced only in the town of Smithfield. Virginia furniture and architecture are typical of American colonial architecture. Thomas Jefferson and many of the Commonwealth's early leaders favored the Neoclassical architecture style, leading to its use for important state buildings. The Pennsylvania Dutch and their style can also be found in parts of the Commonwealth.

Literature in Virginia often deals with the Commonwealth's past. The works of Pulitzer Prize winner Ellen Glasgow often dealt with social inequalities and the role of women in her culture. James Branch Cabell wrote extensively about the changing position of gentry in the Reconstruction era, and challenged its moral code with Jurgen, A Comedy of Justice. William Styron approached history in works such as The Confessions of Nat Turner and Sophie's Choice. Tom Wolfe has occasionally dealt with his southern heritage in bestsellers like I Am Charlotte Simmons. Matt Bondurant received critical acclaim for his historic novel The Wettest County in the World about moonshiners in Franklin County during prohibition. Virginia also names a state Poet Laureate.

=== Fine and performing arts ===
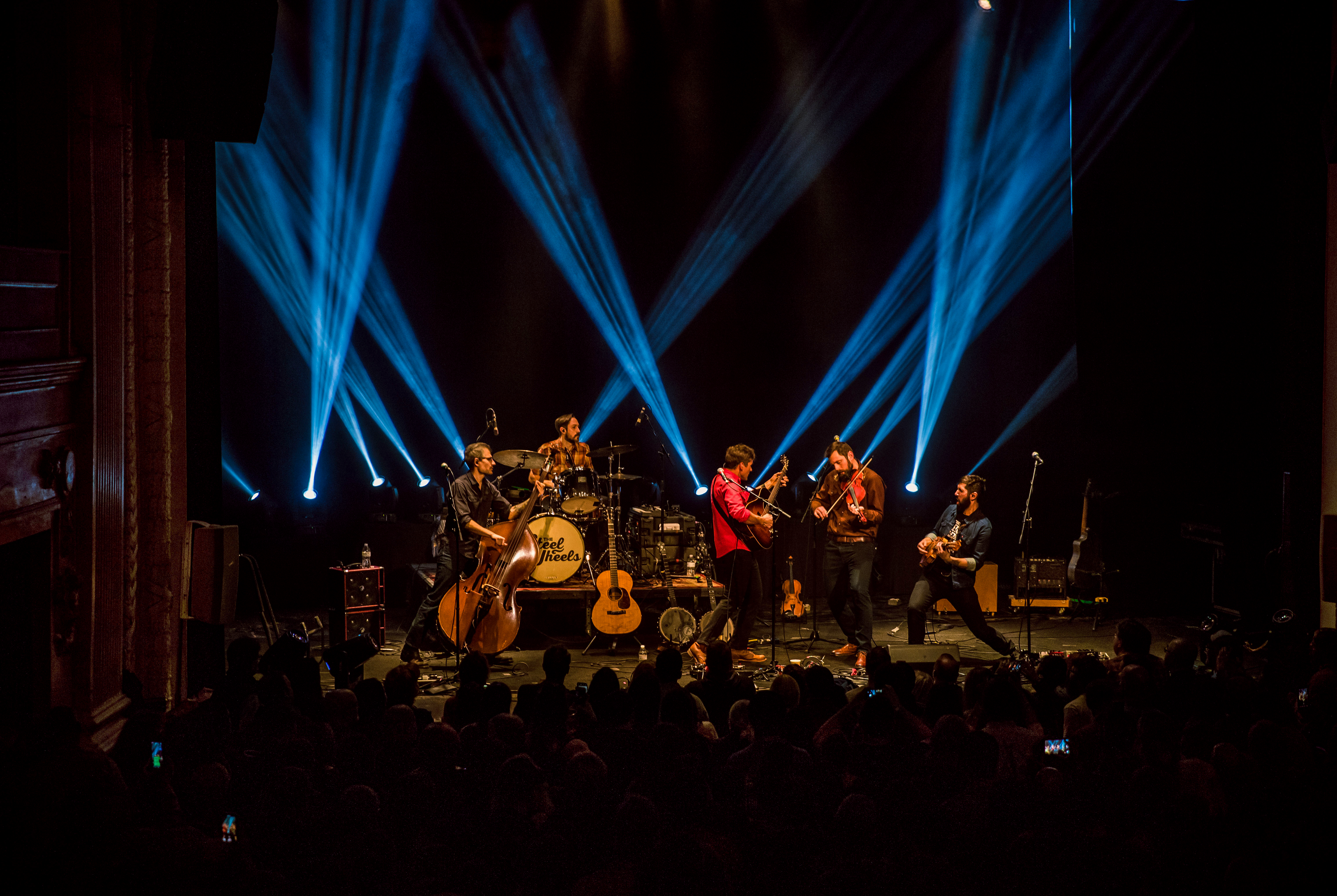
The Steel Wheels, an Americana roots folk rock band, plays at Jefferson Theater in Charlottesville in February 2019.

Virginia ranks near the middle of U.S. states in terms of public spending on the arts as of 2021, at just over half of the national average. The state government does fund some institutions, including the Virginia Museum of Fine Arts and the Science Museum of Virginia. Other museums include the Steven F. Udvar-Hazy Center of the National Air and Space Museum and the Chrysler Museum of Art. Besides these sites, many open-air museums are located in the Commonwealth, such as Colonial Williamsburg, the Frontier Culture Museum, and various historic battlefields. The Virginia Foundation for the Humanities works to improve the Commonwealth's civic, cultural, and intellectual life.

The Harrison Opera House, in Norfolk, is home of the Virginia Opera. The Virginia Symphony Orchestra operates in and around Hampton Roads. Resident and touring theater troupes operate from the American Shakespeare Center in Staunton. The Barter Theatre in Abingdon, designated the State Theatre of Virginia, won the first Regional Theatre Tony Award in 1948, while the Signature Theatre in Arlington won it in 2009. There is also a Children's Theater of Virginia, Theatre IV, which is the second-largest touring troupe in the nation. Notable music performance venues include The Birchmere, the Landmark Theater, and Jiffy Lube Live. Wolf Trap National Park for the Performing Arts is located in Vienna and is the only national park intended for use as a performing arts center.

Virginia is known for its tradition in the music genres of old-time string and bluegrass, with groups such as the Carter Family and Stanley Brothers achieving national prominence during the 1940s. The state's African tradition is found through gospel, blues, and shout bands, with both Ella Fitzgerald and Pearl Bailey coming from Newport News. Contemporary Virginia is also known for folk rock artists like Dave Matthews and Jason Mraz, R&B artists Chris Brown, D'Angelo, and Kali Uchis, hip-hop stars like Pharrell Williams, Timbaland, Missy Elliott and Pusha T, as well as thrash metal groups like Gwar, Lamb of God and metalcore acts like Bad Omens. Several members of country music band Old Dominion grew up in the Roanoke area, and took their band name from Virginia's state nickname.

=== Festivals ===
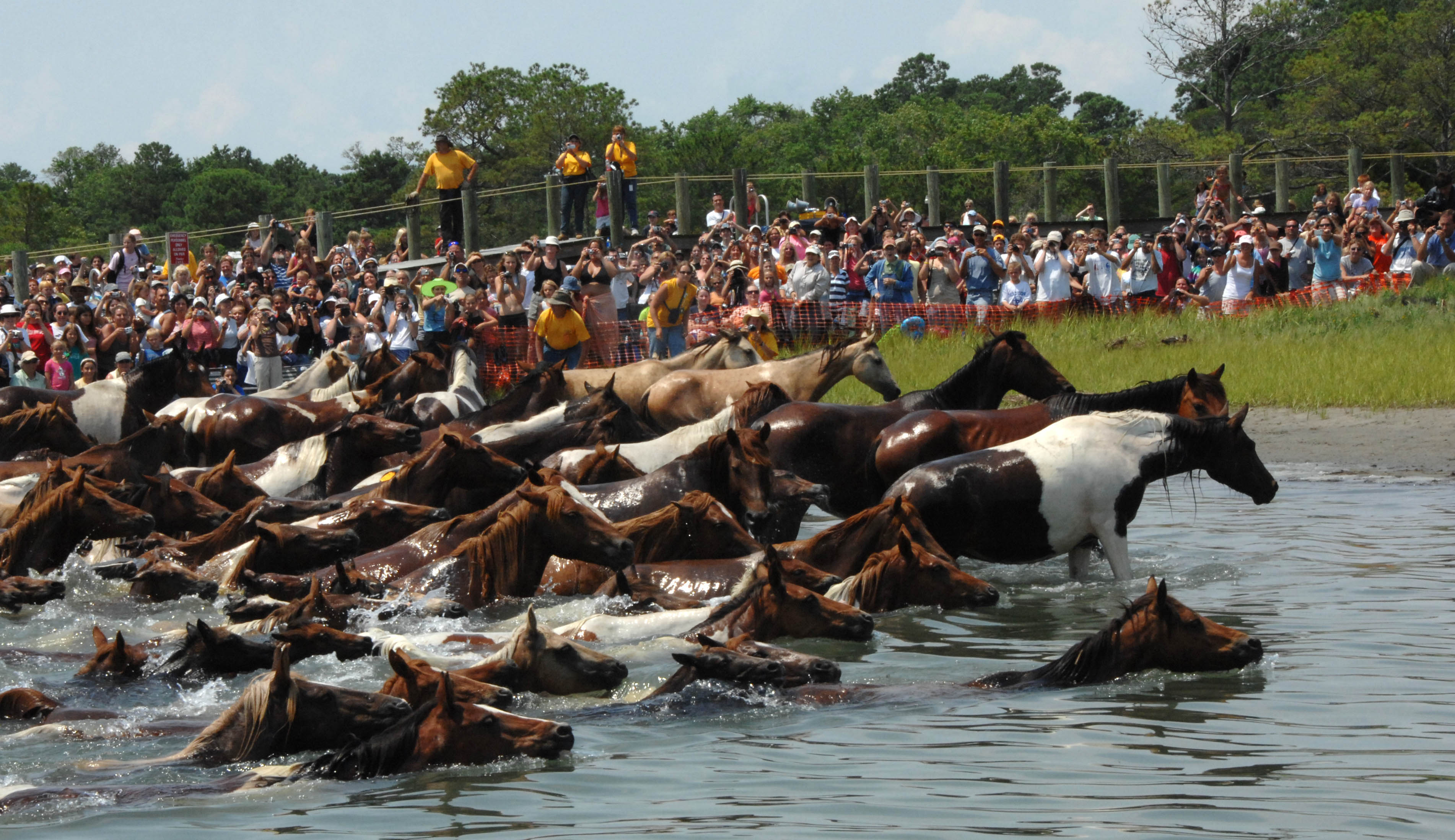
The annual Pony Penning features more than 200 wild ponies swimming across the Assateague Channel into Chincoteague.

Many counties and localities host county fairs and festivals. The Virginia State Fair is held at the Meadow Event Park every September. Also in September is the Neptune Festival in Virginia Beach, which celebrates the city, the waterfront, and regional artists. Norfolk's Harborfest, in June, features boat racing and air shows. Fairfax County also sponsors Celebrate Fairfax! with popular and traditional music performances. The Virginia Lake Festival is held in July in Clarksville. The Eastern Shore island of Chincoteague hosts the annual Pony Penning of feral Chincoteague ponies, expanded into a week-long carnival. Every year on Thanksgiving in Richmond, the Mattaponi and Pamunkey tribes present Virginia's governor with a tribute of deer in a celebration honoring colonial treaties.

The Shenandoah Apple Blossom Festival is a two-week festival held annually in Winchester which includes parades and bluegrass concerts. The Old Time Fiddlers' Convention in Galax, begun in 1935, is one of the oldest and largest such events worldwide. Wolf Trap hosts the Wolf Trap Opera Company, which produces an opera festival every summer. The Blue Ridge Rock Festival has operated since 2017, and has brought as many as 33,000 concert-goers to the Blue Ridge Amphitheater in Pittsylvania County. Two important film festivals, the Virginia Film Festival and the VCU French Film Festival, are held annually in Charlottesville and Richmond, respectively. The Something in the Water has also been a major festival in Virginia Beach, hosted by Pharrell Williams, and has been running since 2019.

== Law and government ==
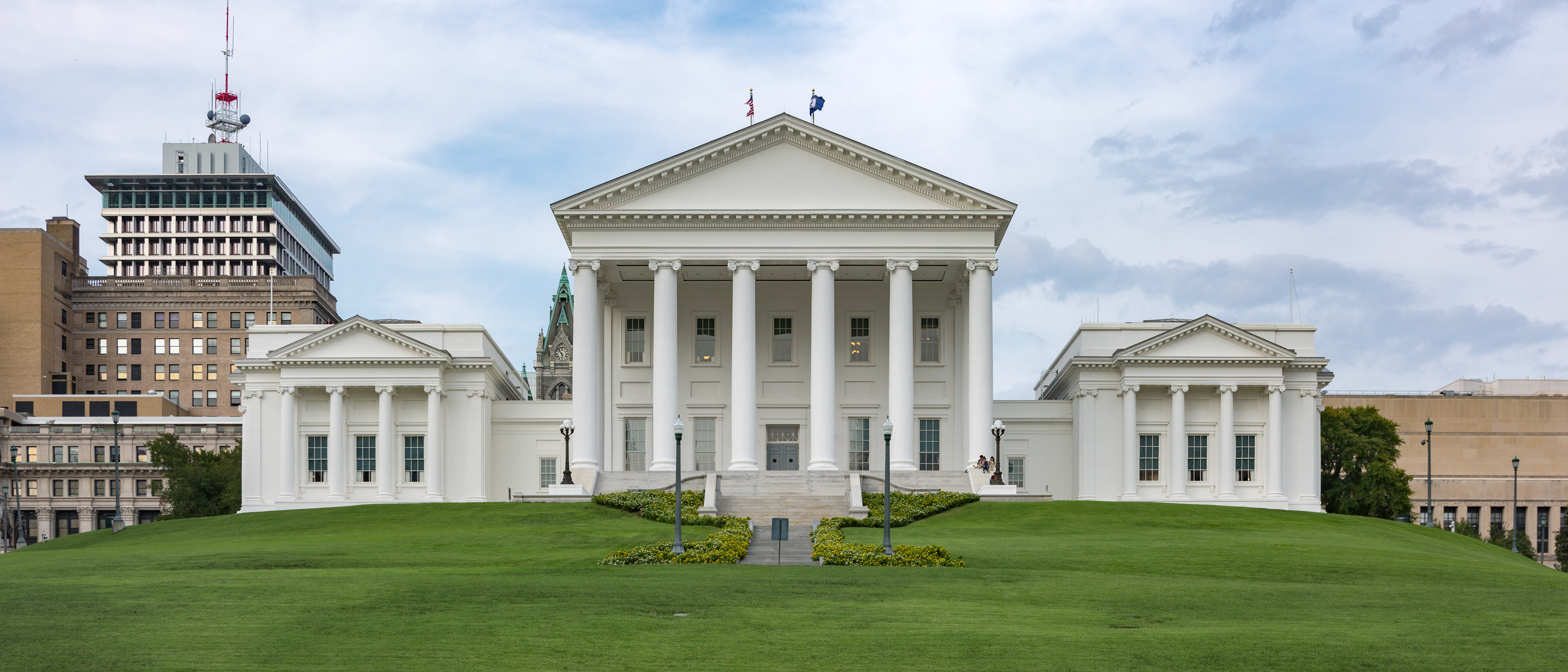
The Virginia State Capitol in Richmond, designed by Thomas Jefferson and Charles-Louis Clérisseau, is home to the Virginia General Assembly.

In 1619, the first Virginia General Assembly met, making Virginia's legislature the oldest of its kind in North America. The government today functions under the seventh Constitution of Virginia, which was approved by voters in 1970 and went into effect in July 1971. It is similar to the federal structure in that it provides for three branches: a strong legislature, an executive, and a unified judicial system.

Virginia's legislature is bicameral, with a 100-member House of Delegates and 40-member Senate, who together write the laws for the Commonwealth. Delegates serve two-year terms, while senators serve four-year terms, with the most recent elections for each taking place in November 2025 and 2023 respectively. The executive department includes the governor, lieutenant governor, and attorney general, who are elected every four years in separate elections, with the most recent taking place in November 2025. Incumbent governors cannot run for re-election; governors can and have served non-consecutive terms. The lieutenant governor is the official head of the Senate and is responsible for breaking ties. The House elects a Speaker of the House and the Senate elects a President pro tempore, who presides when the lieutenant governor is not present, and both houses elect a clerk and majority and minority leaders. The governor also nominates their 16 cabinet members and others who head various state departments.

The legislature starts regular sessions on the second Wednesday of every year. They meet for up to 48 days in odd years, which are election years, or 60 days in even years, to allow more time for biennial state budgets, which governors propose. After regular sessions end, special sessions can be called either by the governor or with agreement of two-thirds of both houses, and 21 special sessions have been called since 2000, typically for legislation on preselected issues. Though not a full-time legislature, the Assembly is classified as a hybrid because special sessions are not limited by the state constitution and often last several months. A one-day "veto session" is also automatically triggered when a governor chooses to veto or return legislation to the Assembly with amendments. Vetoes can then be overturned with approval of two-thirds of both the House and Senate. A bill that passes with two-thirds approval can also become law without action from the governor, and Virginia has no "pocket veto", so bills become law if the governor chooses to neither approve nor veto them.

=== Legal system ===
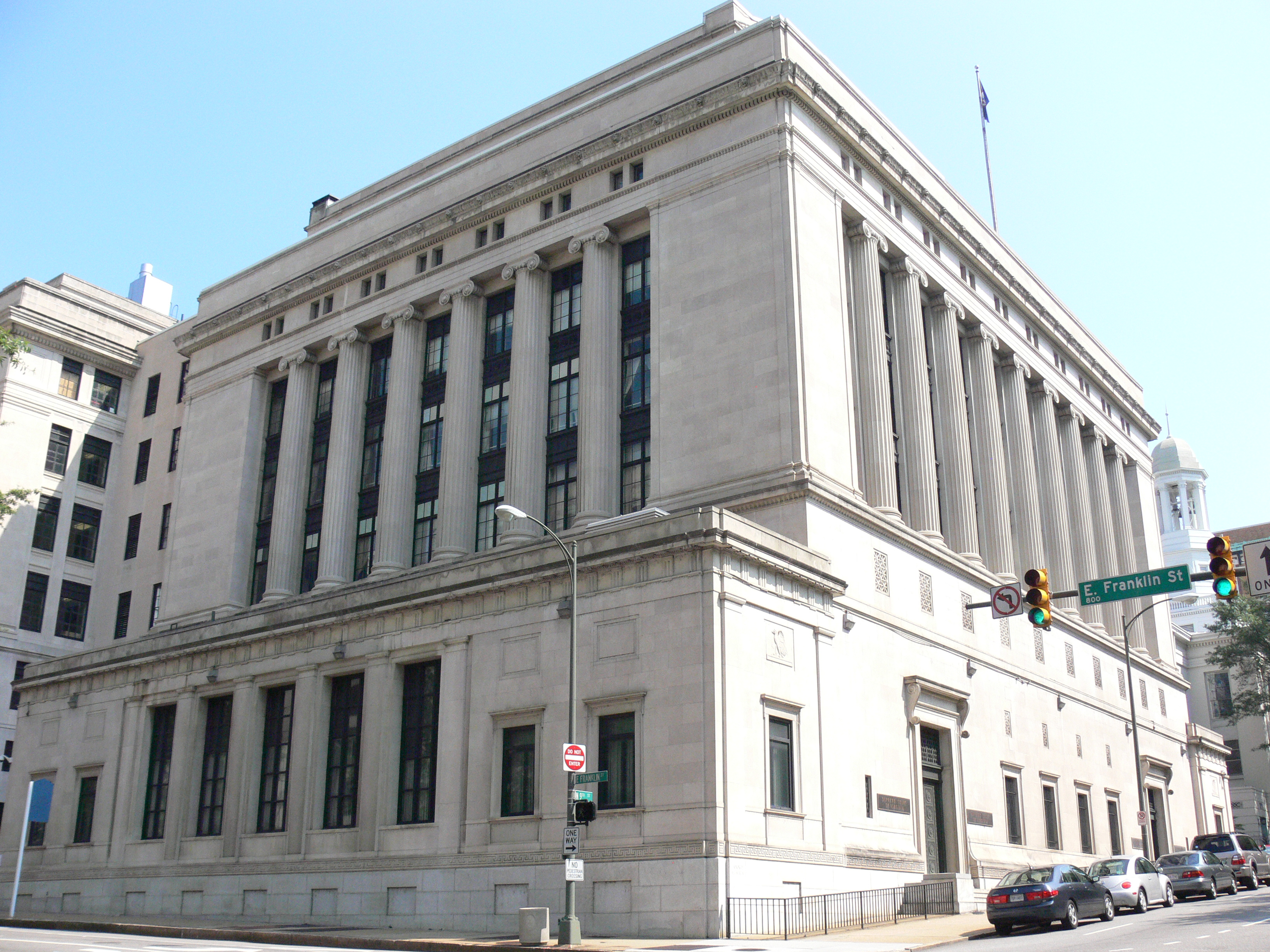
Unlike the federal judiciary system, justices of the Virginia Supreme Court have term limits, a mandatory retirement age, and select their own Chief Justice.

The judges and justices who make up Virginia's judicial system, also the oldest in America, are elected by a majority vote in both the House and Senate without input from the governor, one way Virginia's legislature is stronger than its executive. The governor can make recess appointments, and when both branches are controlled by the same party, the assembly often confirms them. The judicial hierarchy starts with the General District Courts and Juvenile and Domestic Relations District Courts, with the Circuit Courts above them, then the Court of Appeals of Virginia, and the Supreme Court of Virginia on top. The Supreme Court has seven justices who serve 12-year terms, with a mandatory retirement age of 73; they select their own chief justice, who is informally limited to two four-year terms. Virginia was the last state to guarantee an automatic right of appeal for all civil and criminal cases. Its Court of Appeals increased from 11 to 17 judges in 2021.

The Code of Virginia is the statutory law and consists of the codified legislation of the General Assembly. The largest law enforcement agency in Virginia is the Virginia State Police, with 3,035 sworn and civilian members as of 2019. The Virginia Marine Police were founded as the "Oyster Navy" in 1864 in response to oyster bed poaching. The Virginia Capitol Police protect the legislature and executive department, and are the oldest police department in the United States, dating to the guards who protected the colonial leadership. The governor can also call upon the Virginia National Guard, which consists of approximately 7,200 army soldiers, 1,200 airmen, 300 Defense Force members, and 400 civilians.

Between 1608 and 2021, when the death penalty was abolished, the state executed over 1,300 people, including 113 following the resumption of capital punishment in 1982. Virginia's prison system incarcerates 30,936 people as of 2018, 53% of whom are Black, and the state has the 16th-highest rate of incarceration in the country, at 422 per 100,000 residents. Prisoner parole was ended in 1995, and Virginia's rate of recidivism of released felons who are re-convicted within three years and sentenced to a year or more is 23.1%, the lowest in the country as of 2019. Virginia has the fourth lowest violent crime rate and 13th lowest property crime rate as of 2018. Between 2008 and 2017, arrests for drug-related crimes rose 38%, with 71% of those related to marijuana, which Virginia decriminalized in July 2020 and legalized in July 2021.

== Politics ==
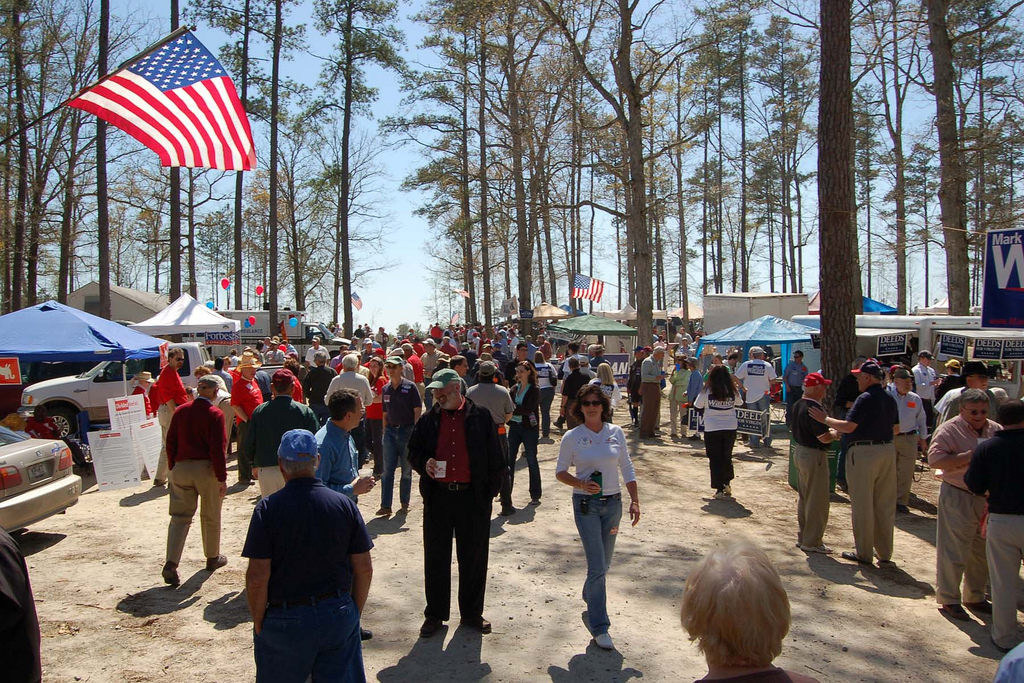
Mirroring Virginia's political transition, the annual Shad Planking event in Wakefield has evolved from a vestige of the Byrd era into a regular stop for many state campaigns.

Over the past century, Virginia has shifted politically from being a largely rural, conservative, Southern bloc member to a state that is more urbanized, pluralistic, and politically moderate, as both greater enfranchisement and demographic shifts have changed the electorate. Up until the 1970s, Virginia was a racially divided one-party state dominated by the Byrd Organization. They sought to stymie the political power of Northern Virginia, perpetuate segregation, and successfully restricted voter registration such that between 1905 and 1948 voter turnout was regularly below ten percent.

Enforcement of federal civil rights legislation passed in the mid-1960s helped overturn the state's Jim Crow laws that effectively disenfranchised African Americans. The Voting Rights Act of 1965 made Virginia one of nine states that were required to receive federal approval for changes to voting laws, until the system for including states was struck down in 2013. The Voting Rights Act of Virginia was passed in 2021, requiring preclearance from the state Attorney General for local election changes that could result in disenfranchisement, including closing or moving polling sites. Though many Jim Crow provisions were removed in Virginia's 1971 constitution, a lifetime ban on voting for felony convictions was unchanged, and by 2016, up to 20 percent of African Americans in Virginia were disenfranchised because of prior felonies. That year, Governor Terry McAuliffe ended the lifetime ban and individually restored voting rights to over 200,000 ex-felons. Virginia moved from being ranked as the second most difficult state to vote in 2016, to the 12th easiest in 2020.

While urban and expanding suburban areas, including much of Northern Virginia, form the modern Democratic Party base, rural southern and western areas moved to support the Republican Party in response to its "southern strategy" starting around 1970. Rural Democratic support has nevertheless persisted in union-influenced Roanoke, college towns such as Charlottesville and Blacksburg, and the southeastern Black Belt Region. African Americans are the most reliable bloc of Democratic voters, but educational attainment and gender have also become strong indicators of political alignment, with the majority of women in Virginia supporting Democratic presidential candidates since 1980. International immigration and domestic migration into Virginia have also increased the proportion of eligible voters born outside the state from 44% in 1980 to 55% in 2019.

=== State elections ===
2025 Virginia House of Delegates election

2023 Virginia Senate election

Republican hold Democratic hold
Republican gain Democratic gain

Because Virginia enacted their post-Civil-War constitution in 1870, state elections in Virginia occur in odd-numbered years, with executive department elections occurring in years following U.S. presidential elections and State Senate elections occurring in the years prior to presidential elections. House of Delegates elections take place concurrent with each of those elections. National politics often play a role in state election outcomes, and Virginians have elected governors of the party opposite the U.S. president in 11 of the last 12 contests, with only Terry McAuliffe beating the trend in 2013.

The 2017 state elections resulted in Democrats holding the three executive offices, as lieutenant governor Ralph Northam won the race for governor. In concurrent House of Delegates elections, Democrats flipped 15 of the Republicans' previous 16-seat majority. Control of the House came down to a tied election in the 94th district, which the Republican won by a drawing of lots, giving the party a slim 51–49 majority in the 2018–19 legislative sessions. Adjusted districts were used in the 2019 elections, when Democrats won full control of the General Assembly, despite a political crisis earlier that year.

In 2021, Glenn Youngkin became the first Republican to win the governor's race since 2009, with his party also winning the races for lieutenant governor and attorney general and gaining seven seats in the House of Delegates. Two years later, new legislative maps drawn by special masters appointed by the state supreme court led to nine retirements in the state senate and to twenty-five House delegates not seeking re-election. In those elections, Democrats claimed a slim majority of one seat in both the Senate and the House. In 2025, Democrat Abigail Spanberger won the 2025 Virginia gubernatorial election, becoming the first female governor of Virginia.

=== Federal elections ===
2024 U.S. presidential election results by county in Virginia Democratic Republican

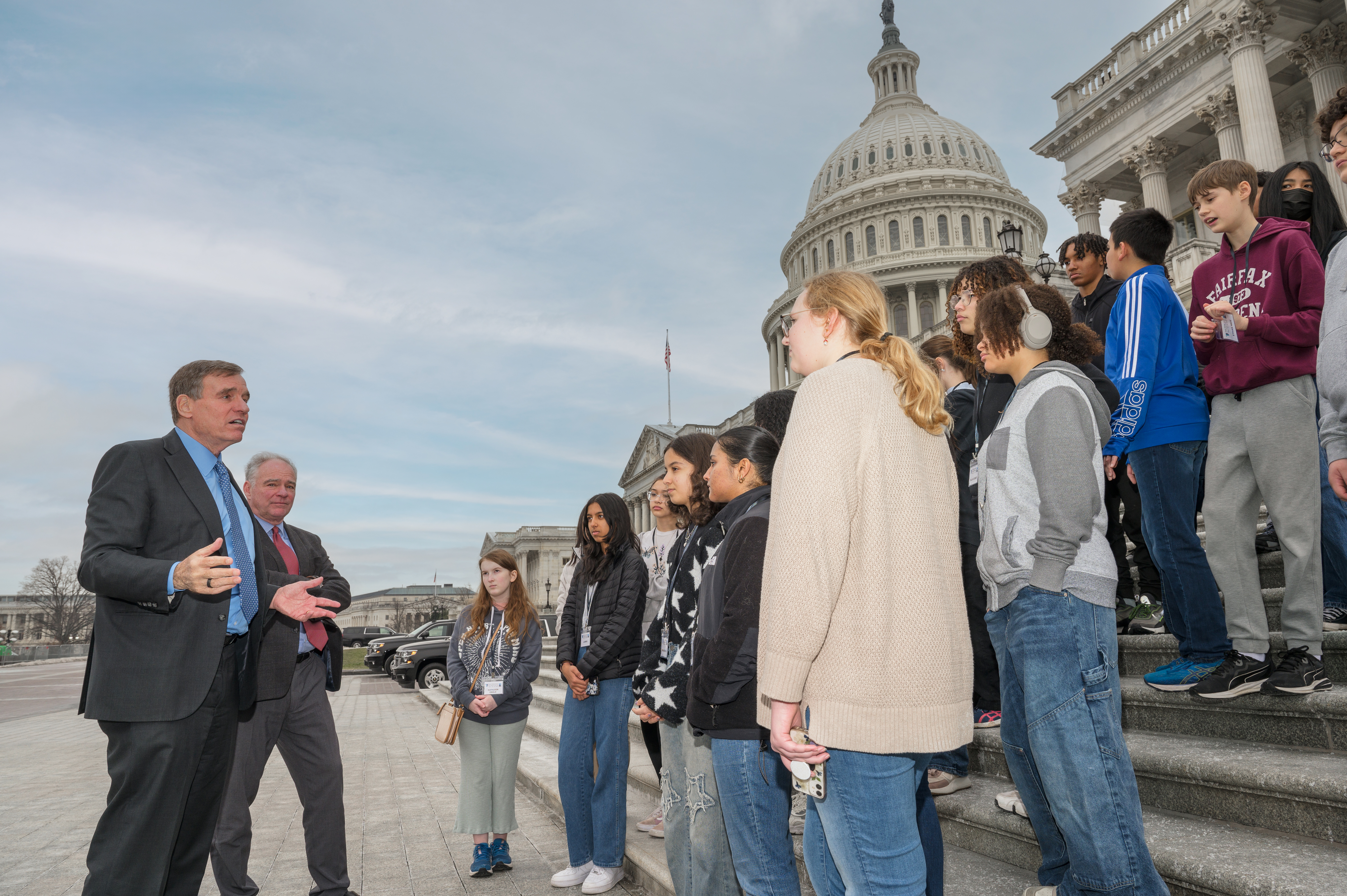
U.S. Senators Mark Warner and Tim Kaine, both former governors, meet with students on the steps of the U.S. Capitol.

Though Virginia was considered a "swing state" in the 2008 presidential election, Virginia's 13 electoral votes were carried in that election and the four since then by Democratic candidates, suggesting the state has shifted to being reliably Democratic in presidential elections. Virginia was the only former Confederate state to vote for the Democrats in the 2016 and 2024 presidential elections. Virginia had previously voted for Republican presidential candidates in 13 out of 14 presidential elections from 1952 to 2004, including ten in a row from 1968 to 2004. Virginia currently holds its presidential open primary election on Super Tuesday, the same day as 14 other states, with the most recent held on March 5, 2024.

Virginia's two U.S. senators are in classes 1 and 2. Virginia has had 11 U.S. House of Representatives seats since 1993, and control of the majority has flipped four times since then, often as part of "wave elections". Currently, six representatives are Democrats and five are Republicans.

=== Gerrymandering ===
Accusations of manipulating legislative districts to improve a party or candidates' chances of winning elections in Virginia go back to the first U.S. Congress election in 1789, when Patrick Henry and his Anti-Federalist allies allegedly drew the boundaries of Virginia's 5th congressional district in an unsuccessful attempt to keep James Madison out of the U.S. House of Representatives. During the Jim Crow era, the Byrd Organization used malapportionment to manipulate what areas were over-represented in the General Assembly and the U.S. Congress until ordered to end the practice by the 1964 U.S. Supreme Court decision in Davis v. Mann and the 1965 Virginia Supreme Court decision in Wilkins v. Davis respectively.

After the 2010 U.S. census, under Governor Bob McDonnell and a Republican controlled General Assembly, Virginia enacted congressional and legislative maps favorable to that party. This led to Virginia being ranked in 2018 as having the most gerrymandered U.S. state legislature, as Republicans controlled the House with only 44.5% of the total vote. The maps were, however, challenged in court, and in 2014, Federal judges ruled Virginia's U.S. House map to be unconstitutionally drawn to discriminate against African Americans. Then in 2019, 11 state house district lines were ordered to be redrawn for the same reason.

Voters in 2020 then passed a referendum to give control of drawing both state and congressional districts to a commission of eight citizens and four legislators from each of the two major parties, rather than the legislature. This commission, however, failed to come to a compromise, requiring the Supreme Court of Virginia to appoint special masters to design maps. As part of a larger mid-cycle redistricting effort across the country, voters approved another referendum in 2026 to allow the Democratic Party majority in the General Assembly to redraw U.S. House districts in way that could favor their party during the 2026 and two subsequent congressional election cycles, but this referendum was subsequently declared null and void by the Virginia Supreme Court.

== Education ==
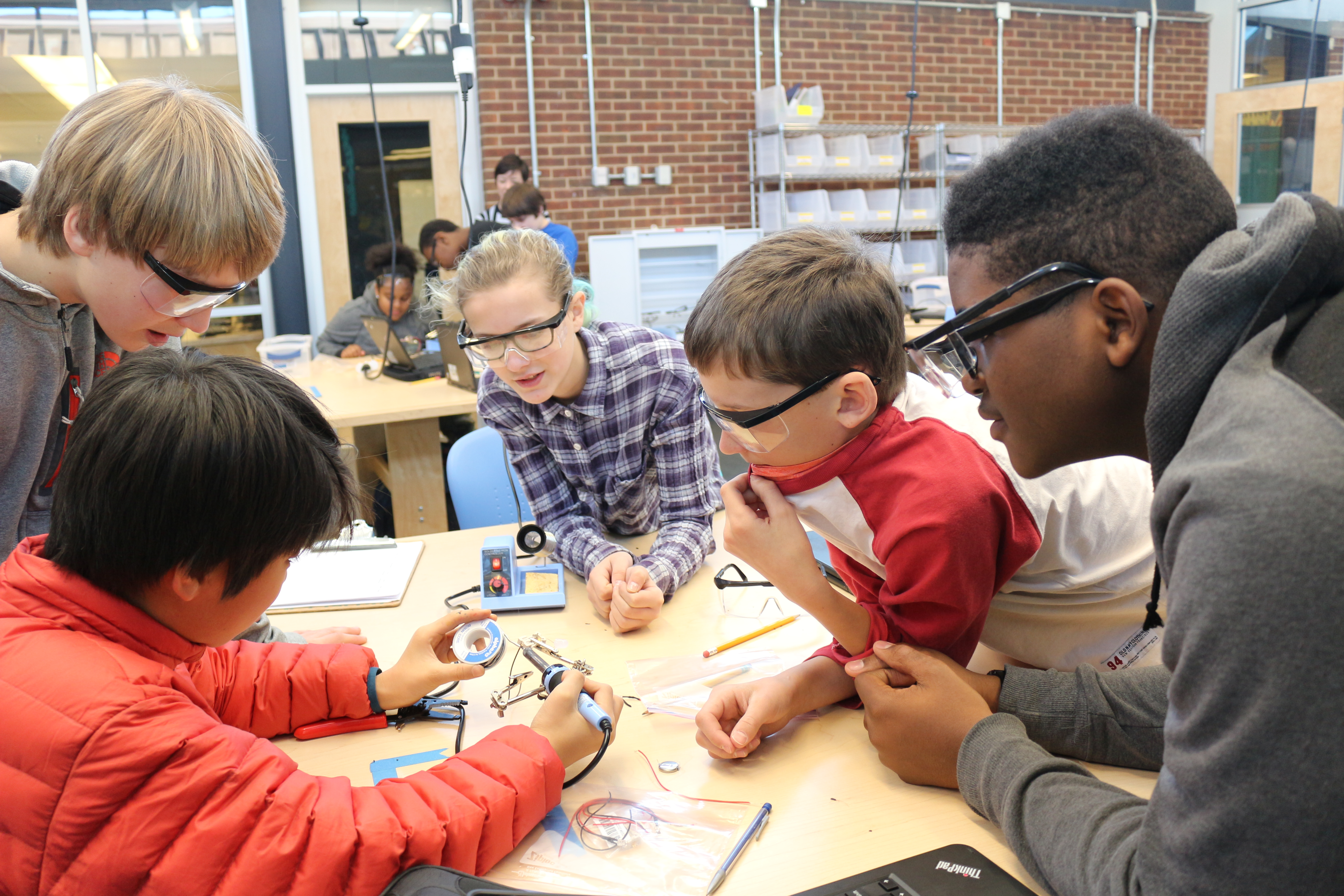
Middle school students in Albemarle County participate in an engineering program in partnership with the Smithsonian Institution.

Virginia's educational system consistently ranks in the top five states on the U.S. Department of Education's National Assessment of Educational Progress, with Virginia students outperforming the average in all subject areas and grade levels tested. Virginia's K–7 schools had a student–teacher ratio of 12.41:1 as of the 2022–23 school year, and 12.52:1 for grades 8–12. All school divisions must adhere to educational standards set forth by the Virginia Department of Education, which maintains an assessment and accreditation regime known as the Standards of Learning.

Public K–12 schools in Virginia are generally operated by the counties and cities, and not by the state. As of the 2023–24 academic year, 1,261,962 students were enrolled in 2,254 local and regional schools in the Commonwealth, including 56 career and technical schools and 290 alternative and special education centers across 126 school divisions. Besides the general public schools in Virginia, there are Governor's Schools and selective magnet schools. The Governor's Schools are a collection of 52 regional high schools and summer programs intended for gifted students, and include the Thomas Jefferson High School for Science and Technology, the top-rated high school in the country in 2022. The Virginia Council for Private Education oversees the regulation of 483 state accredited private schools. An additional 53,680 students receive homeschooling.

In 2022, 92.1% of high school students graduated on-time after four years, and 91.3% of adults over the age 25 had their high school diploma. Virginia has one of the smaller racial gaps in graduation rates among U.S. states, with 91.7% of Black students graduating on time. White non-Hispanic students, by comparison, had a graduation rate of 95.6%, while Asian students saw the highest numbers, with 97.8%. Hispanic students had the highest dropout rate, at 12.5% as of 2025, with high rates being correlated with students listed as English learners. Despite ending school segregation in the 1960s, seven percent of Virginia's public schools were rated as "intensely segregated" by The Civil Rights Project at UCLA in 2019, and the number has risen since 1989, when only three percent were. Virginia has comparatively large public school districts, typically comprising entire counties or cities, and while this helps mitigate funding gaps seen in other states, districts that serve the most students of color received $722 less per student than those severing the fewest, as of 2022. Elementary schools, with Virginia's smallest districts, were found to be more segregated than state middle or high schools by a 2019 VCU study.

=== Colleges and universities ===
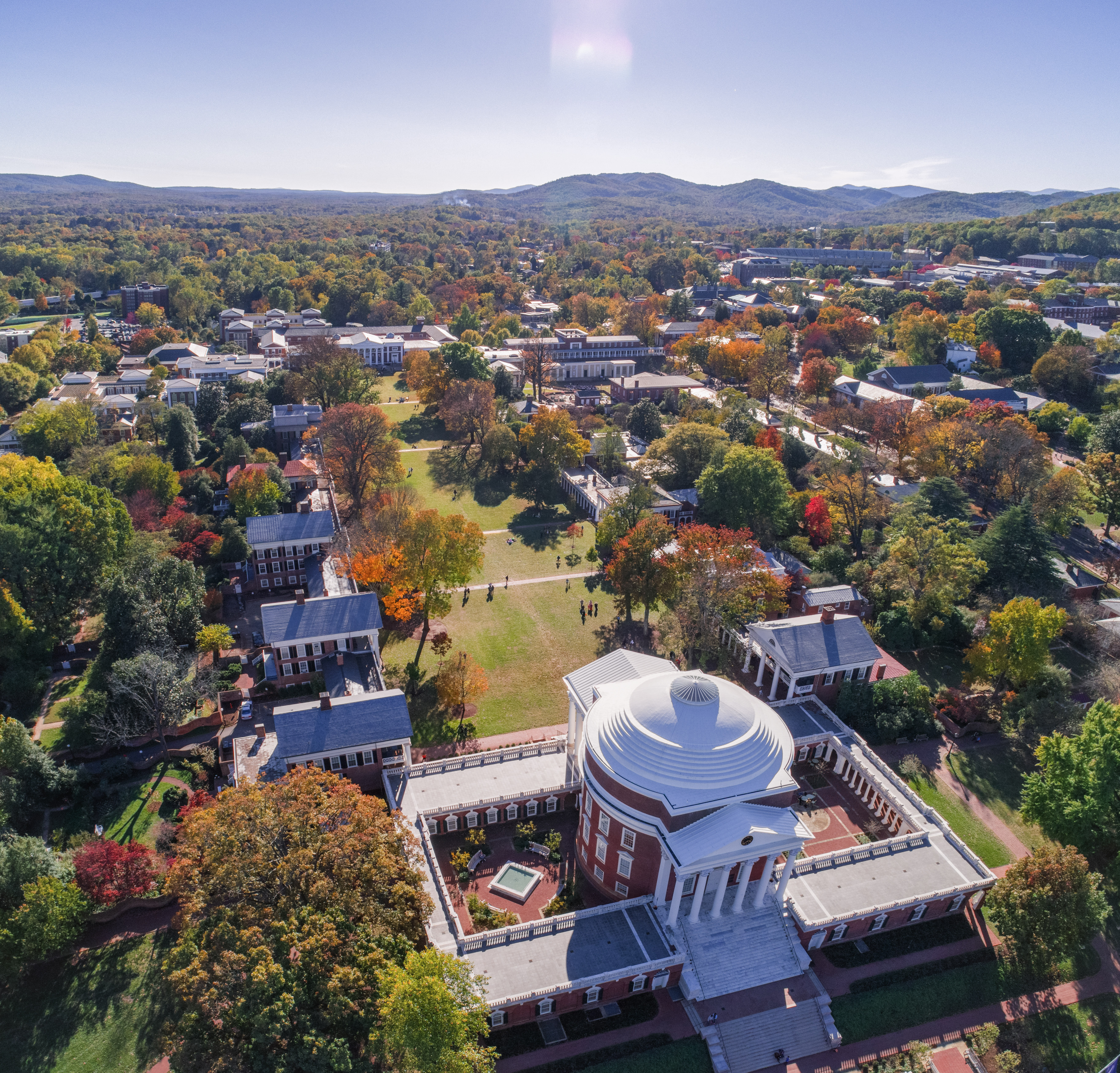
The University of Virginia guarantees full tuition scholarships to all in-state Virginia students with family incomes of $80,000 or less.

As of 2020, Virginia has the eighth-highest percent of residents with bachelor's degrees or higher, with 41.5%. The Department of Education recognizes 163 colleges and universities in Virginia. In the 2022 U.S. News & World Report ranking of national public universities, the University of Virginia is ranked 3rd, the College of William and Mary is 13th, Virginia Tech is 23rd, George Mason University is 65th, James Madison University is 72nd, and Virginia Commonwealth University is 83rd. There are 119 private institutions in the state, including Washington and Lee University and the University of Richmond, which are ranked as the country's 11th and 18th best liberal arts colleges respectively.

Virginia Tech and Virginia State University are the state's land-grant universities, and Virginia State is one of its five historically Black colleges and universities. The Virginia Military Institute is the oldest state military college. Virginia also operates 23 community colleges on 40 campuses which enrolled 199,926 degree-seeking students during the 2021–2022 school year. In 2021, the state made community college free for most low- and middle-income students. George Mason University had the largest on-campus enrollment at 40,390 students as of 2023, though the private Liberty University had the largest total enrollment in the state, with 115,000 online and 15,800 on-campus students in Lynchburg as of 2022.

== Health ==
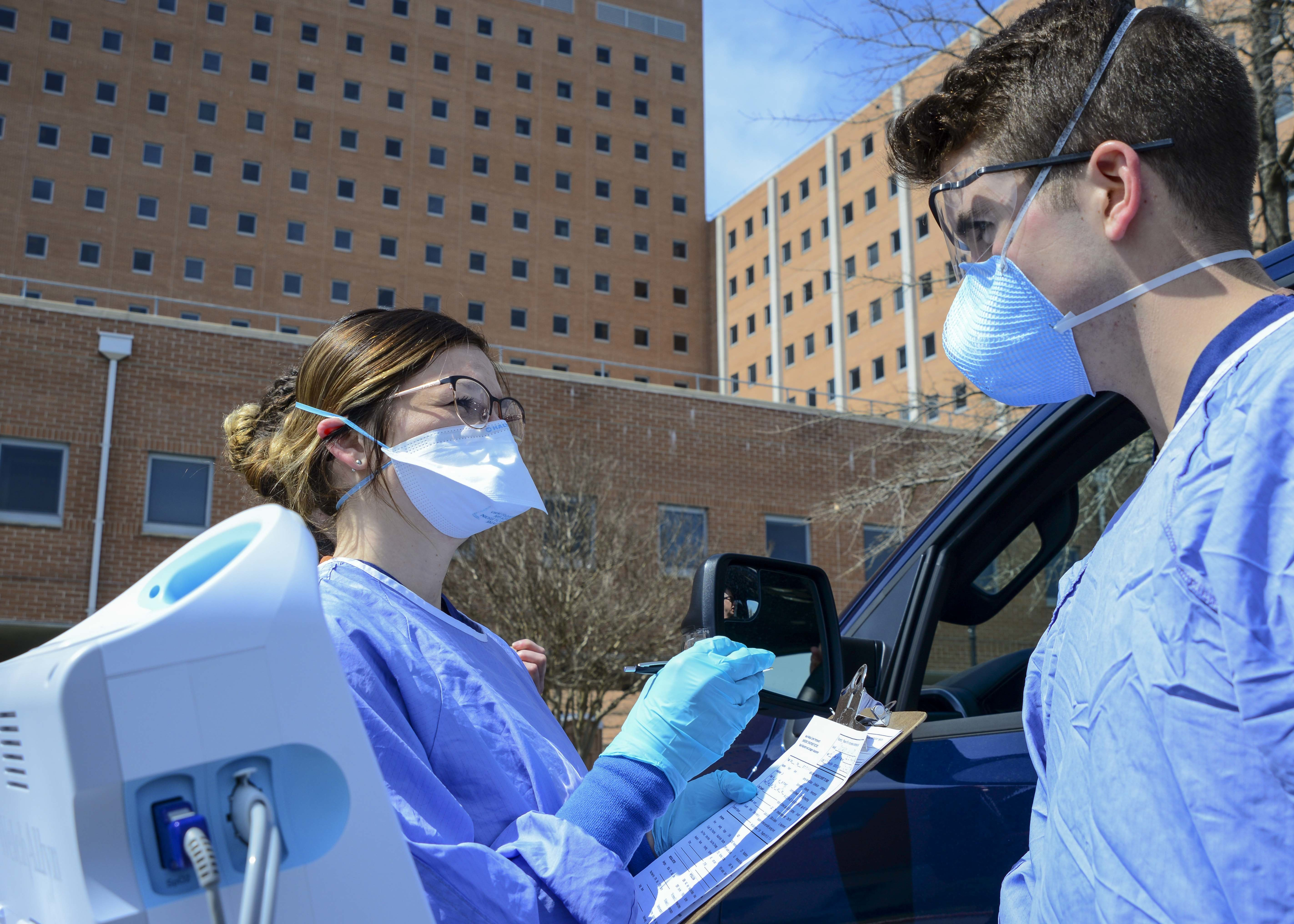
Patients are screened for COVID-19 outside Naval Medical Center Portsmouth, the Navy's oldest continuously operating hospital.

Virginia was ranked best for its physical environment in the 2024 United Health Foundation's Health Rankings, but 15th for its overall health outcomes and only 23rd for residents' healthy behaviors. Among U.S. states, Virginia has the 20th-lowest rate of premature deaths, with 8,146 per 100,000, and an infant mortality rate of 5.61 per 1,000 live births. The rate of uninsured Virginians dropped to 6.4% in 2024, following an expansion of Medicare in 2019. Falls Church and Loudoun County were both ranked in the top ten healthiest communities in 2020 by U.S. News & World Report.

With high rates of heart disease and diabetes, African Americans in Virginia have an average life expectancy over four years below the state's average, and over ten less than Asian-American and Hispanic Virginians, and were disproportionately affected by the coronavirus pandemic. African-American mothers are also three times more likely to die while giving birth. Mortality rates among White middle-class Virginians have also been rising, with drug overdose, alcohol poisoning, and suicide as leading causes. Suicides in the state increased over 14% between 2009 and 2023, while deaths from drug overdoses more than doubled. Virginia has a ratio of 274.3 primary care physicians per 10,000 residents and only 273.1 mental health providers per that number, both 14th worst nationwide. A December 2023 report by the General Assembly found that all nine public mental health care facilities were over 95% full, causing overcrowding and delays in admissions.

Weight is an issue for many Virginians: 32.2% of adults and 14.9% of 10- to 17-year-olds are obese as of 2021, 35% of adults are overweight, and 23.3% do not exercise regularly. Smoking in bars and restaurants was banned in January 2010, and the percent of tobacco smokers in the state has declined from 19% in that year to 12.1% in 2023, but an additional 7.7% use e-cigarettes. The percentage of adults who receive annual immunizations is above average, as 48.1% get their yearly flu vaccination. In 2008, Virginia became the first U.S. state to mandate the HPV vaccine for girls for school attendance, and 62.9% of adolescents have the vaccine as of 2024.

The Virginia Board of Health regulates healthcare facilities. There are 88 hospitals in Virginia with a combined 17,024 hospital beds as of 2023. The largest in both Virginia and the Washington metropolitan area is Inova Fairfax Hospital, which serves over 55,000 patients annually. VCU Medical Center, where a new 16-story children's hospital was opened in 2023, is highly ranked for pediatrics, while UVA Medical Center is highly ranked for its cancer care, and the state numbers in the top ten for annual cancer screenings. Sentara Norfolk General Hospital, a teaching institution of Eastern Virginia Medical School, was the site of the first successful U.S. in-vitro fertilization program, and around 2.5% of births in the state are due to IVF.

== Media ==
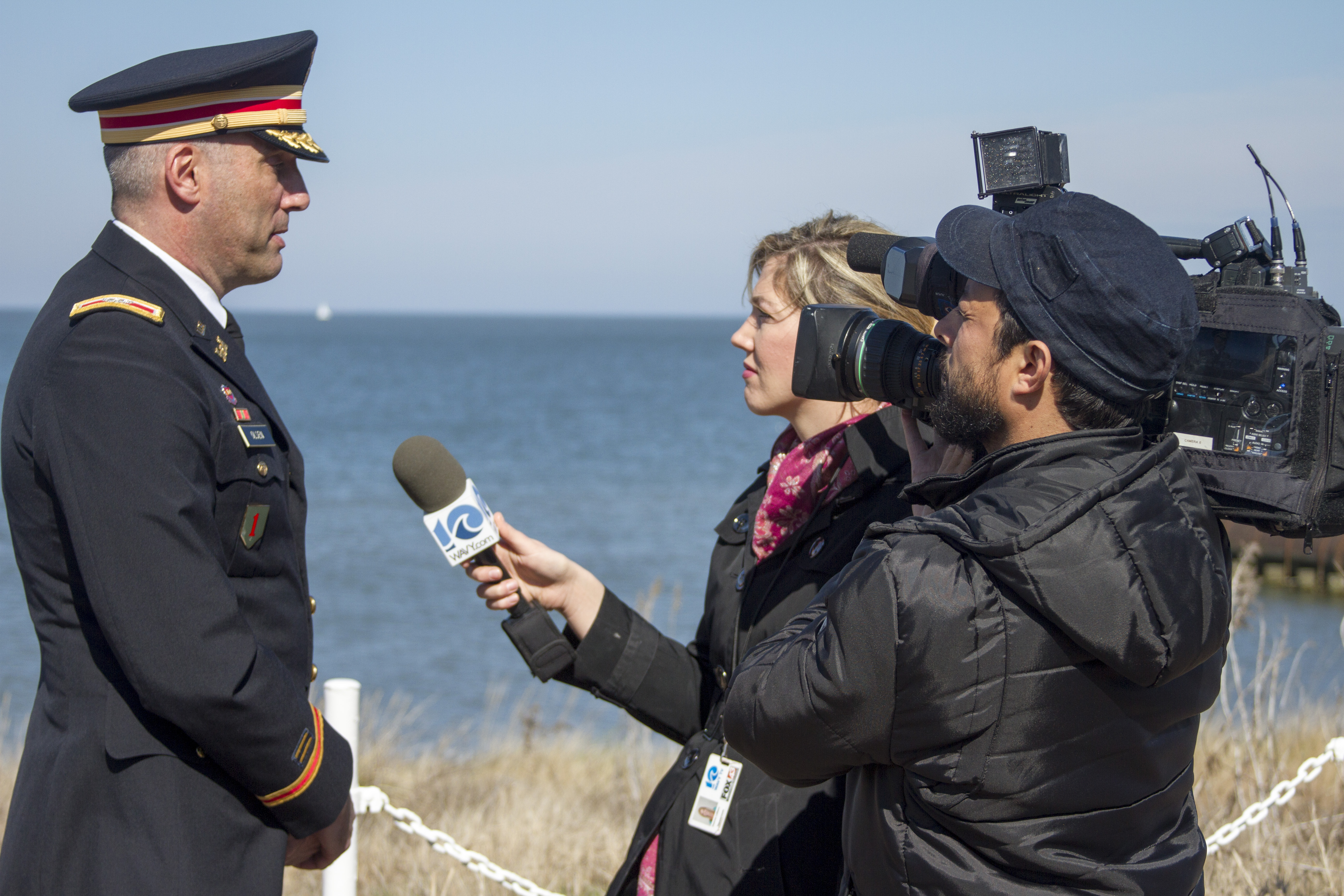
Journalists from WAVY-TV reporting on a coastal storm damage reduction project in Norfolk

The Hampton Roads area is the 44th-largest media market in the United States as ranked by Nielsen Media Research, while the Richmond-Petersburg area is 56th and Roanoke-Lynchburg is 71st as of 2022. Northern Virginia is part of the much larger Washington, D.C. media market, which is the country's ninth-largest.

There are 36 television stations in Virginia, representing each major U.S. network, part of 42 stations which serve Virginia viewers including those broadcasting from neighboring jurisdictions. There are 595 FCC-licensed FM radio stations broadcast in Virginia and 239 AM stations as of 2020. The nationally available Public Broadcasting Service (PBS) is headquartered in Arlington. Independent PBS affiliates exist throughout Virginia, and the Arlington PBS member station WETA-TV produces programs such as the PBS NewsHour and Washington Week.

The most circulated native newspapers in the Commonwealth are Norfolk's The Virginian-Pilot with around 132,000 subscribers, the Richmond Times-Dispatch with 86,219, and The Roanoke Times as of 2018. USA Today, which is headquartered in McLean, has seen its daily subscription number decline significantly from over 500,000 in 2019 to just over 180,000 in 2021, but is still the third-most circulated paper nationwide. USA Today is the flagship publication of Gannett, Inc., which merged with GateHouse Media in 2019, and operates over 100 local newspapers nationwide. In Northern Virginia, The Washington Post is the dominant newspaper and provides local coverage for the region. Politico and Axios, which both cover national politics, have their headquarters in Arlington.

== Transportation ==
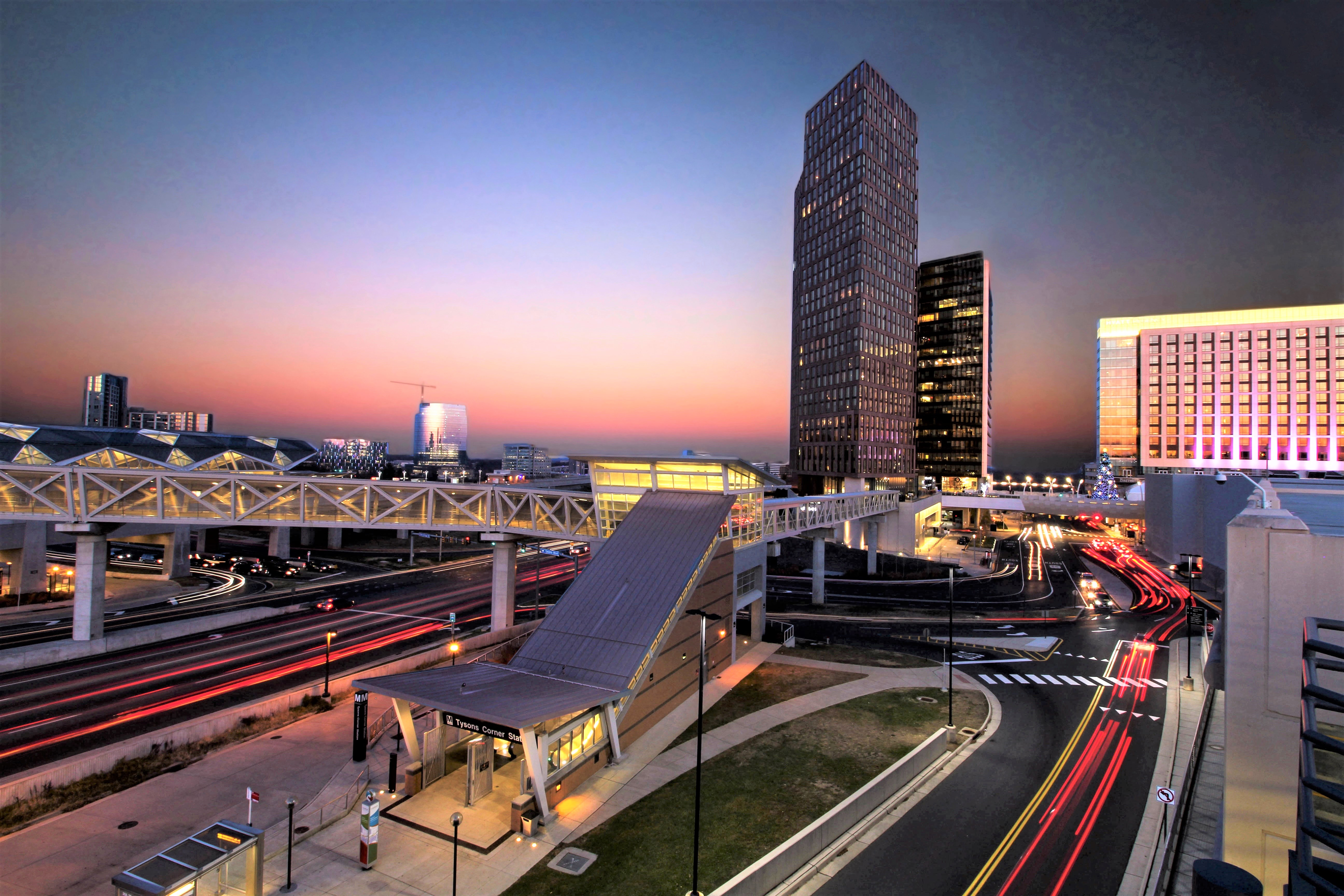
The Silver Line extension of the Washington Metro system opened in Tysons in 2014.

Because of the 1932 Byrd Road Act, the state government controls most of Virginia's roads, instead of a local county authority as is usual in other states. As of 2018, the Virginia Department of Transportation (VDOT) owns and operates 57,867 miles (93,128 km) of the total 70,105 miles (112,823 km) of roads in the state, making it the third-largest state highway system.

Traffic on Virginia's roads is among the worst in the nation according to the 2019 American Community Survey. The average commute time of 28.7 minutes is the eighth-longest among U.S. states, and the Washington Metropolitan Area, which includes Northern Virginia, has the second-worst rate of traffic congestion among U.S. cities. About 68.4% of workers in Virginia reported driving alone to work in 2024, the 15th-lowest percent in the U.S., while 8.2% reported carpooling, and Virginia hit peak car usage before the year 2000, making it one of the first such states.

=== Mass transit and ports ===
About 3.4% of Virginians commute on public transit, and there were over 171.9 million public transit trips in Virginia in 2019, over 62% of which were done on the Washington Metro transit system, which serves Arlington and Alexandria, and extends into Loudoun and Fairfax Counties. Commuter buses include the Fairfax Connector, FRED buses in Fredericksburg, and OmniRide in Prince William County, while the state-run Virginia Breeze buses run four inter-city routes from Washington, D.C. to Bristol, Blacksburg, Martinsville, and Danville. VDOT operates several free ferries throughout Virginia, the most notable being the Jamestown Ferry which connects Jamestown to Scotland Wharf across the James River.

Virginia has Amtrak passenger rail service along several corridors, and Virginia Railway Express (VRE) maintains two commuter lines into Washington, D.C. from Fredericksburg and Manassas. VRE experienced a dramatic decline in ridership due to the COVID-19 pandemic, with daily ridership dropping from over 18,000 in 2019 to 6,864 in February 2024. Amtrak routes in Virginia have however passed their pre-pandemic levels and served 123,658 passengers in March 2024. Norfolk operates a light rail system called The Tide, servicing about 2,300 people per day. Major freight railroads in Virginia include Norfolk Southern and CSX Transportation, and in 2021 the state finalized a deal to purchase 223 miles (359 km) of track and over 350 miles (560 km) of right of way from CSX for future passenger rail service.

Virginia has five major airports: Dulles International and Reagan Washington National in Northern Virginia, both of which handle over 20 million passengers a year, Richmond International southeast of the state capital, Newport News/Williamsburg International Airport, and Norfolk International. Several other airports offer limited commercial passenger service, and sixty-six public airports serve the state's aviation needs. The Virginia Port Authority's main seaports are those in Hampton Roads, which carried 61,505,700 short tons (55,797,000 t) of total cargo in 2021, the sixth most of United States ports. The Eastern Shore of Virginia is the site of Wallops Flight Facility, a rocket launch center owned by NASA, and the Mid-Atlantic Regional Spaceport, a commercial spaceport. Space tourism is also offered through Vienna-based Space Adventures.

== Sports ==
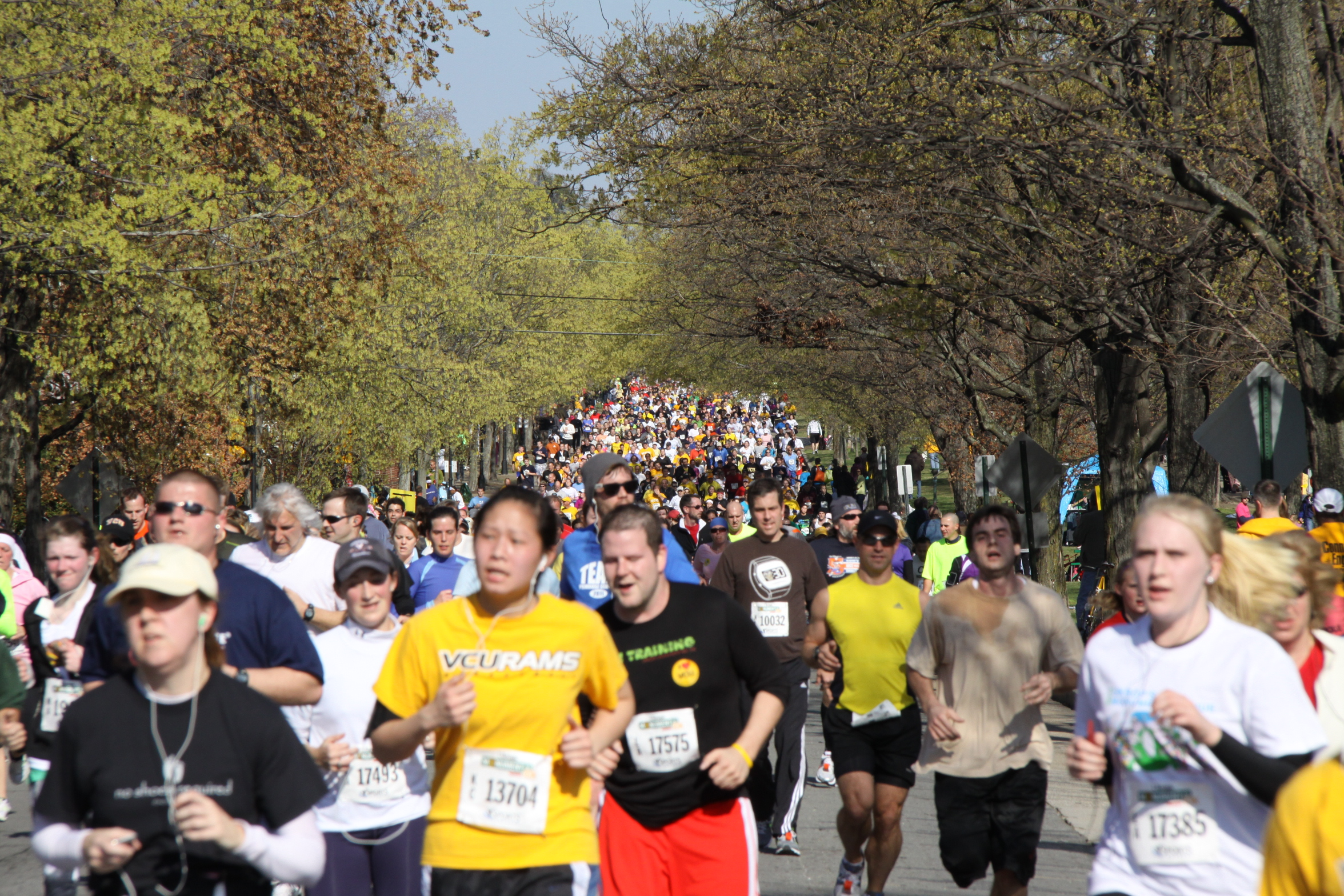
The annual Monument Avenue 10K in Richmond, one of the ten largest timed long-distance running races in the U.S.

Virginia is the most populous U.S. state without a major professional sports league franchise. The reasons for this include the lack of any dominant city or market within the state and the proximity of teams in Washington, D.C., Baltimore, Charlotte, and Raleigh, as well as a reluctance to publicly finance stadiums. A proposed $220 million NBA arena in Virginia Beach lost the support of the city council there in 2017, while a 2023 proposal to move the NBA's Washington Wizards and the NHL's Washington Capitals to Alexandria was canceled after opposition in the Virginia Senate.

Five minor league baseball and two mid-level hockey teams play in Virginia. Norfolk is host to two: The Triple-A Norfolk Tides and the ECHL's Norfolk Admirals. The Double-A Richmond Flying Squirrels began playing at The Diamond in 2010, while the Fredericksburg Nationals, Lynchburg Hillcats, and Salem RidgeYaks play in the Carolina League. Loudoun United FC, the reserve team of D.C. United, debuted in the USL Championship in 2019, while the Richmond Kickers of the USL League One have operated since 1993 and are the only team in their league to win both the league championship and the U.S. Open Cup in the same year. The training facilities for both the Washington Commanders and Washington Spirit are in Loudoun County, while the Washington Capitals practice at MedStar Capitals Iceplex in Ballston.

Hampton Roads has produced several Olympic gold medalists, including Gabby Douglas, the first African American to win gymnastics individual all-around gold, and LaShawn Merritt, Francena McCorory, and Michael Cherry, who have all won gold in the 4 × 400 meters relay. Noah Lyles, winner of the 100 meter dash at the 2024 Olympics, grew up in Alexandria. Major long-distance races in the state include the Richmond Marathon, the Blue Ridge Marathon on the Parkway, and the Monument Avenue 10K. Virginia's professional caliber golf courses include Kingsmill Resort outside Williamsburg, which hosts an LPGA Tour tournament in May, and the Country Club of Virginia outside Richmond, which hosts a charity classic on the PGA Tour Champions in October. Notable PGA Tour winners from Virginia include Sam Snead and Curtis Strange. NASCAR currently schedules Cup Series races on two tracks in Virginia: Martinsville Speedway and Richmond Raceway. Notable drivers from Virginia in the series have included Jeff Burton, Ward Burton, Denny Hamlin, Wendell Scott and Curtis Turner.

=== College sports ===
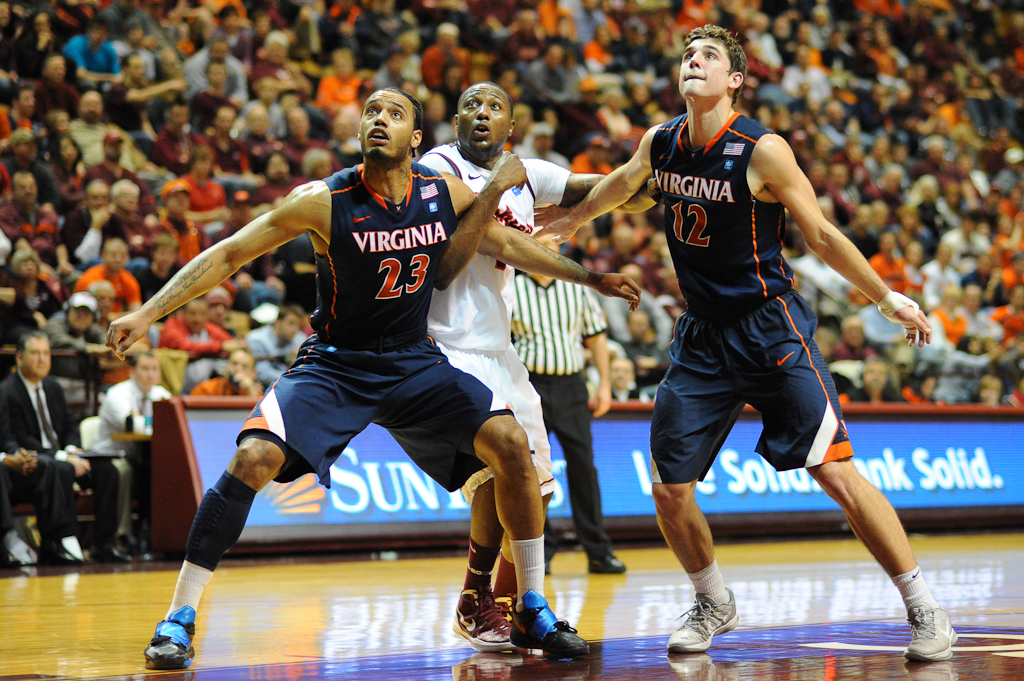
Mike Scott and Joe Harris of the Virginia Cavaliers battle Cadarian Raines of the Virginia Tech Hokies for a rebound in a college basketball game at Cassell Coliseum in Blacksburg.

Several of Virginia's collegiate sports programs have attracted strong followings, with a 2015 poll showing that 34% of Virginians were fans of the Virginia Cavaliers and 28% were fans of the rival Virginia Tech Hokies, making both more popular than the surveyed regional professional teams. The men's and women's college basketball programs of the Cavaliers, VCU Rams, and Old Dominion Monarchs have combined for 66 regular season conference championships and 49 conference tournament championships between them as of 2023. The Hokies football team sustained a 27-year bowl streak between 1993 and 2019; James Madison Dukes football won FCS NCAA Championships in both 2004 and 2016. The overall UVA men's athletics programs won the national Capital One Cup in both 2015 and 2019, and led the Atlantic Coast Conference in NCAA championships.

Fourteen universities in total compete in NCAA Division I, with multiple programs each in the Atlantic Coast Conference, Atlantic 10 Conference, Big South Conference, and Coastal Athletic Association. Three historically Black schools compete in the Division II Central Intercollegiate Athletic Association, and two others (Hampton and Norfolk State) compete in Division I. Several smaller schools compete in the Old Dominion Athletic Conference and the USA South Athletic Conference of NCAA Division III. The NCAA currently holds its Division III championships in football, men's basketball, volleyball, and softball in Salem. State appropriated funds are not allowed to be used for either operational or capital expenses for intercollegiate athletics.

=== High school sports ===
Virginia is also home to several of the nation's top high school basketball programs, including Paul VI Catholic High School and Oak Hill Academy, the latter of which has won nine national championships. In the 2022–2023 school year, 176,623 high school students participated in 14 girls sports and 13 boys sports managed by the Virginia High School League, with the most popular sports being football, outdoor track and cross country, soccer, basketball, baseball and softball, and volleyball. Outside of the high school system, 145 youth soccer clubs operate in the Virginia Youth Soccer Association, under the USYS system, as of 2024.

== State symbols ==
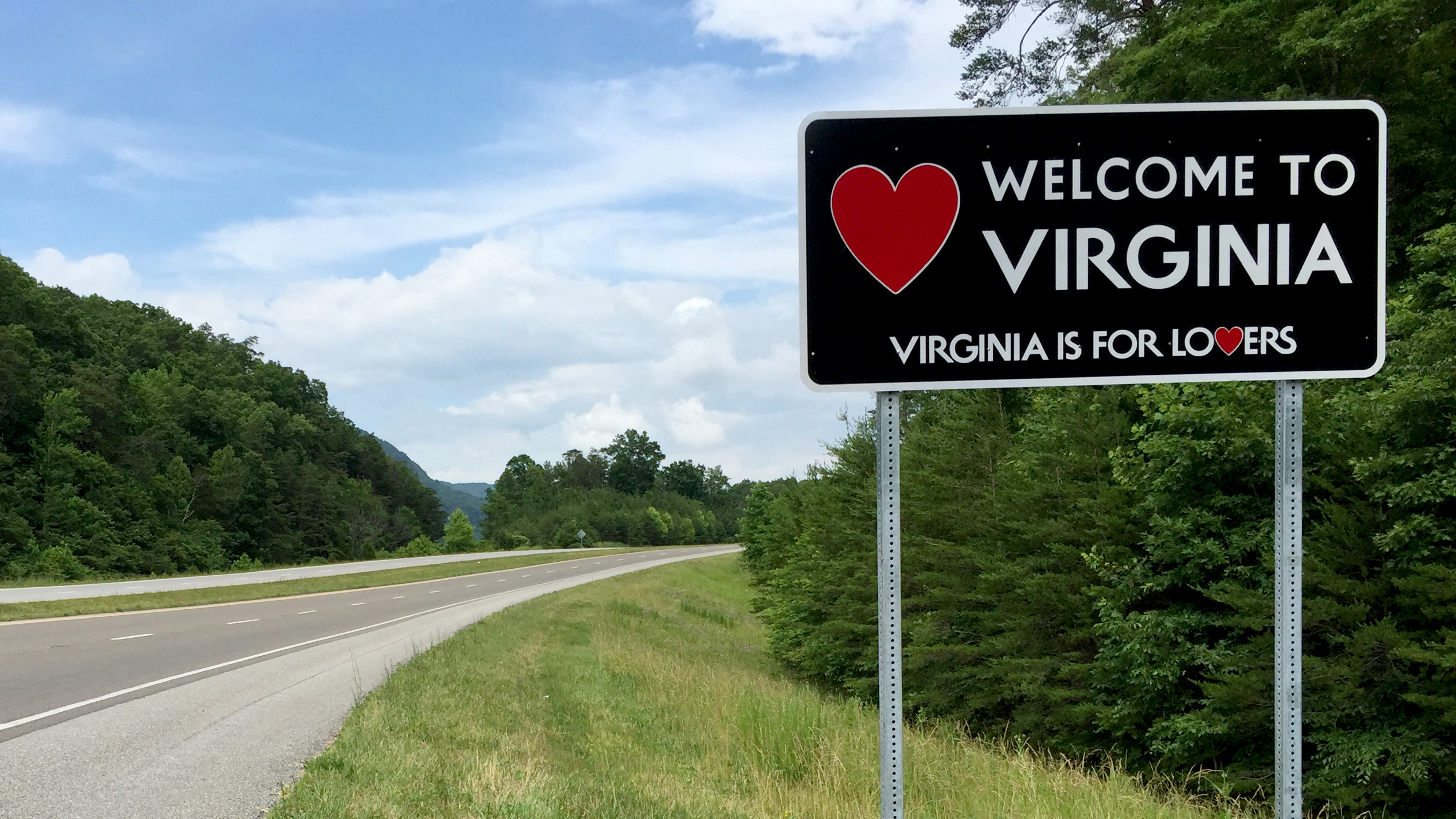
The state slogan, "Virginia Is for Lovers", has been used since 1969 and is featured on state welcome signs.

Virginia has several nicknames, the oldest of which is the "Old Dominion". King Charles II of England first referred to "our auntient Collonie of Virginia" one of "our own Dominions" in 1662 or 1663, perhaps choosing this language because Virginia was home to many of his supporters during the English Civil War. These supporters were called Cavaliers, and the nickname "The Cavalier State" was popularized after the American Civil War. Virginia has also been called the "Mother of Presidents", as eight Virginians have served as President of the United States, including four of the first five.

The state's motto, Sic Semper Tyrannis, translates from Latin as "Thus Always to Tyrants", and is used on the state seal, which is then used on the flag. While the seal was designed in 1776, and the flag was first used in the 1830s, both were made official in 1930. In 1940, "Carry Me Back to Old Virginny" was named the state song, but it was retired in 1997 due to its nostalgic references to slavery. In March 2015, Virginia's government named "Our Great Virginia", which uses the tune of "Oh Shenandoah", as the traditional state song and "Sweet Virginia Breeze" as the popular state song.

- Beverages: Milk, Rye Whiskey
- Boat: Chesapeake Bay deadrise
- Bird: Cardinal
- Dance: Square dancing
- Dog: American Foxhound
- Fish: Brook trout, striped bass
- Flower/Tree: Dogwood
- Fossil: Chesapecten jeffersonius
- Insect: Tiger swallowtail
- Mammal: Virginia big-eared bat
- Motto: Sic Semper Tyrannis
- Nickname: The Old Dominion
- Pony: Chincoteague pony
- Shell: Eastern oyster
- Slogan: Virginia is for Lovers
- Songs: "Our Great Virginia", "Sweet Virginia Breeze"
- Tartan: Virginia Quadricentennial

== See also ==
- Index of Virginia-related articles
- Outline of Virginia

== Bibliography ==
- Accordino, John J. (2000). Captives of the Cold War Economy. Westport, CT: Greenwood Publishing Group. ISBN 978-0-275-96561-7.
- Anderson, Fred (2000). Crucible of War: The Seven Years' War and the Fate of Empire in British North America, 1754–1766. New York: Random House. ISBN 978-0-375-40642-3.
- Berkeley, William; Billings, Warren M.; Kimberly, Maria E. (2007). The Papers of Sir William Berkeley, 1605-1677. Library of Virginia. ISBN 978-0-88490-207-2.
- Bryson, Bill (2011). Home: A Short History of Private Life. New York: Anchor Books. ISBN 978-0-7679-1939-5.
- Burnham, Bill; Burnham, Mary (2018). Hiking Virginia: A Guide to Virginia's Greatest Hiking Adventures. Guilford, CT: Globe Pequot. ISBN 978-1-4930-3127-6.
- Carroll, Steven; Miller, Mark (2002). Wild Virginia: A Guide to Thirty Roadless Recreation Areas Including Shenandoah National Park. Guilford, CT: Globe Pequot. ISBN 978-0-7627-2315-7.
- Chambers, Douglas B. (2005). Murder at Montpelier: Igbo Africans in Virginia. Jackson: University Press of Mississippi. ISBN 978-1-57806-706-0.
- Conlin, Joseph R. (2009). The American Past: A Survey of American History. Belmont, CA: Thomson Learning. ISBN 978-0-495-56609-0.
- Cooper, Jean L. (2007). A Guide to Historic Charlottesville and Albemarle County, Virginia. Charleston, SC: The History Press. ISBN 978-1-59629-173-7.
- Dailey, Jane Elizabeth; Gilmore, Glenda Elizabeth; Simon, Bryant (2000). Jumpin' Jim Crow: Southern Politics from Civil War to Civil Rights. Princeton, NJ: Princeton University Press. ISBN 978-0-691-00193-7.
- Davis, David Brion (2006). Inhuman Bondage: The Rise and Fall of Slavery in the New World. New York: Oxford University Press. ISBN 978-0-19-514073-6.
- Egloff, Keith; Woodward, Deborah B. (2006). First People: The Early Indians of Virginia. University of Virginia Press. ISBN 978-0-8139-2548-6.
- Feuer, A.B. (1999). The U.S. Navy in World War I: combat at sea and in the air. Westport, CT: Greenwood Publishing Group. ISBN 978-0-275-96212-8.
- Fischer, David Hackett; Kelly, James C. (2000). Bound Away: Virginia and the Westward Movement. Charlottesville: University of Virginia Press. ISBN 978-0-8139-1774-0.
- Goodwin, Bill (2012). Frommer's Virginia (11 ed.). Hoboken, NJ: John Wiley & Sons. ISBN 978-1-118-22449-6.
- Gordon, John Steele (2004). An Empire of Wealth: The Epic History of American Economic Power. New York: HarperCollins. p. 17. ISBN 978-0-06-009362-4.
- Gray, Richard J.; Robinson, Owen (2004). A Companion to the Literature and Culture of the American South. Oxford: Wiley-Blackwell. ISBN 978-0-631-22404-4.
- Grizzard, Frank E.; Smith, D. Boyd (2007). Jamestown Colony: a political, social, and cultural history. Santa Barbara, CA: ABC-CLIO. ISBN 978-1-85109-637-4.
- Gutzman, Kevin R. C. (2007). Virginia's American Revolution: From Dominion to Republic, 1776–1840. Lanham, MD: Lexington Books. ISBN 978-0-7391-2131-3.
- Hamilton, John (August 15, 2016). Virginia. ABDO. ISBN 978-1-6807-7453-5.
- Hashaw, Tim (2007). The Birth of Black America. New York: Carroll & Graf Publishers. ISBN 978-0-7867-1718-7.
- Heinemann, Ronald L.; Kolp, John G.; Parent, Anthony S. Jr.; Shade, William G. (2007). Old Dominion, New Commonwealth. Charlottesville: University of Virginia Press. ISBN 978-0-8139-2609-4.
- Hoffer, Peter Charles (2006). The Brave New World: A History of Early America. Baltimore: JHU Press. ISBN 978-0-8018-8483-2.
- Howard, Blair; Burnham, Mary; Burnham, Bill (2006). The Virginia Handbook (3 ed.). Edison, NJ: Hunter Publishing. ISBN 978-1-58843-512-5.
- Jaffa, Harry V. (2000). A New Birth of Freedom: Abraham Lincoln and the Coming of the Civil War. Oxford: Rowman & Littlefield Publishers. ISBN 978-0-8476-9952-0.
- Jordan, Ervin L. (1995). Black Confederates and Afro-Yankees in Civil War Virginia. Charlottesville, VA: University of Virginia Press. ISBN 978-0-8139-1545-6.
- Joseph, John Earl (2006). Language and Politics. Edinburgh: Edinburgh University Press. ISBN 978-0-7486-2453-9.
- Ketchum, Richard M. (2014). Victory at Yorktown: The Campaign That Won the Revolution. New York: Henry Holt and Co. ISBN 978-1-46687-953-9.
- Library of Virginia (1994). The Hornbook of Virginia History. Library of Virginia. ISBN 978-0-88490-177-8.
- Miller, Kerby A.; Schrier, Arnold; Boling, Bruce D.; Doyle, David N. (2003). Irish immigrants in the land of Canaan. New York: Oxford University Press. ISBN 978-0-19-504513-0.
- Moran, Michael G. (2007). Inventing Virginia: Sir Walter Raleigh and the Rhetoric of Colonization, 1584–1590. New York: Peter Lang. ISBN 978-0-8204-8694-9.
- Morgan, Lynda (1992). Emancipation in Virginia's Tobacco Belt, 1850–1870. Athens, GA: University of Georgia Press. ISBN 978-0-8203-1415-0.
- Morgan, Philip D. (1998). Slave Counterpoint. Chapel Hill: University of North Carolina Press. ISBN 978-0-8078-4717-6.
- Palmer, Tim (1998). America by Rivers. Washington, D.C.: Island Press. ISBN 978-1-55963-264-5.
- Pazzaglia, Frank James (2006). Excursions in Geology and History: Field Trips in the Middle Atlantic States. Boulder, CO: Geological Society of America. ISBN 978-0-8137-0008-3.
- Pinn, Anthony B. (2009). African American Religious Cultures. Santa Barbara, CA: ABC-CLIO. ISBN 978-1-57607-470-1.
- Olitzky, Kerry (1996). The American Synagogue: A Historical Dictionary and Sourcebook. Westport, CT: Greenwood Press. ISBN 978-0-313-28856-2.
- Robertson, James I. (1993). Civil War Virginia: Battleground for a Nation. Charlottesville: University of Virginia Press. ISBN 978-0-8139-1457-2.
- Scott, David L.; Scott, Kay W. (2004). Guide to the National Park Areas. Guilford, CT: Globe Pequot. ISBN 978-0-7627-2988-3.
- Shefveland, Kristalyn Marie (2016). Anglo-Native Virginia: Trade, Conversion, and Indian Slavery in the Old Dominion, 1646-1722. Athens: University of Georgia Press. ISBN 978-0-8203-5025-7.
- Smith, Gary Alden (2015). State and National Boundaries of the United States. Jefferson, North Carolina: McFarland. ISBN 978-1-47660-434-3.
- Smith, Julian (2008). Moon Virginia: Including Washington, D.C. (4 ed.). Berkeley, CA: Avalon Travel. ISBN 978-1-59880-011-1.
- Stewart, George (2008). Names on the Land: A Historical Account of Place-Naming in the United States. New York: Random House. ISBN 978-1-59017-273-5.
- Styron, Alexandra (2011). Reading My Father: A Memoir. New York: Simon and Schuster. ISBN 9-781-4165-9506-9.
- Tarter, Brent (2020). Virginians and Their Histories. Charlottesville: University of Virginia Press. ISBN 978-0-8139-4393-0.
- Van Zandt, Franklin K. (1976). Boundaries of the United States and the several States. U.S. Government Printing Office. p. 95.
- Vollmann, William T. (2002). Argall: The True Story of Pocahontas and Captain John Smith. New York: Penguin Group. ISBN 978-0-14-200150-9.
- Wallenstein, Peter (2007). Cradle of America: Four Centuries of Virginia History. Lawrence, KS: University Press of Kansas. ISBN 978-0-7006-1507-0.
- Welch, Deborah (2006). Virginia: An Illustrated History. Hippocrene Books. ISBN 978-0-7818-1115-6.
- Williamson, CiCi (2008). The Best of Virginia Farms Cookbook and Tour Book. Birmingham, AL: Menasha Ridge Press. ISBN 978-0-89732-657-5.

Preceded by New Hampshire	List of U.S. states by date of admission to the Union; Ratified Constitution on June 25, 1788 (10th)	Succeeded by New York
