= Venue in Virginia civil procedure =

'Venue' in Virginia civil procedure describes the rules governing which court in the Commonwealth of Virginia is the appropriate place for a case to be tried, presuming that subject matter jurisdiction and personal jurisdiction have been established.

== Category A and Category B venue ==
Where personal jurisdiction lies in multiple districts, the appropriate venue for the case to be heard is set forth by Virginia statutes, which divides possible venues as "Category A" (preferred) and "Category B" (permissible), and requires that Category B venue may only be used where no Category A venue is available.

For example, in a dispute over the ownership of land, Category A venue lies where the land is located. Where the dispute involves a request for injunctive relief, venue lies in the place where the activity to be enjoined is occurring or is anticipated to occur.

Category B venue is much more expansive. It generally lies where the defendant resides or has their principal place of employment, or has a registered office or registered agent, or where some part of the action arose. It also lies in any place where the cause of action, or a part thereof, arose.

If there are multiple parties, and any party requires Category A venue, then that venue will suffice for all parties; and if no party requires Category A venue, then any place where Category B venue lies as to one party will suffice as to all parties. In any case, if venue is inappropriate, then an objection to venue must be made within 21 days of service of process, and such objection must state why venue is improper, and where proper venue lies. A successful objection to venue will result in the case being transferred to the court where venue is proper, unless the court finds good cause to keep the case. A failure to object to venue waives the issue.

Where a matter is brought in a place where one defendant resides, if that defendant is dismissed out of the case, the remaining plaintiffs can seek a transfer to a different court if they can demonstrate that the dismissed party was improperly joined, or that the dismissed party was joined only to create venue. Where all defendants are from out of the state, venue is proper where the plaintiff resides (but not simply where the plaintiff has a principal place of business), or if there are multiple plaintiffs, where any plaintiff resides.

Virginia law requires that service of process must itself inform the defendant of their right to object to venue.

== Objections to venue ==
The timing for the filing of a motion objecting to venue depends on the level of court in which the case has been brought. An objection to venue in the Virginia Circuit Court must be filed (actually physically received in the clerk's office) within 21 days of service of process, absent a general extension of time from the court to file a responsive pleading. An objection to venue in the less formal Virginia General District Court may be filed any time up to the day of the trial itself.

Such objection must state both why venue is improper, and where proper venue lies; a motion that fails to include both statements may be denied, although the court has the discretion to transfer the case even if the motion is defective. A successful objection to venue will result in the case being transferred to the court where venue is proper, unless the court finds good cause to keep the case. Factors that the court will consider in determining if venue is proper include the convenience of the parties and the witnesses, and the location of the evidence. A court may also enforce a provision in a forum selection clause whereby the parties have agreed to a particular venue. A failure to object to venue waives the issue.

== Forum non conveniens dismissal ==
A Virginia court may dismiss a case altogether on a motion of forum non conveniens if it can be shown that a far better venue for the case lies in another state. The Virginia court has no power to transfer a case to a court outside of Virginia.
