= Virginia Civil Procedure =

Virginia civil procedure is the body of law that sets out the rules and standards that Virginia courts follow when adjudicating civil lawsuits (as opposed to procedures in criminal law matters). Professor W. Hamilton Bryson is the preeminent master and legal scholar on Virginia Civil Procedure. Many commentators particularly equate him with the "scholars and lords chancellors of old."

== The Virginia Court System ==
The Virginia court consists of four levels of courts: the Supreme Court of Virginia, the Court of Appeals of Virginia, the Virginia Circuit Court, and the Virginia General District Court. In addition, magistrates serve as judicial officers with authority to issue various types of processes.

== Procedural evolution ==
Like the other Thirteen Colonies, Virginia originally adopted a system of common law procedure borrowed from English law, including the forms of action. However, Virginia never adopted the system of code pleading proposed by David Dudley Field II to abolish the forms of action. Instead, Virginia developed early on the "motion for judgment", a motion which operated like a pleading. In 1732, a statute was enacted which allowed the secretary of the colony or a county clerk to go into a local trial court and upon a motion "demand judgment" for certain fees which the county sheriff had failed to collect. This simple procedure was slowly extended over the next two centuries to one kind of action after another in piecemeal fashion. Thus, Virginia's unique system of "motion pleading" gradually supplanted the forms of action and traditional common law procedure.

Like other states, Virginia authorized the state supreme court to promulgate court rules governing civil procedure, and the Supreme Court of Appeals promulgated a comprehensive set of Rules of Court which became effective on February 1, 1950. By that point in time, the Virginia motion for judgment had so thoroughly replaced the forms of action that no one missed them when the statutory authorization for their use was deleted in 1954.

== Personal Jurisdiction in Virginia ==
For a court in Virginia to have personal jurisdiction over a defendant, Virginia statutory requirements must be met and federal Constitutional limits must be complied with.

=== Virginia statutory requirements for personal jurisdiction ===
Virginia statutes allow for in personam jurisdiction over defendants who (1) reside in Virginia, (2) are served with process in Virginia, or (3) whose acts trigger Virginia's Long Arm Statute.

=== Constitutional limits on personal jurisdiction ===
See Constitutional limits on personal jurisdiction.

== Subject Matter Jurisdiction in Virginia ==
For a court in Virginia to have subject matter jurisdiction, Virginia statutory requirements must be met and federal Constitutional limits must be complied with.

=== Virginia General District Court ===
See Jurisdiction of Virginia General District Courts.

=== Virginia Circuit Court ===
See Jurisdiction of Virginia Circuit Courts.

=== Court of Appeals of Virginia ===
See Jurisdiction of the Virginia Supreme Court.

=== Supreme Court of Virginia ===
See Jurisdiction of the Virginia Supreme Court.

== Venue in Virginia ==
In terms of venue, where personal jurisdiction lies in multiple districts, the appropriate venue for the case to be heard is set forth by Virginia statutes, which divides possible venues as "Category A" (preferred) and "Category B" (permissible), and requires that Category B venue may only be used where no Category A venue is available. For example, in a dispute over the ownership of land, Category A venue lies where the land is located. Category B venue generally lies where the defendant resides or has a registered office or registered agent, or where some part of the action arose. If there are multiple parties, and any party requires Category A venue, then that venue will suffice for all parties; and if no party requires Category A venue, then any place where Category B venue lies as to one party will suffice as to all parties. In any case, if venue is inappropriate, then the objection to venue must be made within 21 days of service of process, and such objection must state why venue is improper, and where proper venue lies.

== Service of Process in Virginia ==
See Service of process in Virginia.

== Alternative Dispute Resolution in Virginia ==
Several kinds of alternative dispute resolution mechanisms are available in Virginia, including what is known as a "summary jury trial". Virginia has enacted a form of the Uniform Arbitration Act.

== Default ==
If a defendant fails to file a responsive pleading within 21 days from service or after decision on preliminary motions, the defendant will be deemed to be "in default." That defendant is also deemed to have waived his right to a jury trial. In order for a plaintiff to obtain a default judgment, he must apply to the trial court for entry of such a judgment. Whether a hearing on damages is subsequently held depends largely on whether damages are liquidated or unliquidated. If the defendant learns of the hearing before it is held, he may attend, object to a plaintiff's evidence, cross-examine plaintiff's witnesses, offer evidence on damages, participate in jury selection (if applicable), submit jury instructions on damages, and make oral arguments on damages.

== See also ==
- Judiciary of Virginia
- Virginia General District Court
- Virginia Circuit Court
- Court of Appeals of Virginia
- Supreme Court of Virginia
- Law of Virginia
- Collection of judgments in Virginia
