= Government of Virginia =

State government of the United States

- Logo of the Virginian government Great Seal of the Commonwealth of Virginia
- Polity type: Presidential System
- Constitution: Constitution of Virginia

Legislative branch
- Name: General Assembly
- Type: Bicameral
- Meeting place: Virginia State Capitol
- Upper house
- Name: Senate
- Presiding officer: Ghazala Hashmi, President
- Lower house
- Name: House of Delegates
- Presiding officer: Don Scott, Speaker

Executive branch
- Head of state and government
- Title: Governor
- Currently: Abigail Spanberger
- Appointer: Election
- Cabinet
- Name: Governor's Cabinet
- Leader: Governor
- Deputy leader: Lieutenant Governor
- Headquarters: State Capitol

Judicial branch
- Name: Judiciary of Virginia
- Courts: Courts of Virginia
- Supreme Court of Virginia
- Chief judge: Cleo Powell
- Seat: Richmond

The government of Virginia combines the executive, legislative and judicial branches of authority in the Commonwealth of Virginia. The current governor of Virginia is Abigail Spanberger. The State Capitol building in Richmond was designed by Thomas Jefferson, and the cornerstone was laid by Governor Patrick Henry in 1785. Virginia currently functions under the 1971 Constitution of Virginia. It is Virginia's seventh constitution. Under the Constitution, the government is composed of three branches: the legislative, the executive and the judicial.

== Executive branch ==
The statewide elected officials are governor, lieutenant governor, and attorney general.

All three officers are separately elected four-year terms in years following presidential elections (2017, 2021, 2025, etc.) and take office in January of the following year. Virginia is one of only five states that elects its state officials in odd numbered years (the others are Kentucky, Louisiana, Mississippi, and New Jersey). The last gubernatorial election was in 2025, and the next will occur in 2029.

The governor is chief executive officer of Virginia and as commander-in-chief of its militia. The Constitution does not allow a governor to succeed himself in office (though a governor is allowed to serve multiple non-consecutive terms). The lieutenant governor, who is not elected on the same ticket as the governor, is president of the Senate of Virginia and is first in the line of succession to the governor. The lieutenant governor is allowed to run for reelection. The attorney general is chief legal advisor to the governor and the General Assembly, chief lawyer of Virginia, and the head of the Department of Law. The attorney general is second in the line of succession to the governor. Whenever there is a vacancy in all three executive offices of governor, lieutenant governor, and attorney general, then the speaker of the Virginia House of Delegates becomes governor.

Abigail Spanberger, a Democrat, is the Governor. The Lieutenant Governor is Ghazala Hashmi, a Democrat, and is Virginia's first Asian-American and Muslim Lt. Governor, and Virginia's attorney general, Jay Jones, is a Democrat and the first African-American elected to the office.

=== Cabinet ===
The Virginia Governor's Cabinet is a body of the most senior appointed officers of the executive branch, responsible for advising the governor. It is composed of the following offices, nominated by the governor and then presented to the Virginia General Assembly for confirmation:

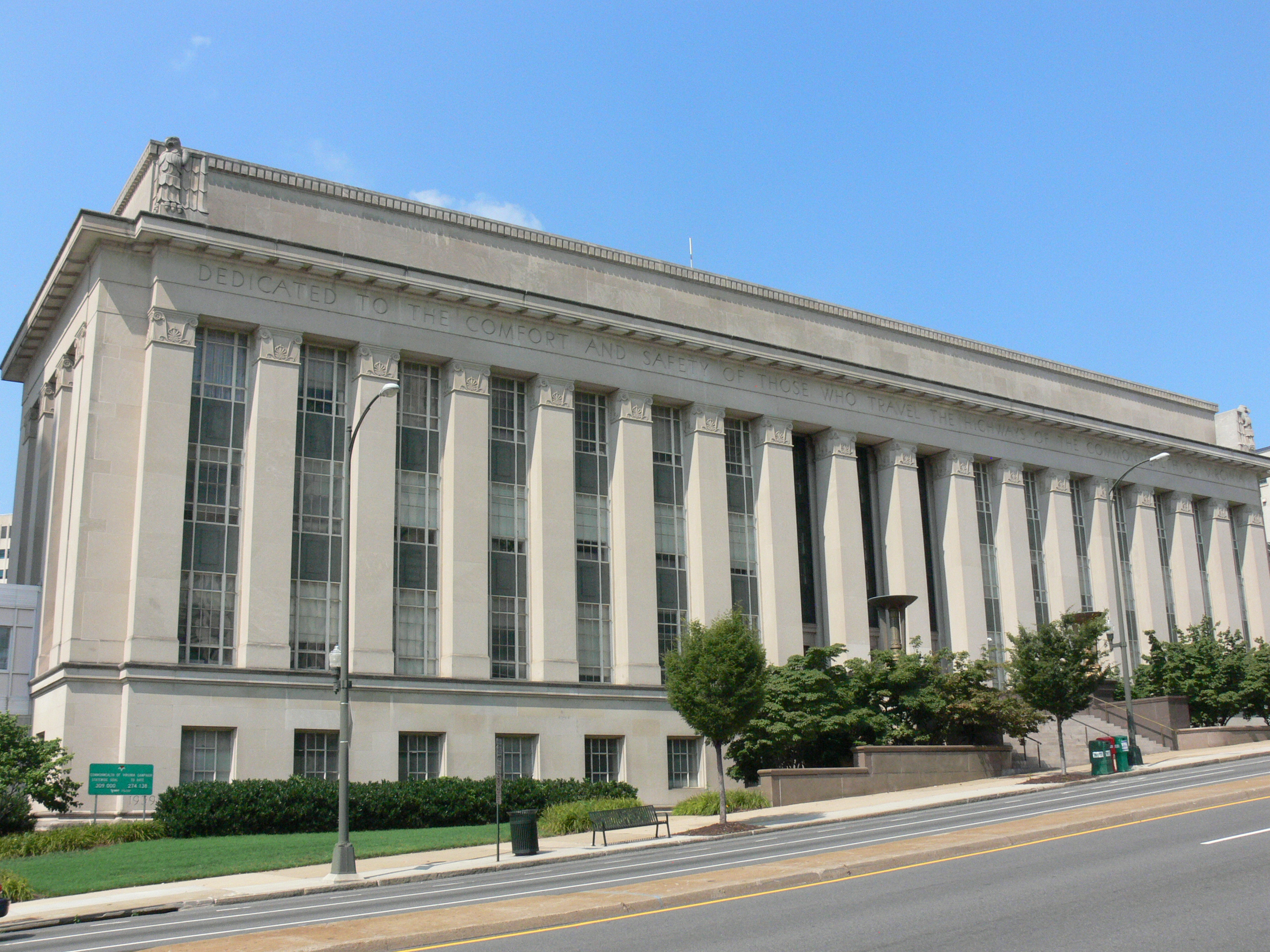
The Virginia Department of Highways Building in Richmond, headquarters of the Department of Transportation

- Chief of Staff
- Deputy Chief of Staff
- Secretary of the Commonwealth
- Secretary of Administration
- Secretary of Agriculture and Forestry
- Secretary of Commerce and Trade
- Secretary of Education
- Secretary of Finance
- Secretary of Health and Human Resources
- Secretary of Natural Resources
- Secretary of Public Safety and Homeland Security
- Secretary of Transportation
- Secretary of Veterans and Defense Affairs

Many executive branch agencies have the authority to promulgate regulations. Proposals to create or amend state regulations are often subject to review by the executive branch.

== Legislative branch ==
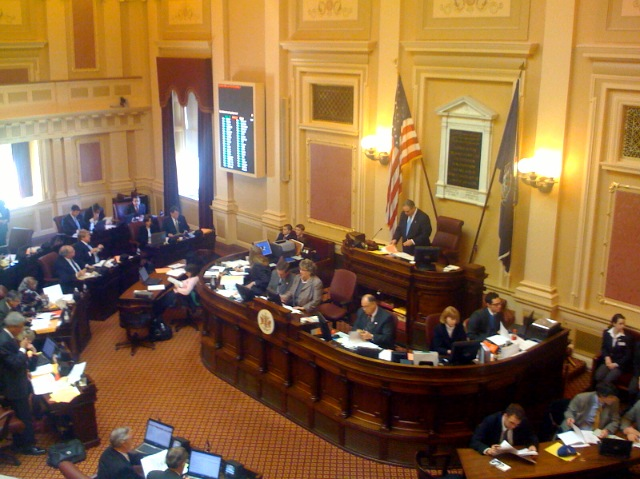
The Senate chamber of the Virginia State Capitol

The legislative branch or state legislature is the General Assembly. The General Assembly is a bicameral body consisting of a lower house, the Virginia House of Delegates, with 100 members, and an upper house, the Senate of Virginia, with 40 members. Combined, the General Assembly consists of 140 elected representatives from an equal number of constituent districts across Virginia. The General Assembly holds sessions in the Virginia State Capitol in Richmond.

The House of Delegates is presided over by the speaker of the House, while the Senate is presided over by the lieutenant governor of Virginia. The House and Senate each elect a clerk and sergeant-at-arms. The Senate of Virginia's clerk is known as the clerk of the Senate (instead of as the secretary of the Senate, the title used in the United States Senate). The General Assembly also selects the Virginia's auditor of public accounts. The statutory law enacted by the General Assembly is codified in the Code of Virginia.

== Judiciary ==
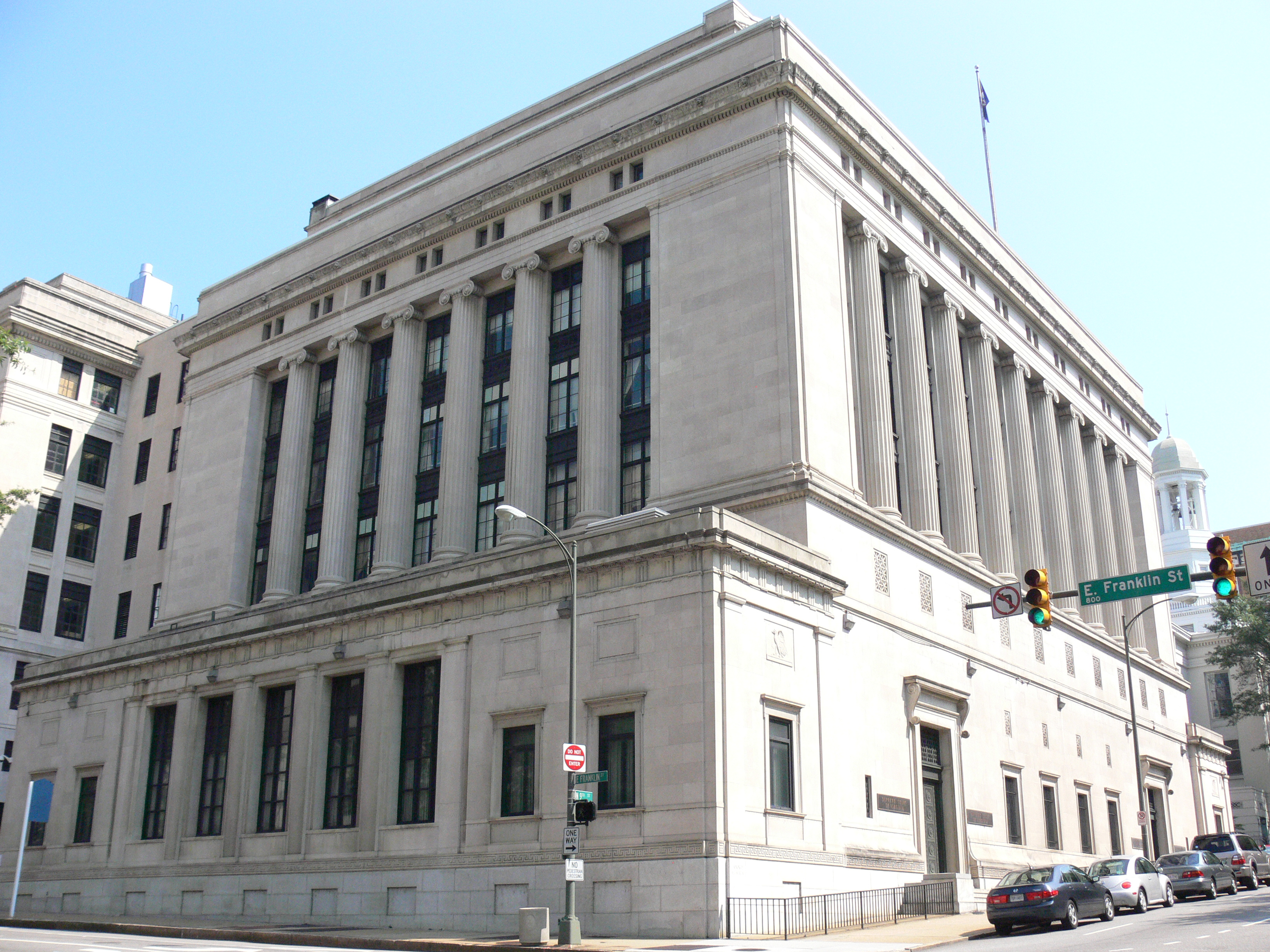
The Supreme Court building in Richmond

The judiciary of Virginia is defined under the Constitution and law of Virginia and is composed of the Supreme Court of Virginia and subordinate courts, including the Court of Appeals, the Circuit Courts, and the General District Courts. Its administration is headed by the chief justice of the Supreme Court, the Judicial Council, the Committee on District Courts, the Judicial Conferences, and various other officers.

== Local government ==
The political subdivisions of Virginia are the areas into which the state is divided for political and administrative purposes. In Virginia, the political subdivisions have only the legal powers specifically granted to them by the General Assembly and set forth under the Code of Virginia.

Some are local governments; others are not. However, all local governments (cities, counties, and incorporated towns) are political subdivisions of the state. All public school divisions are political subdivisions of the state, although each has local and some controlling relationships of varying types with the counties, cities and/or towns they serve. Some political subdivisions are defined geographically; others by function. Many authorities (such as water, or transportation districts) are created by specific legislation as political subdivisions of the state.

=== Structure and authority ===
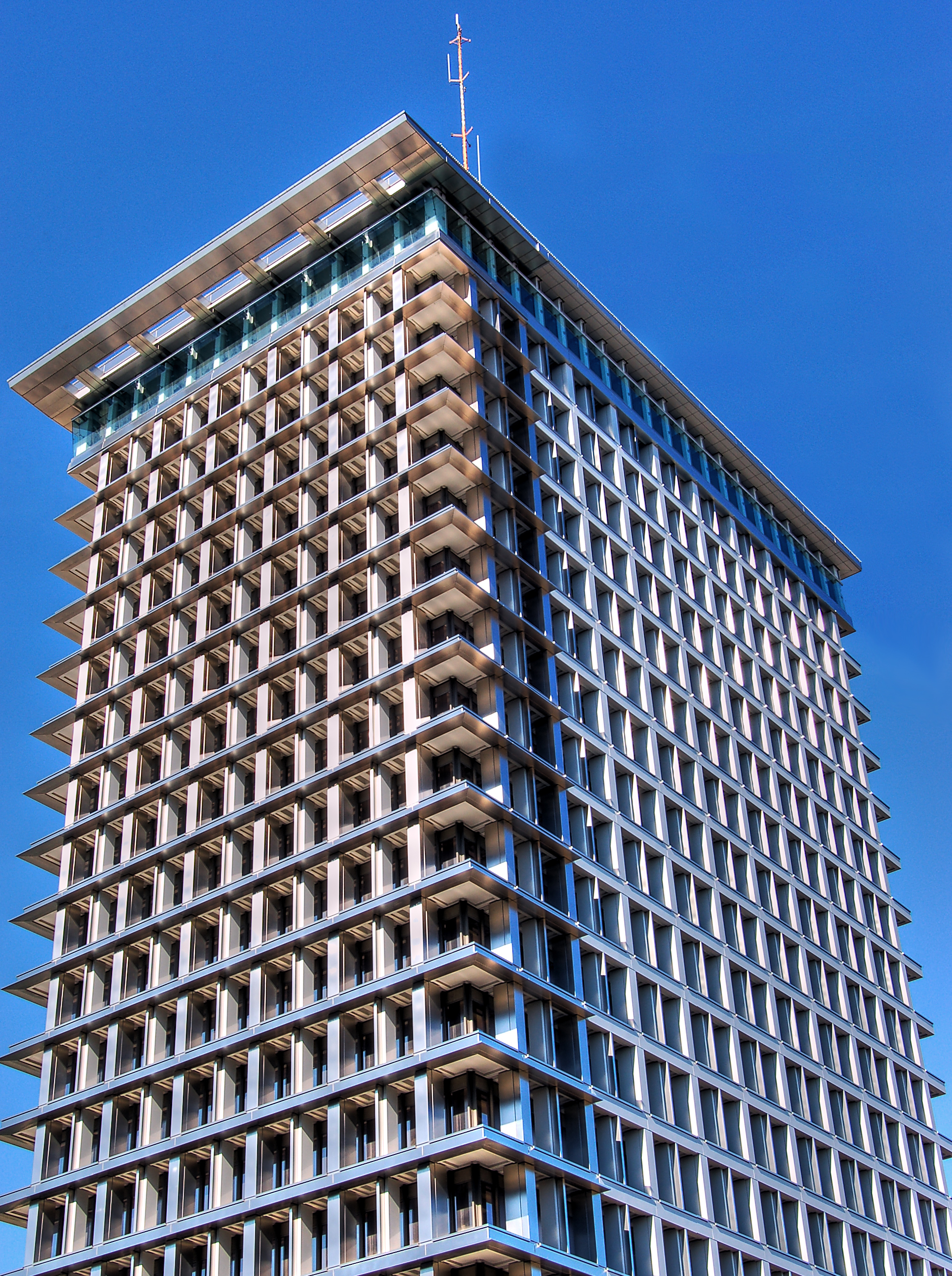
Richmond City Hall

Every location in Virginia is within a county or an independent city, but never both. The 95 counties and the 39 independent cities all have their own governments. Cities are governed by an elected mayor or city council which choose a city manager or county administrator to serve as a professional, non-political chief administrator under the council-manager form of government, while counties are governed by a county board of supervisors. Many specifics are set forth in "charters", specific legislation adopted by the General Assembly. Other forms of local government are also provided by statute.

Virginia limits the authority of cities and counties to enact ordinances by what is known as the Dillon's Rule. Counties and cities may only pass laws expressly allowed by the state legislature or which are necessary to effect powers granted by the state. Dillon's Rule will invalidate local ordinances that exceed authority granted by the state.

There are exceptions to the general structure for counties and cities, notably the City of Richmond, which has a popularly elected mayor who is chief executive separate from the city council, an innovative arrangement which has caused some local turmoil under the first mayor so elected, former Governor Douglas Wilder. As of November 2007, the courts were in the process of clarifying the duties and powers, and limitations thereupon in response to multiple lawsuits filed by other locally elected officials.

=== Officers ===
The Fairfax County Government Center

Local government consists of city and county officers, as well as people who are known as constitutional officers. The positions of these constitutional officers are provided for by the Virginia Constitution. Article 7, Section 4 of the Virginia constitution provides, "There shall be elected by the qualified voters of each county and city a treasurer, a sheriff, an attorney for the Commonwealth, a clerk, who shall be clerk of the court in the office of which deeds are recorded, and a commissioner of revenue." The local constitutional offices are not appointed by the city or county. The judges of the Circuit Court, the General District Court and the Juvenile and Domestic Relations District Court are appointed by the state legislature. The constitutional officers have salaries set by the state through its compensation board, although the locality may supplement the salaries. This structure allows those officers a measure of independence within the local government setting.

Virginia's attorney is the elected prosecuting attorney for the locality. The sheriff is the law enforcement officer for localities without a police department. Where a police department has been established, the sheriff remains authorized to enforce the criminal laws. The sheriff, however, is responsible for the operation of the local jail, courthouse security and service of civil papers and may also execute criminal warrants.

== History ==
Founded in 1619, the Virginia General Assembly is still in existence as the oldest legislature in the New World. In colonial Virginia, the lower house of the legislature was called the House of Burgesses. Together with the Governor's Council, the House of Burgesses made up the "General Assembly". The Governor's Council was composed of 12 men appointed by the British monarch to advise the governor. The council also served as the "General Court" of the colony, a colonial equivalent of a Supreme Court. Members of the House of Burgesses were chosen by all those who could vote in the colony. Each county chose two people or burgesses to represent it, while the College of William and Mary and the cities of Norfolk, Williamsburg and Jamestown each chose one burgess. The Burgesses met to make laws for the colony and set the direction for its future growth; the council would then review the laws and either approve or disapprove them. The approval of the Burgesses, the council, and the governor was needed to pass a law. The idea of electing burgesses was important and new. It gave Virginians a chance to control their own government for the first time. At first, the burgesses were elected by all free men in the colony. Women, indentured servants, and Native Americans could not vote. Later the rules for voting changed, making it necessary for men to own at least fifty acres (200,000 m^{2}) of land in order to vote.

Like many other states, by the 1850s Virginia featured a state legislature, several executive officers, and an independent judiciary. By the time of the Constitution of 1901, which lasted longer than any other state constitution, the General Assembly continued as the legislature, the Supreme Court of Appeals acted as the judiciary, and the eight executive officers were elected: the governor, lieutenant governor, attorney general, secretary of the commonwealth, state treasurer, auditor of public accounts, superintendent of public instruction, and commissioner of agriculture and immigration. The Constitution of 1901 was amended many times, notably in the 1930s and 1950s, before it was abandoned in favor of more modern government, with fewer elected officials, reformed local governments and a more streamlined judiciary.

== See also ==
- Politics of Virginia
- Elections in Virginia
- Republican Party of Virginia
- Democratic Party of Virginia
- Law of Virginia
