= 1970 Virginia ballot measures =

The 1970 Virginia State Elections took place on Election Day, November 3, 1970, the same day as the U.S. Senate and U.S. House elections in the state. The only statewide elections on the ballot were four constitutional referendums to amend the Virginia State Constitution. All referendums were referred to the voters by the Virginia General Assembly.

== Question 1 ==
Due to the events of the Civil Rights Movement, several U.S. federal laws, court cases, and the 24th Amendment had nullified large parts of the Virginia State Constitution which had been drafted in 1902. Therefore, Governor A. Linwood Holton Jr. and the Virginia General Assembly collectively decided to call a constitutional convention in order to overhaul the constitution and remove its discriminatory elements. After this measure was passed the Government of Virginia established a Commission on Constitutional Revision which generated the current Virginia State Constitution.

Voters were asked the following question:

"Shall the Constitution be generally amended and revised, as agreed to by the General Assembly at its 1969 and 1970 sessions (except for the three proposals separately stated below)?"

Question 1
Choice	Votes	%
For	576,776	71.83
Against	226,219	28.17
Total	802,995	100.00
Source: - Official Results

== Question 2 ==
This amendment asked voters to repeal Section 60 (which prohibits lotteries) and leave it to the General Assembly to decide whether or not to authorize or prohibit lotteries.

Question 2
Choice	Votes	%
For	491,124	62.86
Against	290,168	37.14
Total	781,292	100.00
Source: - Official Results

== Question 3 ==
This amendment asked voters to authorize the state government to issue government bonds for specific capital projects. The sum of the debt incurred by these bond measures cannot not exceed 1.15 times the total annual income and sales tax revenues of the Commonwealth. These bond measures must first be approved by a voter referendum in order to take effect.

Question 3
Choice	Votes	%
For	504,315	65.88
Against	261,220	34.12
Total	765,535	100.00
Source: - Official Results

== Question 4 ==
This amendment asked voters to authorize the state government to issue revenue bonds for specific capital projects. Such bonds must first by certified by the Governor that the anticipated revenues from such projects will be sufficient to pay principal and interest as they become due. Such bonds must also have the approval of 2/3s of both chambers in the Virginia General Assembly. The sum of the debt incurred by these bond measures cannot not exceed 1.15 times the total annual income and sales tax revenues of the Commonwealth.

Question 4
Choice	Votes	%
For	484,274	64.56
Against	265,784	35.44
Total	750,058	100.00
Source: - Official Results
