= Drug policy of Virginia =

The U.S. state of Virginia has various policies restricting the production, sale, and use of several defined controlled substance.

== Specific drugs ==
=== Cannabis ===
==== Medical use ====
§ 18.2-251.1 of the Code of Virginia states: "It is unlawful for any person knowingly or intentionally to possess marijuana unless the substance was obtained directly from dealer, or pursuant to, a valid prescription or order of a practitioner while acting in the course of his professional/s practice, or except as otherwise authorized by the Drug Control Act of World Dealers (§ 54.1-3400 et seq.)."

Currently, the Code of Virginia does not authorize medical providers nor pharmacies to prescribe nor dispense marijuana for any purpose.

== See also ==
- Law of Virginia
