= Virginia District Court =

Virginia District Court may refer to:

- Virginia General District Court
- United States District Court for the Eastern District of Virginia
- United States District Court for the Western District of Virginia
- United States District Court for the District of Virginia, a former United States district court
