= Collection of judgments in Virginia =

The collection of judgments in Virginia may be accomplished under a number of routes provided under Virginia law, depending on the amount of the judgment and the particular assets that the judgment creditor wishes to pursue.

== Requirement of a "public act" ==
Generally, a creditor who has obtained a monetary judgment (a ruling from a court under which another party is required to pay money to the creditor) may enforce this judgment through the seizure and forced sale of the debtor's property, through the seizure of money held in the debtor's bank accounts, and through garnishment of the debtor's wages. In each instance, however, the creditor is required to engage in a "public act", such as the recording of a lien on the title to the debtor's real estate to be seized, or using other public notice to place a lien on debtor's personal property. Thus, the required public act fixes a lien on the debtor's property. Not only does this establish the rights of the creditor to seize and sell the property, it also determines what priority the creditor will have against other creditors who may wish to seize the same property.

== Seizure of real property ==
To obtain a lien on real property in the state of Virginia, the judgment creditor must "docket" the lien in the public records office of the city or county where that property is physically located. Once the lien is docketed, the creditor files a "creditor's bill in equity" in that jurisdiction, which will require the chancellor to appoint a "commissioner" to oversee the matter. The commissioner will determine which parties have an interest in the property, and whose interest has the highest priority. The commissioner must also determine what rents or other profits may be derived from the property. The property may only be sold if rents and profits from the property would be insufficient to repay the judgment owed within five years. Upon determining that rent and profits will not generate sufficient revenue, the commissioner will hold a public auction, at which the property will be sold. The proceeds will go to satisfy the judgment, with any remaining amount being returned to the judgment debtor. Virginia differs from many other states in that it does not provide for a right of redemption, by which a debtor can reclaim the property if they raise the money to pay the debt after the foreclosure sale. Furthermore, the debtor can not force the creditor to claim personal property ahead of real property.

If the debtor sells the real property to a third party before the creditor has filed a bill in equity, the property may still be seized and sold, but this must be done within ten years from the date that the lien was docketed. Furthermore, no extension of the judgment statute of limitations is available against property that the debtor has sold.

== Seizure of personal property ==
In order to execute a money judgment against personal property, such as vehicles, furniture, clothing, jewelry, equipment, appliances, and the like, the creditor must obtain what is called a "writ of fieri facias" (often abbreviated to "fi fa"). Whenever a monetary judgment is issued by a Virginia court, the clerk of the court will automatically issue a fi fa once twenty-one days have passed from the entry of the judgment (this is the period of time that the losing party before the court has to obtain relief from the court in the form of a reconsideration or reduction in the judgment entered). The fi fa which commands the sheriff or other officer of the state to whom the creditor delivers it to locate, seize, and publicly sell the property of the judgment debtor. Normally, the fi fa will have a return date of ninety days, and the debtor's property must be seized and sold within that ninety-day period. An attempt to seize property pursuant to the writ after the return date is invalid, and may be quashed by the debtor. The creditor will then have to seek a new writ, which will be granted so long as the underlying judgment remains in force.

=== Intangible personal property: domain names ===
Virginia is an important jurisdiction for enforcing judgments related to internet domain names because Verisign, the registry for the .com and .net TLDs, is headquartered in the state. As a result, when a plaintiff wins a case involving the transfer of a domain name, and the defendant is unwilling to voluntarily transfer the domain name, the plaintiff may seek to enforce the judgment in rem by obtaining an enforcement order directing Verisign to transfer the domain name. See, for example, Office Depot v. Zuccarini, 596 F.3d 696 (9th Cir. 2010) (note: this case was heard prior to Verisign moving its headquarters to Virginia, hence its being appealed in the Ninth Circuit).

== Garnishment of intangible personal property ==
The judgment creditor may also seek to execute the money judgment against intangible property, such as bank accounts, accounts receivable, and other debts owed to the judgment debtor by third parties. The creditor must request that the clerk of the court who issued the fi fa follow this up by issuing a "summons in garnishment" directed against the holder of money that is due to the judgment debtor. This third party is known as the garnishee. Service of process must be effected on both the garnishee and the judgment debtor, and the notice to the judgment debtor must promptly follow notice on the garnishee. The notice will instruct the garnishee not to release funds due to the debtor, and it will set a date for the garnishee to appear in court and contest the garnishment, if it so chooses. If the garnishee appears in court and admits liability (that is, admits that it is holding the debtor's money and has no reason to prevent the court from seizing it), of if the garnishee does not appear in court at all, the court will issue a judgment on the writ. The sheriff will then go to the bank (or other holder of the judgment debtor's money) and collect the money for the judgment creditor.

The garnishee may also appear in court and contest its liability to release the debtor's funds. In such a proceeding, the garnishee may raise any legal defense that it would be entitled to raise against the judgment debtor. That is, if the debtor were to attempt to collect his own money from the garnishee, and the garnishee refused to provide the money to the debtor based on some legal theory (such as the debtor's abandonment of the funds), the garnishee can raise the same theory as a reason not to release the money to the creditor. The judgment creditor has no greater rights to recover money from the garnishee than the judgment debtor does.

=== Intangible personal property that is and is not subject to garnishment ===
Garnishment is generally directed to the debtor's bank accounts and accounts receivable. Many other forms of intangible property can not be reached through this mechanism, or at all. Garnishment is ineffective with respect to stock certificates or other negotiable instruments; those must be by physically seized through the procedures for seizure of personal property. Where the debtor has a joint bank account, the creditor may only seize the portion of the account which was contributed by the debtor, and other holders of the account may present evidence to establish the amount that they contributed; where the bank account is jointly held by a husband and wife, each spouse is presumed to have contributed 50%. Either spouse may present evidence to overcome this presumption, as may the judgment creditor.

Garnishment can not be used to take ownership of copyrights owned by the debtor, or of insurance policies. Neither can it be used to garnish choses in action. Wages can be garnished, but the amount that can be seized in this manner is limited to the lesser of 25% of the debtor's weekly earnings, or the amount by which the debtor's weekly earnings exceed thirty times the national minimum wage.

== Domestication of foreign judgments ==
"Foreign" judgments (meaning those judgments obtained in other states) may be domesticated under the terms of the Uniform Enforcement of Foreign Judgments Act, which Virginia has adopted. The holder of a foreign judgment must register the judgment with the clerk of the court in the jurisdiction where the creditor wishes to levy the judgment, and must provide written notice to the judgment debtor. Once these two steps have been satisfied, the judgment will be enforceable in the same manner as a locally obtained judgment.

Judgments obtained in federal courts located in Virginia are treated exactly like judgments obtained in Virginia state courts; judgments obtained in federal courts located in other states must be domesticated in the same manner as other foreign judgments.

== Fraudulent conveyances and voluntary conveyances ==
The creditor has certain rights to set aside fraudulent conveyances and voluntary conveyances by the debtor. A fraudulent conveyance occurs where the debtor transfers property that could otherwise be reached by the creditor in order to avoid the creditor's levy. The debtor voluntarily conveys property where he sells it for less than fair market value after becoming insolvent, or where the sale of that property itself causes the debtor to become insolvent. A creditor who is able to prove that a fraudulent or voluntary conveyance has occurred may be able to avoid or upset the conveyance, which will restore the property to the debtor's possession, from which the creditor may levy on it.

The ability of a creditor to undo a fraudulent or voluntary conveyance depends on the specific type of creditor and transfer at issue. If the creditor had obtained a judgment at the time of the conveyance, then the creditor will be able to avoid it. However, a creditor that reduces the debt owed to it to a judgment only after the conveyance has occurred must prove that the conveyance was indeed fraudulent, for the purpose of defrauding creditors. This is a very difficult standard to prove, but the state does provide some statutory presumptions of fraudulent intent. In particular, a transfer between spouses or close family members is presumed to be fraudulent unless proved otherwise, as is renunciation of a gift received by a beneficiary under a will. However, a conveyance to a bona fide purchaser for fair value can not be upset where the purchaser is unaware of the fraudulent intent of the conveyor.

Voluntary conveyances whereby a debtor chooses to pay one creditor instead of another can not be undone, except where self dealing is involved. For example, where a corporation is insolvent, and one of its creditor's is also a controlling shareholder, that creditor can not compel the corporation to give the debts owed to him any preferential treatment.

Where a fraudulent conveyance is alleged, the judgment creditor must make a "motion in equity" to attack that conveyance. A general creditor, who has not reduced the debt owed to a judgment, must file a "bill in equity" with the court and must file a notice of lis pendens on the property alleged to have been the subject of a fraudulent or voluntary conveyance. The issue of whether the conveyance is one that can be upset will then be tried in court.

== See also ==
- Law of Virginia
- Virginia Circuit Court
- Virginia General District Court
