= Judiciary of Virginia =

Court system of Virginia

The Judiciary of Virginia is defined under the Constitution and law of Virginia and is composed of the Supreme Court of Virginia and subordinate courts, including the Court of Appeals, the Circuit Courts, and the General District Courts. Its administration is headed by the Chief Justice of the Supreme Court, the Judicial Council, the Committee on District Courts, the Judicial Conferences, the Judicial Inquiry and Review Commission, and various other offices and officers.

== Courts ==
=== Supreme Court ===
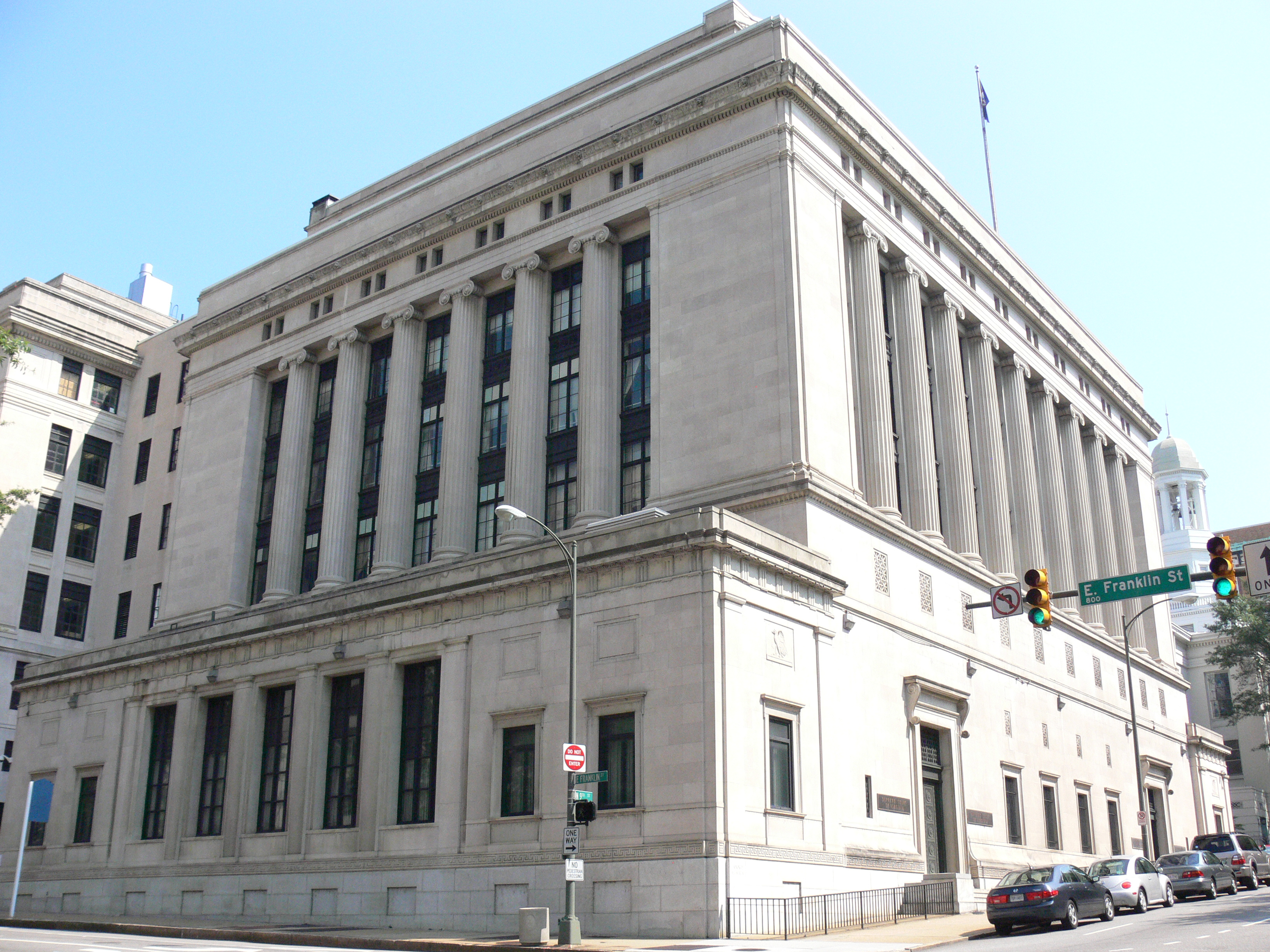
The Supreme Court building in Richmond.

The Supreme Court of Virginia is the highest court in the Commonwealth of Virginia and is made up of seven justices. It primarily hears appeals from the trial-level city and county Virginia Circuit Courts.

Although the Supreme Court of Virginia possesses both original and appellate jurisdiction, its primary function is to review decisions of lower courts, including the Court of Appeals, from which appeals have been allowed. Virginia does not allow an appeal to the Supreme Court as a matter of right except in cases involving the State Corporation Commission, attorney disciplinary actions including the disbarment of an attorney, and review of the death penalty.

The court's original jurisdiction is limited to cases of habeas corpus (ordering one holding custody to produce the detained person before the court for the purpose of determining whether such custody is proper), mandamus (ordering the holder of an office to perform his duty), prohibition (ordering an action stopped in a lower court), and writs of actual innocence pursuant to Virginia's Code § 19.2–327.2. It also has original jurisdiction for challenges to decisions of the State Corporation Commission pursuant to Article IX of the Constitution of Virginia. The Supreme Court also has original jurisdiction in matters filed by the Judicial Inquiry and Review Commission relating to judicial censure, retirement, and removal of judges.

=== Court of Appeals ===
The Court of Appeals of Virginia hears appeals from decisions of Virginia's circuit courts and the Virginia Workers' Compensation Commission. It is composed of eleven judges, and sits in panels of at least three judges, and sometimes hears cases en banc. Appeals from the Court of Appeals go to the Supreme Court of Virginia.

The Court of Appeals has authority to hear appeals as a matter of right from:

- any final judgment, order, or decree of a circuit court involving affirmance or annulment of a marriage, divorce, custody, spousal or child support, or control or disposition of a child, as well as other domestic relations cases;
- any final decision of the Virginia Workers' Compensation Commission (a state agency responsible for handling workers' compensation claims);
- any final decision of a circuit court on appeal from a decision of an administrative agency (example: the Department of Health); and
- any interlocutory order granting, dissolving, or denying an injunction or adjudicating the principles of a cause in any of the cases listed above.

The Court of Appeals has authority to consider petitions for appeal from:

- final orders of conviction in criminal and traffic matters except where a death penalty is imposed;
- final decisions of a circuit court on an application for a concealed weapons permit; and
- certain preliminary rulings in felony cases when requested by the Commonwealth.

The Court of Appeals has original jurisdiction to issue writs of mandamus, prohibition and habeas corpus in any case over which the Court would have appellate jurisdiction. In addition, the Court of Appeals has original jurisdiction to issue a writ of actual innocence upon petition of a person who has been convicted of a felony upon a plea of not guilty.

=== Circuit Courts ===
The Virginia Circuit Courts are the state trial courts of general jurisdiction. The state has 120 Circuit Courts divided among 31 judicial circuits.

In 2025, Virginia's general district courts resolved about 1.0 million criminal and traffic cases and the circuit courts about 68,000. In both, roughly 42–45% of resolved cases did not end in conviction, but by different routes: district courts more often through judicial dismissal, and circuit courts more often through nolle prosequi (the Commonwealth's Attorney declining to proceed).

The Circuit Courts have jurisdiction to hear civil and criminal cases. For civil cases, the courts have authority to try cases with an amount in controversy of more than $4,500 and have exclusive original jurisdiction over claims for more than $50,000. In criminal matters, the Circuit Courts are the trial courts for all felony charges and for misdemeanors originally charged there. The Circuit Courts also have appellate jurisdiction for any case from the Virginia General District Courts (the trial courts of limited jurisdiction in Virginia) claiming more than $50, which are tried de novo in the Circuit Courts.

=== District Courts ===
The Virginia General District Court (GDC) is the lowest level of the Virginia court system, and is the court that most Virginians have contact with. There are 32 General District Court districts, each having at least one judge.

The jurisdiction of the GDC is generally limited to traffic cases and other misdemeanors, civil cases involving amounts of under $50,000.

The GDCs are not courts of record, meaning that they do not keep detailed records of their proceedings and their decisions provide no precedent to be cited in other proceedings. Proceedings before the GDC are less formal than those brought before higher courts in the state. They do not conduct jury trials; cases are heard and decided by the judge. In civil cases, they are only empowered to award legal damages, and generally cannot provide remedies in equity, such as injunctions or declaratory judgments.

==== Juvenile and Domestic Relations District Court ====
The Juvenile and Domestic Relations Court (J&DR court) is the low level court dealing with domestic matters, with each case being heard by a single judge.

It handles all cases involving juvenile crime, child abuse or child neglect, disputes involving custody and visitation, and other family-related matters, as well as cases in which a child or family member is an alleged victim (it can try misdemeanors, but only preliminary hearings in adult felonies). The court also has authority to allow minors, under certain circumstances, to seek abortions. It may also emancipate a child.

== Administration ==
The administration of the courts is headed by the Chief Justice of the Supreme Court. The Uniform Rules and Practices are promulgated by the Supreme Court and govern the practice and procedures to be used in the courts.

By statute, the Chief Justice is chosen by a majority vote of the seven justices of the Supreme Court. The Chief Judge of the Court of Appeals is elected by a vote of the eleven Court of Appeals judges for a term of four years. The state has 120 Circuit Courts divided among 31 judicial circuits. The clerk of the Circuit Court is a constitutional officer and chief administrator of the Circuit Court. There are 32 General District Court districts, each having at least one judge, and each having a clerk of the court and a courthouse. Each district has a chief general district court judge and a chief juvenile and domestic relations district court judge elected by peer vote for a two-year term.

The decisions of the Supreme Court, Court of Appeals, and circuit courts are published in the Virginia Reports, Virginia Court of Appeals Reports, and Virginia Circuit Court Opinions, respectively. Most circuit court decisions are not published. The decisions of the Supreme Court and Court of Appeals are also published in the unofficial South Eastern Reporter.

The Committee on District Courts (CDC) recommends new judgeships, certifies the need to fill district court vacancies, authorizes the number of clerks, magistrates and personnel in each district, establishes guidelines and policies for court system personnel, and fixes salary classification schedules for district court personnel and magistrates. It is composed of the Majority Leader of the Senate, the Speaker of the House, the Chairmen of the Committees for Courts of Justice in the Senate and House of Delegates, two members of each of the Courts of Justice Committees appointed by the respective chairman, one circuit court judge, two general district court judges, and two juvenile and domestic relations district court judges.

The Judicial Conference of Virginia and the Judicial Conference of Virginia for District Courts discuss and consider means and methods of improving the administration of justice in Virginia. The Judicial Council of Virginia is charged with the responsibility of making a continuous study of the organization, rules, and methods of procedure and practice of the judiciary. The council is composed of the Chief Justice as president, one Court of Appeals judge, six circuit court judges, one general district court judge, one juvenile and domestic relations district court judge, two attorneys qualified to practice in the Supreme Court of Virginia, and the Chairmen of the Committees for Courts of Justice in the Virginia Senate and House of Delegates.

The Office of the Executive Secretary (OES) of the Supreme Court provides administrative support for the courts and magistrate offices.

== Officers ==
=== Judges ===
The seven justices of the Supreme Court are elected by a majority vote of both houses of the General Assembly for a term of twelve years. To be eligible for election, a candidate must be a resident of Virginia and must have been a member of the Virginia Bar for at least five years. Vacancies on the court occurring between sessions of the General Assembly may be filled by the Governor for a term expiring thirty days after the commencement of the next session of the General Assembly.

The seventeen Court of Appeals judges are elected by a majority vote of each house of the General Assembly for eight-year terms with interim appointments made by the Governor.

The judges of the Circuit Courts are elected by a majority vote of each house of the General Assembly for eight-year terms with interim appointments made by the Governor.

The judges of the District Courts are elected by a majority vote of each house of the General Assembly for terms of six years, and interim vacancy appointments when the General Assembly is not in session are made by the Circuit Court of the corresponding circuit.

==== Judicial Inquiry and Review Commission ====
The Judicial Inquiry and Review Commission investigates allegations of judicial misconduct or the serious mental or physical disability of a judge. The commission has jurisdiction to investigate the justices of the Supreme Court and all judges of the Commonwealth, as well as members of the State Corporation Commission, the Virginia Workers' Compensation Commission, special justices, substitute judges, and retired judges who have been recalled to service. The Commission may file a formal complaint with the Supreme Court against judges for violations of any canon of judicial ethics, misconduct in office, or failure to perform their judicial duties. The commission has seven members, elected by the General Assembly for four-year terms. Membership includes one circuit court judge, one general district court judge, one juvenile and domestic relations district court judge, two lawyers, and two members of the public who are not lawyers. Commission staff receive and investigate allegations of misconduct and present the findings to the commission.

=== Magistrates ===
Magistrates are judicial officers, appointed by the executive secretary of the Supreme Court. Magistrates have the authority to issue adult arrest process, search warrants, emergency protective orders, emergency medical and mental health orders, and certain civil processes. Magistrates also have authority to determine bail for recently arrested individuals.

=== Special Justices ===
Special justices are judicial officers with authority to issue civil mental health commitment orders, in Virginia district courts.

=== Private attorneys ===
The common law of Virginia permits private attorneys to participate with the government in the prosecution of criminal cases.

=== Clerks ===
The clerk of the circuit court is an elected, constitutional officer and chief administrator of the circuit court. The clerks of other courts are appointed by the office of the executive secretary.

== See also ==
- Government of Virginia
- Law of Virginia
- Law enforcement in Virginia
