= Virginia Workers' Compensation Commission =

The Virginia Workers' Compensation Commission (VWC) is an agency of the U.S. state of Virginia that oversees the resolution of workers' compensation claims brought in that state, in accordance with the Virginia Workers' Compensation Act. The Commission has exclusive jurisdiction to adjudicate such claims. Its decisions may be appealed to the Virginia Court of Appeals. The Commission is led by a Senior Leadership team consisting of three Commissioners, an Executive Director and a Chief Deputy Commissioner. The Commissioners are appointed by the Virginia General Assembly and serve staggered six-year terms. Honorable Robert A. Rapaport, Honorable Wesley G. Marshall and Honorable R. Ferrell Newman currently serve as Commissioners. The Commissioners elect a Chairman for a term of three years. Commissioner Marshall currently serves as Chairman. Ms. Evelyn McGill is the Commission’s Executive Director and Honorable James J. Szablewicz is the Commission’s Chief Deputy Commissioner. The Commission is headquartered in Richmond, Virginia, and has offices and hearing locations at various places around the state.

The Commission is also directed by statute to administer two other programs. One is the Criminal Injuries Compensation Fund, which assists crime victims. The other is the Birth-Related Neurological Injury Program, which assists children who sustained certain kinds of injuries set forth in the statute at birth.

== Authority ==
The Virginia Workers' Compensation Commission is an independent state agency established by the Virginia General Assembly pursuant to authority in the Constitution of Virginia. The General Assembly, through the legislative process, imparts responsibilities upon the Commission. Additionally, the Commission is authorized to issue rules and regulations to help it carry out its statutory responsibilities.

The Workers' Compensation Act provides for the annual payment of a tax up to 3.25 percent of the basic manual insurance premium calculated by applying the manual premium rates effective on January 1 of the calendar year payroll reporting period. The assessment rate may fluctuate from year to year depending on the Commission's operating costs and fund requirements. Assessment rates for 2015 and 2016 are 2.50% for the Administrative Fund, 0.20% for the Uninsured Employer's Fund, and 0.00% for the Second Injury Fund for a total assessment rate of 2.70%. (The respective maximum rates for the three funds are 2.5 percent, .50 percent, and .25 percent.)

The following titles of the Code of Virginia are pertinent to the VWC:

- Title 65.2 - Workers' Compensation Generally
- Title 2.2 - Administration of Government
- Title 8.01 - Civil Remedies and Procedure
- Title 15.2 - Counties, Cities and Towns
- Title 17.1 - Courts of Record
- Title 19.2 - Criminal Procedure
- Title 27 - Fire Protection
- Title 38.2 - Insurance
- Title 45.1 - Mines and Mining
- Title 46.2 - Motor Vehicles
- Title 51.1 - Pensions, Benefits and Retirement
- Title 58.1 - Taxation
- Title 63.2 - Welfare (Social Services)

The following titles of the Virginia Administrative Code contain VWC regulations:

- Title 16 - Labor and Employment
- Title 6 - Criminal Justice and Corrections
- Title 9 - Environment
- Title 11 - Gaming
- Title 12 - Health
- Title 14 - Insurance
- Title 18 - Professional and Occupational Licensing

== History ==
The Virginia Workmen's Compensation Act was enacted on March 21, 1918, over a veto by Governor Westmoreland Davis. Modeled on Indiana's statute, The Act created the Industrial Commission of Virginia and operations began on January 1, 1919.

The Industrial Commission of Virginia published and submitted its first Annual Report to Virginia Governor Westmoreland Davis on October 15, 1919. The report detailed that during the first nine months of operation, 10,920 accidents were reported to the Commission, out of which 144 were death claims. Of 2,911 cases involving claims for compensation, only 73 required adjustments through formal hearings and one claim was appealed from the Commission to the courts.

The Commission was statutorily directed by the General Assembly to administer the Uninsured Employer's Fund (UEF) effective July 1, 1977. The "Virginia Workmen's Compensation Act" was renamed "Virginia Workers' Compensation Act" in 1983. The Commission was statutorily directed by the General Assembly to administer the Birth-Related Neurological Injury Compensation Program which was created by The Virginia Birth-Related Neurological Injury Compensation Act in 1987. On October l, 1991, the Commission was renamed the Virginia Workers' Compensation Commission as part of a general recodification of the Virginia Workers' Compensation Act.

After a pattern of decisions by the Virginia Workers' Compensation Commission and the Court of Appeals of Virginia allowing workers' compensation benefits for workers with repetitive motion injuries, the Virginia Supreme Court issued a ruling prohibiting employees from receiving compensation for those type of injuries on November 5, 1993.

=== Office Locations ===
The Commission's first permanent offices were in Richmond in the Old State Office Building, (now Washington Building) in the Capital Square Complex. The Commission expanded its operations on January 21, 1957, and relocated to a new headquarters office in the Blanton Building (now the Jefferson Building) in Richmond. The Commission, moved to 1000 DMV Drive in midtown Richmond, on November 3, 1984. On December 13, 2017, the Commission began full operations in its new agency headquarters, the former Media General building, located at 333 East Franklin Street in downtown Richmond. The Commission is currently headquartered in this location.

The Commission established regional offices in Lebanon (1980-2016), Bristol (2016-Present), Alexandria (1981-2004), Virginia Beach (1983–Present), Roanoke (1986–Present), Harrisonburg (1996–Present), Manassas (2004-Present), and Fairfax (2004–Present).

== Services provided ==
The VWC is charged with administering the Virginia workers' compensation program, which applies to most employers doing business in Virginia and most employees working in Virginia. Other organizations involved in Virginia workers' compensation program include insurance carriers, group self-insurance associations, professional employer organizations, and third-party administrators. Additionally, various vendors provide services to these organizations. Finally, attorneys represent these parties before the Commission.

The Commission provides various services to these persons and entities. These range from online services that facilitate meeting Commission requirements, to customer assistance services that provide specialized help, to adjudication and mediation services to parties with disputes, and everything in between.

=== Alternative Dispute Resolution ===
In 2013 the Commission created the Alternative Dispute Resolution (ADR) Department to provide an alternative to litigation for the resolution of disputes. Any party to a claim may request alternative dispute resolution or mediation at any time. ADR can involve Issue mediation, Full and Final (Settlement) mediation and/or facilitation. The ADR program does not affect benefits to which an employee, dependents, or survivors may be entitled under the provisions of the Act.

==== Mediation ====
Mediation may be requested in addition to Adjudication.

- Informal, cost-effective means of alternative dispute resolution
- Parties design their own solutions with the help of a Commission mediator
- Parties agree to mutually satisfactory solution
- Appropriate for any medical charge issue
- Initiated by written request filed with Commission in letter format or using the Commission's mediation request form.

=== Services for employers ===
As a general rule, employers with more than two employees in the same business within Virginia are subject to the Virginia Workers' Compensation Act. Employees who suffer on-the-job injuries and diseases may be eligible for workers' compensation benefits. Employers must insure their liability for these benefits through a commercial insurance policy, a self-insurance program, or membership in a professional employer organization or group self-insurance association.

An employee suffering a workplace injury or disease should immediately notify his or her employer.

A report of an accident or disease must be filed with the Commission within ten days of knowledge of the accident or disease. To accomplish this, an employer should immediately notify its insurance carrier about the accident, and the insurance carrier will then file the appropriate reports with the Commission. Insurance carriers file these reports with the Commission electronically.

=== Services for injured workers ===
Employees who suffer on-the-job injuries and diseases may be eligible for benefits under the Virginia Workers' Compensation Act. If injured, an employee (injured worker) should (1) report his/her injury to his/her employer immediately, and (2) file a claim with the Commission no later than two years after the accident. He/she should take similar immediate action if he/she is diagnosed with a work related disease.

=== Services for claim administrators ===
Claim Administrators, or those organizations managing claims activity on behalf of employers and insurance carriers, play a vital role in the Virginia workers' compensation program. Under section 65.2-900 of the Code of Virginia, all workplace accidents that occur in the course of employment must be reported to the Commission. Additionally, certain events and transactions that occur in the course of handling claims relating to these accidents must be reported. The Commission uses electronic data interchange (EDI) to handle these reports.

Claim Administrators may access their files and conduct certain transactions through WebFile, the Commission's web-based file access portal. WebFile is also a tool available for eligible claim administrators seeking to report EDI information.

=== Services for medical providers ===
==== Rights and remedies for medical providers ====
Health care providers play a vital role in the claim process. Accordingly, they have certain rights and remedies available to them under the Virginia Workers' Compensation Act.

Generally, providers become involved in a claim shortly after a work-related accident. Section 65.2-603 of the Code of Virginia requires that the employer provide the claimant with a panel of physicians from which to choose. If the employer does not provide one within a reasonable time, the claimant can choose his own physician. Either way, the physician chosen by the claimant becomes the authorized treating physician. Generally, the following charges may be covered where treatment is related to the compensable injury:

- Charges billed but the authorized treating physician
- Charges billed by a physician to whom the claimant is referred by the authorized treating physician
- Charges for medically necessary treatment and diagnostic measures
- Prescriptions

Once the claimant has filed a claim which covers a specific charge, or once the Commission enters an award of compensation applicable to a charge, the health care provider may not attempt to bill the claimant for any part of the charge. However, if the Commission rules that the charge is not compensable under the Act, the provider may bill the claimant.

The Medical Care Provider Specialist provides workers' compensation claims information to medical care providers. The Medical Care Provider Specialist also assists providers with disputes over non-payment and underpayment of treatment by contacting appropriate parties and facilitating resolution.

=== Services for attorneys ===
The Commission offers attorneys representing clients conducting Commission business several methods of staying current with standard practice and procedure, as well as sources of workers' compensation information. Online access is available to attorneys through WebFile, the Commission's web-based file access portal. Judicial opinions are available for searching online.

=== Services for self-insured organizations ===
Based on the information in the application, and any other information that may be requested, the Commission assesses the applicant's financial status, the nature and hazard of the employment, the number of employees, the amount of payroll, the employer's claims experience (frequency, severity, and cost), the employer's ability to manage claims, and such other factors as may affect the viability of the applicant as an individual self-insurer for workers' compensation in Virginia.

This assessment results in a determination of whether the privilege of self-insurance can be granted and what security is necessary. The security may be in the form of a bond from a licensed surety company, certificate of deposit, United States government obligations, letter of credit or cash, in the minimum amount of $750,000. Most security amounts are considerably higher than the minimum. The employer may also be required to carry excess coverage. If the applicant is a subsidiary of a larger corporation, a parental guarantee will usually be required. The Commission requires that even if self-insurance is subsequently surrendered or revoked, the security must remain in place to cover all outstanding liability for the period of self-insurance.

If approved, the applicant is issued a Certificate of Self-Insurance which remains in full force and affect until voluntarily surrendered or revoked by the Commission. The self-insurer must pay directly all benefits to which the employee is entitled under Virginia Law. The Commission also requires that the self-insurer designate a single in-state representative who can meet the requirements specified in the 1991 directive on designated representatives. Requirements regarding addresses to be used for the routine handling of claims are included in Section 4 of that same directive.

=== Services for Group Self-Insurance Associations (GSIAs) ===
Virginia employers that are required to insure their workers' compensation liability may be eligible to participate in a group self-insurance association. The Virginia Workers' Compensation Act established this program in section 65.2-802 of the Code of Virginia. The program is administered by the State Corporation Commission, Bureau of Insurance.

For those associations currently providing services under the program, the Commission provides online access to such associations to satisfy their reporting obligations. This access is available through WebFile, the Commission's web-based file access portal.

=== Services for professional employer organizations (PEOs) ===
Virginia employers required to insure their workers' compensation liability may be eligible to participate in a professional employer organization. The Virginia Workers' Compensation Act established this program in section 65.2-803.1 of the Code of Virginia. The program is administered by the Commission.

Pursuant to Section 65.2-803.1, all professional employer organizations must register with this Commission prior to transacting business in Virginia, and provide regular reports subsequent to the initial registration. PEO registration and reporting requirements are found in the Virginia Workers' Compensation Act and in the Commission's regulations.

For those professional employer organizations currently providing services under the program, the Commission provides online access to such organizations to satisfy their reporting obligations. This access is available through WebFile, the Commission's web-based file access portal.
