= Service of process in Virginia =

Service of process in Virginia encompasses the set of rules indicating how a party to a lawsuit must be given service of process in the state of Virginia, in order for the judiciary of Virginia to have jurisdiction over that party. In the Virginia General District Court, the summons is referred to as either a "warrant" or as a "notice of motion for judgment" depending on the kind of case brought. In the Virginia Circuit Court it is simply called a summons.

== Waiver of service ==
As in federal court, the plaintiff may seek a waiver of service by mailing the defendant two copies a request to waive service of process along with a form provided by the court, and a prepaid envelope for return delivery. A Virginia defendant may return the waiver within 30 days, and will then be given 60 days from the date that the request was sent to file a responsive pleading. An out-of-state defendant has 60 days to return service, and then gets 90 days to file a response. If the defendant refuses to waive service, the plaintiff then uses the regular means to waive service of process and the court may require the defendant to pay the costs of service.

== Effecting service ==
Virginia has a number of alternatives for service of process, statutorily ordered by preference. Service by one means must be attempted and shown to be unavailable before the next method is attempted.

=== Who may serve ===
If service is not waived (or a waiver is not requested) then personal service of process may be effected by any private person who is an adult, and who is neither a party to the action nor interested in the subject matter, provided such person swears out an affidavit testifying to the time and manner of service. Usually, process is served by the sheriff, who may serve anyone in his own jurisdiction, or in adjacent cities or counties.

=== Service on individuals ===
==== Personal service ====
The first form of service which must be attempted is personal (or "actual" service). There is no immunity from service for a person who is only in Virginia to appear in a civil case. Such immunity does attach if the person is only in Virginia to appear as a witness before a grand jury or in a criminal case, although a court may strip such immunity from the party if justice demands.

==== Substituted service ====
Where the party to be served is an individual, an effort must be made to serve the party in person, but if the party is not available, various alternatives become available. First, substituted service may be delivered to the usual place of abode of the party, so long as the person receiving it is:

1. a family member of the party
2. at least 16 years old
3. not a "guest or temporary sojourner" at that location, and
4. informed of the nature of the process being delivered.

==== Posted service ====
If no person is available to accept delivery of service, then it may simply be posted on the party's front door (or whichever door appears to be the main entrance). Posting the document on any other surface will be ineffective. Where service is effected by posting in this manner, the plaintiff must then also mail a copy of the process to the defendant and certify the same to the clerk of the court at least ten days in advance of the issuance of a default judgment. Because the party's last known address will be accepted by the court as their "usual place of abode", a renter who has skipped out on the rent will deemed effectively served even if the notice is posted on, and mailed to, the apartment which that person has abandoned.

==== Service under the long-arm statute ====
Where none of the above methods are effective, a plaintiff may effect service under the Virginia long-arm statute. In order to effect service in this manner, the plaintiff must make out an affidavit asserting that the defendant is not a resident of Virginia, or can not be found in Virginia with due diligence, and recites the defendant's last known address. The plaintiff sends this, along with the process itself, to the Secretary of the Commonwealth of Virginia. The Secretary will then simply mail a copy of process by registered or certified mail to that address, and files a certificate with the court indicating that this has been done. At that point, service is deemed to be complete.

=== Service on business organizations ===
Service on a Virginia corporation may be effected on any officer or director of the company, or on the company's registered agent (every company is required to name a registered agent); however, if no registered agent has been named (or the named agent can not be found at the address provided), then substituted service can be effected on the clerk of the State Corporation Commission. Similarly, service on a foreign corporation may be effected through the company's registered agent, or through the clerk of the State Corporation Commission (who will mail a copy to the corporation's registered office), or to any officer or director of the company who can be found in Virginia. A foreign corporation which has not registered to do business in Virginia may still be sued in Virginia courts if it does extensive business in the state. Service on a general partnership may be effected on any general partner, which Virginia law holds to be sufficient to give notice to both the partnership as an entity, and to all named partners.

== Curing statute ==
A party, whether an individual or a corporation, who is not properly served may move to "quash" service of process, which will result in the court treating the case as though service had not been effected. However, under Virginia law, process will be deemed sufficient so long as the person to whom it was directed actually received it within the time prescribed by law.

The curing statute does not apply to cases for divorce or annulment.

== See also ==
- Virginia Circuit Court
- Virginia General District Court
