= Law of Virginia =

The law of Virginia consists of several levels of legal rules, including constitutional, statutory, regulatory, case law, and local laws. The Code of Virginia contains the codified legislation that define the general statutory laws for the Commonwealth.

== Sources of law in Virginia ==
The Constitution of Virginia is the foremost source of state law. Legislation is enacted by the General Assembly, published in the Acts of Assembly, and codified in the Code of Virginia. State agency regulations (sometimes called administrative law) are published in the Virginia Register of Regulations and codified in the Virginia Administrative Code. Virginia's legal system is based on common law, which is interpreted by case law through the decisions of the Supreme Court, Court of Appeals, and Circuit Courts, which may be published in the Virginia Reports, Virginia Court of Appeals Reports, and Virginia Circuit Court Opinions, respectively. Counties and municipalities may also promulgate local ordinances.

=== Constitutions ===
The foremost source of state law is the Constitution of Virginia. It provides the process for enacting all state legislation, as well as defining the powers of the state government and the basic rights of the people of Virginia. The Virginia Constitution has had six major revisions, as well as many amendments. The current version of the Constitution took effect in 1971, after having been recommended by a "Commission on Constitutional Revision", then approved by the General Assembly, the Governor, and the voters of Virginia.

As with all states, the Virginia Constitution and any other state laws may be superseded by the Constitution of the United States and U.S. federal laws, to the extent those laws conflict with Virginia laws.

=== Legislation ===
Pursuant to the state constitution, the Virginia General Assembly has the power to enact legislation. A bill that has been passed by a majority in both the Virginia House and Senate is then sent to the Governor for endorsement. If the bill is either signed by the Governor or left unsigned for thirty days, it will become an official law of the commonwealth. The Governor may also send the bill back with recommended changes or veto it outright. In either of these cases, the legislation would go back to the General Assembly for further action. An attempt to override the Governor's veto requires approval by a two-thirds vote in both houses of the General Assembly.

Its session laws are published in the Acts of the General Assembly of the State of Virginia. They are in turn codified in the Code of Virginia.

=== Regulations ===
Pursuant to certain statutes, state agencies have promulgated regulations, also known as administrative law. The Virginia Register of Regulations is the official publication of state government regulations, petitions for rulemaking, emergency regulations, Governor's executive orders, state lottery regulations and director's orders, and State Corporation Commission orders and regulations. The Virginia Administrative Code is the compilation of permanent regulations that have the force of law. The Virginia Register of Regulations is published by the Virginia Code Commission.

=== Case law ===
The legal system of Virginia is based on the common law. Like all U.S. states except Louisiana, Virginia has a reception statute providing for the "reception" of English law. All statutes, regulations, and ordinances are subject to judicial review. Pursuant to common law tradition, the courts of Virginia have developed a large body of case law through the decisions of the Supreme Court, Court of Appeals, and circuit courts.

The decisions of the Supreme Court, Court of Appeals, and circuit courts are published in the Virginia Reports, Virginia Court of Appeals Reports, and Virginia Circuit Court Opinions, respectively. Most circuit court decisions are not published. The decisions of the Supreme Court and Court of Appeals are also published in the unofficial South Eastern Reporter.

Opinions are first published online as a slip opinion, a pamphlet that contains only one decision. Slip opinions are then compiled in soft-bound volumes called advance sheets, and assigned citations (volume and page number) for the official reporters. Advance sheets are then compiled and printed in the hard-bound volumes of the reporters.

=== Local ordinances ===
The Code of Virginia provides that the maximum penalty for the violation of a local ordinance is the penalty provided by general law for a class 1 misdemeanor.

== See also ==
=== Topics ===
- Capital punishment in Virginia
- Collection of judgments in Virginia
- Drug policy of Virginia
- Felony murder rule (Virginia)
- Gun laws in Virginia
- LGBT rights in Virginia
- Virginia Civil Procedure

=== Other ===
- Politics of Virginia
- Law enforcement in Virginia
- Crime in Virginia
- Law of the United States
