= Code of Virginia =

Statutory law of the U.S. state of Virginia

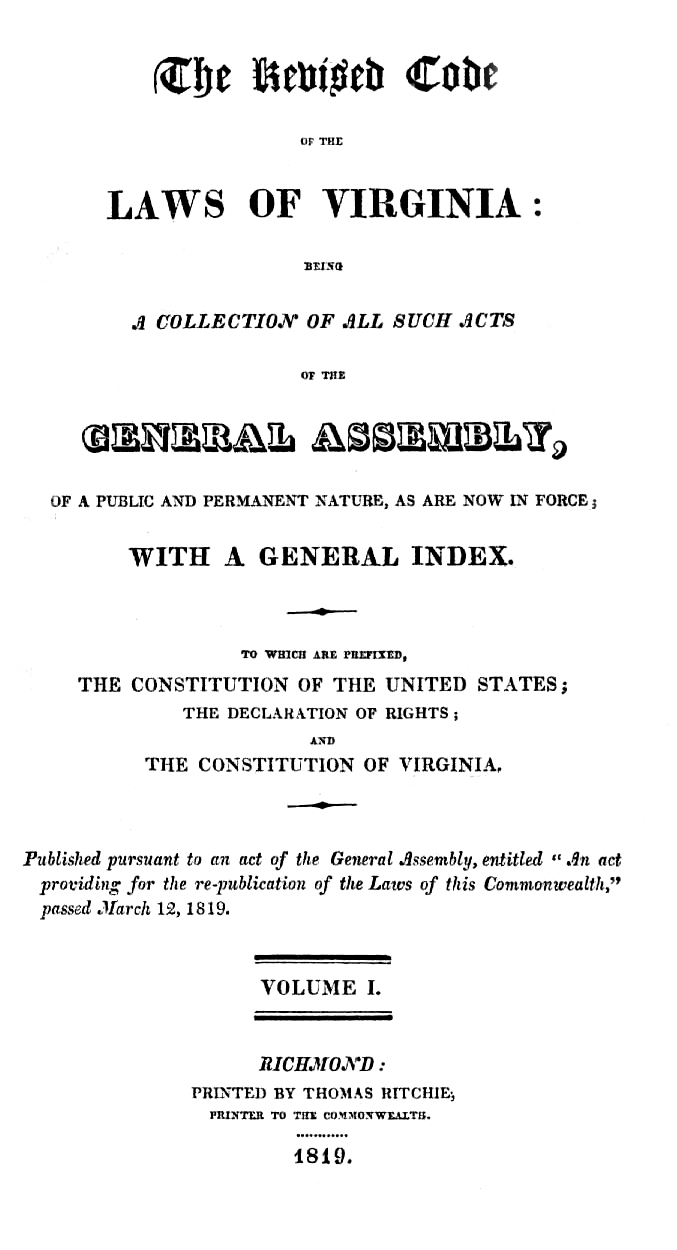
Title page to the Code of 1819, formally titled The Revised Code of the Laws of Virginia

The Code of Virginia is the statutory law of the U.S. state of Virginia and consists of the codified legislation of the Virginia General Assembly. The 1950 Code of Virginia is the revision currently in force. The previous official versions were the Codes of 1819, 1849, 1887, and 1919, though other compilations had been printed privately as early as 1733, and other editions have been issued that were not designated full revisions of the code.

== Publishing and access ==
The official version of the Code of Virginia is published by the Michie Company under contract with the Virginia Code Commission, the governmental body responsible for printing and maintaining the code. West's Annotated Code of Virginia is an unofficial, competing version issued by West Publishing, which includes more cross-references and West key numbers. The Virginia government also makes the code available without annotations for free on the internet.

As of 2026, the Code of Virginia printed by Michie's consists of thirty-four hardcover volumes, plus cumulative supplements. The statutes are fully annotated by Virginia attorneys, and include cites to and summaries of Virginia state and federal court decisions as well as law reviews. The first volume of the Code of Virginia also prints the Virginia Constitution and the Constitution of the United States.

The government of Virginia claims copyright over the Code, including the text of statutes. Individual preparers, however, may obtain rights over case annotations, indices, and various notes concerning sections and reference tables they have written.

== The Virginia Code Commission ==
Originally created in 1946 as the Commission on Code Recodification to prepare what became the Code of 1950, the Virginia Code Commission was made a permanent part of the state's legislative branch and given the responsibility for publishing and maintaining the code. It also has responsibility for publishing the Virginia Administrative Code and Rules of Evidence, as well as Virginia State Bar advisory opinions and Virginia compacts, which it may incorporate into the code. Though the Commission may arrange for the code to be published directly by and at the expense of the Commonwealth of Virginia, since 1950 it has contracted the task of printing the code out to the Michie Company.

The Commission is composed of ten members, chosen by statute from the following:

- Two present members of the Virginia Senate, by the appointment of the Senate Committee on Rules for the length of their elected term
- Two present members of the Virginia House of Delegates appointed by the Speaker of the House for the length of their elected term
- Two former or present Virginia Circuit Court judges, appointed by the governor for four-year terms
- One former member of the Senate, appointed by the Senate Committee on Rules to a four-year term
- One former member of the House of Delegates, appointed by the Speaker to a four-year term
- The Virginia Attorney General (or an assistant Attorney General by his designation)
- The Virginia Director of the Division of Legislative Services

The Commission has full discretion to publish the code with or without annotations, "to fix the number of volumes; and to decide all questions of form, makeup and arrangement, including title pages, prefaces, annotations, indices, tables of contents and reference, appendices, paper, type, binding and lettering."

It also has the independent authority to make minor changes to the code without ratification by the General Assembly. Such changes include correcting "unmistakable printer's errors," misspellings, and erroneous cross-references, and updating obsolete references to renamed code titles, governmental officers and agencies. It may also omit provisions "which, in the judgment of the Commission, are inappropriate in a code, such as emergency clauses, clauses providing for specific nonrecurring appropriations and general repealing clauses."

== Updating and revising the Code ==
The Virginia Code Commission is required to update the printed Code of Virginia at the end of each regular session of the General Assembly prior to the date new statutes and amendments become effective. "Pocket part" supplements— stapled paper updates literally stuck in a cover pocket of the hardcover volumes—are printed annually. The pocket parts were originally issued biennially, and then annually once the General Assembly began meeting every year in 1970. Volumes are also periodically recompiled and reissued, which has occurred over a hundred times; each of the original volumes of the Code of 1950 has been split at least once into separate parts.

Since 1953, the General Assembly has revised the code on a title-by-title basis rather than enacting entirely new revisions of the code as it had in the past. The Commission has the responsibility for drafting title revision and recodification bills. More than 50 titles have been repealed and replaced by successor titles, and nine of those have been replaced a second time.

For example, the General Assembly repealed Title 63.1 in 2002 and replaced it with Title 63.2. While the name (Welfare (Social Services)) remained the same, many of the chapters were modified. The Virginia Code Commission undertook the recodification of Title 63.1 in 2000 noting that such title had last been recodified in 1968 and during the intervening 34 years, "much has happened to affect laws governing social services programs and the two disability programs". The Commission rewrote and combined sections "to clarify provisions and to eliminate archaic, obsolete or redundant language" and made some substantive changes to "reflect current practices, delete eliminated programs, or conform provisions to other statutes and regulations".

The Commission must also evaluate whether any statutory provisions relating to the revised title have failed to be implemented over the previous five years due to the General Assembly failing to appropriate funds, and to recommend that such provisions be repealed. The Commission also makes annual recommendations to the General Assembly regarding which sections are obsolete and should be repealed.

== Legal supremacy of code provisions ==
The laws published in the Code of Virginia are supreme over local ordinances passed by the counties and independent cities of Virginia.

In turn, the Code's provisions must comply and be consistent with the Virginia Constitution, as well as the Constitution of the United States and federal law generally, and so its provisions are subject to invalidation by Virginia state or U.S. federal courts upon a finding that they are unconstitutional or preempted by federal legislation. Otherwise, Code provisions remain in effect until amended or repealed by the General Assembly. Changes are added through regular supplements and replacement volumes, rather than the issuance of a completely new code, which has only occurred five times.

== The Code and the Virginia Constitution ==
The Virginia Constitution, Article IV, § 12, which states that "No law shall embrace more than one object, which shall be expressed in its title", has periodically been used to attack the constitutionality of particular provisions of the Virginia Code on the basis that disparate subjects were codified under too broad or vague a topic. The Virginia Supreme Court has repeatedly rejected these arguments, ruling that § 12 does not prevent the Code from being organized around general subject matter, or require the Code to be a literal and detailed index of its contents. Instead, the purpose of this provision was to prevent the General Assembly and the public from being misled as to the nature of a law, such that "vicious legislation" was hidden by a "deceptive title."

== History ==
Though compilations of Virginia legislation were published before the Code of 1819, these were organized by their date of enactment rather than by subject matter, and so lacked the integration of modern codes. The legislation of the Colony of Virginia was not even officially published for the first 175 years of its lawmaking history. Aside from original manuscript copies that were commonly misplaced or left to rot in county courthouses, information on new legislation was largely spread by word of mouth. Aside from a few collections printed in London, the first unofficial publication of Virginia laws was in 1733, when Virginia newspaper pioneer William Parks published A collection of all the acts of Assembly of Virginia.

Official action was not taken until 1808, after Virginia became part of the United States, when the Virginia General Assembly tasked William Waller Hening with the publication of the state's laws. His thirteen volume Statutes at Large (1809–23) was not comprehensive due to the loss of many records, but included all the session laws Hening could find dating from 1619 to 1792, as well as royal charters. Many of these came from the personal collection of Thomas Jefferson, who had preserved manuscript copies of legislation as early as 1734, and had offered to take on the task of publishing himself decades prior to Hening's work.

=== The Code of 1819 ===
The Code of 1819 was the first codification in Virginia that organized the statutory law by subject matter. On March 12, 1819, the Virginia General Assembly passed "An Act Providing for the re-publication of the Laws of this Commonwealth," and the resulting Code of 1819 entered into force on January 1, 1820. The Revised Code of the Laws of Virginia: Being A Collection of all such Acts of the General Assembly, of a Public and Permanent Nature as are now in Force contained 262 chapters arranged in 23 subject titles and was published in two volumes by Thomas Ritchie, Printer to the Commonwealth.

Benjamin Watkins Leigh, member of the Virginia House of Delegates member and later reporter for the Virginia Supreme Court of Appeals, was appointed superintendent over the publication by the March 12 Act. The General Assembly, which provided him with an eight-page list of which laws to codify and expressly told him to ignore the date of enactment and categorize them instead by subject. Leigh was assisted by Hening.

Several other states had already organized their codes by subject, but conservative jurists, such as those that composed Virginia's bar, preferred the tradition of dating public acts from the year of independence. Leigh accordingly wrote an apologetic note in his preface to the Code on this issue and retained the dates in the side margin.

The Code of 1819 mistakenly included the proposed Titles of Nobility Amendment to the U.S. Constitution, which would have been the Thirteenth Amendment had it been ratified. Modern-day proponents of TONA's enactment incorrectly point to its inclusion as evidence that Virginia had ratified it, but it was merely an editorial error due to incorrect information.

=== The Code of 1849 ===
The Code of 1849 has been considered the most thorough revision of Virginia law to date. The General Assembly approved it in 1849, and it entered into force on July 1, 1850. The Code of 1849 contained 216 chapters in 56 titles, with individually numbered sections in each chapter. It also included annotations, in the form of footnotes that traced the development of institutions and legal doctrines back to the 17th century. It was nonetheless fewer than 1000 pages, something its compilers were proud of.

The Code of 1849 was principally the work of former U.S. Congressman and acting governor of Virginia, John M. Patton, and legal scholar and Virginia Supreme Court reporter Conway Robinson. They had been asked by the General Assembly in 1846 to "suggest such contradictions, omissions or imperfections, as they may perceive in the statutes" and to revise the code "in such as manner as in their opinion will render the said general statutes most concise, plain and intelligible." Patton and Robinson submitted five reports to the General Assembly between 1847 and 1849, and their work was finally adopted and passed by the General Assembly with only minor modifications.

The 1849 revision was generally accepted as a modernization of Virginia statutory law and remained in force for almost 40 years, including during the temporary secession of Virginia from the United States during the American Civil War. It also became the first statutory law of West Virginia, when it broke off from Virginia in 1863 to be admitted as a separate state.

The code was updated in 1860 and 1873, but neither edition was adopted by the General Assembly as a revision. By the 1870s, the code had expanded to more than 1,500 pages and contained numerous redundancies.

=== The Code of 1887 ===
In 1884, the General Assembly authorized a new code and appointed three revisors—two former and one future Supreme Court of Appeals judges—to correct contradictions, omissions, and other errors in the statutes "without producing a radical change in the present system." The General Assembly also required the sections of the new code to be numbered in one sequence, following the system adopted in 1873 by the Revised Statutes of the United States, which simplified citation to Virginia statutes. The revisors submitted the manuscript of their proposed code without having made any written progress reports, which the General Assembly passed without amendment with "An act to revise, arrange, and consolidate into a Code the general statutes of the Commonwealth," approved on May 16, 1887. The Code of 1887 went into effect on May 1, 1888.

The flaws of the Code of 1887 included its lack of provision for supplementation and an outdated index, and the only annotations were citations in the margins that lacked the names of the cases as well as a description of the rulings. John Garland Pollard, a private Richmond attorney who was later to serve as Virginia's attorney general and governor, corrected these errors in a series of privately published editions. His 1894 Amendments to the Code of Virginia was printed on slips of paper intended to be pasted over the amended sections. Four years later, Pollard published the Supplement to the Code of Virginia, which only printed amended sections and new laws, with new case annotations. In 1904, Pollard published the two volume Code of Virginia as Amended to Adjournment of General Assembly, which was the first printed Virginia code to be updated regularly, by biennials and supplements. It was also the first to include full case annotations that included summaries of the decisions, which more than half of those of other states had already published.

=== The Code of 1919 ===
After nearly 30 years without an official revision, the General Assembly passed an act of March 21, 1914, that empowered the governor to appoint a revision committee. The appointed revisors—a private attorney, the dean of the Washington & Lee University law school, and a retired judge—drafted a proposed code that contained laws enacted through 1916, which was passed by the General Assembly with few amendments in March 1918. The Code of 1919 went into effect on January 13, 1920.

The code contained 63 titles, with 6,571 consecutively numbered sections, and was published in an oversized, unannotated single volume and a two-volume annotated edition. Neither version of the Code of 1919 had any provision for supplementation, and so the Code of 1919 quickly became outdated, so that as soon as 1923, the director of the State Legislative Reference Bureau published General Laws of the Commonwealth of Virginia to incorporate amendments and assign section numbers to new statutes.

In 1924, the Michie Company published The Code of Virginia as Amended to Adjournment of General Assembly 1924, which was prepared by company founder and Supreme Court of Appeals reporter Thomas Johnson Michie. The Michie Code, as it became known, was supplemented after each session of the General Assembly, and a new edition was published in 1930, 1936, and 1942, by which time the one-volume code had grown to more than 3000 pages, and preparers had an increasingly difficult time squeezing new laws into the 1919 section numbering.

=== The Code of 1950 ===
In 1944, the General Assembly appointed the Virginia Advisory Legislative Council to update the Code of Virginia with a view to emulating the multivolume, annotated codes that more than thirty other states had published by that time. The Council recommended a four-volume code, with provision for pocket part supplementation. The Commission on Code Recodification was created in 1946, and its proposed code was enacted by the General Assembly on April 6, 1948, with few amendments, and published in 1949 in ten volumes by the Michie Company. The Code of 1950 became effective on February 1, 1950.

In 1953, the Virginia Code Commission recommended that the General Assembly revise the law on a title-by-title basis (which was the method followed by the U.S. Congress when it revised the United States Code) rather than a complete revision, and the General Assembly in turn gave the Code Commission the responsibility for drafting recodification bills. More than 50 titles have been repealed and replaced by successor titles, and thirteen of those have been replaced a second time. With change thus occurring step-by-step, the Code of 1950 continues to remain in force.

=== Proposed Code of 2007 ===
In 2005, the General Assembly authorized a complete revision of the Code, to become effective in 2007. Each section of the Code, like that of Georgia, would be designated by three numbers, separated by hyphens.

There was considerable outcry from practicing attorneys that they would have to relearn the designations of Code sections. In response, the General Assembly did not authorize any money in 2006 to pay for the recodification. This effectively put the recodification on hold, and it did not occur.

== Titles of the Code of Virginia ==
Note: repealed titles have been omitted

- Title 1 - General Provisions
- Title 2.2 - Administration of Government
- Title 3.2 - Agriculture, Animal Care, and Food
- Title 4.1 - Alcoholic Beverage Control Act
- Title 5.1 - Aviation
- Title 6.2 - Financial Institutions and Services
- Title 8.01 - Civil Remedies and Procedure
- Title 8.1A - Uniform Commercial Code - General Provisions
- Title 8.2 - Commercial Code - Sales
- Title 8.2A - Commercial Code - Leases
- Title 8.3A - Commercial Code - Negotiable Instruments
- Title 8.4 - Commercial Code - Bank Deposits and Collections
- Title 8.4A - Commercial Code - Funds Transfers
- Title 8.5A - Uniform Commercial Code - Letters of Credit
- Title 8.7 - Commercial Code - Warehouse Receipts, Bills of Lading and Other Documents of Title
- Title 8.8A - Commercial Code - Investment Securities
- Title 8.9A - Commercial Code - Secured Transactions
- Title 8.10 - Commercial Code - Effective Date - Transitional Provisions
- Title 8.11 - 1973 Amendatory Act - Effective Date and Transition Provisions
- Title 9.1 - Commonwealth Public Safety
- Title 10.1 - Conservation
- Title 11 - Contracts
- Title 12.1 - State Corporation Commission
- Title 13.1 - Corporations
- Title 15.2 - Counties, Cities and Towns
- Title 16.1 - Courts Not of Record
- Title 17.1 - Courts of Record
- Title 18.2 - Crimes and Offenses Generally
- Title 19.2 - Criminal Procedure
- Title 20 - Domestic Relations
- Title 21 - Drainage, Soil Conservation, Sanitation and Public Facilities Districts
- Title 22.1 - Education
- Title 23 - Educational Institutions
- Title 24.2 - Elections
- Title 25.1 - Eminent Domain
- Title 27 - Fire Protection
- Title 28.2 - Fisheries and Habitat of the Tidal Waters
- Title 29.1 - Game, Inland Fisheries and Boating
- Title 30 - General Assembly
- Title 32.1 - Health
- Title 33.2 - Highways and Other Surface Transportation Systems
- Title 34 - Homestead and Other Exemptions
- Title 35.1 - Hotels, Restaurants, Summer Camps, and Campgrounds
- Title 36 - Housing
- Title 37.2 - Behavioral Health and Developmental Services
- Title 38.2 - Insurance
- Title 40.1 - Labor and Employment
- Title 41.1 - Land Office
- Title 42.1 - Libraries
- Title 43 - Mechanics' and Certain Other Liens
- Title 44 - Military and Emergency Laws
- Title 45.1 - Mines and Mining
- Title 46.2 - Motor Vehicles
- Title 47.1 - Notaries and Out-of-State Commissioners
- Title 48 - Nuisances
- Title 49 - Oaths, Affirmations and Bonds
- Title 50 - Partnerships
- Title 51.1 - Pensions, Benefits, and Retirement
- Title 51.5 - Persons with Disabilities
- Title 52 - Police (State)
- Title 53.1 - Prisons and Other Methods of Correction
- Title 54.1 - Professions and Occupations
- Title 55 - Property and Conveyances
- Title 56 - Public Service Companies
- Title 57 - Religious and Charitable Matters; Cemeteries
- Title 58.1 - Taxation
- Title 59.1 - Trade and Commerce
- Title 60.2 - Unemployment Compensation
- Title 61.1 - Warehouses, Cold Storage and Refrigerated Locker Plants
- Title 62.1 - Waters of the State, Ports and Harbors
- Title 63.2 - Welfare (Social Services)
- Title 64.2 - Wills, Trusts, and Fiduciaries
- Title 65.2 - Workers' Compensation
- Title 66 - Juvenile Justice
- Title 67 - Virginia Energy Plan

== See also ==
- Law of Virginia
- United States Code
