= Constitution of Virginia =

American state constitution

Constitution of the Commonwealth of Virginia
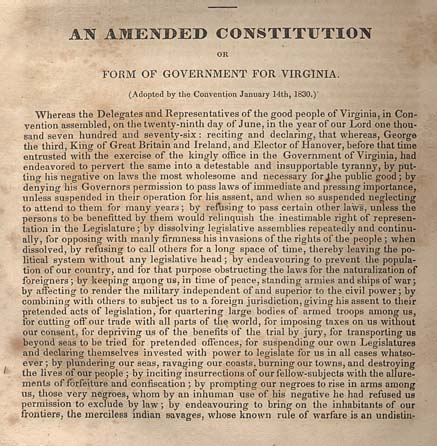
- Page one of the updated constitution following the Virginia Constitutional Convention of 1829-1830

Overview
- Jurisdiction: Virginia
- Subordinate to: Supreme law of the United States
- Date effective: June 29, 1776

Government structure
- Branches: 3
- Chambers: Bicameral
- Executive: Governor of Virginia
- Judiciary: Judiciary of Virginia
- Commissioned by: Fifth Virginia Convention
- Authors: George Mason; James Madison
- Supersedes: Virginia Colonial Government

Full text
- Constitution of Virginia at Wikisource

The Constitution of the Commonwealth of Virginia is the document that defines and limits the powers of the state government and the basic rights of the citizens of the Commonwealth of Virginia. Like all other state constitutions, it is supreme over Virginia's laws and acts of government, though it may be superseded by the United States Constitution and U.S. federal law as per the Supremacy Clause.

The original Virginia Constitution of 1776 was enacted at the time of the Declaration of Independence by the first thirteen states of the United States of America. Virginia was an early state to adopt its own Constitution on June 29, 1776, and the document was widely influential both in the United States and abroad. In addition to frequent amendments, there have been six major subsequent revisions of the constitution (by Conventions for the constitutions of 1830, 1851, 1864, 1870, 1902, and by commission for 1971 amendments). These new constitutions have been part of, and in reaction to, periods of major regional or social upheaval in Virginia. For instance, the 1902 constitution included provisions to disenfranchise African Americans, who in 1900 made up nearly 36% of the state's population. They did not regain suffrage until after the enactment of federal civil rights legislation in the mid-1960s.

== Historic constitutions ==
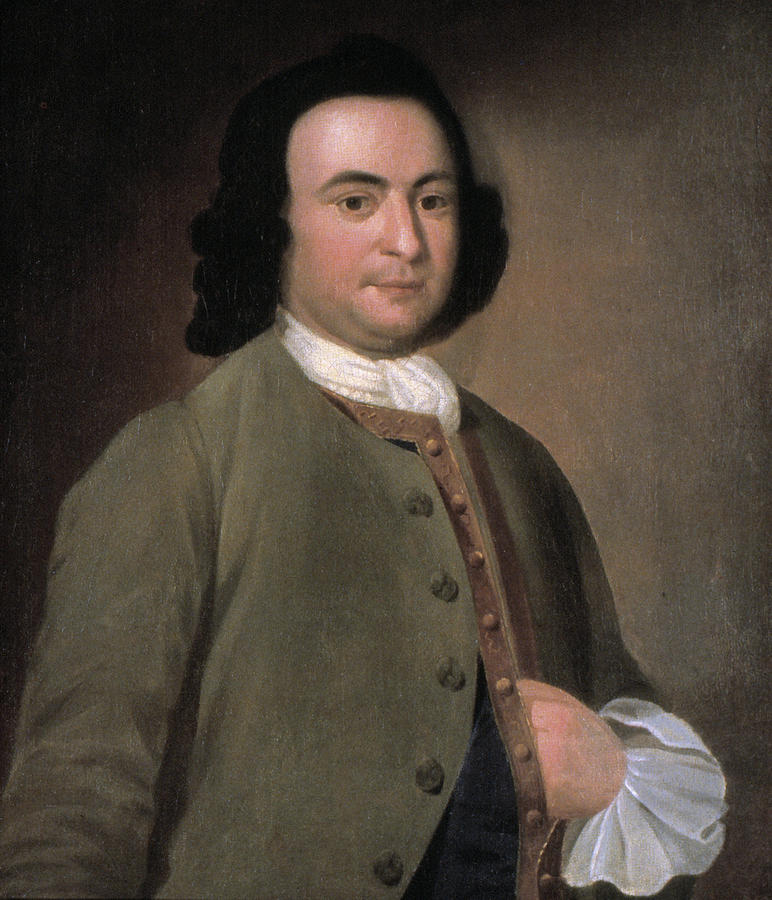
George Mason, one of the principal architects of the 1776 Virginia Constitution

=== 1776 ===
The drafting of the first Virginia Constitution began in early 1776, amidst the American colonies' break with Britain. George Mason and James Madison played central roles in shaping the document. Although Thomas Jefferson submitted a draft from the Second Continental Congress in Philadelphia, it arrived too late to be considered. Madison's involvement in Virginia’s founding charter would later inform his work on the United States Constitution. Jefferson later criticized the final version, arguing it lacked sufficient structural checks and failed to secure a truly balanced republican government.

Adopted on June 29, 1776, the Constitution formally dissolved Virginia’s allegiance to the British crown and accused King George III of tyranny. It created a bicameral legislature—the General Assembly—and established a weak executive branch, with a governor elected annually by the legislature. The accompanying Virginia Declaration of Rights, drafted by Mason, outlined core political principles, including the inherent rights of individuals and the fundamental purpose of government. Its language deeply influenced the U.S. Declaration of Independence and later served as a model for the U.S. Bill of Rights.

While revolutionary in tone, the 1776 Constitution preserved many aspects of colonial governance. Drawing on Enlightenment philosophy—especially John Locke's theories of natural rights—the framers emphasized legislative supremacy and separation of powers, though in practice most authority remained in the General Assembly. Both the executive and judiciary were appointed by the legislature, creating little institutional independence. Historian Brent Tarter argues this structure "entrenched the power of the landed gentry" and ensured continued dominance by Virginia’s elite families. Representation was based on fixed counties rather than population, disproportionately empowering eastern slaveholding regions over growing western settlements.

Suffrage was limited to white male property owners, excluding most Virginians from political participation. Historian Leonard Levy notes that this restriction reflected elite fears of popular democracy and protected the political order from what they saw as “mob rule.” Although the Declaration of Rights advocated religious freedom, the Anglican Church remained Virginia’s established religion, and the Constitution offered little protection to dissenters. It was also silent on slavery, leaving the institution legally untouched—an omission that, according to Tarter, signaled tacit approval.

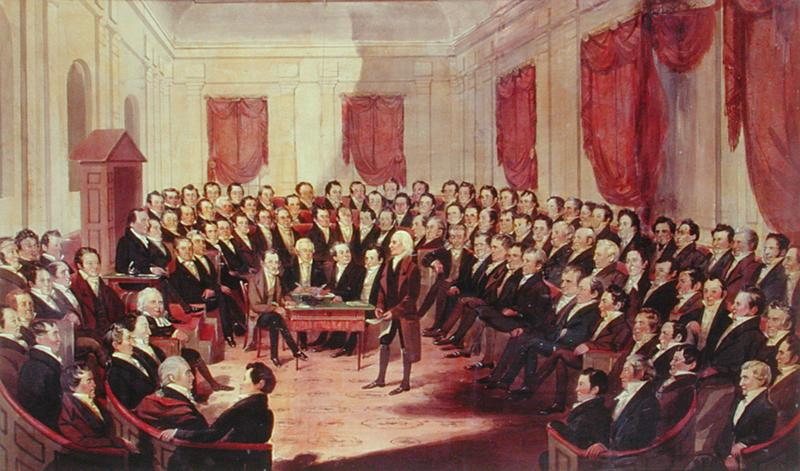
The Virginia Constitutional Convention, 1830, by George Catlin

Despite these limitations, the Constitution of 1776 significantly influenced other revolutionary governments. Gordon S. Wood describes it as a blueprint for state-building, particularly in its emphasis on written rights declarations and legislative dominance, although later generations would criticize the imbalance of power it created. Legal scholar Stephen McCullough observes that courts have since interpreted the document as coextensive with federal constitutional protections, often neglecting the unique rights and traditions rooted in Virginia's own legal history. He argues that “preserving the vitality of the Virginia Constitution depends on active interpretation,” and calls for greater scholarly and judicial engagement with its original meaning.

=== 1830 ===
By the 1820s, Virginia was one of only two states that limited voting to landowners. In addition, because representation was by county rather than population, the residents of increasingly populous Western Virginia (the area that would become West Virginia in 1863) had grown discontented at their limited representation in the legislature. Pressure increased until a constitutional convention was convened in 1829–1830. This convention became largely a contest between eastern Virginia planters of the slaveholding elite and the less affluent yeomen farmers of Western Virginia. Issues of representation and suffrage dominated the debate. Delegates to the convention included such prominent Virginians as James Madison, James Monroe, John Tyler, and John Marshall. Western leaders included Philip Doddridge and Alexander Campbell.

The convention ultimately compromised by loosening suffrage requirements. It also reduced the number of senators and delegates to the Virginia General Assembly. The resulting constitution was ratified by a popular majority, though most of the voters in the western part of the state ended up voting against it. Thus, the underlying intrastate tensions remained, and would have to be addressed later.

=== 1851 ===
As of the 1840 census, the majority of the white residents of the state lived in western Virginia, but they were underrepresented in the legislature because of the continued property requirement for voting; not all held sufficient property to vote. This compounded their dissatisfaction with the apportionment scheme adopted in 1830, which was based on counties rather than population, thus giving disproportionate power to the fewer, but propertied whites who lived in the eastern part of the state and kept a grip on the legislature. As the state legislature also elected the governor and the United States senators, Western Virginians felt they had little influence on state leadership. Their attempts to win electoral reform in the Virginia legislature were defeated each time. Some began to openly discuss the abolition of slavery or secession from the state. Ultimately, the eastern planters could not continue to ignore their discontent, and a new constitutional convention was called to resolve the continuing tensions.

The most significant change adopted in the 1851 Constitution was elimination of the property requirement for voting, resulting in extension of the suffrage to all white males of voting age. The 1851 Constitution established popular election for the governor, the newly created office of lieutenant governor, and all Virginia judges, rather than the election of the top two state officers by the legislature, or political appointment for judges. Because of these changes, the 1851 Virginia Constitution became known as the "Reform Constitution".

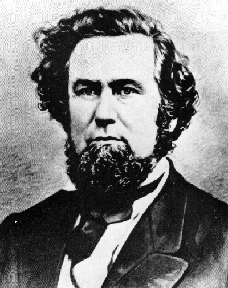
Portrait of Francis H. Pierpont, governor and driving force behind the 1864 Constitution

=== 1864 ===
When in 1861, the Virginia legislature voted for secession in the events leading up to the American Civil War, all of the western and several of the northern counties dissented. They set up a separate government with Francis H. Pierpont as governor. During the Civil War, this separate or "restored" government approved the creation of West Virginia as a separate state (which was admitted to the Union in 1863) and in 1864 it approved a new Constitution. The constitution was the product of a divided state and government; it was the first since the original 1776 Constitution to be adopted by the legislature without a popular vote.

The 1864 Constitution abolished slavery in Virginia, disenfranchised men who had served in the Confederate government, recognized the creation of the State of West Virginia, and adjusted the number and terms of office of the members of the Virginia Assembly.

The foreword to the current Virginia Constitution does not include the 1864 Constitution in its list of previous constitutions. It notes that the 1864 Constitution was drafted under wartime conditions and was of uncertain legal status.

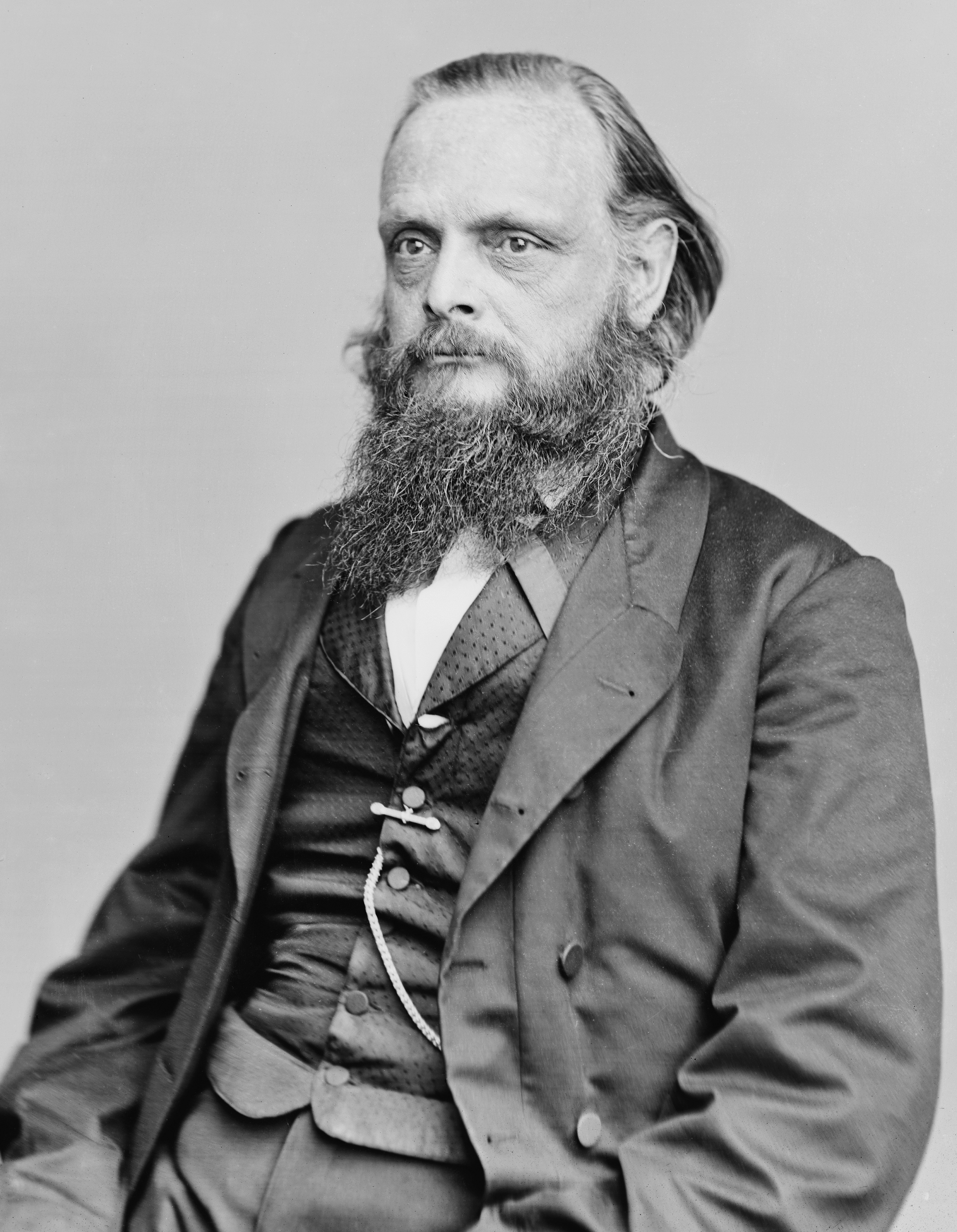
John C. Underwood. He so dominated the 1867–1868 constitutional convention that the resulting document became known as the "Underwood Constitution".

=== 1870 ===
After the end of the Civil War, Virginia came briefly under military rule during Reconstruction, with the district commanded by John M. Schofield. Pursuant to federal Reconstruction legislation, Schofield called for a new constitutional convention to meet in Richmond from December 1867 to April 1868. In protest of freedmen's suffrage, many of Virginia's conservative whites refused to participate in voting for delegates. As a result, Republicans led by Judge John Curtiss Underwood dominated the convention. Opponents called the result the "Underwood Constitution" or the "Negro Constitution", as it gave freedmen suffrage.

Significant provisions included expanding the suffrage to all male citizens over the age of 21, which included freedmen; establishing a state public school system for the first time, with mandatory funding and attendance; and providing for judges to be elected by the General Assembly rather than by popular vote. Controversy over clauses that continued the temporary disenfranchisement of former Confederate government members delayed the adoption of the Constitution. An eventual compromise provided for separate voting disenfranchisement clauses and the rest of the Constitution; the former failed to win approval. The remainder of the Underwood Constitution was ratified by a popular vote of 210,585 to 9,136 and went into effect in 1870.

=== 1902 ===
In the late nineteenth century, white Democrats regained power in state legislatures across the South. They passed Jim Crow laws establishing racial segregation in public facilities and restricting the lives of blacks. Beginning with Mississippi in 1890, legislatures began to ratify new constitutions, amendments or electoral laws that disenfranchised African American voters, devising means such as poll taxes, literacy tests and residential requirements that passed Supreme Court review but worked against poor blacks and many poor whites. By the turn of the 20th century, six Southern states had essentially eliminated the black vote, and pressure mounted among whites in Virginia to do the same, ostensibly as a way to stop electoral fraud and corruption.

The 1901 constitutional convention met in this climate. Members were focused on restricting black voting rights without violating the Fifteenth Amendment to the United States Constitution or disenfranchising poor whites. Led by the future Senator Carter Glass, the convention created requirements that all prospective voters had to pay poll taxes or pass a literacy test administered by white registrars. An exemption was granted, in a kind of grandfather clause, for military veterans and sons of veterans, who were virtually all white. The changes effectively disenfranchised black voters, though many illiterate whites were also unable to meet the new requirements. In 1900 blacks made up nearly 36 percent of the population. In succeeding elections, the Virginia electorate was reduced by nearly half as a result of the changes. When adjusted for the Nineteenth Amendment, voter turnout would not return to 1900 levels until 1952 within a statewide population almost twice the size. The small electorate was key to maintaining the dominant Democratic Organization in power for sixty years.

Other significant provisions of the 1902 Constitution imposed racial segregation in public schools (which already existed on a de facto basis) and abolished the county court system. The Constitution provided for the creation of the State Corporation Commission to regulate the growing power of the railroads. Because of concern over African American opposition, the convention did not honor its pledge to have the proposed constitution put to popular vote. Like the 1864 Constitution by the Loyalist government during the Civil War, the legislature adopted the 1902 Constitution without ratification by the electorate. It was in effect far longer than any previous Virginia constitution.

== Current constitution (1971) ==
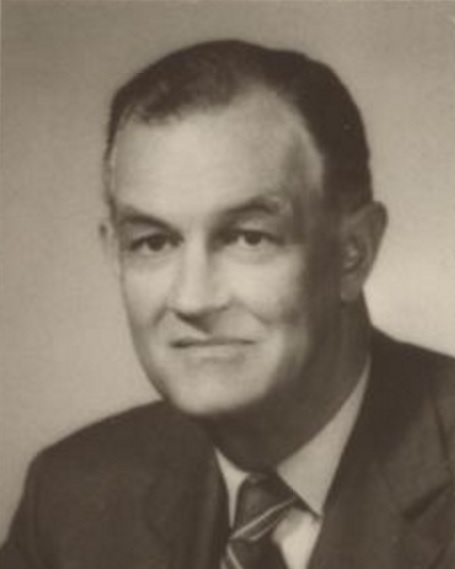
Mills Godwin (1974)

As a result of the Civil Rights Movement's challenging the restrictions and discrimination practiced against blacks' exercise of constitutional rights, a series of US Supreme Court cases, beginning with Brown v. Board of Education in 1954, the 24th Amendment, and federal legislation: the Civil Rights Act of 1964 and the Voting Rights Act of 1965 had overturned the most controversial aspects of the 1902 Constitution – the provisions restricting voting by African Americans and mandating school segregation. Combined with the election of Governor Mills Godwin in 1965, there was impetus for governmental change. Godwin strongly advocated the loosening of the strict constitutional restrictions on state-issued bonds and borrowing and used his power and popularity to push for a new constitution. In 1968 a joint resolution of the Virginia General Assembly approved a new commission, chaired by former Governor Albertis Harrison, to revise the constitution.

The Commission on Constitutional Revision presented its report and recommendations to Governor Godwin and the General Assembly in January 1969, and continued to work with them to draft a final consensus version. The proposed Constitution was overwhelmingly approved by the voters of Virginia (who by then included African American men and women, following passage of federal civil rights legislation in the mid-1960s) and took effect on July 1, 1971.

Since 1971, additional amendments have been passed by the General Assembly and approved by the voters to conform to provisions in the U.S. Constitution, rulings from the U.S. Supreme Court and Congressional statute. The voting age has been reduced to eighteen, voting residency requirements have been removed, and voter registration conforms to the Motor Voter Act. Additionally, the Virginia Constitution now provides for a General Assembly session following a governor's veto, and the right of the people to hunt, fish and harvest game is guaranteed. In 2006, Virginians passed an amendment limiting marriage to "unions between one man and one woman". That has since been overturned by Obergefell v. Hodges (2015), which legalized same-sex marriage throughout the United States.

The current Constitution of Virginia consists of twelve Articles:

=== Article I – Bill of Rights ===
Article I contains the entire original Virginia Declaration of Rights from the 1776 Constitution. Several of the sections have been expanded to incorporate concepts from the United States Bill of Rights, including the right to due process, the prohibition against double jeopardy, and the right to bear arms. Like the Federal Constitution, the Virginia Bill of Rights, in §17, states that the listing of certain rights is not to be construed to exclude other rights held by the people.

In 1997, a Victims' Rights Amendment was added to the Virginia Bill of Rights as §8-A. In Nobrega v. Commonwealth, the only case so far to interpret this amendment, the Virginia Supreme Court used the Victims's Rights Amendment to support its ruling that an alleged rape victim could not be compelled to submit to a psychiatric evaluation.

On November 7, 2006, Virginia voters ratified an amendment, previously approved by the General Assembly, prohibiting same-sex marriage, to be added to the Bill of Rights. This amendment also prohibits the recognition of any "union, partnership, or other legal status" between unmarried people that intends to approximate marriage or which confers the "rights, benefits, obligations, qualities, or effects of marriage." The Virginia Attorney General issued an opinion stating that the amendment does not change the legal status of documents such as contracts, wills, or advance medical directives between unmarried people. The amendment was declared to be in violation the United States Constitution by a U.S. District Court Judge on February 13, 2014. (In 2015, the U.S. Supreme Court ruled in Obergefell v. Hodges that the failure to provide for same-sex marriage by any U.S. state had the effect of violating the rights of homosexuals to equal protection of law required under the Fourteenth Amendment to the United States Constitution.)

=== Article II – Franchise and Officers ===
The second Article of the Constitution sets out the procedures and mechanisms for voting, elections and holding office. Pursuant to Section 1, any Virginia resident over age 18 may vote in state elections; the voting age was reduced from 21 by a 1972 amendment to the federal constitution. However, § 1 denies the vote to people who have been determined to be mentally incompetent or anyone convicted of a felony. Disfranchising convicted felons has been found to be consistent with the Equal Protection Clause of the U.S. Constitution. The General Assembly, pursuant to §4, is given wide power to regulate the time, place, and manner of all elections.

§5 establishes that the only qualifications to hold office in Virginia are that a person must have been a Virginia resident for at least one year and eligible to vote. Any statute or rule requiring other qualifications is constitutionally invalid under this section. But, the General Assembly can impose local residency requirements for election to local governmental bodies or for election to the Assembly in representation of particular districts.

=== Article III – Division of Powers ===
Article III has one section, confirming the principle of separation of powers between the legislative, executive and judicial branches of government. Unlike the U.S. federal Constitution, the Virginia Constitution explicitly provides that no branch may exercise powers that properly belong to the others. Separation between the branches of government is also listed as a right of the people in §5 of Article I.

=== Article IV – Legislature ===
Article IV establishes the basic structure and authority of the Virginia legislature. The legislative power of the state is vested in the Virginia General Assembly, which consists of the Virginia Senate and the Virginia House of Delegates. §17 of Article IV gives the legislature the power to impeach members of the executive and judicial branches.

The original §14 of Article IV forbade the incorporation of churches, though the Virginia Commission on Constitutional Revision, in its 1969 report, had recognized that the prohibition was probably invalid. The federal district court for the Western District of Virginia ruled in April 2002 that this provision of the Virginia Constitution was in fact unconstitutional, because it violates the federal constitutional right to the free exercise of religion. The court found that it is unconstitutional to deny a church the option to incorporate under state law when other groups can incorporate. The Virginia Constitution was subsequently amended to remove the restriction.

=== Article V – Executive ===
The fifth Article similarly defines the structure and powers of the executive branch. The Governor of Virginia is invested as the chief executive, though §1 of Article V, provides that the governor may not run for successive terms. The offices of lieutenant governor and attorney general are established as supporting elected constitutional positions.

The constitutional powers of the governor include the ability to sign legislation, veto bills (which veto may then be overridden by a two-thirds majority of both houses of the assembly), and issue pardons.

=== Article VI – Judiciary ===
Article VI vests judicial power in the Supreme Court of Virginia, along with the subordinate courts created by the General Assembly. Judges are appointed by a majority vote in the General Assembly to terms of 12 years for Supreme Court Justices and 8 years for other judges. The Supreme Court, pursuant to §5, has the authority to make rules governing the practice of law and procedures in the courts of the commonwealth (see rules), and the Chief Justice of the Supreme Court is established as the administrative head of the Virginia judicial system.

=== Article VII – Local Government ===
Article VII of the Constitution sets up the basic framework for the structure and function of local government in Virginia. Local government may be established at the town (population over 1000), city (population over 5000), county or regional government level. Article VII gives the General Assembly the power to create general laws for the organization and governing of these political subdivisions, except that regional governments cannot be created without the consent of the majority of the voters who vote on the issue in the region.

Section 4 establishes the constitutional offices of treasurer, sheriff, Commonwealth's Attorney, clerk of court and Commissioner of the Revenue to be elected within each city and county in Virginia.

=== Article VIII – Education ===
A compulsory and free primary and secondary public education for every Virginia child is the focus of Article VIII. The General Assembly is empowered to determine the funding for the educational system and apportion the cost between state and local government. A state Board of Education is established to create school divisions and effectuate the overall educational policies. Supervision of the individual schools is delegated to local school boards, provided for in §7.

=== Article IX – Corporations ===
The primary purpose of Article IX is to create the Virginia State Corporation Commission, which is charged with administering the laws that regulate corporations. The State Corporation Commission also issues charters for Virginia corporations and licenses to do business for "foreign" (non-Virginia) corporations. Section 5 of Article IX prohibits such foreign corporations from doing anything in Virginia that a Virginia corporation could not do.

=== Article X – Taxation and Finance ===
Article X establishes the basic structure for taxation of personal property in Virginia. Pursuant to this Article, all non-exempt real and personal property is subject to taxation at its fair market value. Section 6 sets out a lengthy list of exempt property, which includes church property, cemeteries, and non-profit school property.

Significant additions to Article X include §7, a budget amendment, which became effective in 1986, and §7-A, which establishes the "Lottery Proceeds Fund", requiring that all proceeds from the lottery be set aside for educational purposes.

=== Article XI – Conservation ===
Article XI states that it is the general policy of the Commonwealth to preserve, protect and conserve the state's natural and historic resources. The General Assembly is permitted to further these policies by entering into public-private partnerships or partnerships with federal agencies.

A 2001 amendment added §4, which establishes hunting and fishing as constitutional rights of Virginians, though the legislature may enact appropriate regulations and restrictions on these rights.

=== Article XII – Future changes ===
The last Article creates the mechanism for future changes to the Constitution. Any amendment to the Constitution must first be passed by a majority in each of the two legislative houses. The proposed amendment must then be held over for consideration by the succeeding elected legislature, where it must again be passed by a majority in each house. The amendment then goes on the general ballot and becomes enacted into the Constitution if approved by a majority of the voters.

Alternatively, a two-thirds vote of both Virginia houses may call for the creation of a constitutional convention. Any revisions or amendments proposed by the constitutional convention are presented to the citizens of Virginia and become law upon approval by a majority of voters.

There is a perennial discussion over Virginia's unique Constitutional status restricting its governor to one consecutive term, and its method of selecting both trial and appellate judges by state legislature, shared only with South Carolina.

Since the current constitution was ratified, there have been 53 amendments added to the constitution, concerning issues ranging from tax exemptions and voting rules to budgeting and legislative calendars. In 2020, the state redistricting process was dramatically reshaped, establishing a bipartisan redistricting commission with judicial oversight.

== See also ==
- Law of Virginia
- Virginia Conventions
