= Trial de novo =

"New trial" in law

In law, the term "trial de novo" means a "new trial" by a different tribunal (de novo is a Latin expression meaning "afresh", "anew", "beginning again", hence the literal meaning "new trial"). A trial de novo is usually ordered by an appellate court when the original trial failed to decide in a manner dictated by law.

== Common law ==
In common law systems, one feature that distinguishes a trial de novo from an appellate proceeding is that new evidence may not ordinarily be presented in an appeal (though there are rare instances when it may be allowed—usually evidence that came to light only after the trial and could not, in all diligence, have been presented in the lower court). The general rule is that an appeal must be based solely on "points of law" and not on "points of fact". Appeals are frequently based on a claim that the trial judge or jury did not allow or appreciate all the facts; if that claim is successful, the appeal judges will often order a trial "de novo". To protect the individual's rights against double jeopardy, ordering a trial "de novo" is often the exclusive right of an appeal judge.

For example, a system may relegate a claim of a certain amount to a judge but preserve the right to a new trial before a jury.

In American federal courts, "de novo" can also refer to a standard of review for courts of appeal. Sometimes, particularly potent issues are brought before an appeals court, such as a constitutional determination made by a lower court, or summary judgment granted by a lower court. When this sort of issue is on appeal, the court of appeals will review the lower court decision "de novo" or from the beginning. In this process, the panel of judges for the court of appeals will review the lower court's reasoning and fact-finding from the beginning, based on the record. This is a high level of scrutiny that is more likely to result in reversal or remand of an issue.

This is in contrast to more relaxed standards of review, such as "clearly erroneous" or "substantial evidence." These relaxed standards usually do not result in reversals, as the court of appeals grants more deference to the judgment of the lower courts.

=== United Kingdom ===
In the law of England and Wales, appeals to the Crown Court against convictions in a magistrates' court are held de novo.

=== United States ===
In the United States, some states provide for bench trials only for small claims, traffic offenses, and criminal offenses with a penalty of imprisonment of less than six months, then provide the ability to appeal a loss to the trial court of general jurisdiction for a brand-new trial. Unlike the appellate court which only examines the issues raised in the original trial, in a trial de novo a brand new trial takes place. The Supreme Court of Virginia said this in Santen v. Tuthill, 265 Va. 492 (2003), about the practice of an appeal from district court trial de novo to circuit court: "This Court has repeatedly held that the effect of an appeal to circuit court is to 'annul the judgment of the inferior tribunal as completely as if there had been no previous trial.'" Some states use a system combining aspects of traditional appeal and absolute trial de novo; for instance, in New Jersey, decisions in minor criminal and traffic cases heard in the state's municipal courts may be appealed to the Law Division, Criminal Part of the Superior Court for "trial de novo on the record," in which the Law Division makes new findings of fact and conclusions of law based on the record produced in the municipal court's trial (i.e. based on the transcript of the municipal court proceeding and any physical or documentary evidence presented to the Municipal Court), but does not hold any evidentiary hearings itself.

De novo review refers to the appellate court's authority to review the trial court's conclusions on questions of the application, interpretation, and construction of law. Generally, the proper standard of review for employee benefit decisions, such as the denial of benefit claims, is de novo. Also, where the appellate court undertakes judicial review of compulsory arbitration proceedings that were required by statute, the reviewing court must conduct a de novo review of the interpretation and application of the law by the arbitrators.Wright, Charles Alan; Miller, Arthur R. (2024). Federal Practice and Procedure. Vol. 16AA (5th ed.). Thomson Reuters. pp. 332–334. "Under de novo review, the appellate court gives no deference to the trial court's conclusions of law. The reviewing court independently determines questions of law, including the interpretation and application of statutes or contract terms."

De novo review often used in the review of administrative proceedings or the judgements of a small claims court. If the determination made by a lower body is overturned, it may be renewed de novo in the review process (this is usually before it reaches the court system). Sometimes administrative decisions may be reviewed by the courts on a de novo basis.

== See also ==
- New trial
- Appeal
