= Virginia General District Court =

The Virginia General District Court (GDC) is the lowest level of the Virginia court system, and is the court that most Virginians have contact with. The jurisdiction of the GDC is generally limited to traffic cases and other misdemeanors, civil cases involving amounts of under $25,000. There are 32 GDC districts, each having at least one judge, and each having a clerk of the court and a courthouse with courtroom facilities.

The GDCs are not courts of record, meaning that they do not keep detailed records of their proceedings and their decisions provide no precedent to be cited in other proceedings. Proceedings before the GDC are less formal than those brought before higher courts in the state. They do not conduct jury trials; cases are heard and decided by the judge. In civil cases, they are only empowered to award legal damages, and generally cannot provide remedies in equity, such as injunctions or declaratory judgments.

== Jurisdiction and venue ==
=== Subject-matter jurisdiction ===
The subject-matter jurisdiction of the GDC is narrow, both with respect to civil cases and criminal cases. With respect to civil claims, it has sole authority to try cases involving amounts of $4,500 or less. It shares authority with the Virginia Circuit Court to try cases involving sums between $4,500 and $50,000. The amount in controversy is determined without considering interest or attorney's fees, even if recovery of these costs is specified in the contract. Within these limitations, the GDC can hear cases in tort or contract, and actions in detinue seeking the return of wrongfully held personal property. In determining whether the amount involved falls within the amount in controversy requirement, interest payments and attorney's fees contracted for in a written instrument.

In cases involving unlawful detainer of real estate used for business, commercial, or agricultural purposes, the GDC may hear cases involving claims of rent owed and property damage without limitation. If the real estate is used for residential purposes, then the $25,000 limit applies. The maximum jurisdictional limits do not apply to any claim, counter-claim or cross-claim in an unlawful detainer action that includes a claim for damages or rent against any person obligated on a residential lease. The GDC may issue distress warrants establishing the rights of a creditor to seize property, again without limit as to the amount. Conversely, the GDC may order the attachment of personal property valued up to $25,000, but has no authority to order the attachment of real estate, no matter how low the value. With respect to criminal cases, the GDC may only try misdemeanors. In 2025, Virginia's general district courts resolved about 1.0 million criminal and traffic cases; about 42 percent of resolved cases did not result in a conviction, most often through judicial dismissal (about 30 percent) rather than nolle prosequi (about 10 percent).. The GDC also has no authority over domestic relations matters such as divorce, annulment, and child custody, nor does it have authority over the probate of wills, which are directed to the exclusive jurisdiction of the Circuit Courts. The only injunctive relief that the GDC may grant is in enforcing the state's Freedom of Information Act.

=== Personal jurisdiction ===
The GDC must also be able to exercise personal jurisdiction over the defendant, which may be premised on the defendant's physical presence in the jurisdiction, or on the occurrence of some element of the cause of action in the jurisdiction. Personal jurisdiction is predicated on Virginia's long-arm statute, which generally permits Virginia courts to exercise personal jurisdiction over a party that resides in Virginia, or transacts substantial business in Virginia, or who caused an actionable injury in Virginia. A party may waive a lack of personal jurisdiction, but may also appear in court to contest personal jurisdiction without thereby waiving the issue.

=== Venue ===
In terms of venue, where personal jurisdiction lies in multiple districts, the appropriate venue for the case to be heard is set forth by Virginia statutes, which divides possible venues as "Category A" (preferred) and "Category B" (permissible), and requires that Category B venue may only be used where no Category A venue is available. For example, in a dispute over the ownership of land, Category A venue lies where the land is located. Most Category A venue provisions of the Virginia statutes are inapplicable to the GDC, which does not have subject matter jurisdiction over divorce and probate matters, and can not issue injunctions. In the types of cases that can be heard in the GDC, venue is generally deemed objectionable if it is not where the defendant resides or has a registered office or registered agent, or where some part of the action arose.

== Civil procedure ==
=== Initiating litigation ===
GDC proceedings are relatively informal. It is not necessary to file formal pleadings. Rather, a plaintiff can fill out and serve the defendant with a "civil warrant", which is a form provided by the Clerk of the Court containing blanks to be filled in identifying the parties and the cause of action. Alternatively, the plaintiff can draft his own "notice of motion for judgment". The notice provided to the defendant must instruct the defendant of several things. It must explain how the trial date will be set; it must inform the defendant that failure to appear and contest the claim can result in a default being entered; and, under something of a quirk of Virginia law, it must tell the defendant how they may object to venue. The defendant need not file an answer at all, but can simply show up in court on the designated "return date" and contest the claim. The civil warrant may be served on the defendant by the sheriff or deputy of the county in which the defendant resides, unless the plaintiff opts to have service of process effected by an officer of the court. The return date is the date on which the defendant must appear in court, and can be anywhere from 5 to 60 days after service of process is effected.

If the defendant feels that the plaintiff has not provided enough information about the cause of action, he may file a motion for a "bill of particulars", and if the court grants such a motion then the plaintiff will be ordered to provide the requested details. If the cause of action is premised on a written instrument such as a contract or a deed, the original document must be provided to the court, and the defendant may use a motion for a bill of particulars to compel the production of this document as well. The plaintiff, on the other hand, may file a motion for "grounds of defense", which, if granted, will result in an order requiring the defendant to submit a written response indicating the defenses that it intends to assert. If the plaintiff fails to respond to a bill of particulars, or the defendant fails to provide requested grounds of defense, the court may enter summary judgment against the non-responsive party.

A defendant may also file a counterclaim against the plaintiff, or a cross-claim against a co-defendant, at any point before the trial begins, so long as the amount is within the jurisdictional limits of the GDC. Failure to file a counterclaim, however, does not effect a waiver of that counterclaim. A defendant may implead a third party anytime within ten days after service of process has been effected, up until the trial date, so long as the third party receives effective service of process. However, Virginia law prohibits a defendant from impleading a joint tortfeasor against whom the plaintiff is prohibited from recovering (such as plaintiff's employer in a negligent injury case, which would be covered by the state's workman's compensation). Virginia law does not recognize the doctrine of necessary and indispensable parties, so the inability to implead a party will not affect the court's jurisdiction over the case.

The GDC can also entertain interpleader causes of action, allowing a party holding something of value to force all competing claimants to litigate which of them has the superior claim. As with other causes of action, the jurisdictional limitations must be met. It must be remembered that the GDC has no injunctive power; while the Circuit Courts can issue injunctions prohibiting parties from litigating the interpleader claim in other forums, the GDC can not prevent this. Finally, there is no right of intervention in GDC proceedings; a third party that wishes to become a party to a pending case can not do so except on a motion of an existing party to the case.

=== Discovery and trial ===
There is virtually no pretrial discovery available at the GDC level. However, a witness may be compelled to appear at the trial itself through a subpoena, and may be required to bring documents through a subpoena duces tecum. The party seeking to subpoena a witness must file a request for subpoena at least 15 days before trial, or else they will have to show "good cause" for why a subpoena should issue.

As there are no juries in the GDC, trial is relatively fast and informal. Evidence is presented by oral testimony of witnesses, although personal injury damages may be proved by written records from a hospital or health care provider. If a written medical report by a health care provider is introduced, the party seeking to introduce it must notify the other party at least 10 days before the trial. The health care provider must swear out a statement affirming that they treated this patient and attesting that the report fully describes the injury, and is true and accurate as to the description of the injury and any statement of costs.

=== Post-trial motions ===
A party seeking a rehearing of a judgment must file the motion requesting this relief within 21 days of entry of the judgment. The cases are divided on whether the court must rule on the motion during the 21-day period.

== Appeals ==
Appeals from the GDC for civil matters in excess of $50, and for all criminal and traffic cases, go to the Virginia Circuit Court, where they are re-tried de novo (because the GDC does not generate a record to be reviewed for error). The appellant in the Circuit Court will then be entitled to a jury trial, even if they were not entitled to one in the GDC. If the case is a criminal case or traffic infraction, the appellant will automatically receive a jury trial in the Circuit Court unless they affirmatively waive this right. For civil cases on appeal, the appellant must request a jury; if no such request is made, then the appeal will be heard by a Circuit Court judge alone. Cases heard in the GDC may not be directly appealed to any court other than the Circuit Court, although the decisions of the Circuit Court are subject to further appellate review. In determining whether the matter exceeds $50, the Circuit Court looks to the recovery achieved by the plaintiff. If, for example, the plaintiff seeks $3,000 and recovers $2,960, the plaintiff will have no right to appeal, but the defendant will (having been assessed a judgment well in excess of $50). On retrial in the Circuit Court brought about by an appeal from the defendant, the plaintiff may seek leave to amend to increase the claim to an amount in excess of the $25,000 limitation of the GDC.

To appeal a case from the GDC to the Circuit Court, a notice of appeal must be filed with the clerk of the GDC within 10 days after a judgment or conviction has been entered by the GDC. The appellant must then post a bond and pay a writ tax in the GDC within 30 days of the judgment, or within 10 days of the judgment if the case is one of unlawful detainer.

== See also ==
- District courts: United States
- Judiciary of Virginia
