= Virginia Circuit Court =

The Virginia Circuit Courts are the state trial courts of general jurisdiction in the Commonwealth of Virginia. The Circuit Courts have jurisdiction to hear civil and criminal cases. For civil cases, the courts have authority to try cases with an amount in controversy of more than $4,500 and have exclusive original jurisdiction over claims for more than $25,000. In criminal matters, the Circuit Courts are the trial courts for all felony charges and for misdemeanors originally charged there. The Circuit Courts also have appellate jurisdiction for any case from the Virginia General District Courts (the trial courts of limited jurisdiction in Virginia) claiming more than $50, which are tried de novo in the Circuit Courts.

The state has 120 courts divided among 31 judicial circuits. Judges of the Virginia Circuit Courts are appointed by the legislature, and serve an eight-year term, after which they may be reappointed. The only mandatory qualification for appointment as a Circuit Court Judge is having been admitted to the Virginia State Bar for at least five years. Each Circuit Court has at least one judge, and possibly more, although trials are before a single judge.

== Jurisdiction and venue ==
The Circuit Courts are courts of general jurisdiction, meaning that they can hear all manner of civil and criminal matters, with limited exceptions. The original jurisdiction of the Circuit Courts over civil matters extends only to those matters valued at over $4,500. For actions alleging a lower amount in controversy, jurisdiction lies with the Virginia General District Court (GDC). However, the Circuit Courts can hear appeals from the GDC for matters valued over $50. Such appeals are heard de novo. The Circuit Courts do not, however, have jurisdiction over rate cases or workers' compensation cases. The former are committed to the jurisdiction of the State Corporation Commission, the latter by the Virginia Workers' Compensation Commission. The Circuit Courts have exclusive original jurisdiction in domestic relations matters (such as divorce, annulment, and child custody), and over the probate of wills.

=== Personal jurisdiction ===
The GDC must also be able to exercise personal jurisdiction over the defendant, which may be premised on the defendant's physical presence in the jurisdiction, or on the occurrence of some element of the cause of action in the jurisdiction. Personal jurisdiction is predicated on Virginia's long-arm statute, which generally permits Virginia courts to exercise personal jurisdiction over a party that resides in Virginia, or transacts substantial business in Virginia, or who caused an actionable injury in Virginia. With respect to domestic relations matters, personal jurisdiction attaches to a person who bears or fathers a child in Virginia. For purposes of A party may waive a lack of personal jurisdiction, but may also appear in court to contest personal jurisdiction without thereby waiving the issue.

=== Venue ===
In terms of venue, where personal jurisdiction lies in multiple districts, the appropriate venue for the case to be heard is set forth by Virginia statutes, which divides possible venues as "Category A" (preferred) and "Category B" (permissible), and requires that Category B venue may only be used where no Category A venue is available. For example, in a dispute over the ownership of land, Category A venue lies where the land is located. Where the dispute involves a request for injunctive relief, venue lies in the place where the activity to be enjoined is occurring or is anticipated to occur.

Category B venue is much more expansive. It generally lies where the defendant resides or has their principal place of employment, or has a registered office or registered agent, or where some part of the action arose. It also lies in any place where the cause of action, or a part thereof, arose. Various other considerations arise where there are multiple parties, or out of state parties.

== Virginia Circuit Court civil procedure ==
=== Initiating litigation ===
Litigation is initiated by the filing of a complaint, which is then served on the defendant with a summons, pursuant to the rules governing service of process in Virginia.

=== General rules of pleading ===
Virginia requires "fact pleading," meaning that the pleadings must set forth all of the facts alleged by the plaintiff upon which the cause of action is based, and these facts must "inform the opposing party as to the true nature of the claim." The facts must be set forth in numbered paragraphs, although a party asserting negligence need not specify which negligent conduct is alleged to have caused the injury. It is not necessary to allege jurisdiction or venue, although it is necessary to specify the relief sought in a "prayer for relief," and within the prayer to specify the dollar amount sought in damages in an ad damnum clause. A prayer for punitive damages must be identified in a separate paragraph. Documents (such as a contract alleged to have been breached) may be annexed to the pleadings, and are thereby incorporated into them. If a document that should be attached to the pleadings is omitted, the defendant can file a "motion craving oyer", which requests the annexation of that document. If granted, the document will be attached to, and will become part of, the complaint itself.

An attorney filing documents with the court, including pleadings, must sign the documents. The attorney thereby certifies that he has read them, that they are grounded in fact or law as determined by a good-faith investigation, and that they are not being filed for the purposes of harassment or delay. An attorney who violates these rules can be held liable for the costs and attorney's fees incurred by the other party in responding to the document. A document that is not signed by the attorney may be stricken. Where a party is not represented by counsel, the party must sign the documents himself, and thereby make the foregoing certifications.

Alternative pleading is permitted, so a party may plead inconsistent facts as to different parties, and leave it to the jury to determine which proposed set of facts were the true facts of the case, so long as all causes of action arise from the same transaction or occurrence. If an unrelated claim is joined, however, this claim will be stricken as a misjoinder.

==== Amendments to the pleadings ====
Virginia pleading practice differs from that of federal courts and many other states in that it offers no amendments to the pleadings as of right. If a plaintiff files an amended complaint, and the defendant responds to that pleading, both the filing and the response are a legal nullity. A party must instead seek and receive leave to amend before any amended pleading will be accepted, even if that amended pleading is filed before any response to the initial pleading has been received. However, Virginia courts are generally liberal in allowing parties to amend, absent undue delay or prejudice to a party.

=== Responding to the complaint ===
Once service has been effected, the defendant has 21 days to file a responsive pleading. The pleading may simply be an answer, or the defendant may file a demurrer, a motion to dismiss, an objection to venue, a motion for a bill of particulars, or a statement of the defendant's grounds of defense. If the defendant objects to personal jurisdiction, the defendant must make a special appearance to assert either that the court lacks personal jurisdiction, or that service of process was never made. Such a motion can not be joined with any other motion. An objection based on service that was made, but was made in a faulty manner, is called a motion to quash process, and can be filed in conjunction with a pleading responsive to the merits of the case. A defendant's objections to venue must state not only why the venue chosen is improper, but must also indicate where proper venue would lie (although a court maintains the power to transfer even if the objection to venue is defective). The defendant may also file a counterclaim against the plaintiff, a cross-claim against any co-defendant, or an impleader against a third party who the defendant feels should be brought in as a co-defendant. However, there is no such thing as a compulsory counterclaim in Virginia; a cause of action that a defendant has against the plaintiff may be brought as a counterclaim, or may be brought in an entirely separate case. A third party may also seek to enter the case by filing an intervention.

==== The demurrer ====
A demurrer challenges the sufficiency of a claim for affirmative relief, and can address misjoined claims, lack of subject matter jurisdiction, and most importantly a failure to state a cause of action through a failure to allege some fact which is necessary for the claim to prevail. New facts may not be raised in a demurrer, so if the demurrer relates to a term in a contract which was not annexed to the original complaint, the defendant must first compel annexation of the contract through a motion craving oyer, and may file the demurrer once that annexation has occurred. A demurrer may be filed before or at the same time as an answer is filed, but not afterward, except with the permission of the court. If the demurrer is sustained, it is usually done so without prejudice and giving the plaintiff a set time to respond by filing an amended complaint which cures the defects of the original complaint.

==== Special pleas ====
Affirmative defenses asserted in Virginia are called "special pleas". A special plea alleges additional facts which would obviate the case, such as the passage of a statute of limitations, failure of a contract to meet the statute of frauds, or res judicata as to the action.

The defendant may also raise equitable defenses such as failure of consideration or unconscionability, which operate to diminish the value of the plaintiff's claim. This is referred to as "common law recoupment". By statute, Virginia has established that such defenses can be raised in response to a contractual damages claim, and that the defendant may even recover damages in excess of the plaintiff's claim. Under the statute, however, the court lacks the power to order reform or rescission of the contract.

==== The answer ====
The defendant may simply answer the claims raised by the plaintiff in a pleading which specifically responds to each of the plaintiff's allegations in corresponding numbered paragraphs.

Certain matters, when raised as a defense, must be sworn to by the defendant. These include claims that handwriting is not genuine, that an agency, partnership, or corporate relationship does not exist, or that the defendant does not own or operate property or an instrumentality at issue in the claim. Furthermore, in contract claims, the plaintiff may file an affidavit with the claim averring the amount of damages claimed, that the amount is justly due, and specifying a date from which interest should accrue. The defendant must then plead under oath that the plaintiff is not entitled to the damages sought, and if the plaintiff objects to the defendants failure to make such a plea within seven days, the objection will result in summary judgment for the plaintiff.

The plaintiff need not respond to anything in the answer, as it is presumed that all allegations in the answer are denied. The only exception is where the defendant demands a response to new matters raised in the answer.

=== Non-trial resolutions ===
==== Nonsuit ====
A nonsuit occurs where the plaintiff seeks voluntary dismissal of the case without prejudice prior to a resolution. In Virginia, one nonsuit may be taken as of right, so long as it filed before certain significant events have occurred in the case. It must be filed before any demurrer or special plea has been fully argued, and before any motion to strike evidence has been granted. In a jury trial, it can not be filed when the jury is retired from the bar, and is deliberating; it may be filed if the jury returns from deliberations deadlocked, resulting in a mistrial. In a bench trial, a nonsuit must be filed before the case has been submitted to the court for decision.

If the plaintiff chooses to refile the claim, this must be done within six months of the original nonsuit being granted. Although the plaintiff may obtain one nonsuit as a matter of right, the court retains the discretion to grant additional nonsuits with notice to the other parties. The court's order must specify the number of previous nonsuits, and the plaintiff must therefore inform the court of all previous nonsuits in requesting another.

If a counterclaim or crossclaim had been filed, a nonsuit could still be taken by the plaintiff with the agreement of the defendant, or if the defendant's claim could be adjudicated independently. The plaintiff can not use the nonsuit as a means to change venue to another Virginia state court – if the plaintiff seeks to refile the suit, he must refile in exactly the same court unless that court lacked jurisdiction or venue, or must show good cause to litigate elsewhere. However, a nonsuit does not prohibit the plaintiff from refiling the same suit in another state, or in a federal court in Virginia. The decision of the court to allow the plaintiff to take a nonsuit is not appealable, unless the defendant had objected to the nonsuit before the trial court.

==== Default and default judgment ====
In Virginia, default is filed automatically if the defendant fails to respond in any way within 21 days of service of process being effected. A defendant that defaults thereby waives further notice of proceedings (unless the defendant has an attorney of record), and waives the right to a jury trial in any further proceedings. However, entry of a default does not by itself resolve the plaintiff's claim. The plaintiff must then move for a default judgment against the defendant. Where the case is premised on liquidated damages, such as a breach of a promissory note, then judgment will be entered in that amount. If damaged are unliquidated, however, the plaintiff must move for a hearing on damages, which will be decided by the court unless the plaintiff demands a jury on the damages claim. A defendant who has defaulted may still appear at the damages hearing to contest the amount of damages, but can not challenge liability.

==== Summary judgment ====
Summary judgment is rarely granted in Virginia courts because it is easy for either party to raise a triable issue of fact. Unlike federal courts, where claims must be accompanied by an affidavit in order to raise a fact issue, Virginia courts treat the pleadings themselves as allegations of fact sufficient to create a genuine issue for resolution by a trial. Summary judgment in Virginia is not available in divorce and annulment cases.

== Rules specific to the Circuit Court ==
=== Discovery and trial ===
Either party may seek discovery on any topic that is relevant to the subject matter involved in the pending action, irrespective of whether the discovered materials would be admissible at trial, or even whether they are calculated to lead to admissible information. Deadlines to respond to discovery requests are usually 21 days. Parties may propound a maximum of 30 interrogatories on one another (including subparts), but there is no set limit on the number of depositions that can be taken, or the number of times a single witness may be deposed. An attorney may also issue a subpoena duces tecum. Where a witness to a case is about to leave the jurisdiction, a deposition of that witness may be taken within 21 days of filing a case; otherwise, a court order would be required to take early depositions. Alternately a party could seek perpetuation of the testimony of the witness pursuant to a verified petition filed in the jurisdiction in which the defendant resides.

Discovery is somewhat narrower in cases of divorce, habeas corpus, eminent domain.

=== Jury trial ===
==== Right to a jury ====
There is no Seventh Amendment right to jury trials in state courts, but the state provides for jury trials to the same extent as in federal courts. This means that juries are available to try cases at law, but usually not in equity. However, a party may request a jury to decide facts regarding the facts of an equitable matter. If the contested matter is a special plea, then the decision of the jury is binding, but where there is a conflict of evidence as to other matters, the jury is merely advisory.

A jury must be specifically requested by a party, and this demand must be made within ten days following service of process of the last pleading to raise an issue capable of being tried to a jury. If neither party requests a jury, then both will have been deemed to waive the right, and the case may be tried by the judge alone. However, the judge may still elect to empanel a jury to decide questions of fact.

==== Jury selection ====
Juries in Virginia are generally made of five people where the amount in controversy is $25,000 or less, or seven people where the amount in controversy is more than $25,000. Each side receives three peremptory challenges, which may not be exercised in a racially or sexually discriminative manner, along with an unlimited number of challenges for cause. Usually, more jurors than are needed are empaneled in case a juror must be excused. An unusual procedure exists whereby the parties can agree to have a three-person jury. In that case, each side will be permitted to select one juror, and those two jurors select the third from among the jury pool. Objections to jury instructions must be raised before the instructions are read to the jury.

==== Trial practice ====
The court generally has a great deal of discretion in terms of giving the jury access to evidence and exhibits, but is barred by statute from allowing the jury to read the pleadings, and also may not personally opine on the credibility of the witnesses. The judge may also grant a motion to sequester non-party witnesses, thereby prohibiting them from watching the testimony of other witnesses, although the judge retains discretion to permit a sequestered witness to testify even if that witness did improperly view other testimony.

Evidence is presented at trial through testimony presented ore tenus – that is, oral testimony presented by a witness live and on the stand – or through depositions. Where equitable claims are tried, testimony is most frequently by deposition, unless the court has opted to empanel an advisory jury, in which case oral testimony is the norm.

In Virginia, the jury must render a unanimous verdict, and anything less than a unanimous jury constitutes a hung jury and therefore a mistrial, unless the parties agree otherwise in advance. The jury may award no more than the amount sought in the complaint, which acts as a ceiling to the verdict. After rendering a verdict, jury members may be questioned to determine if any misconduct occurred, but the reasoning by which the verdict was reached may not be questioned.

=== Bench trial ===
A bench trial is conducted with the judge hearing all witnesses and deciding on their credibility. The judge may appoint a commissioner to hear evidence and make recommendations if the parties and the court agree to it, or if the court finds good cause on the facts of the case to have one.

=== Post-trial practice ===
Virginia has a motion called a "motion to strike the evidence", which functions exactly the same as a motion for judgment as a matter of law in most other courts. Such a motion is made at the close of evidence (before the jury deliberates, if there is a jury). Where such a motion is granted, summary judgment will be entered. Where a contrary jury verdict is entered, a party may also file a "motion to set aside the verdict as contrary to the evidence", and unlike many other courts, Virginia courts may entertain this motion even if no equivalent pre-verdict motion has been made.

Once a judgment has been entered by the court (or a decree has been issued, if the case is in equity), the court retains jurisdiction over the case for 21 days. This period is referred to as the time for which the case is "in the breast of the court", and during this time the court has complete discretion to suspend, vacate, or amend its judgment or decree. After 21 days, jurisdiction lapses, even if the court is considering post-judgment motions. However, a party may file a "bill of review" to correct errors on the face of the record for up to six months, and a judgment obtained by a fraud on the court may be vacated for up to two years after entry of the judgment.

While the case is in the breast of the court, either party may move for a new trial based on any among a wide range of bases, particularly misconduct on the part of some party. Such a motion may also be premised on the discovery of new evidence, if the moving party can allege that its failure to present that evidence at the original trial was not due to a lack of diligence. A party may also seek a new trial if the damages returned are so high, or so low, as to "shock the conscience". In such a case, the judge may order a new trial as to all issues if damages were inseparable from liability, or as to damages alone if liability was well established. Alternately, the judge could order additur or remittitur, requiring the other party to either accept a stated award of a higher or lower amount, or face a new trial. The party against whom the additur or remittitur is pressed may accept the change without protest, accept with protest and appeal the order, or reject the change and have a new trial. If the latter option is taken, the protesting party may later appeal the court's decision to require a new trial. Where additur is ordered, however, both parties must accept the increased amount.

== Appellate jurisdiction ==
The Circuit Court has jurisdiction to hear appeals from the General District Court for civil matters in excess of $50, and for all criminal and traffic cases. Cases thus appealed are re-tried de novo (because the GDC does not generate a record to be reviewed for error). The appellant in the Circuit Court will then be entitled to a jury trial, even if they were not entitled to one in the GDC. If the case is a criminal case or traffic infraction, the appellant will automatically receive a jury trial in the Circuit Court unless they affirmatively waive this right. For civil cases on appeal, the appellant must request a jury; if no such request is made, then the appeal will be heard by a Circuit Court judge alone. Cases heard in the GDC may not be directly appealed to any court other than the Circuit Court, although the decisions of the Circuit Court are subject to further appellate review. In determining whether the matter exceeds $50, the Circuit Court looks to the recovery achieved by the plaintiff. If, for example, the plaintiff seeks $3,000 and recovers $2,960, the plaintiff will have no right to appeal, but the defendant will (having been assessed a judgment well in excess of $50). On retrial in the Circuit Court brought about by an appeal from the defendant, the plaintiff may seek leave to amend to increase the claim to an amount in excess of the $25,000 limitation of the GDC.

The Circuit Court also has appellate jurisdiction in certain administrative law matters and can also review the actions of certain local government agencies, such as a Board of Zoning Appeals, by writ of certiorari. By statute, the Circuit Court of the City of Richmond has jurisdiction over administrative appeals that are to be heard in a Circuit Court if venue is not otherwise proper in any specific circuit.

== Appeals from the Circuit Court ==
An appeal from the Circuit Court may be taken to the Court of Appeals of Virginia in limited cases (domestic relations and certain administrative matters), but appeals of general civil judgments are directed to the exclusive appellate jurisdiction of the Virginia Supreme Court. An appeal may only be taken from a decision to which the appealing party objected with reasonable certainty at the time that the decision was made.

In order to perfect an appeal, the appellant must file a notice of appeal with the Clerk of the Circuit Court within thirty days of the appealable judgment or decree. A post-judgment motion does not extend the time for an appeal unless the Circuit Court has suspended the judgment. A copy of the notice of appeal must be mailed or otherwise delivered to counsel for all parties, stating that the appellant will file either a written summary of the trial, or a transcript which the appellant certifies has been ordered from the court reporter. If a written summary is used instead of a transcript, the appellant must file this document with the Clerk of the Circuit Court within 55 days of the decision which is being appealed. The Clerk of the Circuit Court will then prepare a record containing all pleadings, exhibits, and orders, and will transmit that to the higher court.

The appellant must also post a supersedeas bond if they wish to prevent the other party from collecting on any judgment that was awarded in the trial court; an appealing plaintiff must post an appeal bond, but only after the appeal has been granted. A petition for appeal must be filed with the Virginia Supreme Court within three months of the decision under appeal. The Virginia Supreme Court may deny the petition, or it may grant the petition and will then send a Certificate of Appeal to all parties.

Criminal matters may be appealed to the Court of Appeals, but death penalty cases are appealed directly to the Virginia Supreme Court.

== See also ==
- Circuit court
- Judiciary of Virginia
