= List of justices of the Supreme Court of Virginia =

This is a list of past and present judges of the Supreme Court of Virginia. The court's name was the Supreme Court of Appeals until it was changed in 1971. Members were titled Judge until a 1928 constitutional amendment changed the title to Justice and designated the presiding member Chief Justice.

== Current justices ==
The court presently is made up of seven justices, each elected by a majority vote of both houses of the General Assembly for a term of twelve years. To be eligible for election, a candidate must be a resident of Virginia and must have been a member of the Virginia State Bar for at least five years. Vacancies on the court occurring between sessions of the General Assembly may be filled by the Governor for a term expiring thirty days after the commencement of the next session of the General Assembly. The Chief Justice presently is chosen by a vote of the seven justices for a term of four years. There is no statutory limit to the number of four-year terms to which a Chief Justice may be elected. However, the Court has stated that the justices internally adopted a two-term limit.

State law requires justices, like all Virginia jurists, to retire no later than twenty days after the commencement of the next regular session of the General Assembly following their seventy-third birthday. The court may designate up to five retired justices to serve as senior justices, each for a renewable one-year term. Senior justices may sit with the court either to hear petitions for appeal or to hear cases on the merits, particularly to replace any of the seven active justices who may be recused from hearing a specific case. In addition, a retired justice who has not been designated as a senior justice may sit with the court by special designation.

=== Active justices ===
Name	Born	Start	Term ends	Mandatory retirement	Law school	Partisan control at election	
Name	Born	Start	Term ends	Mandatory retirement	Law school	House of Delegates	Senate
Cleo Powell, Chief Justice	January 12, 1957 (age 69)	August 1, 2011 (Note: Re-elected to second 12-year term that began on August 1, 2023.)	July 31, 2035	January 28, 2031	Virginia	Republican (+18)	Democratic (+4)
Cleo Powell, Chief Justice	January 12, 1957 (age 69)	August 1, 2011	July 31, 2035	January 28, 2031	Virginia	Republican (+4)	Democratic (+4)
D. Arthur Kelsey	October 9, 1961 (age 64)	February 1, 2015	January 31, 2027	January 30, 2035	William and Mary	Republican (+34)	Republican (+1)
Stephen R. McCullough	February 15, 1972 (age 54)	March 3, 2016	March 2, 2028	January 30, 2046	Richmond	Republican (+32)	Republican (+2)
Teresa M. Chafin	October 4, 1955 (age 70)	September 1, 2019	August 31, 2031	January 30, 2029	Richmond	Republican (+2)	Republican (+2)
Wesley G. Russell Jr.	1970 (age 55–56)	July 1, 2022	June 30, 2034	February 2, 2044	George Mason	Republican (+4)	Democratic (+4)
Thomas P. Mann	March 11, 1965 (age 61)	August 1, 2022	July 31, 2034	February 1, 2039	American	Republican (+4)	Democratic (+4)
Junius P. Fulton III	1958 (age 67–68)	January 1, 2026	December 31, 2037	February 3, 2032	William and Mary	Democratic (+2)	Democratic (+2)

=== Senior justices ===
Name	Active start	Active end	Senior status start	Law school
LeRoy F. Millette Jr.	August 19, 2008	July 31, 2015	July 31, 2015	William and Mary
William C. Mims	April 1, 2010	March 31, 2022	March 31, 2022	GWU; Georgetown (LLM)

== Former justices ==
=== Members ex officio (1778–88) ===
The Constitution of 1776 provided for a Supreme Court of Appeals but did not specify its structure, leaving the General Assembly to organize the court by statute. The first such statute was enacted at the October 1778 legislative session. From that time until 1788, no one was appointed or elected specifically to serve on the Supreme Court of Appeals. Rather, the court was made up of the three judges of the High Court of Chancery, the five judges of the General Court, and the three judges of the Court of Admiralty, each of whom was elected by the General Assembly to life terms on those courts and served on the Supreme Court of Appeals ex officio.

The following judges were members of the court by virtue of having been elected judges of the High Court of Chancery, the General Court, and the Court of Admiralty, in the courts' order of precedence under the statute. The terms listed below run from each member's accession to those respective courts, which were created in 1776 and 1777, before the Supreme Court of Appeals was created. Ex officio membership ended on December 24, 1788, when the Supreme Court of Appeals became a separate body with five judges.

The High Court of Chancery:

- Edmund Pendleton, January 14, 1778 – December 24, 1788
- George Wythe, January 14, 1778 – December 24, 1788
- Robert Carter Nicholas Sr., January 14, 1778 – November 1780
- John Blair Jr., November 23, 1780 – December 24, 1788

The General Court:

- Paul Carrington, January 23, 1778 – December 24, 1788
- Thomas Mason, January 23, 1778 – May 28, 1778
- Joseph Jones, January 23, 1778 – October 1779
- John Blair Jr., January 23, 1778 – November 23, 1780
- John Tazewell, May 29, 1778 – November 1781
- Bartholomew Dandridge, May 29, 1778 – April 1785
- Peter Lyons, October 20, 1779 – December 24, 1788
- William Fleming, November 25, 1780 – December 24, 1788
- James Mercer, November 30, 1781 – December 24, 1788
- Henry Tazewell, April 25, 1785 – December 24, 1788
- Edmund Winston, December 11, 1788 – December 24, 1788

The Court of Admiralty:

- Richard Cary, December 17, 1776 – December 24, 1788
- Benjamin Holt, December 17, 1776 – unknown
- Bernard Moore, December 17, 1776 – unknown
- Benjamin Waller, May 1779 – December 1785
- William Roscoe Wilson Curl, May 1779 – unknown
- James Henry, unknown – December 24, 1788
- John Tyler, December 20, 1785 – December 24, 1788

=== Members since 1788 ===
In December 1788, within the broad authority provided by the Constitution of 1776, the General Assembly re-organized the Supreme Court of Appeals as a separate court with five judges elected by the legislature to life terms. The General Assembly elected two incumbent judges of the High Court of Chancery and three incumbent judges of the General Court as the first judges of the Supreme Court of Appeals in their own right. While the court has remained separate ever since, the number of seats has varied. In January 1807, while one of the five seats was vacant, the General Assembly reduced the number to four with the provision that it be further reduced to three upon the next vacancy. The number was restored to five in January 1811.

The next significant alteration to the court came with the Constitution of 1851. It provided for the popular election of judges to the court, one from each of five districts, and imposed a twelve-year term. As the Emancipation Proclamation became effective in Virginia during the American Civil War (particularly after the Commonwealth surrendered in April 1865 and 13th Amendment became effective in December 1865), the 1851 Constitution's authorization of slavery became illegal under federal law. Thus, Virginia needed a new Constitution.

Federal authorities in occupied areas called a convention with delegates from occupied areas only, which proclaimed the Constitution of 1864. Although voters statewide never were asked to authorize it in a referendum, it came into (disputed) effect, until a new state Constitution was adopted by popular referendum, then undisputedly came into effect in 1870. Federal military authorities allowed voters statewide to elect delegates to the Virginia Constitutional Convention of 1868. Virginia voters overwhelmingly ratified that document the following year, except for certain provisions penalizing former Confederates, which failed. The Constitution of 1864 had ended popular election of judges, instead providing (for the first time) that the General Assembly would elect the judges from candidates nominated by the Governor. It also reduced the court to three judges. On June 3, 1869, during Congressional Reconstruction, Major General John Schofield (who governed Virginia as Military District No. 1 and also led efforts to allow separate votes on the proposed Constitution and anti-Confederate provisions), dismissed all three elected judges because a new federal law required removal of officials in Texas and Virginia with any record of service to the Confederacy. On June 9, Schofield appointed three Union sympathizers (whom he had previously appointed judges of lower courts, where they had performed satisfactorily) as their replacements. Those three judges served (and issued binding rulings) until the new state Constitution came into effect and legislators elected replacements.

The post-Reconstruction Constitution of 1870 eliminated the short-lived provision for gubernatorial nominations, as well as restored the court to five judges. None of the three Union men was elected to the Court by the General Assembly. Legislators did elect two of the three judges elected by voters, and three additional judges. Legislation also allowed the court's members to elect their President, and in March 1870, the new Court elected R.C.L. Moncure (who had the most seniority) their President (the third man to hold that title).

The Constitution of 1902 staggered the five seats by requiring that at the next election of judges, one judge would be elected to a term of 4 years, one to a term of 6 years, one to a term of 8 years, one to a term of 10 years, and one to a term of 12 years. It perpetuated this staggering by providing that any new judge elected to fill a vacancy would serve only the unexpired portion of his predecessor's term.

In 1906, the General Assembly re-elected each of the five incumbent judges, whose terms were all due to expire the following January 1, to fill the newly staggered seats. An amendment ratified in 1928 increased the number of seats to seven but it did not stagger the two new seats. The Constitution of 1971 eliminated the staggering of seats by providing that any new judge elected to fill a vacancy serve a full twelve-year term.

These are the former members of the court from 1788, in order of their accession to office. Those who served as presiding officer are designated by italics.

- Edmund Pendleton, December 24, 1788 – October 23, 1803
- John Blair Jr., December 24, 1788 – September 30, 1789
- Paul Carrington, December 24, 1788 – January 1, 1807
- Peter Lyons, December 24, 1788 – July 30, 1809
- William Fleming, December 24, 1788 – February 15, 1824
- James Mercer, November 14, 1789 – October 1793
- Henry Tazewell, November 6, 1793 – November 1794
- Spencer Roane, April 13, 1795 – September 4, 1822
- St. George Tucker, April 11, 1804 – April 2, 1811
- James Pleasants, January 30, 1811 – March 1811
- Francis T. Brooke, March 4, 1811 – March 3, 1851
- William H. Cabell, April 3, 1811 – 1852
- John Coalter, June 1, 1811 – March 23, 1831
- John W. Green, October 11, 1822 – February 5, 1834
- Dabney Carr, February 24, 1824 – January 8, 1837
- Henry St. George Tucker Sr., March 1831 – 1841
- William Brockenbrough, February 20, 1834 – December 10, 1838
- Richard E. Parker, February 9, 1837 – September 10, 1840
- Robert Stanard, January 19, 1839 – May 14, 1846
- John J. Allen, December 14, 1840 – 1866
- Briscoe Baldwin, January 29, 1842 – 1852
- William Daniel, December 15, 1846 – 1866
- Richard C. L. Moncure, March 13, 1851 – June 3, 1869, 1870 – August 24, 1882
- Green Berry Samuels, 1852 – January 5, 1859
- George Hay Lee, 1852 – 1866
- William J. Robertson, May 1859 – 1866
- Lucas P. Thompson, 1866 (elected but died prior to taking office)
- William T. Joynes, 1866 – June 3, 1869, 1870 – March 2, 1872
- Alexander Rives, 1866 – June 3, 1869
- Horace Blois Burnham (June 9, 1869 – February 22, 1870)
- Orloff M. Dorman (June 9, 1869 – March 1, 1870)
- Westel Willoughby (June 9, 1869 – March 1, 1870)
- Joseph Christian January 1, 1871 – 1883
- Waller Redd Staples, January 1, 1871 – January 1, 1883
- Francis T. Anderson, January 1, 1871 – January 1, 1883
- Wood Bouldin, April 10, 1872 – October 10, 1876
- Edward C. Burks, November 1876 – January 1, 1883
- Lunsford L. Lewis, August 28, 1882 – January 1, 1895
- Robert A. Richardson, January 1, 1883 – January 1, 1895
- Thomas T. Fauntleroy, January 1, 1883 – January 1, 1895
- Drury A. Hinton, January 1, 1883 – January 1, 1895
- Benjamin W. Lacy, January 1, 1883 – January 1, 1895
- John W. Riely, January 1, 1895 – August 20, 1900
- John Alexander Buchanan, January 1, 1895 – January 12, 1916
- James Keith, January 1, 1895 – June 10, 1916
- Richard H. Cardwell, January 1, 1895 – November 16, 1916
- George Moffett Harrison, January 1, 1895 – March 6, 1917
- Archer Allen Phlegar, October 1, 1900 – February 1901
- Stafford G. Whittle, March 1901 – December 31, 1919
- Joseph L. Kelly, January 12, 1916 – January 31, 1924; March 10, 1925 – April 14, 1925
- Robert R. Prentis, December 16, 1916 – November 25, 1931
- Frederick W. Sims, February 8, 1917 – June 12, 1925
- Martin P. Burks, March 22, 1917 – April 30, 1928
- Edward W. Saunders, March 9, 1920 – December 16, 1921
- Jesse F. West, February 1, 1922 – October 25, 1929
- Preston W. Campbell, January 31, 1924 – October 1, 1946
- Richard Henry Lee Chichester, June 1, 1925 – February 3, 1930
- Henry W. Holt, June 1, 1928 – October 4, 1947
- Louis S. Epes, November 20, 1929 – February 14, 1935
- Herbert B. Gregory, February 1, 1930 – March 9, 1951
- Edward W. Hudgins, February 1, 1930 – July 29, 1958
- George L. Browning, February 19, 1930 – August 16, 1947
- Joseph W. Chinn, December 3, 1931 – August 16, 1936
- John W. Eggleston, February 26, 1935 – October 1, 1969
- Claude V. Spratley, August 27, 1936 – September 30, 1967
- Archibald C. Buchanan, October 1, 1946 – October 1, 1969
- Abram Penn Staples, October 7, 1947 – January 15, 1951
- Willis D. Miller, November 17, 1947 – December 20, 1960
- Lemuel F. Smith, February 15, 1951 – October 15, 1956
- Kennon C. Whittle, March 14, 1951 – February 1, 1965
- Harold Fleming Snead, January 14, 1957 – September 30, 1974
- Lawrence W. I'Anson, September 3, 1958 – January 31, 1981
- Harry L. Carrico, January 30, 1961 – January 31, 2003
- Thomas C. Gordon, February 17, 1965 – May 31, 1972
- Albertis Harrison, October 23, 1967 – December 31, 1981
- Alexander Harman, October 1, 1969 – December 31, 1979
- George M. Cochran, October 1, 1969 – April 20, 1987
- Richard Harding Poff, August 31, 1972 – December 31, 1988
- Christian Compton, October 1, 1974 – February 2, 2000
- William Carrington Thompson, February 19, 1980 – March 2, 1983
- Roscoe B. Stephenson Jr., March 2, 1981 – July 1, 1997
- John Charles Thomas, April 25, 1983 – November 1, 1989
- Henry H. Whiting, April 30, 1987 – August 12, 1995
- Elizabeth B. Lacy, January 4, 1989 – August 16, 2007
- Leroy R. Hassell Sr., December 28, 1989 – February 9, 2011
- Barbara Milano Keenan, July 2, 1991 – March 12, 2010
- Cynthia D. Kinser, July 8, 1997 – December 31, 2014
- Donald W. Lemons, March 16, 2000 – February 1, 2022
- G. Steven Agee, March 1, 2003 – June 30, 2008
- William C. Mims, April 1, 2010 – March 31, 2022
- Elizabeth A. McClanahan, August 1, 2011 – September 1, 2019
- Jane Marum Roush, August 1, 2015 – February 12, 2016

==== Succession of seats between 1895 and 2022 ====
In 1895, for the first time, the General Assembly elected a full bench of five new judges. Consequently, any line of succession between a specific justice of the current court and a judge elected before 1895 necessarily would be arbitrary. However, when the General Assembly re-elected the incumbent judges in 1906 to fill the staggered seats created by the Constitution of 1902, it elected a specific judge to each seat: it re-elected Judge Cardwell for 4 years, Judge Whittle for 6, Judge Buchanan for 8, Judge Keith for 10, and Judge Harrison for 12. It therefore was possible to trace the line of succession of each of these seats, and the two new seats created in 1928, to its successive occupants.

Seat 1
Designated for a 4-year term in 1906
Member	Acceded	Vacated
Richard H. Cardwell	Jan. 1, 1895	Nov. 16, 1916
Robert R. Prentis	Dec. 16, 1916	Nov. 25, 1931
Joseph W. Chinn	Dec. 3, 1931	Aug. 16, 1936
Claude V. Spratley	Aug. 27, 1936	Sept. 30, 1967
Albertis Harrison	Oct. 23, 1967	Dec. 31, 1981
Charles S. Russell	Mar. 1, 1982	July 1, 1991
Barbara Milano Keenan	July 2, 1991	Mar. 12, 2010
William C. Mims	April 1, 2010	Mar. 31, 2022
Thomas P. Mann	Aug. 1, 2022

Seat 2
Designated for a 6-year term in 1906
Member	Acceded	Vacated
John W. Riely	Jan. 1, 1895	Aug. 20, 1900
Archer Allen Phlegar	Oct. 1, 1900	Jan. 1901
Stafford G. Whittle	Mar. 1901	Dec. 31, 1919
Edward W. Saunders	Mar. 9, 1920	Dec. 16, 1921
Jesse F. West	Feb. 1, 1922	Oct. 25, 1929
Louis S. Epes	Nov. 20, 1929	Feb. 14, 1935
John W. Eggleston	Feb. 26, 1935	Oct. 1, 1969
George M. Cochran	Oct. 1, 1969	Apr. 20, 1987
Henry H. Whiting	Apr. 30, 1987	Aug. 12, 1995
Lawrence L. Koontz Jr.	Aug. 16, 1995	Feb. 1, 2011
Elizabeth A. McClanahan	Aug. 1, 2011	Sept. 1, 2019
Teresa M. Chafin	Sept. 1, 2019

Seat 3
Designated for an 8-year term in 1906
Member	Acceded	Vacated
John A. Buchanan	Jan. 1, 1895	Jan. 12, 1915
Joseph L. Kelly	Jan. 12, 1915	Jan. 31, 1924
Preston W. Campbell	Jan. 31, 1924	Oct. 1, 1946
Archibald C. Buchanan	Oct. 1, 1946	Oct. 1, 1969
Alexander Harman	Oct. 1, 1969	Dec. 31, 1979
William Carrington Thompson	Feb. 19, 1980	Mar. 2, 1983
John Charles Thomas	Apr. 25, 1983	Nov. 1, 1989
Leroy R. Hassell Sr.	Dec. 28, 1989	Feb. 9, 2011
Cleo Powell	Aug. 1, 2011

Seat 4
Designated for a 10-year term in 1906
Member	Acceded	Vacated
James Keith	Jan. 1, 1895	June 10, 1916
Frederick W. Sims	June 12, 1916	Feb. 8, 1925
Joseph L. Kelly	Mar. 10, 1925	Apr. 14, 1925
Richard Henry Lee Chichester	June 1, 1925	Feb. 3, 1930
George L. Browning	Feb. 19, 1930	Aug. 26, 1947
Abram Penn Staples	Oct. 7, 1947	Jan. 15, 1951
Lemuel F. Smith	Feb. 15, 1951	Oct. 15, 1956
Harold Fleming Snead	Jan. 14, 1957	Sept. 30, 1974
Christian Compton	Oct. 1, 1974	Feb. 2, 2000
Donald W. Lemons	Mar. 16, 2000	Feb. 1, 2022
Wesley G. Russell Jr.	July 1, 2022

Seat 5
Designated for a 12-year term in 1906
Member	Acceded	Vacated
George Moffett Harrison	Jan. 1, 1895	Mar. 6, 1917
Martin P. Burks	Mar. 22, 1917	Apr. 30, 1928
Henry W. Holt	June 1, 1928	Oct. 4, 1947
Willis D. Miller	Nov. 17, 1947	Dec. 20, 1960
Harry L. Carrico	Jan. 30, 1961	Jan. 31, 2003
G. Steven Agee	Mar. 1, 2003	June 30, 2008
LeRoy F. Millette Jr.	Aug. 19, 2008	July 31, 2015
Jane Marum Roush	Aug. 1, 2015	Feb. 12, 2016
Stephen R. McCullough	Mar. 3, 2016

Seat 6
Created June 19, 1928
Member	Acceded	Vacated
Herbert B. Gregory	Feb. 1, 1930	Mar. 9, 1951
Kennon C. Whittle	Mar. 14, 1951	Feb. 1, 1965
Thomas C. Gordon	Feb. 17, 1965	May 31, 1972
Richard Harding Poff	Aug. 31, 1972	Dec. 31, 1988
Elizabeth B. Lacy	Jan. 4, 1989	Aug. 16, 2007
S. Bernard Goodwyn	Oct. 10, 2007	Jan. 1, 2026
Junius P. Fulton III	Jan. 1, 2026

Seat 7
Created June 19, 1928
Member	Acceded	Vacated
Edward W. Hudgins	Feb. 1, 1930	July 29, 1958
Lawrence W. I'Anson	Sept. 3, 1958	Jan. 31, 1981
Roscoe B. Stephenson Jr.	Mar. 2, 1981	July 1, 1997
Cynthia D. Kinser	July 8, 1997	Dec. 31, 2014
D. Arthur Kelsey	Feb. 1, 2015
