= Naim v. Naim =

- Court: Supreme Court of Virginia
- Full case name: Han Say Naim v. Ruby Elaine Naim.
- Decided: June 13, 1955
- Citations: 197 Va. 80; 87 S.E.2d 749

Case history
- Appealed from: Circuit Court of the City of Portsmouth

Court membership
- Judges sitting: Edward W. Hudgins, John W. Eggleston, Claude V. Spratley, Archibald C. Buchanan, Willis D. Miller, Lemuel F. Smith, Kennon Caithness Whittle

Case opinions
- Majority: Buchanan, joined by unanimous

Keywords
- Anti-miscegenation law; Interracial marriage; Racism

Naim v. Naim, 197 Va. 80; 87 S.E.2d 749 (1955), is a case regarding interracial marriage. The case was decided by the Supreme Court of Virginia on June 13, 1955. The Court held the marriage between the appellant (Han Say Naim) and the appellee (Ruby Elaine Naim) to be void under the Code of Virginia (1950).

The appellee, a white woman living in Virginia, and the appellant, a Chinese man living outside of Virginia, went to North Carolina to be married on June 26, 1952, specifically because there was a Virginia statute, the Racial Integrity Act of 1924, banning interracial marriage, while North Carolina law banned marriages between whites and blacks but not between whites and Asians. They then returned to Virginia, where they lived as husband and wife.

A year after the marriage, Ruby Naim filed for annulment, as the marriage was in contravention of Virginia's miscegenation laws, with Han Say Naim arguing that a marriage valid in North Carolina was valid throughout the United States. The circuit court of the city of Portsmouth granted an annulment, but Han Say Naim appealed to the state supreme court, which upheld the circuit court's decision.

The Virginia statute stated:

It shall hereafter be unlawful for any white person in this State to marry any save a white person, or a person with no other admixture of blood than white and American Indian. For the purpose of this chapter, the term 'white person' shall apply only to such person as has no trace whatever of any blood other than Caucasian; but persons who have one-sixteenth or less of the blood of the American Indian and have no other non-Caucasic blood shall be deemed to be white persons. All laws heretofore passed and now in effect regarding the intermarriage of white and colored persons shall apply to marriages prohibited by this chapter

Han Say Naim's attorney, David Carliner, attempted to appeal the state's decision to the Supreme Court of the United States, with the backing of the American Jewish Congress, the Japanese American Citizens League, the Association on American Indian Affairs and the Association of Immigration and Nationality Lawyers. The justices, however, refused to consider the appeal, fearing that to do so would further encourage opposition to the enforcement of Brown v. Board of Education. Justice Tom C. Clark reportedly said, "one bombshell at a time is enough."

== See also ==
- Pace v. Alabama
- Plessy v. Ferguson
- Loving v. Virginia

== Further references ==
- Gregory Michael Dorr, "Principled Expediency: Eugenics, Naim v. Naim, and the Supreme Court", American Journal of Legal History 42 (1998): 119–159.
- Dennis J. Hutchinson, "Unanimity and Desegregation: Decisionmaking in the Supreme Court, 1948-1958", Georgetown Law Journal 68 (1979–80): 61–68.
