= Junius Edgar West =

American politician (1866–1947)

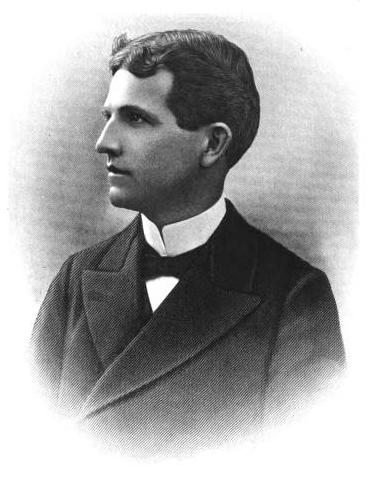
- West in 1908 publication

22nd Lieutenant Governor of Virginia
- In office February 1, 1922 – January 15, 1930
- Governor: Elbert L. Trinkle; Harry F. Byrd
- Preceded by: Benjamin F. Buchanan
- Succeeded by: James H. Price

Member of the Virginia Senate from the 30th district
- In office January 10, 1912 – January 11, 1922
- Preceded by: Edward E. Holland
- Succeeded by: Cecil C. Vaughan Jr.

Member of the Virginia House of Delegates from Nansemond County
- In office January 12, 1910 – January 10, 1912
- Preceded by: Robert W. Withers
- Succeeded by: Richard L. Brewer Jr.

Personal details
- Born: July 12, 1866 Sussex County, Virginia, U.S.
- Died: January 1, 1947 (aged 80) Richmond, Virginia, U.S.
- Party: Democratic
- Spouse: Margaret Olive Beale (m.1903)
- Children: 1
- Profession: Businessman (insurance), politician

Junius Edgar West (July 12, 1866 – January 1, 1947) was a Virginia politician and businessman who was born in Sussex County, Virginia, on July 12, 1866, and whose long and distinguished career culminated in two terms as the 22nd Lieutenant Governor of Virginia.

== Biography ==
West was the fifth son of Henry Thomas West and Susan Cox West. He was educated in public and private schools in Sussex County and matriculated in the college preparatory course at the Suffolk Collegiate Institute in Suffolk, Virginia. He attended college at the University of North Carolina and studied law at both Washington and Lee University and the University of Virginia.

Upon completion of his formal education he returned to Waverly, Virginia and became Superintendent of Sussex County Schools in 1889. As superintendent, West suggested innovations that would improve the system in Sussex; a nine-month school term, better qualified teachers with increased pay, better schoolhouses and furniture, and a reasonable compensation to trustees for their services.

While residing in Waverly, West formed an insurance business with a brother, John West. Two years later he decided to seek greater opportunities in the insurance field in Suffolk, Virginia, where he joined the firm of Col. L. P. Harper. West soon became the junior partner in the firm of Harper and West. Upon the death of Harper in 1906 the firm became West and Withers, with Mr. J. T. Withers as junior partner.

On January 17, 1903, West married Margaret Olive Beale, a daughter of Rev. and Mrs. Edwin W. Beale of Suffolk. Soon after their marriage they purchased the residence then located at the east corner of West Washington Street and St. James Avenue where they lived for the remainder of his life. The Wests had one child, a daughter, Margaret Beale, who was born in 1909.

West devoted much of his life to public service. He became active in local politics and was elected to Suffolk City Council and served as president of that body in 1896. Claude A. Swanson, who served as Governor of Virginia from 1906 to 1910, named West to his staff and bestowed upon him the title of colonel by which he was known for the remainder of his life.

In 1910 West was elected to the Virginia House of Delegates and in 1912 to the Virginia State Senate, where he served for ten years. West became a leader in the Democratic Party at the state level. During his career West served on the Democratic State Central Committee and its executive committee as well as on several local Democratic executive committees. He was a delegate to the Democratic National Convention in 1896 and in 1936.

In 1922 and again in 1926 West was elected Lieutenant Governor of Virginia, serving during the terms of Governors E. Lee Trinkle and Harry Flood Byrd. During West's first term in office, Governor Trinkle appointed West's brother, Judge Jesse F. West of Sussex County, to a seat on the Virginia Supreme Court of Appeals. At his second inaugural ceremony in 1926, Judge West administered the oath of office to his brother, Junius West.

During the years in which West served as lieutenant governor, Richard L. Brewer, Jr. of Suffolk served as Speaker of the House of Delegates (from 1920 to 1926) and a third Suffolk citizen, Robert Riddick Prentis, served as Chief Justice of the State Supreme Court of Appeals (from 1925 to 1931). It has been said that "[t]he spotlight that played simultaneously on these three men during an important transition period in the state's history made Suffolk, for a time, a kind of "little capital" of Virginia and conferred upon [the three men] ... the unofficial title of "Suffolk's Big Three".

West was always active in civic affairs. In the early 20th century West was, for a time, an owner and publisher of the Suffolk Herald, a forerunner of the Suffolk News Herald. He was a charter member of the Suffolk Rotary Club and served as its president in 1924. West served as a director of the Retail Merchants Association and as a director and president of the Suffolk Chamber of Commerce. He was also on the board of directors of the State Chamber of Commerce. West was a Mason, serving as the Master of Lodge 30 in Suffolk in 1901. He was a member of the Sons of the American Revolution, a Shriner, a Knight Templar, a Pythian, an Elk, an Odd Fellow, a member of the Junior Order of American Mechanics, a member of the Laurel Country Club of Suffolk and of the Westmoreland Club of Richmond. Too old to enter military service in World War I, he served as the Chairman of the United War Work Campaign in Suffolk and Nansemond County.

West was a very active layman in the Suffolk Christian Church, chairing many committees, and serving on the board of deacons and the board of trustees. During the 1890s he organized a Sunday School Class which became the Philathea Class in 1913 and which he taught until his death in 1947. On April 17, 1950, the Young Ladies Bible Class and Senior Philathea Class became one and that class was renamed "The West Memorial Bible Class". On Sunday, September 17, 1950, a memorial service was held in the classroom at which time a portrait of West was presented to the class.

West was chairman of the mission board of the Southern Convention of the Christian Church and served on the board of trustees of Elon College for nearly half a century. His interest in education also lead to his appointment to the board of trustees of what is now Longwood College.

In recognition of his achievements West was selected for inclusion in a number of editions of Who's Who in America. Upon his retirement from political service in Richmond in 1930, the Norfolk Virginian-Pilot wrote: "Those who will miss him most are his associates in the Senate, men who day by day have been impressed with his fairness as a presiding officer, his uniform courtesy and his innate kindliness". On January 27, 1932, in the State Senate Chamber in Richmond, West was honored with a formal dedication of his portrait. Senator E. E. Holland, of Suffolk, made the formal presentation citing the high esteem in which West was held in Suffolk: "I can attest that in Suffolk he is considered a model citizen and is a leader in all religious, civic, social and political activities. He has been eminently successful, progressive yet conservative, and is always alert and ready to strive for the best interests of Virginia and her citizens". The portrait hangs in the Virginia State Capitol to this day.

West died on January 1, 1947, in a Richmond hospital where he was being treated for cancer. Louis Jaffe, the Pulitzer Prize-winning editor of the Norfolk Virginian Pilot, described West as a "conspicuous member of the General Assembly [who] ... in many ways as an almost ideal legislator ... No inconsiderable part of the most valuable legislation of that transitional period of Virginia history bore his name."

West drew the praise of several who had served as Governor of the Commonwealth. Harry Byrd described him as "an indefatigable worker ... [who] had a grasp of public matters such as few men of my acquaintance possessed ... [I]t can be very truthfully said of him that his labors in the public service of Virginia was outstanding". Colgate Darden wrote that West "has participated in every phase of civic life looking to the betterment of the State ... and through his efforts ... the people of Virginia have been enriched and encouraged". William M. Tuck described West "as one of Virginia's leading citizens" who "as a citizen and as an official ... contributed much that is of value to the life of our Commonwealth."

West was buried in Cedar Hill Cemetery in Suffolk on January 3, 1947.

Political offices
Preceded by Benjamin Franklin Buchanan	Lieutenant Governor of Virginia; 1922–1930	Succeeded by James H. Price
