= William Carrington Thompson =

American judge

W. Carrington Thompson

Justice of the Supreme Court of Virginia
- In office February 19, 1980 – March 2, 1983
- Preceded by: Alexander Harman
- Succeeded by: John C. Thomas

Member of the Virginia Senate from the 12th district
- In office January 10, 1968 – January 12, 1972 Serving with William F. Stone
- Preceded by: Landon R. Wyatt
- Succeeded by: Bill Parkerson

Member of the Virginia House of Delegates for Danville City and Pittsylvania
- In office January 13, 1960 – January 10, 1968
- Preceded by: Hunt M. Whitehead
- Succeeded by: George B. Anderson

Personal details
- Born: William Carrington Thompson; November 6, 1915 Chatham, Virginia, U.S.
- Died: June 11, 2011 (aged 95) Chatham, Virginia, U.S.
- Party: Democratic
- Education: University of Virginia (LLB)

Military service
- Allegiance: United States
- Branch/service: United States Navy
- Battles/wars: World War II

William Carrington Thompson (November 6, 1915 – June 11, 2011) was an American jurist and politician.

== Early life ==
Thompson was born in Chatham, Virginia. He attended Hampden-Sydney College and graduated in 1935. He received his law degree from the University of Virginia Law School in 1938 and was admitted to the bar the same year.

During World War II, Thompson served in the U.S. Navy, at various times patrolling the Eastern shore and in the Pacific Ocean.

== Legal and political career ==
Upon returning to civilian life, Thompson returned to his job as assistant attorney general, then was elected Commonwealth's Attorney for Pittsylvania County, Virginia, where he served from 1948 until 1955.

In 1959, Thompson won election to the House of Delegates, serving as a Democrat representing Danville and Pittsylvania County. He was elected to the Senate of Virginia in 1967, and served until 1972.

== Judicial career ==
The General Assembly elected him as judge for the Twenty-Second Judicial Circuit in 1973, and he heard cases in Danville as well as Franklin and Pittsylvania Counties.

After Justice Alexander Harman retired, the General Assembly elected Judge Thompson to the Supreme Court of Virginia, effective February 1, 1980. Justice Thompson retired from active service on the Court three years later and was succeeded by Justice John Charles Thomas.

== Death and legacy ==
Justice Thompson died at his home in Chatham on June 11, 2011.
