= Thomas C. Gordon =

American judge

Justice of the Supreme Court of Virginia
- In office February 17, 1965 – May 31, 1972
- Preceded by: Kennon C. Whittle
- Succeeded by: Richard H. Poff

Personal details
- Born: Thomas Christian Gordon Jr. July 14, 1915; Richmond, Virginia, U.S.
- Died: May 17, 2003 (aged 87)
- Education: University of Virginia

Military service
- Allegiance: United States
- Branch/service: United States Army
- Rank: Major
- Unit: Signal Corps
- Battles/wars: World War II

Thomas Christian Gordon Jr. (July 14, 1915 – May 17, 2003) was a justice of the Supreme Court of Virginia from 1965 to 1972.

== Biography ==
He was born in Richmond, Virginia. He attended the University of Virginia where he received his Bachelor of Arts degree in 1936 and his LL.B. in 1938.

For a number of years he was associated with the law firm of McGuire, Woods, King, Gordon and Davis. For 1963–64, he was President of the Virginia Bar Association. On February 17, 1965, he was sworn in as a justice of the Supreme Court of Appeals of Virginia, having been elected by the General Assembly. Justice Gordon resigned from the Court on May 31, 1972, and returned to private practice.
