= Henry W. Holt =

American judge (1864–1947)

18th Chief Justice of Virginia
- In office October 1, 1946 – October 4, 1947
- Preceded by: Preston W. Campbell
- Succeeded by: Edward W. Hudgins

Justice of the Supreme Court of Virginia
- In office June 1, 1928 – October 4, 1947
- Preceded by: Martin P. Burks
- Succeeded by: Willis D. Miller

Personal details
- Born: Henry Winston Holt; September 14, 1864 Wakefield, Virginia, U.S.
- Died: October 4, 1947 (aged 83) Augusta, Virginia, U.S.
- Resting place: Thornrose Cemetery
- Spouse: Mary Caperton Braxton
- Children: 5
- Relatives: Saxon W. Holt (brother)
- Education: Virginia Military Institute; Washington and Lee University (LLB)

Henry Winston Holt (September 14, 1864 – October 4, 1947) was an American judge from Virginia. He served as justice of the Supreme Court of Virginia from 1928 to his death in 1947.

== Early life ==
Henry W. Holt was born in Isle of Wight County to Virginia Henry and Micajah Quincy Holt. He was raised in Surry County, Virginia. His preparatory education was received at Hanover Academy in Hanover County, Virginia after which he attended Massachusetts Institute of Technology for two years and the Virginia Military Institute in 1886. He attended Virginia Military Institute in 1886 and then transferred to Washington and Lee University School of Law, graduating with a Bachelor of Laws in 1888. He was a member of Phi Beta Kappa.

== Career ==
After graduating, Holt practiced law in Wichita, Kansas. In 1888, he moved to Staunton, Virginia. In 1891, he was Commandant of Cadets at Staunton Military Academy. He served on the Corporation Court of Buena Vista from 1893 to 1896. He practiced law for four years and was named judge of the Corporation Court in Staunton around 1900. In 1912, he was appointed judge of the 18th Judicial Court of Virginia. He served in that role for 16 years.

In 1924, Judge Holt was elected to the Special Court of Appeals and, in 1928, to the Supreme Court of Appeals. Holt was appointed by Governor Harry F. Byrd to succeed Martin P. Burks as associate justice. In 1946, he succeeded Preston W. Campbell as chief justice of the Supreme Court of Appeals. He served in that role until his death.

== Personal life ==
Holt had five children, Mrs. George F. Rosenberger, H. Winston Jr., Virginia, Esta and Mrs. Rodney Washburn. His brother was Virginia lieutenant governor Saxon W. Holt.

Holt died following a heart attack on October 4, 1947, at his home in Staunton. He was buried in Thornrose Cemetery.

== Awards and legacy ==
In 1929, Holt received an honorary doctorate from Washington and Lee University.

The University of Virginia acquired his papers, along with those of his brother in law Allen Caperton Braxton.
