= Horace Blois Burnham =

American judge

Horace B. Burnham
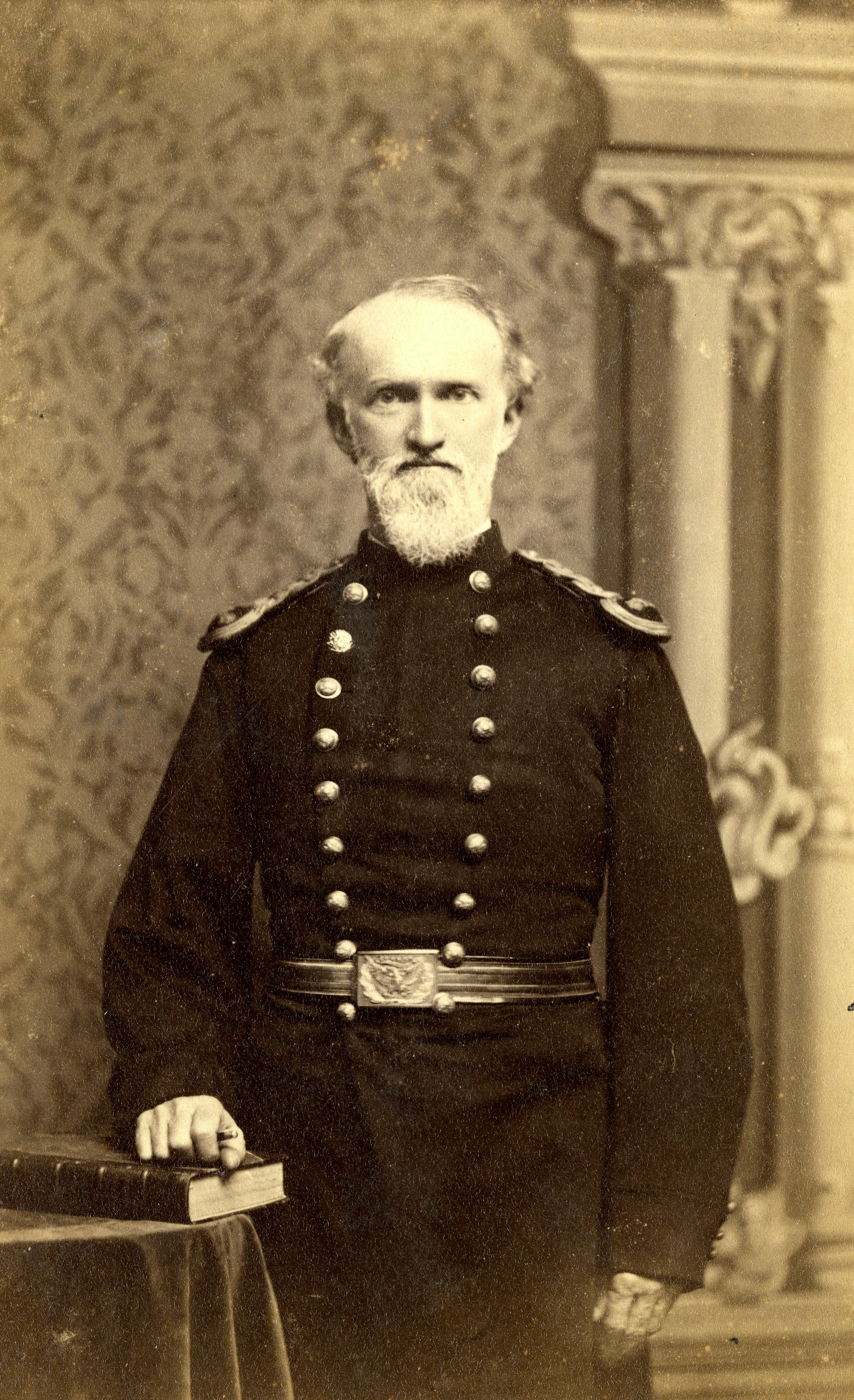

Justice of the Supreme Court of Virginia
- In office June 9, 1869 – February 22, 1870

Personal details
- Born: September 10, 1824 Spencertown, New York, U.S.
- Died: April 10, 1894 (aged 69) Aspen Shade, Henrico County, Virginia, US
- Party: Republican
- Spouse: Ruth Ann Jackson

Military service
- Allegiance: United States
- Branch/service: judge advocate general
- Years of service: 1861-1888
- Rank: lt. colonel
- Unit: 67th Pennsylvania Infantry
- Battles/wars: Second Battle of Winchester

Horace Blois Burnham (September 10, 1824 – April, 1894) was an American lawyer and career U.S. Army officer (primarily in the Judge Advocate General office), who briefly served as President of the Virginia Supreme Court during Congressional Reconstruction.

== Early and family life ==
Born in Spencertown, Columbia County, New York, on September 10, 1824, to Judson Williams Burnham and Mary Blois Burnham, Horace could trace his ancestry to a lawyer who emigrated from England in the 17th century. His parents moved their young family to Carbondale in northeastern Pennsylvania, where young Horace attended the public schools.

Burnham read law with Dwight N. Lathrop and was admitted to the Pennsylvania bar in Wilkes-Barre on August 12, 1844.

On February 22, 1846, he married Ruth Ann Jackson, with whom he a son Nathan slightly more than a year later, and two daughters (Mary and Anna). The Burnhams lived in Mauch Chunk (later Jim Thorpe), Carbon County, Pennsylvania, and H. B. Burnham practiced law for two decades until the outbreak of the American Civil War.

== American Civil War ==
Burnham recruited a 3-year volunteer infantry company, the 67th Pennsylvania, and received an officer's commission. His unit was assigned to Annapolis, Maryland, then Harpers Ferry, West Virginia, and Berryville, Virginia, guarding stores and keeping the peace. Many in the company were captured during the Second Battle of Winchester in 1863, although not Burnham. Later that year, his company helped suppress the draft riots in New York in 1863. Nonetheless, in December 1863, he resigned his infantry commission, and accepted one from the Judge Advocate General's office.

Burnham then served as one of the army's Judge Advocates for volunteers based at the Washington, D.C., headquarters (1863-1866). Burnham served in a combat position at the Battle of Monocacy. As a judge advocate, he conducted the courts-martial review of deserters in the Capitol. At the end of the war he was detailed to the Bureau of Military Justice in Washington, where he served for a year, until resigning from the volunteer corps and accepting a commission in the regular army in February 1867 (1866-1867).

== Virginia judicial career ==
After Virginia surrendered, it was not allowed to resume its place in the Union without adopting a new state Constitution which abolished slavery (illegal in rebellious states after the Emancipation Proclamation and in the United States after adoption of the 13th Amendment). A constitution adopted in the occupied portion of Virginia in 1864 had instituted popular election of judges, but also allowed the governor to make transitional appointments.

Also, after Congressional Reconstruction created Military District Number One in what had been Virginia, on April 18, 1867, Burnham (who had received a regular army commission in February) became that district's Chief Judge Advocate, serving under military governor Major General John Schofield. Another new federal law forbad former Confederates from holding state office, including as judges. Thus, in March General Schofield removed the judge of the lowest level (Hustings) court in Richmond, and on September 11, 1867, appointed Burnham in his place. On June 3, 1869, Gen. Schofield removed all three members of Virginia's Court of Appeals (R.C.L. Moncure, William T. Joynes and Alexander Rives).

On June 12, 1869, Gen. Schofield appointed Burnham as one of the three replacement judges (alongside Orloff M. Dorman and Westel Willoughby). However, Burnham refused to resign his federal military commission, which made him a flash point for controversy (Virginians had been sticklers about judges also not serving in the executive or legislative branch, much less federal office). Nonetheless, his two fellow judges elected him as their President, and they met briefly in June and again for a day in October. After voters approved the new Constitution and elected delegates to the Virginia General Assembly, at its first session legislators passed (and the governor signed) a law specifically forbidding U.S. Army officers from holding state office. Thus, Judge Burnham was removed on January 22, although his two colleagues sat for two additional days and issued opinions in February. On March 5, the General Assembly passed legislation validating the actions of the court during those months, including Burham's only written decision, a concurrence which concerned judicial jurisdiction over felonies (in that instance a murder in Northampton County) in the immediate postwar period. Otherwise, Judge Willoughby wrote six of the court's eight opinions (including that in the Wright case) and Judge Dorman wrote two.

The newly elected Virginia General Assembly also re-appointed two of the three judges previously on the Virginia Supreme Court, president R.C.L. Moncure and Joynes. The third member, Alexander Rives (a former Unionist, although 3 of his sons were Confederate officers and his brother a Confederate legislator) switched to the Republican party and ran for Congress. He lost to former Democrat turned Conservative Dukes, but was soon appointed to the federal bench of District Judge of the Western District of Virginia. The General Assembly also increased the court from 3 members to its normal 5 member complement, but elected neither Willoughby nor Dorman to those new seats.

== Additional army service ==
Since Burnham consistently refused to give up his U.S. Army commission, he was assigned as Judge Advocate, of the New Military Department of Virginia (1870), then as Judge Advocate of the Department of Texas (April 1872), and finally as Judge Advocate in the Department of the Platte (based in Omaha from November 1872 – 1886 (although reduced to deputy judge advocate, 1884-1886). In that year he was assigned to the Department of California and Military Division of the Pacific, and spent the final years of his career near San Francisco.

== Death and legacy ==
Upon resigning his commission, Burnham returned to Henrico County, Virginia, where he bought a former plantation known as Aspen Shades. There he died on April 10, 1894, of pneumonia. His body was interred at Arlington National Cemetery after a ceremony with full masonic honors.

His widow received his pension, and was buried beside him in 1907. Their daughter Annie Burnham Merriam (1854-1929) would also be buried at Arlington National Cemetery, but beside her husband Maj. Lewis Merriam in section W, site 39E. Her sister Mary married Professor Collins and lived in St. Louis. Their brother Nathan Jackson Burnham (1848-1898) also enlisted in the Pennsylvania infantry (197th in June but was mustered out in the fall), and became an attorney, but after admission to the Virginia bar in 1869, he moved to Washington, D.C., and graduated from National University (later George Washington University) in 1872, then moved west, marrying in Omaha, Nebraska and winning election as District Attorney in 1880.
