= John W. Eggleston =

American judge

20th Chief Justice of Virginia
- In office July 29, 1958 – October 1, 1969
- Preceded by: Edward W. Hudgins
- Succeeded by: Harold F. Snead

Justice of the Supreme Court of Virginia
- In office February 26, 1935 – October 1, 1969
- Preceded by: Louis S. Epes
- Succeeded by: Alexander M. Harman, Jr.

Member of the Virginia Senate from the 2nd district
- In office January 13, 1932 – February 26, 1935
- Preceded by: James S. Barron
- Succeeded by: Vivian L. Page

Personal details
- Born: John William Eggleston; June 18, 1886 Charlotte Court House, Virginia, U.S.
- Died: May 18, 1976 (aged 89) Norfolk, Virginia, U.S.
- Spouse: Ella Watkins Carrington
- Education: Hampden-Sydney College; Washington and Lee University

John William Eggleston (June 18, 1886 – May 18, 1976) was a Virginia lawyer, politician and jurist whose tenure by the time of his death was the longest in the century.

== Early and family life ==
Born at Charlotte Court House, Virginia, to David Q. Eggleston and his wife Sue Daniel, Eggleston attended Hampden-Sydney College from 1902 to 1904, then Washington and Lee University, from which he received a B.A. degree in 1906, an M.A. in 1907, and LL.B. degree in 1910. He was a member of Omicron Delta Kappa, Order of the Coif, Phi Beta Kappa, and Phi Delta Phi. His elder brother David Quinn Eggleston (1893–1978) remained in Charlotte County and later represented it in the Virginia General Assembly. In 1949, Washington and Lee awarded Justice John Eggleston an honorary LL. D. degree.

He married Ella Watkins Carrington (1889–1983), daughter of John Cullen Carrington, and had daughters Mary Elfreth Moore and Eleanor Carrington Eggleston.

== Career ==
Eggleston was admitted to the Virginia bar and began practicing law with his partner Baker at Norfolk, Virginia in 1910. By 1920 his younger brother B. Purnell Eggleston, who was a foreman at the Norfolk Navy Yard, also lived with the family.

John Eggleston was elected to the Virginia State Senate (a part-time position) to represent Norfolk, in 1931, and served from 1932 until 1935. He was a member of the commission that revised the state's alcohol control laws.

Governor George C. Peery nominated Eggleston to the Supreme Court of Appeals, and fellow legislators elected him to that position in 1935. In 1958, Eggleston became chief justice and served in that position until he retired on September 30, 1969, and was replaced as justice by former state senator George M. Cochran of Staunton, Virginia and as Chief Justice by Harold Fleming Snead, who ironically had been one of only two dissenters from one of Eggleston's most important opinions as discussed below.

Although Eggleston firmly believed in states' rights, he became best known for the opinions he wrote overturning attempts by Virginia legislators to avoid complying with the United States Supreme Court's decisions in Brown v. Board of Education (which had a companion case Davis v. County School Board of Prince Edward County). The Massive Resistance crisis had embroiled Virginia, with U.S. Senator Harry F. Byrd vowing to make his state a bastion against enforcement of Brown. Justice Eggleston wrote the 1955 decision which interpreted a state constitutional provision such that Virginia could not pay private school tuitions for students who left public schools because they integrated racially. In response, legislators proposed a state constitutional amendment, which voters approved the following January, then the special legislative session of August and September 1956 adopted the Stanley Plan which included such tuition grants. The school voucher issue then came before the Court again as Harrison v. Day, a declaratory judgment action brought by the Virginia attorney general against the state's comptroller. Chief Justice Eggleston's opinion of January 19, 1959 (birthday of Robert E. Lee and a state holiday in Virginia), while criticizing the federal decision, also declared the new Virginia laws unconstitutional. Only the two justices from Richmond refused to make the decision unanimous, Harold Fleming Snead joining in the dissent of Willis D. Miller, although a three-judge federal panel on the same day also overturned the Stanley Plan as unconstitutional under the U.S. Constitution in James v. Almond. School desegregation came before the Virginia Supreme Court again in 1963, and Chief Justice Eggleston strongly dissented from the six-justice majority in December 1963, correctly predicting that the U.S. Supreme Court would overturn their approval of funds for Prince Edward County's segregation academies while its public schools remained closed, Griffin v. County School Board of Prince Edward County. Another important opinion was United States Construction Workers v. Laburnum Construction Corp. (1953), which established the authority of state courts to adjudicate suits by corporations against labor unions over unfair business practices. In one of his last of more than 500 opinions, Eggleston wrote a unanimous decision about a prisoner (Robert Lee Clark) being improperly denied his right to appeal.

== Death and legacy ==
Eggleston died at the Norfolk General Hospital on May 18, 1976. He is buried in Norfolk. Since 1999, the Norfolk and Portsmouth Bar Association has named its professionalism award after Norfolk native Eggleston, as well as fellow justice Lawrence W. L'Anson of Portsmouth. His great-grandson is Perry Moore, executive producer of The Chronicles of Narnia film series and New York Times Bestselling Author of the novel, Hero.

Senate of Virginia
Preceded by James S. Barron	Virginia Senator for the 2nd District; 1932–1935; Served alongside: John A. Lesner	Succeeded by Vivian L. Page
