= Roscoe B. Stephenson Jr. =

American judge

Justice of the Supreme Court of Virginia
- In office March 2, 1981 – July 1, 1997
- Preceded by: Lawrence W. I'Anson
- Succeeded by: Cynthia D. Kinser

Personal details
- Born: Roscoe Bolar Stephenson Jr. February 22, 1922 Covington, Virginia, U.S.
- Died: May 30, 2011 (aged 89) Covington, Virginia, U.S.
- Education: Washington & Lee University

Roscoe Bolar Stephenson Jr. (February 22, 1922 – May 30, 2011) was an American jurist from Virginia. He was born at Covington, Virginia. He attended the public schools of Alleghany County, Virginia, and received both his B.A. (1943) and his J.D. (1947) from Washington and Lee University. After being admitted to the bar in 1947, he practiced law in Covington for twenty-six years. From 1952 to 1964, he served as Commonwealth's Attorney for Alleghany County. On July 12, 1973, he was elected as a judge for the Twenty-Fifth Judicial Circuit. He stayed in that position until he was elected to the Supreme Court of Virginia in February 1981. Justice Stephenson retired from active service in 1997, but continued his service to the Court as a Senior Justice until mid-2010. Justice Stephenson died on May 30, 2011, in Covington, Virginia.
