= Lawrence W. I'Anson =

American judge

22nd Chief Justice of Virginia
- In office October 1, 1974 – January 31, 1981
- Preceded by: Harold F. Snead
- Succeeded by: Harry L. Carrico

Justice of the Supreme Court of Virginia
- In office September 3, 1958 – January 31, 1981
- Appointed by: J. Lindsay Almond
- Preceded by: Edward W. Hudgins
- Succeeded by: Roscoe B. Stephenson, Jr.

Personal details
- Born: Lawrence Warren I'Anson; April 21, 1907 Portsmouth, Virginia, U.S.
- Died: December 17, 1990 (aged 83) Portsmouth, Virginia, U.S.
- Spouse: May Frances Tuttle
- Education: College of William & Mary; University of Virginia

Lawrence Warren I’Anson (April 21, 1907 – December 17, 1990) was a Virginia lawyer, prosecutor and judge. He was elected as a justice of the Supreme Court of Virginia and served as chief justice from 1974 to 1981.

== Career ==
I'Anson received his Bachelor of Arts degree from the College of William and Mary in 1928 and his LL.B. at the University of Virginia in 1931. Admitted to the bar in 1931, he began practice in Portsmouth the same year. From 1938 to 1941, he was Commonwealth’s Attorney for the city of Portsmouth and, in 1941, became judge of the Hustings Court there. Judge I’Anson remained in that position until he was appointed to the Supreme Court of Appeals in 1958.

While serving as a Supreme Court judge, I'Anson led the Virginia Court System Study Commission whose 1971 recommendations resulted in wholesale reform of the state courts system.

When Chief Justice Harold Snead retired in 1974, Justice I’Anson became Chief Justice of the Court where he remained until his own retirement on January 31, 1981. He died December 17, 1990.

== Awards ==
Justice I’Anson received an honorary LL. D. from William and Mary in 1964. He was a member of Order of the Coif, Phi Beta Kappa, Phi Alpha Delta, Phi Kappa Alpha and Omicron Delta Kappa. He was the Director of the American Judicature Society, Chairman of the National Conference of’ Chief Justices, member of the Board of Directors of the National Center for State Courts. Justice I’Anson also received the University of Virginia Sesquicentennial Award in 1969 and the American Judicature Society’s Lincoln Harley Award in 1973.

== Legacy ==
The I'Anson-Hoffman American Inn of Court was established under I'Anson's leadership in 1987 to promote the goals of legal excellence, civility, professionalism and ethics.

The Lawrence W. I'Anson Award is presented annually by the William & Mary Law School in his honor.
