= Richard H. Poff =

American judge (1923–2011)

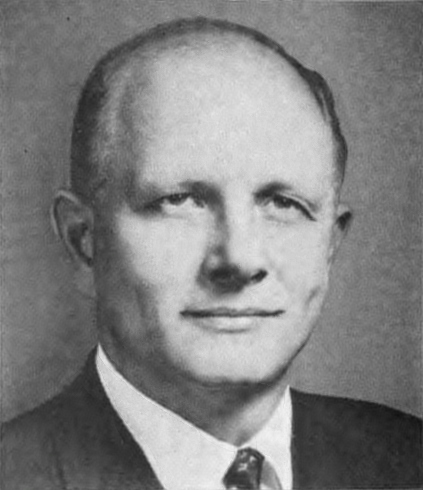

Justice of the Virginia Supreme Court
- In office August 31, 1972 – December 31, 1988
- Appointed by: Linwood Holton
- Preceded by: Thomas Gordon
- Succeeded by: Elizabeth Lacy

Member of the U.S. House of Representatives from Virginia's 6th district
- In office January 3, 1953 – August 29, 1972
- Preceded by: Clarence Burton
- Succeeded by: Caldwell Butler

Personal details
- Born: October 19, 1923 Radford, Virginia, U.S.
- Died: June 27, 2011 (aged 87) Tullahoma, Tennessee, U.S.
- Party: Republican
- Spouses: Jo Ann Topper (m. 1948; died 1978) Jean Murphy (m. 1980; died 2007)
- Children: 3
- Education: Roanoke College (BA); University of Virginia, Charlottesville (LLB)

Military service
- Allegiance: United States
- Branch/service: United States Army
- Years of service: 1943–1945
- Rank: First lieutenant
- Unit: U.S. Army Air Forces • Eighth Air Force
- Battles/wars: World War II
- Awards: Distinguished Flying Cross

Richard Harding "Dick" Poff (October 19, 1923 – June 27, 2011) was an American politician and judge. He was first elected to the United States House of Representatives in 1952 from Virginia's 6th congressional district. An attorney and a Republican, he was given strong consideration for the United States Supreme Court by President Richard M. Nixon and was later appointed as a justice (later senior justice) of the Virginia Supreme Court.

== Early life and education ==
Born in Radford, Montgomery County, Virginia, Poff attended the local public schools and graduated from Christiansburg High School. He then traveled to Salem, Virginia for studies at Roanoke College. After his military service below, Poff used his GI bill benefits, he earned a law degree (LL.B.) in 1948 from the University of Virginia School of Law at Charlottesville.

== Military service ==
During the Second World War, Poff served as a bomber pilot with the Eighth Air Force in England; flew thirty-five successful missions over Europe; awarded the Distinguished Flying Cross; was inactivated from the service as a first lieutenant serving from February 1943 to August 1945.

== Legislative career ==
Poff was first elected to Congress in 1952, defeating incumbent Democrat Clarence G. Burton. He was the first Republican to represent this part of Virginia since Reconstruction, and likely owed his victory to Dwight Eisenhower carrying the state in that year's presidential election. However, the 6th district had been shifting away from its Democratic roots for some time. The Byrd Democrats in western Virginia and the Shenandoah Valley had begun splitting their tickets as early as the 1930s. He would never face another contest nearly as close as his first one, and was reelected nine times.

Poff had his share of controversy during his decades in the House of Representatives. He and Joel Broyhill of Virginia were the only two Republicans, along with the rest of Virginia's entire Congressional delegation, and nearly all members from Southern states, to sign the Southern Manifesto protesting the Supreme Court's mandate in Brown v. Board of Education to desegregate public schools. Linwood Holton, former Governor of Virginia (1970–1974), and the Commonwealth's first post-Reconstruction Republican Governor, suggests that Poff likely could not have been reelected unless he had signed the manifesto. Despite that controversial decision, he was well liked by most of his constituents, most of whom had never been represented by a Republican before. This included many African Americans, who in an ABC News report on his nomination to the U.S. Supreme Court described him as having a great interest in individuals; only one person in that report described him as a racist despite having signed the Southern Manifesto. Consistent with his signing of the Manifesto, Poff voted against the Civil Rights Acts of 1957, 1960, 1964, and 1968, and the Voting Rights Act of 1965, but voted in favor of the 24th Amendment to the U.S. Constitution. In 1971, he voted for the Equal Employment Opportunity Act and supported federal aid to accelerate the desegregation process. He was the only member of the House Republican leadership who did not support President Eisenhower's proposal to increase the minimum wage and widen its coverage. According to John Dean, he was also the author of most of the Twenty-fifth Amendment to the United States Constitution while serving on the Judiciary Committee of the U.S. House of Representatives.

=== Electoral history ===
- 1952; Poff was elected to the U.S. House of Representatives with 51.55% of the vote, defeating Democrat Clarence Godber Burton.
- 1954; Poff was re-elected with 62.31% of the vote, defeating Democrat Ernest Robertson and Social Democrat J.B. Brayman.
- 1956; Poff was re-elected with 62.09% of the vote, defeating Democrat John L. Whitehead and Social Democrat Brayman.
- 1958; Poff was re-elected with 56.74% of the vote, defeating Democrat Richard F. Pence and Social Democrat Brayman.
- 1960; Poff was re-elected with 82.62% of the vote, defeating Social Democrat Brayman.
- 1962; Poff was re-elected with 65.22% of the vote, defeating Democrat John P. Wheeler and now-Independent Brayman.
- 1964; Poff was re-elected with 56.24% of the vote, defeating Democrat William B. Hopkins.
- 1966; Poff was re-elected with 80.84% of the vote, defeating Democrat Murray A. Stoller.
- 1968; Poff was re-elected with 92.16% of the vote, defeating Democrat Tom Hufford.
- 1970; Poff was re-elected with 74.58% of the vote, defeating Democrat Roy R. White.

== Nomination to Supreme Court of the United States ==
Before President Richard Nixon could formally nominate him for the U.S. Supreme Court, Poff withdrew (before nomination reached the Senate). John Dean wrote that Poff actually made that decision based on concerns that he would thus be forced to reveal to his then-12-year-old son that he had been adopted. Poff's concern was that the child would be negatively affected by that kind of information if revealed before he was old enough to understand. Nevertheless, according to The New York Times, within weeks after he withdrew from consideration that sensitive personal information was revealed in Jack Anderson's column, and he was forced to inform the child of his adoption anyway. By then, it was too late for reconsideration, and eventually Lewis Powell, another Virginian, was confirmed to the Supreme Court in Poff's place.

In 1971, when under consideration for the Supreme Court, Poff said in a newspaper interview that he had supported the Southern Manifesto and opposed desegregation because he believed he would have otherwise been defeated for reelection to the U.S. House. He voiced regret over his opposition to past civil rights measures. Within a year of those comments, he resigned from the House to join the Virginia Supreme Court.

== Legislation ==
Poff is also well known as one of the men who, as a member of the House Judiciary Committee, sponsored the Racketeer Influenced and Corrupt Organizations Act, better known as RICO. Poff had an interesting take on RICO, which has since been ignored by the Supreme Court. Poff stated in the Congressional Record that the Act should be used only against organizations, and not individuals.

== Supreme Court of Virginia ==
Richard H. Poff went on to become Justice and then a Senior Justice of the Virginia Supreme Court, where he served until his retirement.

He died on June 27, 2011, in a life care center in Tullahoma, Tennessee.

== Personal life ==
Poff married his first wife, Jo Ann Topper, in 1948. She died in 1978. They had three children. In 1980, he married his second wife, Jean Murphy, who died in 2007.

== Legacy ==
The Richard H. Poff Federal Building in Roanoke, Virginia is named for Poff. It houses many of the primary federal offices in southwest Virginia, including the U.S. District Court for the Western District of Virginia and the Department of Veterans Affairs. The Roanoke Public Library maintains a collection of newsletters Congressman Poff sent to his constituents (1954-1971).

== External sources ==
- "Congressman Poff Speaks to Students During Independence Day Observance". Grapurchat Vol XXXIII Nbr 18. Radford College, Woman's Division of V.P.I. 1954-07-09. p. 1. Archived from the original (jpg) on 2007-11-27.

U.S. House of Representatives
Preceded by Clarence Burton	Member of the U.S. House of Representatives from Virginia's 6th congressional district 1953–1972	Succeeded by Caldwell Butler
Party political offices
Preceded by Everett Dirksen; Gerald Ford	Response to the State of the Union address 1968; Served alongside: Howard Baker, George H. W. Bush, Peter Dominick, Gerald Ford, Robert Griffin, Thomas Kuchel, Mel Laird, Bob Mathias, George Murphy, Chuck Percy, Al Quie, Charlotte Reid, Hugh Scott, Bill Steiger, John Tower	Vacant Title next held by Donald Fraser, Scoop Jackson, Mike Mansfield, John McCormack, Patsy Mink, Ed Muskie, Bill Proxmire
Legal offices
Preceded by Thomas Gordon	Justice of the Virginia Supreme Court; 1972–1988	Succeeded by Elizabeth Lacy
