= Abram Penn Staples =

American judge

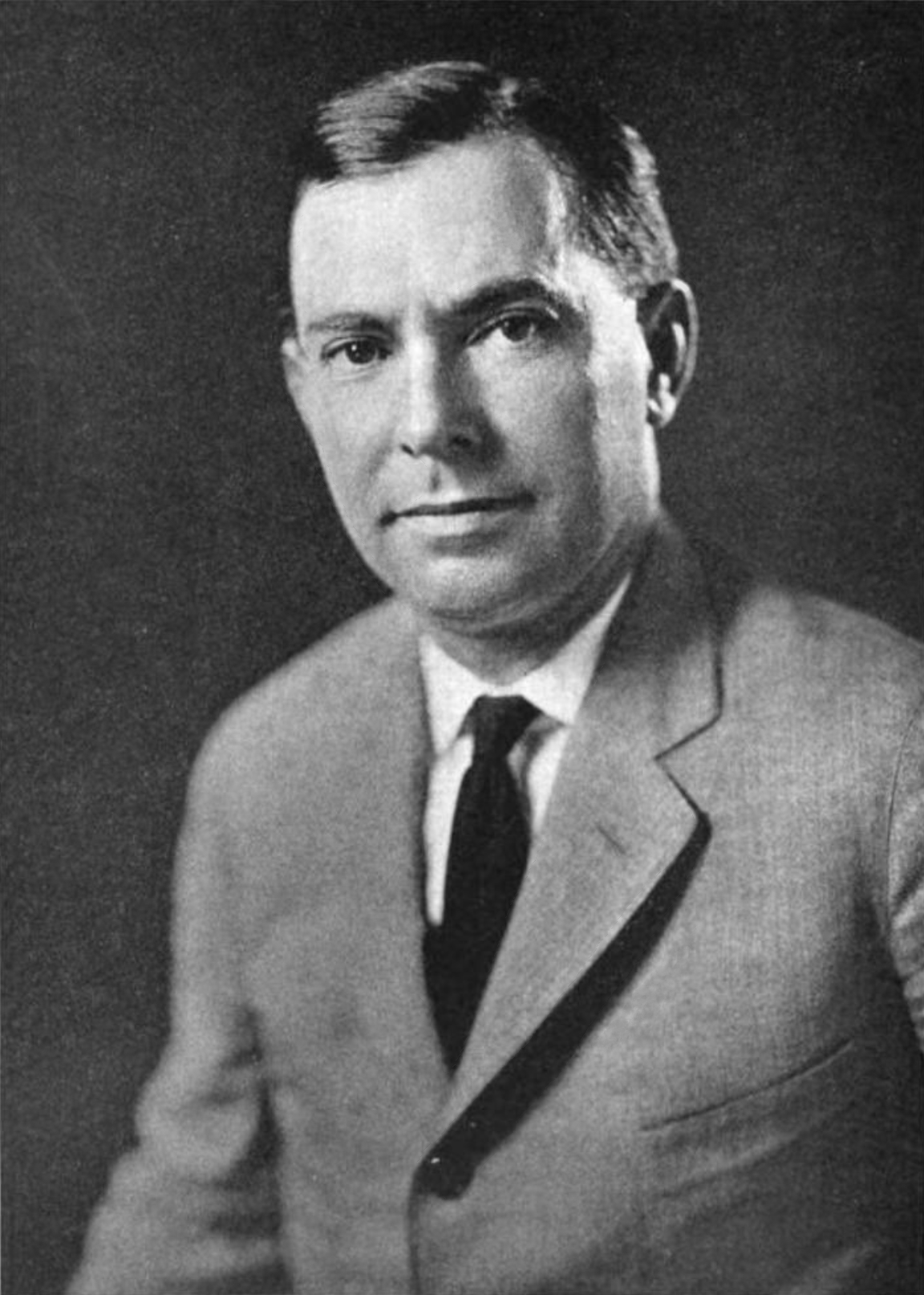
- Staples, c. 1924

Justice of the Supreme Court of Virginia
- In office October 7, 1947 – January 15, 1951
- Preceded by: George L. Browning
- Succeeded by: Lemuel F. Smith

24th Attorney General of Virginia
- In office March 22, 1934 – October 7, 1947
- Governor: George C. Peery; James H. Price; Colgate Darden; William M. Tuck
- Preceded by: John R. Saunders
- Succeeded by: Harvey B. Apperson

Member of the Virginia Senate from the 21st district
- In office January 11, 1928 – March 22, 1934
- Preceded by: R. Holman Willis
- Succeeded by: Harvey B. Apperson

Personal details
- Born: Abram Penn Staples; September 18, 1885 Martinsville, Virginia, U.S.
- Died: March 21, 1951 (aged 65) Richmond, Virginia, U.S.
- Party: Democratic
- Spouse: Jean Duncan Watts
- Education: Washington & Lee University
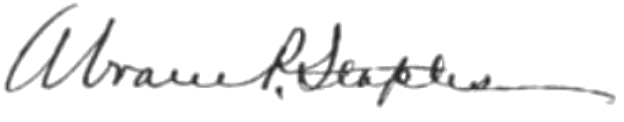
- Signature

Abram Penn Staples (September 18, 1885 – March 21, 1951) was a Virginia lawyer, legislator and jurist. He served for eleven years as the Attorney General of Virginia, and four years as a justice on the Supreme Court of Virginia.

== Early and family life ==
Staples was born at Martinsville, Virginia in 1885 to Abram Penn Staples (1858–1913), a prominent Virginia lawyer and his wife. His grandfather, Samuel Granville Staples, was the elected clerk of the Circuit Court of Patrick County, Virginia and had signed the Articles of Secession in 1861. His uncle, Waller Redd Staples sat of the Virginia Court of Appeals from 1870 to 1881 and for three of those years also on the faculty of the Washington and Lee University School of Law. When young Abram was a child, his family moved to Roanoke, where he attended Roanoke High School. In 1904, because of poor health (and to facilitate his children's education), Abram Staples Sr. joined the Washington and Lee University law faculty, where he became a beloved law professor until his death in a Roanoke hospital in 1913. Meanwhile, this Abram Staples studied as an undergraduate at Washington and Lee University, and received a Bachelor of Law degree in 1908.

== Career ==
Entering into practice at Roanoke in 1908, Staples soon made a name for himself as an exceptional lawyer. In 1924, he was elected President of the Roanoke Bar Association and, in 1927, was elected to the Virginia Senate (a part-time position), and was re-elected in 1931.

He was appointed Attorney General of Virginia in March 1934 to fill out the term of John R. Saunders (who had died in office). He won election to that office in 1937 against Republican Gerould M. Rumble. He was reelected in 1941 and 1945.

In August 1947, the Virginia General Assembly elected Staples to the Supreme Court of Appeals of Virginia. He served on that court until he retired in January 1951, because of failing health. Staples was a member of Phi Beta Kappa, Phi Delta Phi, and Omicron Delta Kappa.

Senate of Virginia
Preceded by R. Holman Willis	Virginia Senator for the 21st District; 1928–1934	Succeeded by Harvey B. Apperson
Legal offices
Preceded by John R. Saunders	Attorney General of Virginia; 1934–1947	Succeeded by Harvey B. Apperson
Preceded by George L. Browning	Justice of the Supreme Court of Virginia; 1947–1951	Succeeded by Lemuel F. Smith
