= Waller Redd Staples =

American judge

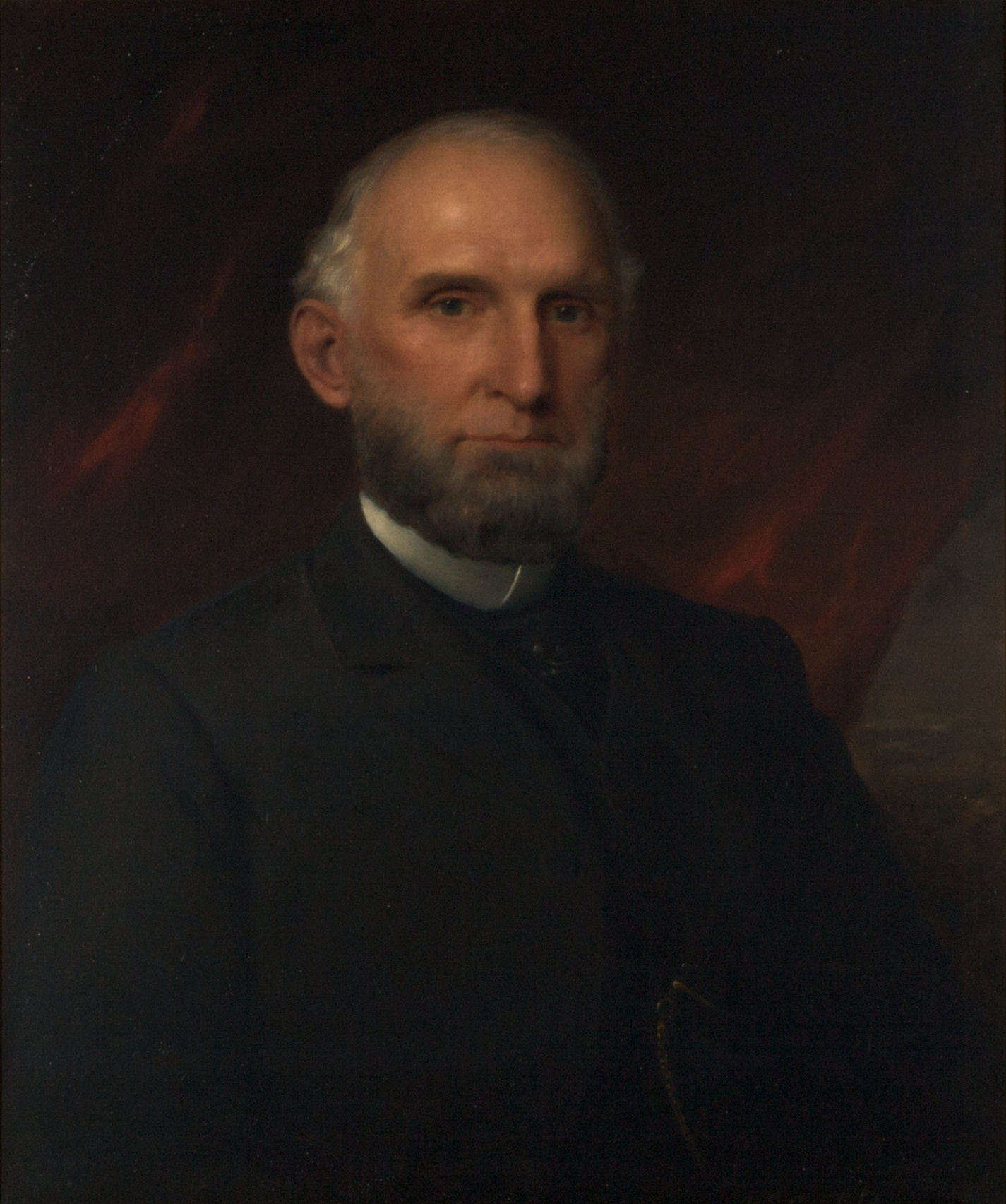
- Oil on canvas portrait of Justice Staples

Justice of the Supreme Court of Virginia
- In office January 1, 1871 – January 1, 1883

Member of the Confederate Congress from Virginia's 12th district
- In office 1862 – March 2, 1865
- Succeeded by: Position abolished

Member of the Virginia House of Delegates from Montgomery County
- In office 1854 – 1855

Personal details
- Born: February 24, 1826 Patrick County, Virginia, U.S.
- Died: August 21, 1897 (aged 71) Christiansburg, Virginia, U.S.
- Education: University of North Carolina; College of William and Mary

Waller Redd Staples (February 24, 1826 – August 21, 1897) was an American lawyer, law professor, judge, slave-owner and politician who was briefly a member of the Virginia General Assembly before the American Civil War, became a Congressman serving the Confederate States of America during the war, and after receiving a pardon at the war's end became a judge of the Virginia Court of Appeals, and law professor at Washington and Lee University, as well as revisor of Virginia's laws (1884-1887).

== Early and family life ==
Staples was born in Patrick County, Virginia to Col. Abram Penn Staples and his wife, the former Mary Stovall Penn. His paternal grandfather Samuel G. Staples and his maternal grandfather Abram Penn had served as soldiers in the American Revolutionary War, the former leading militia from Buckingham County, Virginia including at the Battle of Yorktown, and the latter leading militia from Henry County. His father was the clerk for Patrick County, as had been his grandfather, Keziah Staples. His elder brother Samuel Granville Staples (1821-1895) would remain in Patrick County and run a plantation before the war, and like his father become a delegate and like his younger brother a judge. The Staples sons received a private education, then Waller Staples attended the University of North Carolina for two years, before moving to Williamsburg to study at the College of William and Mary and graduated in 1845, then began reading law under the guidance of judge Norbonne Taliaferro in Franklin County.

Staples was active in the Presbyterian Church, but either never married, or if he did marry, his wife died between censuses.

== Career ==
After graduation and admission to the Virginia bar, Staples moved to the mountains of Montgomery County, Virginia to begin his private legal practice in its county seat, Christiansburg, as well as adjacent counties. He lived with and worked under the guidance of William Ballard Preston, who had served as Secretary of the Navy during the administration of President Zachary Taylor and was a cousin of his mother. Staples later noted that he never received a fee greater than $2000 until after 1883, when he began representing greater interests in private practice (after being removed from the Virginia Court of Appeals along with all his colleagues in a massive legislative reorganization0.

Meanwhile, in 1854–1855, Staples represented Montgomery County in the Virginia House of Delegates as a Whig. He then ran for the United States House of Representatives in the 12th district as a Know Nothing, but lost to the Democratic incumbent, Henry A. Edmundson. By 1860, Staples lived in a Christiansburg hotel owned by Thomas Wilson, as did several other lawyers and male professionals with less wealth than he. In that census, Staples owned 41 slaves in Montgomery County, of whom three lived at his Christiansburg residence and the remainder lived and worked further out in the county.

However, he opposed secession until Virginia voters accepted the recommendation of the Virginia Secession Convention of 1861. Then he paid to outfit the "New River Grays", a militia unit led by Dr. James Preston Hammett (a VMI graduate who later studied medicine in Philadelphia), which was mustered into the Confederate Army as Company H of the 24th Virginia Infantry.

=== Confederate legislator ===
After Virginia's secession from the Union and acceptance into the Confederate States, Staples was named one of Virginia's four delegates to the Provisional Confederate States Congress on February 22, 1862, alongside William C. Rives, R. M. T. Hunter and John W. Brockenbrough. The next year, he was elected to the First and Second Confederate Congresses, serving in the Confederate House of Representatives from 1862 to the end of the war. His brother Samuel G. Staples volunteered for the Confederate States Army and served as an aide to General J.E.B. Stuart; his relatives James S. Redd and Spottswood Redd were also captains. Waller Staples appears to have served in Wade's local defense regiment for Washington and Wythe Counties, Virginia, and became a critic of President Jefferson Davis by war's end.

=== Postwar judicial and legal career ===
Months after the Confederacy conceded defeat, Staples signed documentation that he would never again own any slaves, as well as assurances of future loyalty to the Union, and received a federal pardon from President Andrew Johnson on November 3, 1865. He then resumed his law practice in Montgomery County. However, his financial condition had substantially declined, so that at age 43 in 1870, Staples only owned about $10,000 in real estate and $5,000 in personal property.

In February, 1870, months after Virginia voters rejected a proposed constitutional provision making former high Confederate officeholders ineligible to hold public office (but did approve the constitution which allowed its readmission to the Union), the newly elected and reassembled Virginia General Assembly elected Staples to the Supreme Court of Appeals for a twelve-year term. He received the second highest number of votes other than that for long-term Judge Richard C. L. Moncure. While an appellate judge, Staples served as a member of Washington and Lee University School of Law's faculty, from 1877 to 1878. His most famous decisions on the court may have actually been his dissents concerning the legality of the Funding Act of 1871.

By the time the terms of all the Court of Appeals' judges expired 1882 (despite a controversy over the term length of a judge appointed to replace a deceased jurist), the Readjuster Party with which Staples sympathized controlled the state legislature. However, none of the judges on the Court of Appeals were re-elected. Nonetheless, the new Readjuster-leaning justices would later adopt what had been Staples' dissents in the state bond coupon cases. Thus, Staples returned to private practice, in partnership with Beverly Munford in Richmond, the firm being named as Staples & Munford. The state of Virginia also hired Staples to argue the Coupon cases in the U.S. Supreme Court, assisting Virginia Attorney General James G. Field in Antoni v. Greenhow and Stewart v. Virginia (1885). Staples was also a Democratic elector in the U.S. Presidential election of 1884, but refused to run for Governor nor Attorney General.

Beginning in 1884, Staples was also one of the revisors 1887 Code of Virginia, along Edward C. Burks and John W. Riely, both of whom had also served as Justices on the Supreme Court of Appeals of Virginia before the 1883 reorganization. In 1893-94, Staples became president of the Virginia Bar Association. Perhaps his most lucrative client was the Richmond and Danville Railroad.

In one of his more celebrated losses as a lawyer, Staples represented the administrators of the estate of a wealthy white man from Pittsylvania County named Thomas estranged from his relatives after he acknowledged his daughters from a relationship with one of his former slaves, lived with those daughters, and repeatedly and on his deathbed in 1889 announced his intention to make the sole surviving daughter his only heir, but who died before actually executing a will. The Richmond Chancery Court—and later the Virginia Supreme Court in an opinion announced by Judge Thomas T. Fauntleroy over a dissent by Judge Benjamin W. Lacy—rejected the arguments made by Staples and his three co-counsel in favor of those made by his former colleague Burks and Republican leader Edgar Allan and their co-counsel, making Bettie Lewis and her husband wealthy, although they soon moved to Philadelphia.

Governor Fitzhugh Lee appointed Staples to the board of visitors of Virginia Agricultural and Mechanical College in Blacksburg on January 1, 1886, and his fellow members elected him rector (the university's highest position) on January 23, 1886, although Staples died about a year later.

== Death and legacy ==
Staples may have become an invalid before he died in Christianburg in 1897. He is buried in Roanoke's Evergreen Cemetery.

The Virginia bar published memorials concerning his legal acumen and service to the state and bar, cited above. His nephew Abram Penn Staples Sr. of Roanoke served on the Washington and Lee University law faculty, and that man's son Abram Penn Staples Jr. would later like this Judge Staples serve on the Virginia Court of Appeals. Some of the Staples family papers, including references to an invalid uncle Judge by Daniel Staples, are now held by the University of Virginia library.
