= Louis S. Epes =

American judge

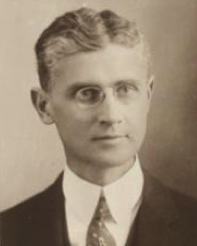

Justice of the Supreme Court of Virginia
- In office November 20, 1929 – February 14, 1935
- Preceded by: Jesse F. West
- Succeeded by: John W. Eggleston

Member of the Virginia State Corporation Commission
- In office November 16, 1925 – November 16, 1929
- Preceded by: William F. Rhea
- Succeeded by: George C. Peery

Member of the Virginia Senate from the 9th district
- In office January 9, 1924 – November 1925
- Preceded by: F. Percy Loth
- Succeeded by: Edwin L. Kendig

Member of the Virginia Senate from the 28th district
- In office January 14, 1920 – January 9, 1924
- Preceded by: George E. Allen
- Succeeded by: W. Worth Smith, Jr.

Personal details
- Born: Louis Spencer Epes; January 12, 1882 Prince William, Virginia, U.S.
- Died: February 14, 1935 (aged 53) Richmond, Virginia, U.S.
- Spouse: Julia Pegram Bagley
- Education: Hampden-Sydney College; Washington & Lee University

Louis Spencer Epes (January 12, 1882 – February 14, 1935) was an American lawyer, judge and politician. He served as a member of the Senate of Virginia and was appointed as a justice of the Supreme Court of Virginia.

== Early life and education ==
Epes was born in Prince William County, Virginia. His father Rev. Theodorick Epes was a Presbyterian minister whose family had owned the "Windrow" plantation in Nottoway County since the late 1839s. He was educated in public schools in Nottoway (possibly the Fernhill school of his aunt Fannie Harris Epes) and at Hoge Military Academy in Blackstone before he entered Hampden-Sydney College in 1898. After graduating in 1901, Epes taught at Horner Military Academy in Oxford, North Carolina (1901-1903); West Kentucky College, Mayfield, Kentucky (1903-1904), and conducted a private collegiate preparatory school in Helena, Arkansas (1904-1906). In 1906, he entered Washington and Lee University’s Law School, was admitted to the bar in 1907 and received his law degree in 1908. During 1907-1908, he practiced law in Lexington while completing his law course.

== Career ==
In 1908, he entered the firm of Epes and Epes at Blackstone and he practiced there until being appointed to the Virginia State Corporation Commission in November 1925. From 1911 to 1918, he was Mayor of Blackstone, resigning in 1918 to enter the United States Army, from which he was honorably discharged on December 5, 1918. In 1919, he was elected to the Virginia State Senate from Nottoway, Lunenburg, Prince Edward, Cumberland and Amelia Counties and served two terms. Epes served on the State Corporation Commission from November 1925 to November 1929, when the governor appointed him to the Supreme Court of Appeals of Virginia. He remained on the bench until his death.

== Sources ==
- Virginia State Bar Association Proceedings (1936), 171-175.
