= George M. Cochran =

American judge

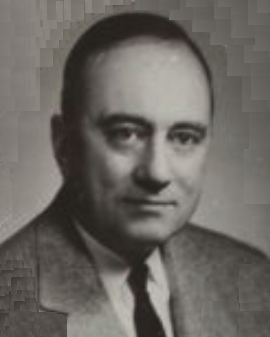

Justice of the Supreme Court of Virginia
- In office October 1, 1969 – April 20, 1987
- Preceded by: John W. Eggleston

Member of the Virginia Senate from the 19th district
- In office January 12, 1966 – 1968
- Preceded by: Curry Carter
- Succeeded by: H. Dunlop Dawbarn

Member of the Virginia House of Delegates from the 10th or Staunton district
- In office 1948–1965

Personal details
- Born: April 20, 1912 Staunton, Virginia, U.S.
- Died: January 22, 2011 (aged 98) Staunton, Virginia, U.S.
- Party: Democratic
- Spouse: Marion Lee Stuart
- Children: Stuart Cochran, G. Moffett Cochran
- Education: University of Virginia (BA); University of Virginia Law School (LLB)
- Profession: Lawyer

Military service
- Branch/service: U.S. Navy
- Years of service: 1942–1946
- Rank: Lieutenant Commander

George Moffett Cochran IV (April 20, 1912 – January 22, 2011) was a Virginia lawyer, banker and legislator who later served as a justice of the Virginia Supreme Court. Cochran served part-time representing Staunton, Virginia in the Virginia General Assembly for nearly two decades, first as a delegate, then briefly as state senator. His opposition to the Byrd Organization's policy of Massive Resistance helped integrate Virginia's schools.

== Early and Family Life ==
Born in Staunton, George was the first born child of Peyton Cochran and his wife Susie Baldwin Robertson, both of prominent local families. On his mother's side, Cochran was descended from Alexander H.H. Stuart, a U.S. Congressman before the American Civil War who also helped organize the U.S. Department of the Interior under President Millard Fillmore. A.H.H. Stuart later helped negotiate the end of restrictions upon Confederate sympathizers as Reconstruction ended. Cochran's paternal grandfather of the same name served in the Confederate army as a quartermaster and other administrative positions, disappointed that poor eyesight disqualified him from the artillery position he wanted.

Young George Cochran had a sister four years his junior and a brother a decade younger than himself, although he outlived them both. He attended Staunton's schools including Robert E. Lee High school, then Episcopal High School in Alexandria, Virginia. After graduating, Cochran began studying law at the University of Virginia, as had his father and grandfather. At the University of Virginia, he was a member of the Z Society and Beta Theta Pi; he resided on The Lawn. Cochran received his Bachelor of Arts degree in 1934 and a LL.B. degree in 1936 from the University of Virginia Law School. He was elected to Phi Beta Kappa and the Raven Society as an alumnus.

In 1946, Cochran married Marion Lee Stuart.

== Legal and political career ==
After graduation Cochran initially practiced law in Baltimore for two years but struggled financially. He returned to Staunton in 1936, became a member of the Virginia bar and began practicing law with his father. Six years later, World War II erupted, and Cochran served in the U.S. Navy, mostly in the Pacific from 1942 until 1946, as he refused desk and legal jobs and sought those involving amphibious service. In 1964, the former family law firm became Cochran, Lotz and Black. From 1947 to 1969, Cochran also was a trustee of Staunton's Planter's Bank and Trust Company, and was the bank's president during the last six of those years.

After the war, University of Virginia trustee Emily Pancake Smith urged Cochran to run for the legislature, and boards of visitors at Virginia Tech (1960-1968) and Mary Baldwin College (1967-1981) and as a trustee of the Virginia Historical Society.

Cochran won election unopposed to the Virginia House of Delegates in 1947, representing Augusta and Highland counties and the cities of Staunton and Waynesboro. He served from 1948 to 1965 (that becoming the 10th district after the post-1960 census redistricting).

The Senate of Virginia had major redistricting in 1965. Cochran ran in what had become the 19th District (comprising Augusta, Rockbridge and Highland counties and the cities of Staunton, Waynesboro, Buena Vista and Lexington) and would soon become the 21st district). Augusta, Bath and Highland counties and the cities of Staunton and Waynesboro had been in the 21st district in 1963 and 22nd district in 1961, and represented by longtime Byrd lieutenant Curry Carter (who had narrowly defeated Republican Winston Wine in 1961). Now, Democrat Cochran won overwhelmingly, with over 94% of the vote against Republican Winston Wine, who won just 5%.

Cochran served only two years in the Virginia Senate, because after the U.S. Supreme Court decision in Davis v. Mann, another new redistricting plan took effect and Republican H. Dunlop Dawbarn of Waynesboro defeated him in the next election, perhaps as a result of sympathy for losing his wife or outrage over Cochran's distancing himself from the Byrd Organization.

In the General Assembly, Cochran had been one of the "Young Turks," World War II veterans who disagreed with the Byrd Organization on many education and civil rights issues, although he was not as liberal as Armistead Boothe of Alexandria. They introduced measures to abolish Jim Crow laws and the poll tax, which didn't pass until much later; and the Organization retaliated by limiting their committee assignments. Like Boothe, Mosby Perrow Jr. and Tayloe Murphy, Cochran advocated keeping schools open during Virginia's "Massive Resistance," whereby U.S. Senator Harry F. Byrd, Sr. vowed to prevent public school desegregation after the Brown v. Board of Education Supreme Court decisions. After January 19, 1959, when both a three-judge federal panel and the Virginia Supreme Court declared the Stanley Plan of various laws adopted in a special 1956 legislative session unconstitutional, Governor J. Lindsay Almond and Lieutenant Governor Gi Stephens broke with the Byrd Organization's decision to continue Massive Resistance. They narrowly secured legislative approval of a commission chaired by Senator Perrow to craft the Commonwealth's response to "Brown II." Cochran was among the Perrow Commission's members and later described its work in dismantling Massive Resistance for the Augusta Historical Society. Historian Katharine Brown considered Cochran "one of just a small handful of people that had the courage to buck the dominant opinion in Virginia of massive resistance.... That took courage and was a remarkable thing that he did." Cochran later took pride in helping to convince Governor Mills E. Godwin, another leader of Massive Resistance, to support creation of Virginia's community college system.

President of the Virginia Bar Association in 1966, Cochran also served as a member of the Constitutional Revision Commission of Virginia in 1968-69. He was also a fellow of the American Bar Foundation, and of the American College of Probate Law, as well as charter fellow of the Virginia Bar Foundation. From 1986 until his death, Cochran also chaired the Frontier Culture Museum of Virginia in Staunton.

== Judicial career ==
Since both Chief Justice John W. Eggleston and Justice Archibald C. Buchanan announced their retirements from the Supreme Court of Appeals on the same day, Governor Mills E. Godwin Jr. had two slots to fill. He had already promised his first appointment to that court to former Attorney General (1958–62) and Governor (1962-66) Albertis S. Harrison, Jr (who had unsuccessfully defended the Massive Resistance cases in court). From the list of attorneys suggested by the Virginia Bar Association, Godwin nominated Cochran to fill the other vacant seat. Fellow legislators approved his nomination in August 1969 and also elected him to a full 12-year term in 1973. Cochran retired from active service on the Court on his 75th birthday in 1987, but continued to sit for many years as a retired justice.

In 1995, Cochran and his wife Lee were named Outstanding Virginians.

== Death and legacy ==
Cochran died at his home in Staunton on Saturday, January 22, 2011, aged 98, and was buried at Staunton's Thornrose Cemetery after a service at Trinity Episcopal Church, on whose vestry he had served for many years. On March 24, 2011, Staunton's City Council renamed the City Court building the George M. Cochran Judicial Center in his honor. His papers may be at the Virginia Historical Society, along with those of his grandfather of the same name.
