= Harry L. Carrico =

American judge

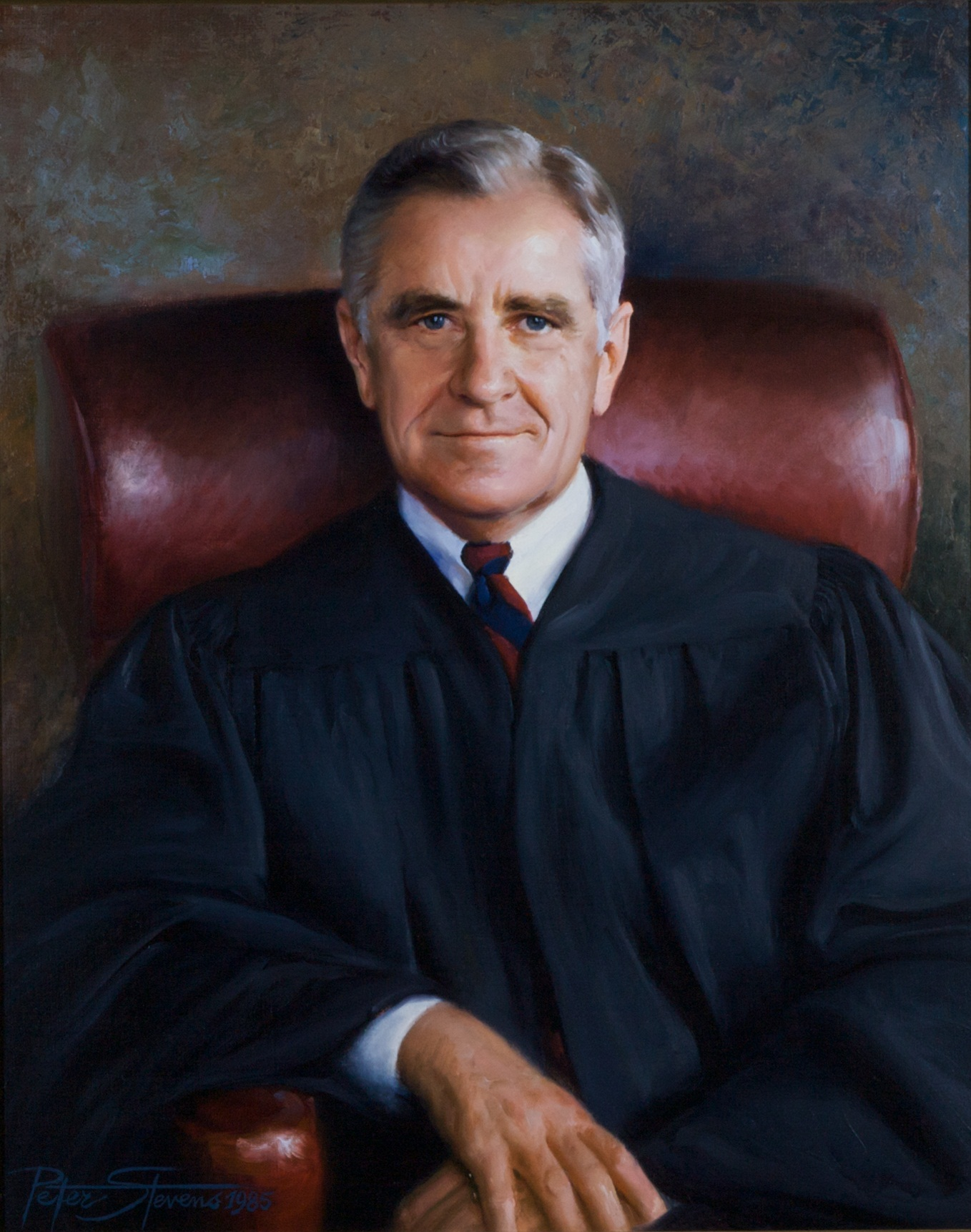

23rd Chief Justice of Virginia
- In office February 1, 1981 – February 1, 2003
- Preceded by: Lawrence W. I'Anson
- Succeeded by: Leroy R. Hassell Sr.

Justice of the Supreme Court of Virginia
- In office January 30, 1961 – February 1, 2003
- Preceded by: Willis D. Miller
- Succeeded by: G. Steven Agee

Personal details
- Born: Harry Lee Carrico; September 4, 1916 Washington, D.C., U.S.
- Died: January 27, 2013 (aged 96) Richmond, Virginia, U.S.
- Spouse(s): Betty Lou Peck; Lynn Brackenridge
- Education: George Washington University

Harry Lee Carrico (September 4, 1916 – January 27, 2013) was a member, Chief Justice, and Senior Justice of the Supreme Court of Virginia. His tenure as an active Justice of the Court, at more than 42 years, was the longest of any justice excluding William Fleming, who served nearly 44 years, from 1780 to 1824. Because current law requires active judges and Justices in Virginia to retire or take senior status on or shortly after their seventieth birthdays, Justice Carrico's longevity record likely will not be challenged.

== Early life and education ==
Carrico was born in Washington, D.C. and soon after moved to Fauquier County. He attended Fairfax County, Virginia public schools and received his undergraduate and law degrees from George Washington University.

== Career ==
Carrico began his legal career as an associate in the law firm of Rust & Rust, Fairfax (1941–43); he was then appointed to serve as a trial justice and judge of Fairfax County Juvenile and Domestic Relations Court (1943–51). He returned to the private practice of law (1951–56).

In 1956 he was appointed a judge of the Fairfax County Circuit Court. He was elevated to the Supreme Court in 1961. He served as a justice until 1981 when, by virtue of seniority, he became chief justice. (The chief justice is no longer selected by seniority, but is elected by the justices to a four-year term). During his tenure as chief justice, Carrico served as President of the Conference of Chief Justices from 1989 to 1990. He retired from active service in 2003 and took senior status.

Carrico was succeeded as chief justice by Leroy Rountree Hassell, Sr., the first black Chief Justice of the Supreme Court of Virginia. The vacancy created by Carrico's retirement was filled by G. Steven Agee, a former member of the General Assembly.

Carrico's daughter, Lucretia Carrico sits as a General District Judge in the Eleventh Judicial Circuit for the Commonwealth of Virginia. Judge Lucretia Carrico sits primarily in Petersburg, Virginia, but may also sit in Powhatan, Amelia, Dinwiddie or Nottoway counties. As a general district judge she hears misdemeanor cases, preliminary hearings for felony cases and civil cases involving sums less than $15,000.00.

== Loving v. Commonwealth ==
Justice Carrico was the author of the Virginia Supreme Court's unanimous 1966 opinion in Loving v. Commonwealth, upholding Virginia's miscegenation statutes. Richard Loving and his wife, Mildred Loving, had been convicted of living together as husband and wife without being legally married, since their Washington, D.C. interracial marriage was not recognized by the Commonwealth of Virginia. Both were sentenced to one year in prison for miscegenation, but their sentence was suspended on the condition that they leave the Commonwealth of Virginia and not return for 25 years together. They appealed the case to the Virginia Supreme Court.

In Loving, Justice Carrico stated that, "There is no dispute that Richard Perry Loving is a white person and that Mildred Jeter Loving is a colored person within the meaning of Code, § 20-58. Nor is there any dispute that the actions of the defendants, as set forth in the indictment, violated the provisions of Code, § 20-58." Ignoring a whole host of Supreme Court precedents, Carrico went on to rely on the infamous and discredited Plessy v. Ferguson, 163 U.S. 537, 41 L. Ed. 256, 16 S. Ct. 1138 (1896) and its progeny, finding Brown v. Board of Education, 347 U.S. 483, 98 L. Ed. 873, 74 S. Ct. 686 (1954) distinguishable, because Brown dealt with education and not marriage. Distinguishing Brown and its progeny, Justice Carrico observed that "it must be pointed out that none of them deals with miscegenation statutes or curtails a legal truth which has always been recognized that there is an overriding state interest in the institution of marriage. None of these decisions takes away from what was said by the United States Supreme Court in Maynard v. Hill, 125 U.S. 190, 31 L. Ed. 654, 657, 8 S. Ct. 723:

Marriage, as creating the most important relation in life, as having more to do with the morals and civilization of a people than any other institution, has always been subject to the control of the Legislature.

Justice Carrico further held that "Although the defendants were, by the terms of the suspended sentences, ordered to leave the state, their sentences did not technically constitute [illegal] banishment because they were permitted to return to the state, provided they did not return together or at the same time." He therefore remanded the case so that the decision could be modified to prohibit Mr. and Mrs. Loving from cohabiting as husband and wife in Virginia, a less restrictive condition of the 25-year suspended sentence.

The Loving decision was subsequently overruled by a unanimous United States Supreme Court in 1967. The U.S. Supreme Court concluded that anti-miscegenation laws were racist and had been enacted to perpetuate white supremacy:

There is patently no legitimate overriding purpose independent of invidious racial discrimination which justifies this classification. The fact that Virginia prohibits only interracial marriages involving white persons demonstrates that the racial classifications must stand on their own justification, as measures designed to maintain White Supremacy.

In Loving v. Virginia, the U.S. Supreme Court held that marriage is one of the basic civil rights of man, a fundamental freedom which could not be denied based on race.

== Later service ==
During Carrico's tenure as Chief Justice, which began in 1981 and lasted 22 years, he was an advocate for the admission of women and minorities to the legal profession in the Commonwealth. He also was the moving force behind the institution of Virginia's first-in-the-nation mandatory professionalism course, which every attorney must complete within 12 months of admission as an active member of the Virginia State Bar. At the time of his retirement in 2003 after his historic 42-year tenure on the Virginia Supreme Court, he was a widely respected figure in the Virginia legal and judicial communities. In 2007, the professionalism course he founded was named in his honor by the Virginia State Bar, which also named its annual professionalism award in his honor; he was the first recipient.

Carrico died, aged 96, in Richmond, Virginia.
