= Henry H. Whiting =

American judge

Henry Hudson Whiting

Justice of the Supreme Court of Virginia
- In office 1987–2002
- Nominated by: John N. Dalton
- Preceded by: George M. Cochran

Personal details
- Born: July 20, 1923; Colorado, U.S.
- Died: September 17, 2012 (aged 89)

Henry Hudson Whiting (July 20, 1923 in Colorado – September 17, 2012) was a member of the Supreme Court of Virginia.

== Early and family life ==
One of eight children born to Lt. Col. Edgar Mason Whiting and Helen Hudson Whiting. His godfather was General George S. Patton, an old friend of Lt. Col. Whiting's from military days. After numerous moves due to his father's military postings, Whiting's family moved in 1934 to Winchester, Virginia, where he was based the remainder of his life. He graduated from John Handley High School and attended Virginia Polytechnic Institute for one year.

=== World War II officer ===
Whiting enlisted in the US Army shortly after the outbreak of World War II. After attending Officer Candidate School (OCS), he received a commission as second lieutenant and initially trained officers at the OCS in Ft. Knox, Kentucky. In late 1944 he deployed to Europe as a first lieutenant in charge of a reconnaissance platoon. He witnessed the end of the Battle of the Bulge after the tide had turned in favor of the Allies and also was present during the fight for the bridge at Remagen. During the waning days of the war, he also briefly served as an observer on the staff of General Patton. After VE Day, Whiting served with the Army of Occupation in Europe until May 1946. During this time, he acted as counsel defending minor courts-martial cases and there developed a strong, lifelong interest in the law.

=== Legal education ===
Upon his discharge, Whiting entered the University of Virginia and with the help of GI Bill benefits, graduated from law school in 1949. He was editor of the Law Review, first in his class and was elected as a member of The Order of the Coif and the Raven Society.

== Personal life ==
Whiting married Helen Patricia Stephenson (1928–1980) of Winchester, Virginia in 1953; they divorced in 1971. They had two children, Brian and John. He attended the First Presbyterian Church, where he taught adult and teen Sunday School classes for a number of years.

== Career ==
Admitted to the Virginia bar, Whiting returned to Winchester and entered into the practice of law with J. Sloan Kuykendall, longtime Secretary of the Virginia Board of Law Examiners. They were joined later by Lewis Costello and the firm, Kuykendall, Whiting and Costello became the largest law firm in Winchester. Eventually the firm opened a branch office in Leesburg, Virginia.

== Judicial career ==
After 31 years in private legal practice, Whiting was appointed in 1980 to the 26th Judicial Circuit of Virginia by Gov. John N. Dalton, and the Virginia General Assembly confirmed him as a circuit court judge.

In 1987, the General Assembly elected Whiting to serve on the Supreme Court of Virginia, following the retirement of Justice George M. Cochran. Whiting thus became the first member of the Supreme Court of Virginia from the Winchester-Frederick County area in over 100 years. A major ruling unanimously handed down by the Virginia Supreme Court during Whiting's tenure was Timothy W. Spencer v Commonwealth, which was the first state supreme court ruling on the admissibility of DNA profiling. The Court's ruling on the admissibility of DNA evidence was later upheld at the federal appeals level and by the U.S. Supreme Court.

Whiting served on the Court until he stepped down to Senior (semi-retired) status in 1995. Justice Whiting continued to serve the Court as a Senior Justice until 2002. During his tenure, Justice Whiting authored 235 opinions for the Court. To honor his service, the Supreme Court of Virginia convened a special session in Winchester, its first ever there, on July 17, 2002.

== Death and legacy ==
Judge Whiting died in 2012. Three years earlier, on January 30, 2009, his portrait was presented to the Frederick-Winchester Judicial Center in a special ceremony sponsored by the Frederick Winchester Bar Association.
