= John Charles Thomas (judge) =

American judge

John C. Thomas

Justice of the Supreme Court of Virginia
- In office April 25, 1983 – November 1, 1989
- Appointed by: Charles S. Robb
- Preceded by: W. Carrington Thompson
- Succeeded by: Leroy R. Hassell Sr.

Personal details
- Born: John Charles Thomas; September 18, 1950 (age 75) Norfolk, Virginia, U.S.
- Education: University of Virginia (BA, JD)

John Charles Thomas (born September 18, 1950) is an American attorney and a former justice of the Supreme Court of Virginia.

Thomas graduated from the University of Virginia with a Bachelor of Arts in American government in 1972. He next attended the University of Virginia School of Law and received his Juris Doctor in 1975. Following law school, Thomas joined Hunton & Williams, then styled Hunton, Williams, Gay & Gibson. He was the first African-American at the firm. "I did not know what to expect. We were not many years from the searing violence that scarred the nation during the days of the Civil Rights Movement; the Selma March, King's assassination, riots in the streets of major cities all were within recent memory. And so it was a major step to be the first Black lawyer at Hunton & Williams; I saw it as part of the integration of our society." He was admitted to the law firm's partnership in April 1982 and was the first Black lawyer in the history of the American South — from Virginia to Texas — to come to an old-line, southern law firm out of law school and "go up the line" to make partner.

In 1983, he was appointed to the Supreme Court of Virginia, becoming the first African American and (being 32) the youngest person of any race to sit there. In the middle of his seventh year on the court, he resigned (due to illness) and was succeeded by Leroy Rountree Hassell, Sr. who later became the court's first black chief justice. Following his retirement from the Supreme Court of Virginia in 1989, Judge Thomas practiced law in Richmond, Virginia as part of the Hunton Andrews Kurth LLP law firm. Judge Thomas is now retired.

In 1995, he received the NAACP's Lifetime Image Award. In 2005, Thomas was named a member of the Court of Arbitration for Sport, which is based in Lausanne, Switzerland. The members of the Court include lawyers and former jurists from around the world. CAS is an independent arbitral institution created in 1983 to settle sports-related disputes involving drug violations and rules of international sports federations. It hears cases arising from most world-class sporting competition and has global jurisdiction. The Court has offices in Lausanne, Switzerland; Sydney, Australia; and New York City, and establishes ad hoc offices in Olympic host cities, as required.

In 2006, Thomas was appointed to the Board of Visitors of the College of William & Mary, a position to which he was reappointed in 2009. In 2009, Thomas asked to be considered for a seat on the federal 4th Circuit Court of Appeals. The Virginia Bar Association included Thomas on the list of candidates it submitted to Virginia's two senators on February 24, 2009.

== See also ==
- List of African-American jurists
- List of first minority male lawyers and judges in Virginia
