= Robert R. Prentis =

American judge

16th Chief Justice of Virginia
- In office March 10, 1926 – November 25, 1931
- Preceded by: Frederick W. Sims
- Succeeded by: Preston W. Campbell

Justice of the Supreme Court of Virginia
- In office February 1, 1917 – November 25, 1931
- Appointed by: Henry C. Stuart
- Preceded by: Richard H. Cardwell
- Succeeded by: Joseph W. Chinn

Personal details
- Born: Robert Riddick Prentis; May 24, 1855 Charlottesville, Virginia, U.S.
- Died: November 25, 1931 (aged 76) Suffolk, Virginia, U.S.
- Spouse: Mary Allen Darden
- Education: University of Virginia

Robert Riddick Prentis (May 24, 1855 – November 25, 1931) was a Virginia lawyer, politician and judge. He served as a justice of the Supreme Court of Virginia from 1917 through 1931, and was the chief justice of the Court for the last five years on the bench.

== Early life and education ==
Prentis was born on May 24, 1855, to the former Margaret Ann Whitehead at the University of Virginia. His father Robert Riddick Sr. was a lawyer who became collector of internal revenue during the American civil war, as well as clerk of Albemarle county and proctor of the university. His education was very scant because of the American Civil War and death of his father.

== Career ==
When just a very young man, he worked for a short time in the clerk's office in Albemarle County, Virginia, and from there entered the University of Virginia in 1875. After graduating with a law degree, he opened a law office in Charlottesville in 1876. In 1878, however, he moved to Norfolk. An opportunity to practice with A.C. Withers was accepted in 1880 and Prentis moved to Suffolk, which was his home for the rest of his life. His first political office was as Mayor of Suffolk from 1883 to 1885. In 1894, he was elected Judge of the First Judicial Circuit of Virginia. He held that position until 1907 when he was appointed a member of the State Corporation Commission. In December 1916, he was elected to the Supreme Court of Appeals and, on March 10, 1926, became its first "Chief Justice". Prior to this, the judge longest in continuous service was called "President" of the court. He was on the court until his death in 1931.

In 1927, Governor Harry F. Byrd, Sr. appointed Prentis the chair of a Commission to recommend Constitutional amendments to give cities and counties greater flexibility. The commission became known as the Prentis Commission. Its recommendations were based on the New York Bureau of Municipal Research and a Virginian Citizens' Committee on Consolidation and Simplification in State and Local Governments. They were passed in two successive sessions of the General Assembly, and approved by the voters in a 1928 referendum.

Robert R. Prentis's brother-in-law was Nathaniel Beaman, Co-founder and President of the National Bank of Commerce of Norfolk, Virginia, and Mayor of Norfolk in 1901 (filled the remainder of predecessor's term). Beaman named his first son Robert Prentis Beaman, after Robert R. Prentis, and the name has subsequently passed to two other descendants. The latest, Robert Prentis Beaman III, followed in his namesake's footsteps, graduating from William and Mary Law School earning Order of the Coif honors, and currently resides in Portsmouth, Virginia.
