= Leroy R. Hassell Sr. =

American judge

24th Chief Justice of Virginia
- In office February 1, 2003 – February 1, 2011
- Preceded by: Harry L. Carrico
- Succeeded by: Cynthia D. Kinser

Justice of the Supreme Court of Virginia
- In office December 28, 1989 – February 9, 2011
- Appointed by: Gerald L. Baliles
- Preceded by: John C. Thomas
- Succeeded by: Cleo E. Powell

Personal details
- Born: Leroy Rountree Hassell; August 17, 1955 Norfolk, Virginia, U.S.
- Died: February 9, 2011 (aged 55) Richmond, Virginia, U.S.
- Spouse: Linda Greene
- Education: University of Virginia (BA); Harvard University (JD)

Leroy Rountree Hassell Sr. (August 17, 1955 – February 9, 2011) was a justice of the Virginia Supreme Court and the first African-American Chief Justice of that Court, serving two four-year terms from February 1, 2003, to January 31, 2011. He was succeeded as Chief Justice by Cynthia D. Kinser.

== Early and family life ==
In 1973, Hassell graduated from Norview High School in Norfolk, Virginia, where his classmates voted him "most likely to succeed". Hassell attended the University of Virginia for his undergraduate degree, earning a BA in 1977 (and earlier achieving the coveted distinction of residing in a room on the Lawn, the original campus designed by Thomas Jefferson). Hassell then attended Harvard Law School, where he edited the Civil Rights-Civil Liberties Law Review and received his J.D. in 1980.

== Career ==
After law school and following admission to the Virginia State Bar, Hassell worked for the Richmond branch of McGuire Woods, where he was made a partner in seven years (1987). He also served as co-counsel to the Richmond Redevelopment and Housing Authority and as chair of the Richmond School Board.

Governor Gerald Baliles appointed Hassell, although only 34 years old, to the Virginia Supreme Court in 1989, and he was seated with legislative approval. In 2002, after the legislature allowed the justices to choose their Chief Justice, his peers selected him. Hassell thus became the first African–American Chief Justice of Virginia when sworn into that office on February 1, 2003. As Chief Justice, Hassell advocated for an independent judiciary as well as greater access to legal services for all Virginians. He also established a commission to reform Virginia's outdated mental health laws.

Hassell also served as jurist-in-residence at the Regent University School of Law, and on the school's Board of Visitors.

== Death and legacy ==
Hassell was ill with what was ultimately diagnosed as lymphoma during most of his final year of service as chief justice. The Virginia Bar Association honored him with its Distinguished service award in 2011. However, Hassell did not sit in his Court's final session in January 2011, and on February 9, 2011, the court announced his death.

Hassell's body lay in state February 11 in the Rotunda of the Virginia State Capitol, his casket draped with the flag of Virginia. He was the first African–American person in Virginia to be accorded that honor. He was survived by his widow, two daughters, a son, and a grandchild. He was interred on February 12, 2011, at Greenwood Memorial Gardens Cemetery following a memorial service at Faith Landmark Ministries. In 2016, the Library of Virginia and Dominion Power honored him as one of their Strong Men and Women in Virginia History.

Regent University School of Law hosts an annual moot court competition which bears Chief Justice Hassell's name in his honor. The competition's 20th anniversary took place in October 2020.

== See also ==
- List of African-American jurists
