= George L. Browning =

American judge

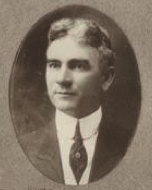

Justice of the Supreme Court of Virginia
- In office February 19, 1930 – August 26, 1947
- Preceded by: Richard H. L. Chichester
- Succeeded by: Abram P. Staples

Member of the Virginia House of Delegates from Orange County
- In office January 14, 1914 – January 9, 1918
- Preceded by: Thomas K. Row
- Succeeded by: Virginius R. Shackelford

Personal details
- Born: George Landon Browning; April 3, 1867 Rappahannock County, Virginia, U.S.
- Died: August 26, 1947 (aged 80) Richmond, Virginia, U.S.
- Party: Democratic
- Spouse: Evelyn Byrd Hill
- Education: Georgetown University; University of Virginia

George Landon Browning (April 3, 1867 – August 26, 1947) was a Virginia politician and a Justice of the Virginia Supreme Court. Born in Rappahannock County, Virginia, Browning was educated in the counties' public schools and also taught school there for several years. Later, he attended Georgetown University, where he graduated with a Bachelor of Law degree. Shortly thereafter, he took post-graduate work in law at the University of Virginia. In 1899, he formed a partnership with James Hay and opened a law office at Madison Courthouse, Virginia. This partnership ended when Judge Hay was made judge of the United States Court of Claims. Judge Browning then moved his practice to Orange, Virginia, in 1909. Here he practiced in partnership with several others until he was elected to the Supreme Court of Appeals on February 19, 1930. In 1914, he had been elected to the Virginia House of Delegates from Orange County, Virginia and served there for two terms. Judge Browning was a member of the Supreme Court for seventeen years and six months until his death.

Virginia House of Delegates
Preceded by Thomas K. Row	Virginia Delegate for Orange County; 1914–1918	Succeeded by Virginius R. Shackelford
Legal offices
Preceded by Richard H. L. Chichester	Justice of the Supreme Court of Virginia; 1930–1947	Succeeded by Abram P. Staples
