= Cynthia D. Kinser =

American judge (born 1951)

25th Chief Justice of Virginia
- In office February 1, 2011 – December 31, 2014
- Preceded by: Leroy R. Hassell Sr.
- Succeeded by: Donald W. Lemons

Justice of the Supreme Court of Virginia
- In office July 8, 1997 – December 31, 2014
- Appointed by: George Allen
- Preceded by: Roscoe B. Stephenson Jr.
- Succeeded by: D. Arthur Kelsey

Magistrate Judge of the United States District Court for the Western District of Virginia
- In office 1990–1997

Personal details
- Born: Cynthia Dinah Fannon; December 20, 1951 (age 74) Pennington Gap, Virginia, U.S.
- Spouse(s): Henry Allen Kinser, Jr.
- Education: University of Tennessee (BA); University of Virginia (JD)

Cynthia Dinah Kinser (born December 20, 1951) is an American lawyer who served as the chief justice of the Supreme Court of Virginia. Kinser was elected by the Virginia General Assembly to her first 12-year term to the Virginia Supreme Court in 1998, after being appointed by Governor George Allen to fill a 1997 vacancy. Kinser was elected to a second 12-year term during the 2010 session of the General Assembly. She became Chief Justice of the Virginia Supreme Court on February 1, 2011. She is the first woman to hold the office of Chief Justice on the Court.

== Education and career ==
Kinser received a Bachelor of Arts degree with honors from the University of Tennessee in 1974, and a Juris Doctor from the University of Virginia School of Law in 1977. Prior to being appointed to the Supreme Court by Governor George Felix Allen, Kinser served as law clerk Judge Glen Morgan Williams of the United States District Court for the Western District of Virginia from 1977 to 1978. She then entered lawyer private practice from 1978 to 1979 and served as Commonwealth's Attorney for Lee County, Virginia from 1980 to 1984. She returned to private practice from 1984 to 1990. She served as a U.S. magistrate judge of the Western District of Virginia from 1990 to 1997.

On May 2, 1997, Governor George Allen appointed Kisner to the Virginia Supreme Court to fill the vacancy left by the retirement of Justice Roscoe B. Stephenson Jr. She began active service on July 8, 1997. She was elected by the General Assembly to a 12-year term commencing on February 1, 1998. She became chief justice of the Virginia Supreme Court on February 1, 2011, succeeding Chief Justice Leroy R. Hassell Sr. Kinser retired from the Supreme Court at the end of 2014.

On May 5, 2015, Kinser began a position as senior counsel with the Roanoke-based law firm Gentry Locke Rakes & Moore, LLP. At Gentry Locke, Kinser will focus on appeals, criminal matters, and government investigations.

== See also ==
- List of female state supreme court justices
