= Joseph L. Kelly =

American judge

Joseph L. Kelly

Joseph Luther Kelly (March 4, 1867 – April 14, 1925) was an American lawyer and judge who served twice on the Supreme Court of Appeals of Virginia. He was elected as the president of the court in his first tenure.

== Biography ==
Kelly was born in Marion, Smyth County, Virginia, the son of Judge John A. and Martha (Peck) Kelly. John A. Kelly was a lawyer and judge of the 16th judicial circuit of Virginia for twenty-five from 1870 to 1895. Martha Peck, daughter of John and Elizabeth Peck, was from Giles county, Virginia.

Joseph L. Kelly's primary education was received in the local schools. In 1881, he entered Emory and Henry College, receiving the Bachelor of Arts degree in 1886 and the Master of Arts degree shortly thereafter. He entered the University of Virginia Law School in 1887 and received the LL. B. degree in 1889. He later received (June 19, 1923) an honorary degree, Doctor of Laws, from Washington and Lee University.

After graduation, he began law practice at Gate City, Scott County, Virginia, in association with Rufus A. Ayers, a former Attorney General of Virginia. They both moved to Big Stone Gap a few years later and continued to practice together until 1895, when Judge Kelly entered into partnership with Joshua Fry Bullitt, Jr. In 1898, he moved to Bristol and the firm maintained offices in both Bristol and Big Stone Gap.

Appointed to the Corporation Court of Bristol, in 1909, Judge Kelly held this position until September 1914, when he was elected to the Supreme Court of Appeals of Virginia. He assumed his duties on that court in January 1914, and was elected president of the court in January 1920. He served until January 31, 1924. At that time, he resigned from the court and returned to practice, opening an office in Lynchburg.

When Judge Frederick W. Sims died in February 1925, Judge Kelly was named to the Supreme Court again. He sat with the court during the March term, 1925 but died shortly thereafter in an accident in his home at Bristol, Virginia.

Kelly was a trustee of Emory and Henry College, a democrat, a Methodist and a member of Kappa Sigma fraternity. He was a member of the Westmoreland and University clubs of Richmond.

On July 29, 1896, he married Mary Eloise Hull, of Marion, Virginia. Their children were: Edith Graham, Kathleen Hull, Mary Bane, Sarah Eloise — and Joseph L. Kelly, Jr (August 27, 1912-April 16, 1999), who also attended the University of Virginia Law School and later practiced law in Norfolk, Virginia.
