= Willis D. Miller =

American judge

Justice of the Supreme Court of Virginia
- In office November 17, 1947 – December 20, 1960
- Appointed by: William M. Tuck
- Preceded by: George L. Browning
- Succeeded by: Harry L. Carrico

Personal details
- Born: Willis Dance Miller; January 30, 1893 Powhatan County, Virginia, U.S.
- Died: December 20, 1960 (aged 67) Virginia, U.S.
- Spouse: Eliza Ingram
- Education: Richmond College; Washington and Lee University

Willis Dance Miller (January 30, 1893 – December 20, 1960) was a justice of the Supreme Court of Appeals of Virginia from 1947 until hours before his death in 1960.

== Early and family life ==
Miller was born in Powhatan County, Virginia to Thomas M. Miller, a Confederate veteran and judge for Powhatan and Cumberland Counties, and his wife Anne Harris Patteson. He attended public schools in Powhatan County, then Randolph Macon Academy in Bedford, graduating in 1909. Later, he attended Richmond College, Washington and Lee University and the University of Richmond School of Law, receiving his law degree in 1914.

Justice Miller was the fifth generation in the direct male line of lawyers in his family, and sired the sixth generation. He married the former Eliza Ingram of Richmond in December 1919. The first Virginia lawyer in the family line, Thomas M. Miller, received his license to practice from George Wythe and John Randolph in 1763, during the time of the French and Indian War. The Justice's only child, also named Thomas M. Miller, was also a lawyer and had become a member of the State Corporation Commission shortly before his father's death.

== Career ==
After admission to the Virginia bar in 1914, Miller established a private legal practice in Richmond, where he practiced until 1935. He was reviser of the Richmond City Code in 1924. From 1925 to 1936, he was Assistant Commonwealth's Attorney for the City of Richmond. In that position, he prosecuted all criminal cases arising on the south side of the James River. These cases were heard in the Manchester Courthouse. (As a result of the agreement by which the cities of Manchester and Richmond merged in 1910, the merged city of Richmond maintained two courthouses until 2007.)

With the endorsement of the bar of the City of Richmond (where he had served as president), he was selected by the Virginia General Assembly to serve as the judge of the Law and Equity Court of Richmond, succeeding Judge Robert N. Pollard, who had been appointed to the United States District Court. He rendered some 6000 decisions as judge of that court, and was reversed in only six.

In 1947, Governor William M. Tuck appointed Miller to the Supreme Court of Appeals of Virginia, the first Richmond lawyer or judge to serve on the state's highest court for more than 100 years. Justice Miller's retirement took effect on December 20, 1960, a few hours before his death on the same day, such that his widow would receive a pension. Justice Miller received an honorary LL. D. from the University of Richmond in 1951.

Justice Miller's character had two aspects. One commentator appreciated his keen sense of humor and penetrating intellect, boundless energy, and "delightful drawl" when speaking. His supporters in the bar characterized him as a friendly and humble man who never looked down upon those who appeared before him, appreciating his surpassing integrity and an innate sense of right and wrong, and lauding his judicial work as guided by a philosophy of judicial restraint, deference to the legislature, and adherence to precedent. Courts should continue "to adhere to precedent whenever reasonably possible and until departure is demanded by most compelling causes", he told the Virginia Bar Association in a 1953 speech. "He wrote in a rugged and straightforward manner", and quickly recognized the right of a case, according to Chief Justice John Eggleston, with whom Justice Miller had served for 13 years on the Supreme Court.

On the other hand, Justice Miller firmly believed in racial segregation, and despite Chief Justice Eggleston's entreaties, refused to join in the decision in Harrison v. Day, which overturned much of the Stanley Plan of Massive Resistance to the U.S. Supreme Court's decisions in Brown v. Board of Education. Instead, Justice Miller sided with his mentor, now-Congressman Tuck, and U.S. Senator Harry F. Byrd, and contended that the U.S. Supreme Court had made Section 129 of the state Constitution (mandating maintenance of "efficient, free public schools") inoperative by the desegregation opinion invalidating Section 140. Other aspects of the Stanley Plan were found unconstitutional by a three judge panel on the same day, January 19, 1959 (Robert E. Lee's birthday, a state holiday in Virginia), and by the U.S. Supreme Court after Miller's death.

== Death and legacy ==
Justice Miller died in a Richmond hospital of a heart attack just hours after retiring from office, which allowed his surviving wife to receive a pension. Governor J. Lindsay Almond Jr. ordered Virginia's flags to fly at half mast in his honor. Fairfax County Circuit Court Judge Harry Lee Carrico succeeded him on the Virginia Supreme Court and later become the longest-serving justice in that court's history.

== Sources ==
- Virginia State Bar Association Reports, volume 72, 1961 and Directory of American Judges, 1955, and Memorial to Justice Willis Dance Miller, 220 Va. cliii (April 17, 1961).
