= Richard Henry Lee Chichester =

American judge

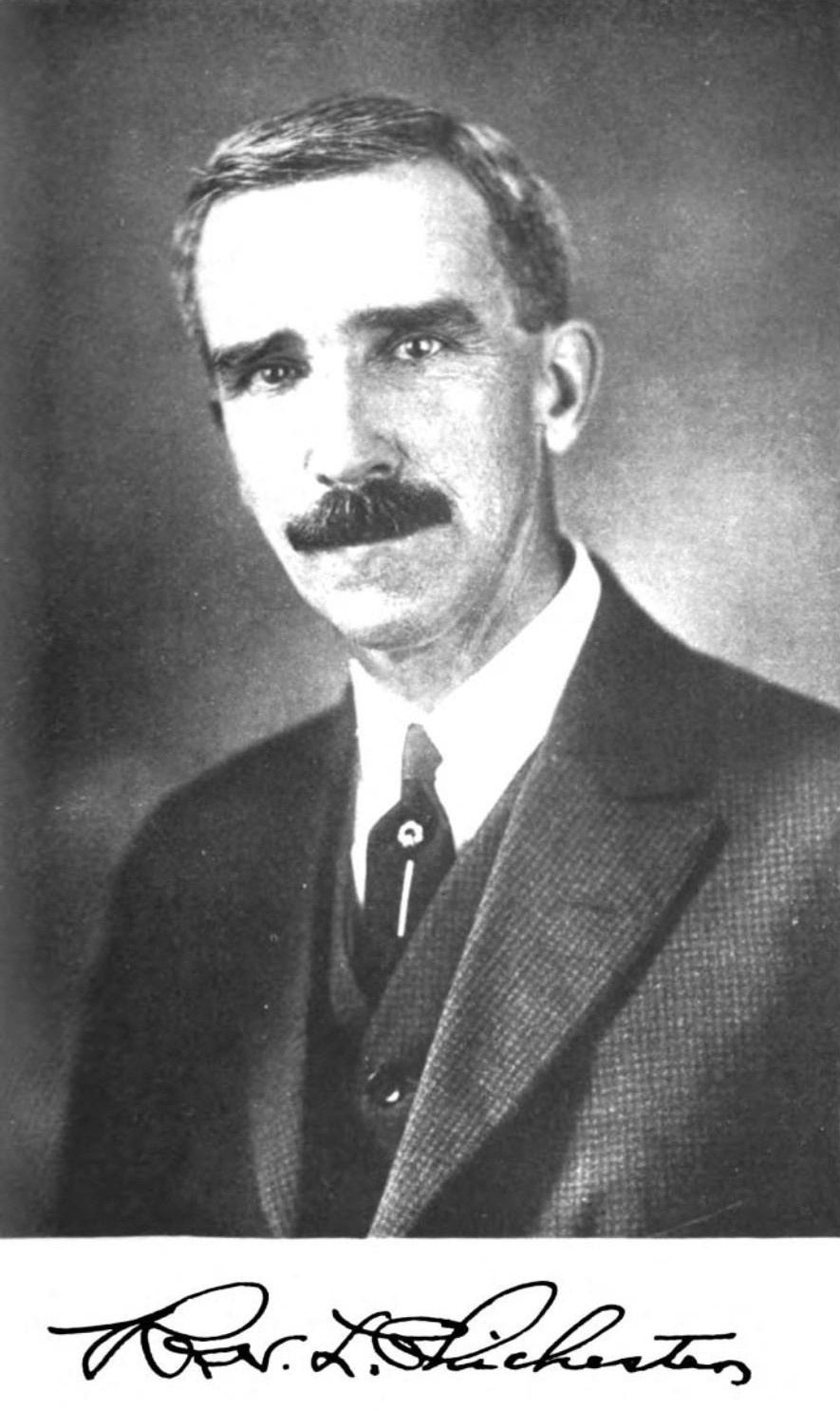
Photographic portrait and signature of Judge Richard Henry Lee Chichester, 1915

Richard Henry Lee Chichester (April 18, 1870 – February 2, 1930) was a Virginia lawyer who served as a Commonwealth's Attorney and as a judge of the Supreme Court of Appeals of Virginia.

== Biography ==
Chichester was born in Fairfax County, Virginia. His father was for many years a judge of the county courts of Fairfax and Alexandria, and his grandfather was Judge Richard C. L. Moncure, a judge and president of the Supreme Court of Appeals of Virginia. Chichester received his early education in private schools in Fairfax County and at St. John's Military Academy in Alexandria. His higher and legal education was received at the University of Virginia. At twenty-one, he was admitted to the bar and began practice in Stafford County, Virginia where he was shortly elected Commonwealth's Attorney. He was elected judge of Stafford and King George Counties in 1898, serving until 1904 when the county courts were abolished. Resuming practice at that time, he entered a law partnership with his brother in Fredericksburg until his appointment, in 1910, as judge of the Fifteenth Judicial Circuit. In 1924, he was appointed a judge of the Special Court of Appeals where he served until June 1, 1925. Upon the death of Judge Joseph L. Kelly in June 1925, Chichester was elected to the Supreme Court of Appeals of Virginia. He remained on the court until his death.
