= Jesse F. West =

American judge (1862–1929)

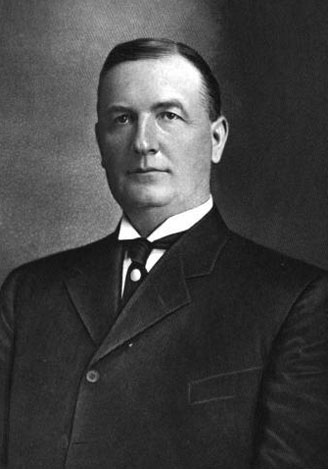

Justice of the Supreme Court of Virginia
- In office February 1, 1922 – October 25, 1929
- Preceded by: Edward W. Saunders
- Succeeded by: Louis S. Epes

Personal details
- Born: Jesse Felix West; July 16, 1862 Sussex County, Virginia, U.S.
- Died: October 25, 1929 (aged 67) Waverly, Virginia, U.S.
- Education: University of North Carolina; University of Virginia

Jesse F. West (July 16, 1862 – October 25, 1929) was born in Sussex County, Virginia. He was educated in public schools, the Suffolk Collegiate Institute and the University of North Carolina, where he graduated in 1885. Following his graduation there, he attended the University of Virginia and studied law under Professor John B. Minor.

He was admitted to the bar in July 1886, and began practice in his home county of Sussex. In 1890, he was elected superintendent of schools, but resigned on January 1, 1892, to accept the offer of judge of the county court. He was elected by the Virginia General Assembly in 1902, to the position of judge of the Third Judicial Circuit, beginning his term on February 1, 1904. On January 17, 1922, West was nominated to the Supreme Court of Appeals to fill the term of Edward W. Saunders, upon the latter's death. He began his tenure on the Court on February 1, 1922, and served there until his death in 1929 at his home in Waverly, Virginia.
