= George Moffett Harrison =

American judge (1847–1923)

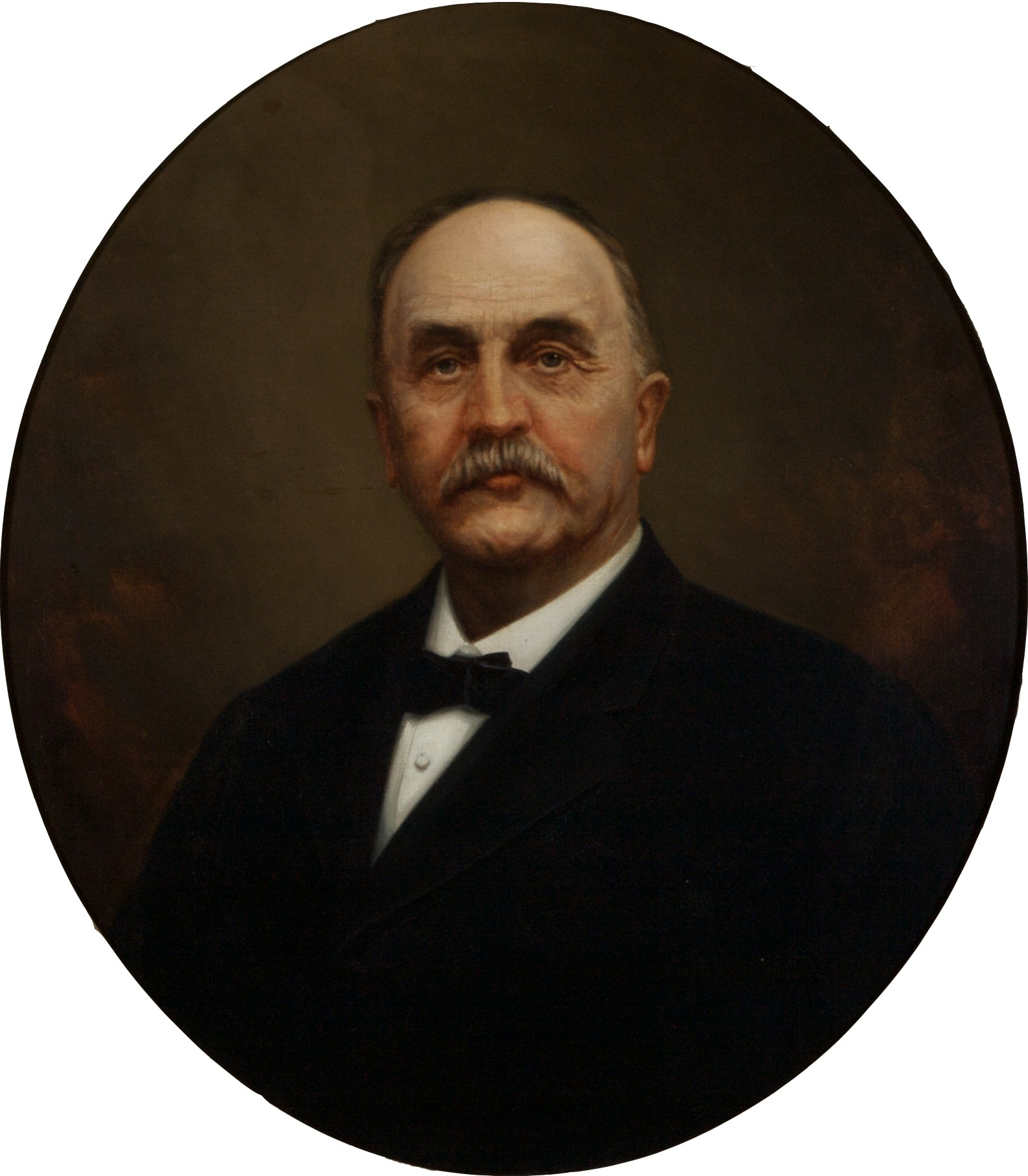
- Oil on canvas portrait of George Moffett Harrison by Harry M. Wegner
- Born: February 14, 1847; Staunton, Virginia, U.S.
- Died: November 22, 1923 (aged 76); Staunton, Virginia, U.S.
- Education: University of Virginia School of Law
- Occupations: Lawyer; judge
- Spouse: Betty Montgomery Kent (m. 1874)
- Children: 3
- Relatives: Edward Norton
- Military career
- Allegiance: Confederate States
- Branch: Confederate States Army
- Conflicts: American Civil War

George Moffett Harrison (February 14, 1847 – November 22, 1923) was an American lawyer and judge who served for 22 years as a justice of the Virginia Supreme Court of Appeals (later named the Supreme Court of Virginia).

Harrison served briefly as the President of the Court from November 16, 1916, to March 6, 1917, before his resignation from the judiciary.

== Biography ==
=== Early years ===
George Moffett Harrison was born at Staunton, Virginia, on February 14, 1847. His father was Henry Harrison, of West Hill, near Staunton and his mother was Jane St. Clair Cochran.

Harrison received his early education from his father. At age 16, during the American Civil War, he enlisted in the Signal Corps of the Confederate Army. Harrison later joined a military company of Augusta County boys, all under age 18. He was later transferred to the Fredericksburg Artillery, where he served until the end of the war. His messmate in the artillery, John D. Goolrick, wrote of Harrison, "loyally, lovingly, patriotically he served the cause of the Confederacy until taps were sounded over our hopes at Appomattox. There was no braver soldier under the Stars and

=== Law career ===
After the war, Harrison returned home and resumed his studies, then taught school for two years,. In 1869 he entered the University of Virginia Law School. Upon completing law course, he opened his office in Staunton.

For several years Harrison worked with Hon. Henry St. George Tucker, III, in the Harrison & Tucker law practice. While a lawyer, Harrison, he took an active interest in politics, though he never sought nor held a political office. He was an advisor to the local Democratic party.

In 1894, the Virginia General Assembly appointed Harrison to the newly formed Supreme Court of Appeals. Harrison was the youngest member of this court. He had been on the court only a few months when he wrote the opinion in Nicholas v. Commonwealth, 91 Virginia Report 741. In 1915, Harrison became the president of the court.

On March 1, 1917, Harrison retired at age 70. At his retirement, Judge James Keith, wrote of him, "during his long service upon the bench he delivered many opinions of great importance which will serve as precedents and constitute a valuable contribution to the law of the State. His opinions are written in a most attractive style, displaying a clear and comprehensive grasp of his subject and an admirable accuracy and lucidity of statement and a soundness of judgement rarely found in combination."

== Personal ==
Harrison was a member of Emmanuel Episcopal Church of Staunton and for years a vestryman of his parish.

He was married September 23, 1874, at Bellefield, Wythe County, Virginia, to Betty Montgomery Kent. Their children were Mrs. Hon. James Quarles and Mrs. Clarke Worthington (Rose), of Staunton, and Joseph Kent Harrison of Butler, Pa. One of his descendants is actor Edward Norton.

Harrison died in Stuanton on November 22, 1923.
