= Kennon C. Whittle =

American judge

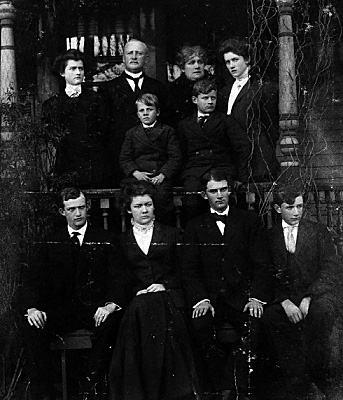
Judge Stafford G. Whittle and family, Martinsville, Virginia, circa 1905. Son Kennon Caithness Whittle, bottom row, far right

Kennon Caithness Whittle (October 12, 1891 – November 10, 1967) was a Virginia lawyer and judge who served as president of the Virginia Bar Association and was elected to the Virginia Supreme Court of Appeals.

== Biography ==
Whittle was born in Martinsville, Virginia, the son of Stafford G. Whittle, a lawyer who served on the Virginia Supreme Court of Appeals from 1901 to 1919. Kennon Whittle attended elementary school in Martinsville and received an LL. B. from Washington and Lee University in 1914. Following his graduation Whittle was admitted to the bar and began practice in Martinsville. Whittle was president of The Virginia Bar Association for 1940–41. In 1944, he was appointed judge of the Seventh Judicial Circuit and, in 1951, was elected to the Supreme Court of Appeals. He served on the Supreme Court until he retired on February 1, 1965. He received an honorary LL. D. from Washington and Lee in 1950 and he was a member of Phi Delta Phi.

Judge Whittle drew controversy when he oversaw the trial of the "Martinsville Seven," a group of seven black men accused of raping a white woman in January 1949. Ruby Floyd had accused the seven men of raping her. Subsequently, all seven were arrested, and confessed both after arrest and in their trials; their guilt was never in question. In short order, the seven men were found guilty and were sentenced to death—the sentence under Virginia law at the time.

Alerted to the case and its growing controversy, the National Association for the Advancement of Colored People (NAACP) campaigned against the verdicts, arguing that the sentences violated the equal-protection provisions of the U.S. Constitution (no white man had ever been sentenced to death in Virginia for rape). But Judge Whittle ruled that because of the brutality of the crime and the findings of guilt that the men's sentences were appropriate. The seven were ultimately executed in 1951. In denying the appeal of one of the 'Martinsville Seven,' Justice Edward W. Hudgins of Virginia's Supreme Court of Appeals ruled that the death penalty "does not depend upon the race of the accused, but on the circumstances, aggravation and enormity of the crime...the law applies to all alike regardless of race or creed."

In the rape of Mrs. Floyd, he said, the severity of the crime demonstrated that the accused showed no mercy. "Francis Grayson, a man of 37 years of age, saw the four men attacking Mrs. Floyd," Judge Hudgins wrote of the appellant. "Instead of helping her, he left the scene, informed two others of what was taking place, the three went to the scene, and each in return, ravished Mrs. Floyd. One can hardly conceive of a more atrocious, a more beastly crime."'

Justice Kennon Whittle was married to the former Mary Holt Spencer, whose sister Blanche married Julian Robertson Sr. of Salisbury, North Carolina. Robertson was a prominent textile company executive, private investor and philanthropist. A third Spencer sister, Margaret, married Dr. John Armstrong Shackelford, chief surgeon of Martinsville's Shackelford Hospital. For much of his life, Justice Whittle lived at Belleview, listed on the National Register of Historic Places and built by Major John Redd of the Continental Army, an ancestor of both Whittle and his wife.
