= Edward W. Hudgins =

American judge

19th Chief Justice of Virginia
- In office October 5, 1947 – July 29, 1958
- Preceded by: Henry W. Holt
- Succeeded by: John W. Eggleston

Justice of the Supreme Court of Virginia
- In office February 1, 1930 – July 29, 1958
- Preceded by: None (seat created)
- Succeeded by: Lawrence W. I'Anson

Member of the Virginia House of Delegates from Mecklenburg County
- In office January 12, 1916 – January 14, 1920
- Preceded by: John T. Lewis
- Succeeded by: Robert L. Jeffreys

Personal details
- Born: Edward Wren Hudgins; January 17, 1882 Buckingham, Virginia, U.S.
- Died: July 29, 1958 (aged 76) Chase City, Virginia, U.S.
- Spouse: Lucy Henry Morton
- Education: University of Richmond

Edward Wren Hudgins (January 17, 1882 – July 29, 1958) was a Virginia lawyer, political figure and judge. From 1947 to 1958, he served as the 19th Chief Justice of the Supreme Court of Virginia.

== Biography ==
Hudgins was born in Buckingham County, Virginia. He received his education from private tutors and public schools of his home county. At seventeen, he went to Richmond to go to college. He entered Richmond College (now University of Richmond) graduating in 1905 with a Bachelor of Arts degree. For the next year, he was the principal of a public high school and, in the fall of 1906, he entered T. C. Williams Law School at Richmond College, receiving his law degree in 1908. In order to supplement his funds while attending law school, he taught Latin in Miss Ellett's School in Richmond (now St. Catherine’s). In 1908, Judge Hudgins began his practice in Chase City, Mecklenburg County, and, in 1916, was elected to the Virginia House of Delegates from that county, serving until 1920. He was elected judge of the Thirty-Fourth Judicial Circuit in 1926. Just four years later, on January 17, 1930, he was elected to the Supreme Court of Appeals, the membership of the court being increased at that time from five to seven justices. Seventeen years later, in 1947, he became Chief Justice and served on the court until his death. Justice Hudgins was a member of Phi Beta Kappa and Phi Alpha Delta.
