= Claude V. Spratley =

American judge

Claude Vernon Spratley (July 16, 1882 – October 25, 1976) was born in Surry County, Virginia. He attended the College of William and Mary, where he received a Bachelor of Arts degree in 1901 and the University of Virginia School of Law, receiving his law degree in 1906. Afterward, he was admitted to the bar and began practice in Hampton, Virginia. From 1912 to 1923 he was city attorney for Hampton and town attorney for Phoebus, Virginia, from 1910 to 1923. In 1923, he was elected judge of the Eleventh Judicial Circuit and served there until being elected to the Supreme Court of Appeals in 1936. Justice Spratley remained on this court until he retired on September 30, 1967. Justice Spratley was a member of Phi Beta Kappa and Phi Delta Phi.
