= Orloff M. Dorman =

American judge (1809–1879)

Orloff Mather Dorman (January 7, 1809 – June 16, 1879) was a justice of the Supreme Court of Virginia from 1869 to 1870.

Born in Wilbraham, Massachusetts, he was initially named "Orlow", which he changed to "Orloff" in his younger years. He received a B.A. from Amherst College in 1831, and read law under Azon Taber of Albany, New York, from 1831 to 1833, while teaching at the Albany Female Academy. He then moved to Florida, continuing to read law under Charles Downing of St. Augustine, Florida, from 1834 to 1835, thereafter practicing law in Florida until 1847.

During the American Civil War, he served in the Union Army as a paymaster, with rank of major, from 1862 to 1866. He was thereafter named a judge of the Corporation Court of Norfolk, Virginia, from 1867 to 1868. He was named to the Virginia state supreme court during Reconstruction, on May 6, 1869, by the commander of the First Military District overseeing civilian government in Virginia. He served until January 26, 1870, when civilian rule was restored.

Dorman married Margarette E. Gould, of Hampshire County, Massachusetts, on September 4, 1845. They had no children. Dorman thereafter resided in Virginia until his death, at his home in Norfolk, Virginia, at the age of 70.
