= Frederick W. Sims =

American judge

Frederick W. Sims (July 23, 1862 – February 8, 1925) was a Virginia political figure and judge. Sims was born in Louisa County, Virginia during the height of the American Civil War. As a youth, he learned to work diligently for everything, even though he was a frail boy. He received his early education in the local private and public schools and, later, at the University of Virginia. He was forced to leave the university shortly after his entrance, however, when his father died. Because of his desire to be a lawyer, he studied long hours and was admitted to the bar in 1885. He began practice at Louisa and, just six years later, was elected judge of the county court. This position was held until the county courts were abolished in February 1904. After leaving the bench of the county court, he returned to private practice until November 1905, when he was elected to the Virginia State Senate. Shortly after his term as senator expired, he was elected Mayor of Louisa and filled this office for several years. His health became much worse a few years later, but he continued working. On February 2, 1916, Judge Sims was elected to the Supreme Court of Appeals and, on January 31, 1924, became president of that court. He served as president less than a year before he was granted a leave because of his health, and died before he could return to the court.
