= Archibald C. Buchanan =

American judge

Archibald C. Buchanan (January 7, 1890 – May 3, 1979) was born in Tazewell, Virginia. He received his higher education at Hampden-Sydney College (B.A. degree, 1910) and Washington and Lee University. (LL. B. degree, 1914). He was admitted to the bar and began practice in Tazewell, where he was mayor from 1917 to 1921 and commissioner of accounts from 1919 to 1927. He was elected judge of the Twenty-second Judicial Circuit in 1927 and served in that position until 1946 when he was elected to the Supreme Court of Appeals of Virginia. Justice Buchanan remained on the bench of the Supreme Court until he retired on September 30, 1969. Justice Buchanan was a member of Phi Beta Kappa and Phi Delta Phi. He received honorary Doctor of Law (LL. D.) degrees from Washington & Lee University in May 1949 and from Hampden-Sydney College in June 1969.
