= Alexander Harman =

American judge

Alexander M. Harman Jr. (1921 – October 31, 1996) was a justice of the Supreme Court of Appeals of Virginia from 1969 to 1979.

Born in War, West Virginia in 1921, Harman attended Concord College in Athens, West Virginia. He then entered Washington and Lee University Law School and, after graduation, was admitted to the bar in Virginia. In 1943, he started practice in Pulaski, Virginia.

In 1964, Harman was appointed a judge of the Twenty-First Judicial Circuit. In August 1969, he was elected to the Supreme Court of Appeals of Virginia. Justice Harman resigned from the Supreme Court of Appeals on December 31, 1979.
