= Barbara Milano Keenan =

Austrian-American judge (born 1950)

Barbara Keenan
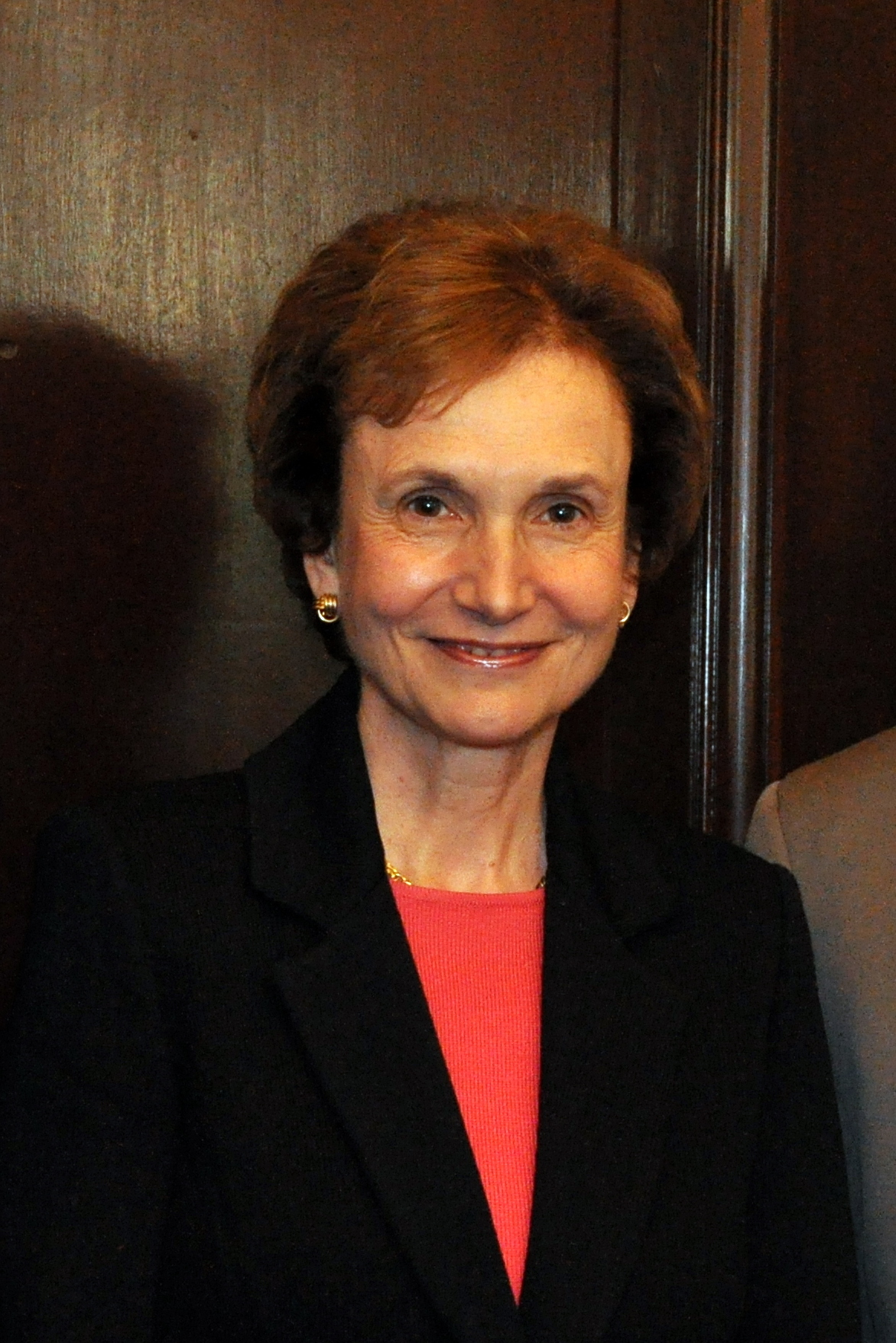

Senior Judge of the United States Court of Appeals for the Fourth Circuit
- Incumbent
- Assumed office August 31, 2021

Judge of the United States Court of Appeals for the Fourth Circuit
- In office March 9, 2010 – August 31, 2021
- Appointed by: Barack Obama
- Preceded by: Hiram Emory Widener Jr.
- Succeeded by: Toby J. Heytens

Justice of the Virginia Supreme Court
- In office July 2, 1991 – March 9, 2010
- Preceded by: Charles S. Russell
- Succeeded by: William C. Mims

Personal details
- Born: Barbara Louise Milano; 1950 (age 75–76) Vienna, Austria
- Education: Cornell University (BA); George Washington University (JD); University of Virginia (LLM)

Barbara Louise Milano Keenan (née Milano; born 1950) is a senior United States circuit judge of United States Court of Appeals for the Fourth Circuit and a former justice on the Supreme Court of Virginia.

== Early life and education ==
Keenan was born in Vienna, Austria, where her father, a highly decorated World War II veteran, was serving as chief of intelligence operations after the war. She was raised in Northern Virginia. Keenan received her Bachelor of Arts degree from Cornell University in 1971 and her Juris Doctor from George Washington University Law School in 1974. She also earned a Master of Laws degree from the University of Virginia School of Law in 1992.

== Professional career ==
From 1974 to 1976, Keenan was an assistant commonwealth's attorney for Fairfax County, Virginia, before entering private practice, first as a solo practitioner and then as partner in the firm Keenan, Ardis and Roehrenbeck. In 1980, she was made a judge of the General District Court of Fairfax County, and two years later became the first woman to be elected to a Circuit Court judgeship by the Virginia General Assembly. In 1985, she was elected as one of the first ten judges of the newly created Court of Appeals of Virginia, making her the first woman to serve as a state appellate court judge in Virginia. She is the first woman to serve on all levels of the Virginia court system. In 2011, she wrote the foreword to the first volume of Jurist Prudent, the collected opinions of her former Supreme Court of Virginia colleague Sr. Justice Lawrence L. Koontz, Jr.

== Service on the Supreme Court of Virginia ==
In 1991 Keenan was elected to be a justice of the Supreme Court of Virginia, succeeding Justice Charles S. Russell. She was reelected in 2003 to a second 12-year term on the Court. She is the only Virginia jurist to serve at every level of Virginia's judicial system (District, Circuit, Court of Appeals, and Supreme Court). Sr. Justices Lawrence L. Koontz, Jr. and Leroy F. Millette, Jr. and Justice Cleo Powell have also served at every level of the state's court system. She joins Judge G. Steven Agee of that court as the second Virginia Supreme Court Justice (and former Virginia Court of Appeals judge) to advance to the federal appellate bench in recent times.

== Federal judicial service ==
In 2009, Keenan asked to be considered for a seat on the United States Court of Appeals for the Fourth Circuit. The Virginia Bar Association included her name on the list of candidates it submitted to Virginia's two senators on February 24, 2009. On June 2, 2009, Virginia's senators recommended that President Barack Obama nominate her to the Fourth Circuit. On September 14, 2009, Obama formally nominated Keenan to the Fourth Circuit, and the Senate Judiciary Committee backed her nomination. On February 26, 2010, Senate Majority Leader Harry Reid filed for cloture on Keenan's nomination. The Senate voted 99–0 to invoke cloture on her nomination on March 2, 2010. She was confirmed later that day by a 99–0 vote. She received her commission on March 9, 2010. She assumed senior status on August 31, 2021.

== Notable cases ==
In Seay v. Cannon, on June 21, 2019, Keenan, who was joined by A. Marvin Quattlebaum Jr., ruled that double jeopardy bars retrial after a mistrial is granted over a defendant's objection. Paul V. Niemeyer dissented. On March 30, 2020, the Supreme Court denied certiorari, although Justices Thomas, Alito, and Kavanaugh would have granted cert to the case.

Keenan strongly dissented in part in an August 9, 2021 decision which ruled that a charter school's policy to force female students to wear dresses or skirts did not violate Title IX, despite allowing the Title IX lawsuit to continue. Keenan explained "No, this is not 1821 or 1921. It’s 2021. Women serve in combat units of our armed forces. Women walk in space and contribute their talents at the International Space Station. Women serve on our country’s Supreme Court, in Congress, and, today, a woman is Vice President of the United States. Yet, girls in certain public schools in North Carolina are required to wear skirts to comply with the outmoded and illogical viewpoint that courteous behavior on the part of both sexes cannot be achieved unless girls wear clothing that reinforces sex stereotypes and signals that girls are not as capable and resilient as boys."

== See also ==
- Barack Obama judicial appointment controversies

Legal offices
Preceded by Charles S. Russell	Justice of the Virginia Supreme Court; 1991–2010	Succeeded by William C. Mims
Preceded by Hiram Emory Widener Jr.	Judge of the United States Court of Appeals for the Fourth Circuit; 2010–2021	Succeeded by Toby J. Heytens
