= Arlington County v. White =

- Court: Supreme Court of Virginia
- Full case name: Arlington County, et al. v. Andrew White, et al.
- Decided: April 21, 2000
- Citation: 259 Va. 708; 528 S.E.2d 706; 2000 Va. LEXIS 71; 24 Employee Benefits Cas. (BNA) 1504

Case history
- Prior actions: Summary judgment granted to plaintiffs, Arlington County Circuit Court

Holding
- The county government exceeded its state-granted power to provide benefits to its employees by expanding the definition of covered dependents to include unmarried partners. Arlington County Circuit Court affirmed.

Court membership
- Chief judge: Harry L. Carrico
- Associate judges: Elizabeth B. Lacy, Leroy Rountree Hassell, Sr., Barbara Milano Keenan, Lawrence L. Koontz, Jr., and Cynthia D. Kinser, Senior Justice Asbury Christian Compton

Case opinions
- Majority: Koontz, joined by Lacy, Keenan, Koontz, Kinser
- Concurrence: Kinser
- Concur/dissent: Hassell, joined by Carrico, Compton

Laws applied
- Va. Code §§ 15.1-1517(A), 51.1-801

Arlington County v. White, 528 S.E.2d 706 (Va. 2000), was a case decided by the Supreme Court of Virginia that prohibited the local government of Arlington County from expanding its employee health insurance benefits beyond spouses or financial dependents. Although the issue was resolved as a question of local government power and statutory interpretation, the ruling was a setback for gay rights activists who had long sought benefits for domestic partners and who were prohibited from marrying under the state constitution. The partial dissent by Justice Leroy Rountree Hassell, Sr. accused the County of using the health care expansion as a disguised attempt to legitimize same sex unions and argued that the state public policy against homosexual unions should have dictated the outcome rather than the narrower statutory interpretation relied upon by the majority.

== Background of the case ==
Counties in Virginia were authorized by state law to provide self-funded health care benefits to county employees and their dependents. However, the two authorizing statutes did not define "dependent" or adopt a definition from elsewhere in the Virginia Code.

In May 1997, the government of Arlington County announced that the definition of eligible dependents under the County's employee health plan would be expanded to include one adult dependent, who could be the employee's spouse, domestic partner, or any other adult who was claimed as a dependent on the employee's federal income tax return. The County listed eight criteria for qualifying adult dependents: someone who "has resided with the employee for a 1 year period; shares with the employee the common necessities of life and basic living expenses; is financially interdependent with the employee; is involved with the employee in a mutually exclusive relationship of support and commitment; is not related by blood to the employee; is not married to anyone; was mentally competent at time of consent to relationship; is 18 years of age or older." Same-sex as well as opposite-sex domestic partners of County employees were subsequently covered by the expanded health care benefits.

On March 12, 1998, Andrew White, Diana White, and Wendell Brown, three residents and taxpayers of Arlington County, filed a complaint in Arlington County Circuit Court for a declaratory judgment that the County had no legal authority to extend benefits to domestic partners, and an injunction against its implementation of the plan. The taxpayers invoked the "Dillon rule", a restrictive interpretation of local government power that was established by the 19th century judge and legal scholar, John Forrest Dillon, and adopted by Virginia as well as many other states. The Dillon rule stated that local governments only had the powers expressly conferred upon them by statute and those necessarily implied; these powers were furthermore to be strictly interpreted. Judge Benjamin N. A. Kendrick agreed with the taxpayers that the County's benefit plan violated the Dillon rule and granted the plaintiffs' motion for summary judgment. The County appealed, and the Virginia Supreme Court affirmed the Circuit Court judgment.

== The court's decision ==
The County argued that because the enabling statutes failed to define "dependent", its authority to interpret the term was necessarily implied under the Dillon rule. The final legal question was then merely whether the County chose a reasonable method of implementing its authority. The court agreed with that analysis but determined that Arlington County's method was unreasonable. A majority of the court voted to strike the benefit extension on that basis alone, while three justices argued that the state's public policy against same-sex unions should have provided the justification.

The court was persuaded by an opinion Virginia Attorney General Richard Cullen had issued in 1997 in response to an inquiry from the Virginia General Assembly. The attorney general did not believe that there was any indication in the statutes of a legislative intent to extend insurance coverage to domestic partners. Based on prior interpretations of the Dillon rule, he concluded that a county would lack the authority to extend coverage. The established definition of "dependent" in the tax context was one who received over half of their financial support from the taxpayer. Only two of the eight criteria put forth by Arlington County even related to finances; one, "financial interdependence", contradicted this definition of "dependent".

Although not all spouses were financial dependents, the court did not consider it unreasonable to assume they would nonetheless be embraced in the definition. It was such a longstanding practice that spouses would be covered under benefit plans that the General Assembly must have contemplated it. Otherwise, the court reasoned that "dependent" must include some kind of financial dependency rather than mere "financial interdependence". Based on its reading of the statutes and the attorney general's opinion, the court accordingly affirmed the circuit court's invalidation of the County's benefit plan.

=== Kinser's concurrence ===
Justice Cynthia D. Kinser, while joining in the majority's opinion, wrote separately to emphasize that the case was not about whether a county had the power to recognize same-sex unions through the extension of benefits, as Justice Leroy Rountree Hassell, Sr. asserted in his dissent/concurrence. Kinser pointed out that the court had not granted review on that issue, but rather on the statutory interpretation and Dillon rule argument by which the majority had resolved the case. Although she asserted that she did not support same-sex unions or question that they contravened Virginia public policy, she believed that the dissent's rationale would cause the court to question other sections of Virginia law that incidentally conferred benefits upon those involved in same-sex unions as "disguised efforts" to legitimize those unions. This included a state tax provision that allowed Virginia taxpayers to claim a deduction for the same category of dependents as recognized under federal revenue laws, which, though narrower than the Arlington County definition, was still broad enough to cover financially dependent same-sex partners.

=== Hassel's dissent/concurrence ===
Justice Hassel, joined by two other justices, concurred in the court's judgment, but dissented because he believed that the issue of the case was whether a county could recognize same-sex unions by bestowing benefits upon those engaged in such relationships. Hassel asserted that the court had "a duty, as well as an obligation, to decide issues of great importance to the citizens of this Commonwealth when, as here, those issues are properly presented to this Court."

Hassel agreed that the benefit plan violated the Dillon Rule. However, he also thought it was an impermissible regulation of domestic relations—a domain that was solely the General Assembly's to legislate—because the county's criteria for dependent benefits were tacitly directed at extending benefits to same-sex partners. The failure to confront this issue meant that Arlington County could make its benefit plan conform to the majority's decision with little change, thus requiring another costly legal challenge.
