= LeRoy F. Millette Jr. =

American judge

LeRoy Millette

Justice of the Supreme Court of Virginia
- In office August 19, 2008 – July 31, 2015
- Appointed by: Tim Kaine
- Preceded by: G. Steven Agee
- Succeeded by: Jane Marum Roush

Judge of the Virginia Court of Appeals
- In office November 26, 2007 – August 19, 2008
- Appointed by: Tim Kaine
- Preceded by: James Benton
- Succeeded by: Cleo E. Powell

Personal details
- Born: LeRoy Francis Millette Jr. July 30, 1949 (age 76) Lewistown, Pennsylvania, U.S.
- Spouse: Mary O'Brien
- Education: College of William and Mary (BA, JD)

LeRoy Francis Millette Jr. (born July 30, 1949) is a senior justice of the Supreme Court of Virginia. Millette was appointed to the Court by Virginia Governor Tim Kaine to fill a vacancy created by the retirement of Justice G. Steven Agee, who had been appointed to the federal 4th Circuit Court of Appeals. On February 11, 2009, Millette was confirmed for a full 12-year term by the Virginia General Assembly beginning retroactive to February 1, 2009. He entered senior service in 2015. Millette previously served for less than one year on the Court of Appeals of Virginia, also having been appointed by Governor Kaine and then being subsequently confirmed by the General Assembly. Prior to that, he served as a judge of the Circuit Court of Prince William County, Virginia, in which position he presided over the capital murder trial of John Allen Muhammad, the infamous Beltway Sniper. Millette confirmed the jury's sentence of death of Muhammad. Millette also was involved in some of the proceedings of the Lorena Bobbitt trial in 1993. Prior to serving on the Circuit Court, he was a general district court judge, making him one of only three Virginia jurists, along with Justice Lawrence L. Koontz Jr. and Justice Barbara Milano Keenan, to have served at all four levels of courts in Virginia. He received his undergraduate degree from the College of William and Mary and his Juris Doctor degree from the Marshall–Wythe School of Law at William and Mary. Millette is married to M. Elizabeth O’Brien Millette and they have two children, Lauren Elizabeth Millette and LeRoy F. Millette III.

Governor Kaine appointed Chesterfield Circuit Court Judge Cleo E. Powell to fill Millette's seat on the Court of Appeals. Millette was sworn in as a Supreme Court Justice on September 5, 2008.
