= D. Arthur Kelsey =

American judge (born 1961)

Arthur Kelsey
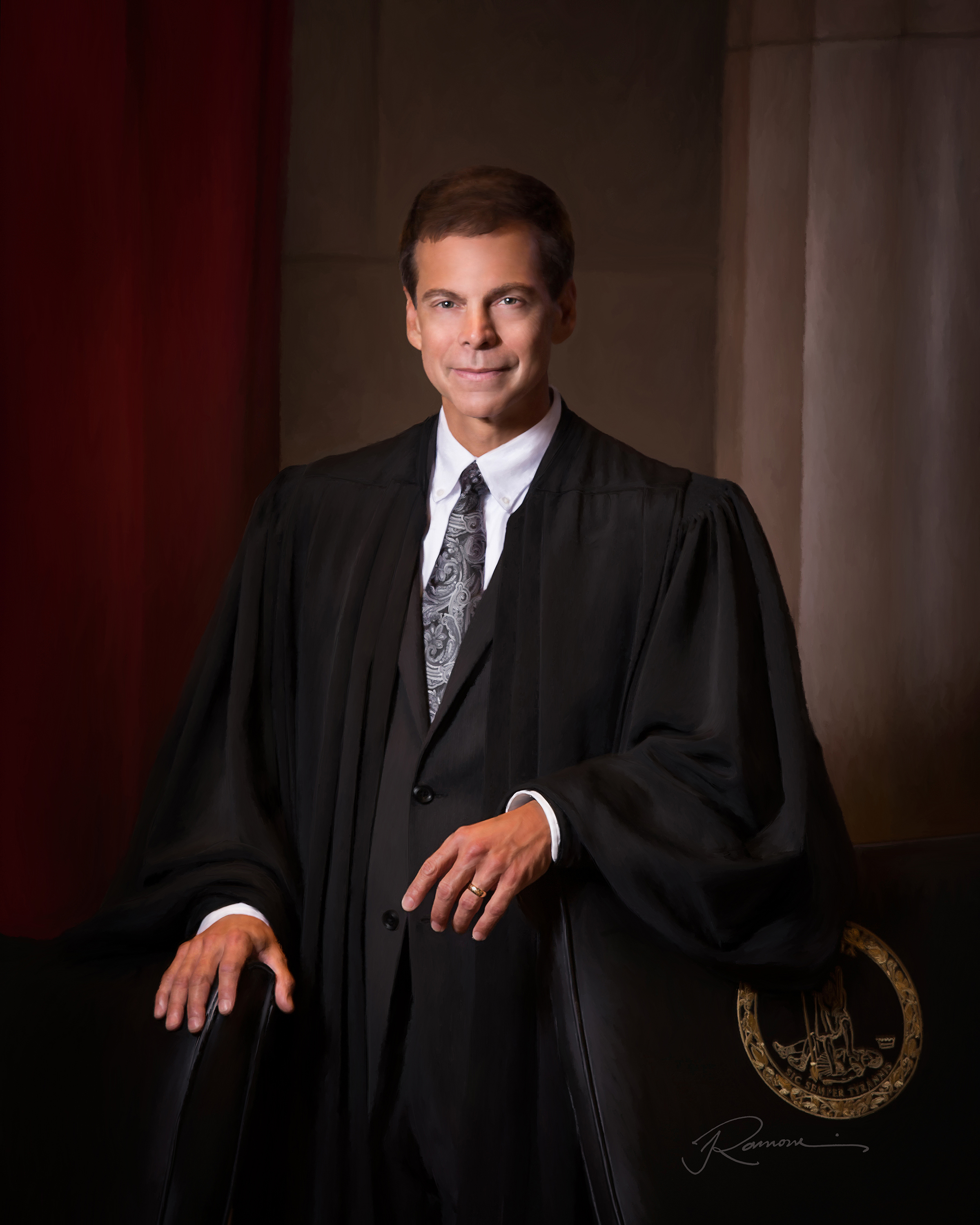

Justice of the Supreme Court of Virginia
- Incumbent
- Assumed office February 1, 2015
- Preceded by: Cynthia D. Kinser

Judge of the Virginia Court of Appeals
- In office August 30, 2002 – February 1, 2015
- Appointed by: Mark Warner
- Preceded by: Robert Bray
- Succeeded by: Richard Y. Atlee, Jr.

Personal details
- Born: Denham Arthur Kelsey; October 9, 1961 (age 64) Norfolk, Virginia, U.S.
- Education: Old Dominion University (BA); College of William and Mary (JD)

Denham Arthur Kelsey (born October 9, 1961) is an American lawyer and justice of the Supreme Court of Virginia. His twelve-year term on the Supreme Court began on February 1, 2015. Kelsey was previously an appellate judge on the Court of Appeals of Virginia and a trial court judge in the Fifth Judicial Circuit of Virginia.

== Early life ==
Kelsey was born in Norfolk, Virginia. He graduated magna cum laude from Old Dominion University in 1982 and obtained his Juris Doctor degree from the College of William & Mary Law School in 1985, as a member of the Order of the Coif. He then clerked for the Honorable John Ashton MacKenzie, United States District Judge for the Eastern District of Virginia.

== Career ==
After several years in private practice, including as a litigation partner at Hunton & Williams, Kelsey was elected to be a circuit judge for the Fifth Judicial Circuit of Virginia, based in Suffolk, in 2000. He was appointed by Governor Mark R. Warner to the Virginia Court of Appeals in August 2002. He was subsequently elected by the General Assembly for an eight-year term in 2003 and re-elected in 2011. The General Assembly unanimously elected Kelsey to the Supreme Court on January 20, 2015, for a twelve-year term beginning the following February 1.

Kelsey has served as an adjunct professor at the Marshall-Wythe School of Law, College of William & Mary, Regent University School of Law, and Appalachian School of Law. His most recent publication is "The Timeless Foundations of the Rule of Law" (75 Virginia Lawyer 3, at 32-37 (2026)).

In 2023, Kelsey was elected to the American Law Institute, a leading independent organization in the United States that publishes Restatements of the Law and other scholarly works to clarify, modernize, and improve American law. He also serves on the Steering Committee of the Boyd-Graves Conference, a similar organization that focuses specifically on Virginia law.

On May 8th, 2026, Kelsey wrote the majority opinion for the case Scott v. McDougle, which held, in a 4-3 vote, that the process of 2026 Virginia redistricting amendment is unconstitutional and thus the adopted congressional districts were nullified. The case drew significant controversies and received praise from Republicans while being heavily criticized by Democrats.

== Select publications ==
=== Journal articles ===
- "Toxic & Environmental Torts Within Admiralty," Tulane Law Review, vol. 62 (1988), p. 405.
- "In Rem Liens & Ship Repair Contracts" in Shipping Finance Annual. London: Euromoney PLC 1996, pp. 177–179.
- "Mistaken LHWCA Compensation Payments: Subrogation Lien Or Third Party Credit?" Journal of Maritime Law and Commerce vol. 30, no. 19 (1999).
- "Law & Politics: The Imperative of Judicial Self-Restraint," VBA Journal, vol 28, no. 6, (Sept. 2002), pp. 6–9.
- "Law & Equity in Virginia" VBA Journal, vol. 28, no. 8 (Dec. 2002), pp. 6–10.
- "Social Compact as Law: The Workers’ Compensation Act and the Wicked Sisters of the Common Law," VBA Journal, vol. 31, no. 5 (Oct./Nov. 2005), pp. 13-21.
- "The Architecture of Judicial Power: Appellate Review & Stare Decisis," The Judges' Journal, vol. 45, no. 2 (2006), pp. 6–13.
- "Virginia’s Answer To Daubert’s Question Behind The Question," Judicature, vol. 90, no. 2 (2006), pp. 68–71.
- "Procedural Defaults In Virginia Trial Courts: The Adversarial Model and the Imperative of Neutrality," Virginia Lawyer, vol 55, no. 3 (Oct. 2006), p. 38
- "The Thing Decided: Rule 1:6’s Rediscovery of Res Judicata in Virginia," VBA Journal, vol 34, no. 2 (June/July 2008), pp. 18–21, 26.
- "The Resurgent Role of Legal History in Modern U.S. Supreme Court Cases," VBA Journal, vol 37, no. 3 (Fall 2010), p. 10.
- "Procedural Defaults: Balancing Systemic and Individual Justice," VTLA Appellate Journal, vol. 1 (2012), pp. 1–22.
- "The Commonwealth’s Common Law," VBA Journal, vol. 40, no. 26 (Winter 2013–14)
- "The Laws of Physics and the Physics of Laws," Virginia Lawyer, vol. 62, no. 9 (2014) p. 30 (abridged version) and Regent Law Review vol. 25 (2012), p. 89 (unabridged version).
- "Bracton’s Warning and Hamilton’s Reassurance," The Journal of Appellate Practice and Process, vol. 22 (2022) pp. 263–82.
- "The Timeless Foundations of the Rule of Law," The Virginia Lawyer, vol. 75, no. 3 (Fall 2026), pp. 32-37.

=== Book chapters ===
- Antitrust Law Developments, 4th ed. ABA Section of Antitrust Law, 1997.
- Chapter 3. The Virginia Lawyer: A Deskbook for Practitioners. Charlottesville: Lexis Law Publishing, 1998.
- "Civil Discovery in Virginia" in Judicial Supervision & Enforcement. Harrisonburg: CLE Publications, 2017.
- "Appellate Practice" in Appellate Practice in the Supreme Court of Virginia. Harrisonburg: CLE Publications. 2023.

=== Journal editor ===
- American Maritime Cases, associate editor 1999–2000.

Legal offices
Preceded by Cynthia D. Kinser	Justice of the Supreme Court of Virginia; 2015–present	Incumbent
