= Walter S. Felton Jr. =

American lawyer (1944–2022)

Chief Judge of the Virginia Court of Appeals
- In office April 1, 2006 – December 31, 2014
- Preceded by: Johanna L. Fitzpatrick
- Succeeded by: Glen A. Huff

Judge of the Virginia Court of Appeals
- In office September 1, 2002 – December 31, 2014
- Preceded by: Jere M. H. Willis Jr.
- Succeeded by: Mary Grace O'Brien

Counsel to the Governor of Virginia
- In office January 17, 1998 – January 12, 2002
- Governor: Jim Gilmore
- Preceded by: Mark Christie
- Succeeded by: Robert Blue

Personal details
- Born: Walter Shepard Felton Jr. July 28, 1944 Suffolk, Virginia, U.S.
- Died: April 29, 2022 (aged 77)
- Party: Republican
- Education: University of Richmond

Military service
- Allegiance: United States
- Branch/service: United States Army
- Years of service: 1969–1973
- Unit: J.A.G. Corps
- Battles/wars: Vietnam War

Walter Shepard Felton Jr. (July 28, 1944 – April 29, 2022) was the Chief Judge of the Court of Appeals of Virginia. He graduated from the University of Richmond in 1966 and the University of Richmond School of Law in 1969. Felton previously served as Deputy Attorney General of Virginia and law professor at the Marshall-Wythe School of Law.

Felton retired from the Court on December 31, 2014, assuming senior status upon his retirement.

Judge Felton died on April 29, 2022.
