= Junius P. Fulton III =

American judge (born 1958)

Junius Fulton
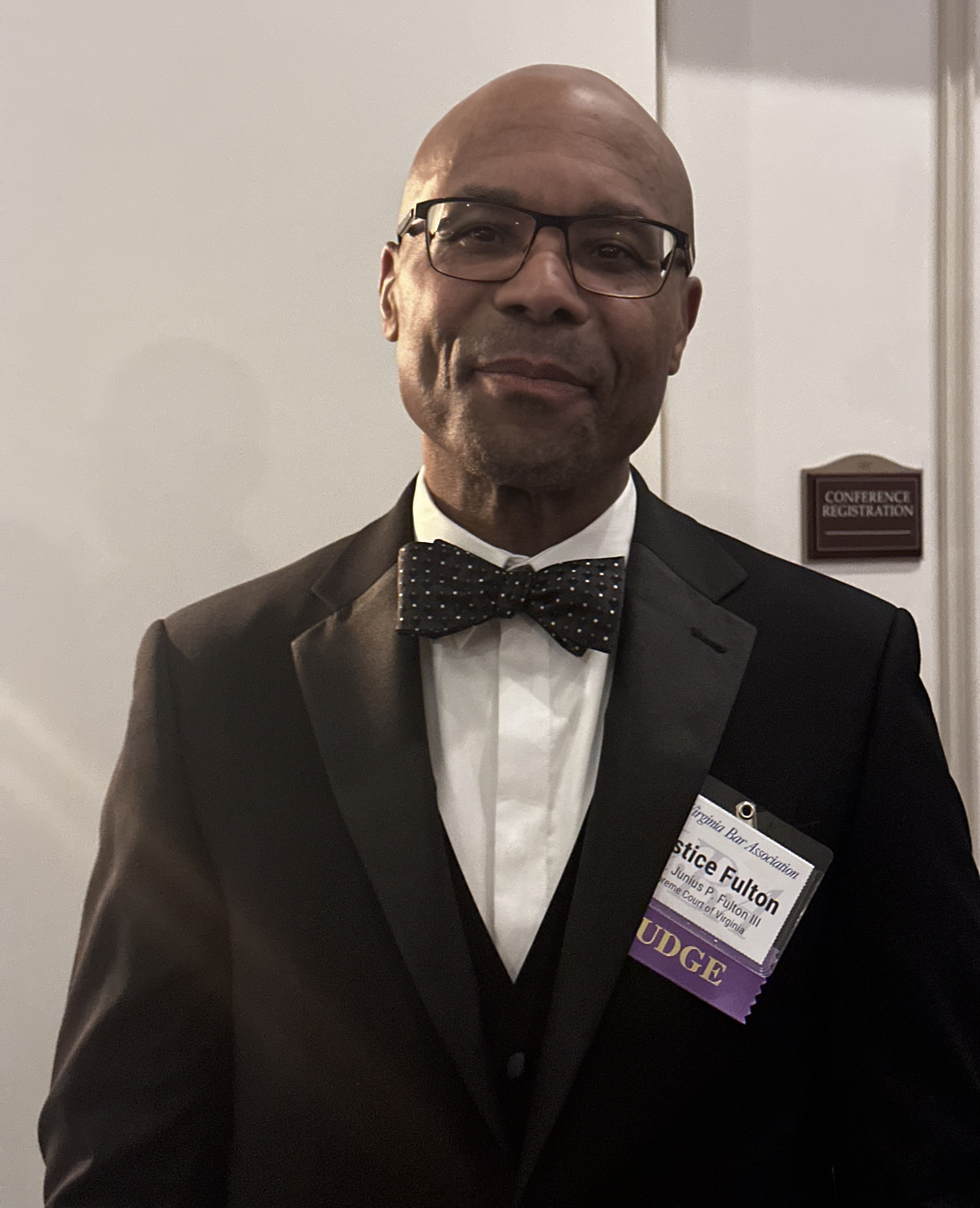

Justice of the Virginia Supreme Court
- Incumbent
- Assumed office January 1, 2026
- Preceded by: S. Bernard Goodwyn

Judge of the Virginia Court of Appeals
- In office September 1, 2021 – December 31, 2025
- Preceded by: Seat established
- Succeeded by: Kevin Duffan

Personal details
- Born: 1958 (age 67–68) Norfolk, Virginia, U.S.
- Education: University of Virginia (BA); College of William and Mary (JD)

Junius P. Fulton III (born 1958) is a justice of the Supreme Court of Virginia.

== Early life ==
Junius P. Fulton III was born in 1958 in Norfolk, Virginia. Fulton's interest in law began when he was a child, with a love of anything related to law (including the TV show Perry Mason), but was most affected by the murder of his father, Junius Jr., on October 18, 1967, and the ensuing trial.

Fulton graduated with his B.A. from the University of Virginia in 1981, and received his J.D. from William & Mary Law School in 1985.

== Career ==
Fulton began his career in 1985 as a defense attorney, before serving as an assistant commonwealth's attorney in Norfolk from 1986 to 1989. After that, he returned to private practice until his 1996 appointment to the Norfolk Circuit Court (Fourth Judicial Circuit of Virginia) by Governor George Allen, an appointment which was confirmed by the Virginia General Assembly in 1997.

In 2021, the General Assembly elevated Fulton to serve on a newly created seat of the Court of Appeals of Virginia. In 2025, he was appointed to the Virginia Supreme Court by the General Assembly to replace S. Bernard Goodwyn, who retired from active service on December 31, 2025.

Legal offices
Preceded by S. Bernard Goodwyn	Justice of the Virginia Supreme Court; 2026–present	Incumbent
