= Donald W. Lemons =

American judge

Donald Lemons

26th Chief Justice of Virginia
- In office January 1, 2015 – December 31, 2021
- Preceded by: Cynthia D. Kinser
- Succeeded by: S. Bernard Goodwyn

Justice of the Virginia Supreme Court
- In office March 16, 2000 – February 1, 2022
- Preceded by: Christian Compton
- Succeeded by: Wesley G. Russell Jr.

Personal details
- Born: Donald Wayne Lemons; February 22, 1949 (age 77) Washington, D.C., U.S.
- Spouse: Carol Lemons
- Education: University of Virginia (BA, JD)

Donald Wayne Lemons (born February 22, 1949) is a former associate justice of the Supreme Court of Virginia. He served as chief justice from 2015 to 2021. He received both his undergraduate and law degrees from the University of Virginia.

== Biography ==
Lemons was assistant dean and assistant professor of law of the University of Virginia School of Law from 1976 to 1978. He then entered the private practice. Lemons first served as a judge of the Circuit Court of the City of Richmond, having been appointed to that position by Governor George Allen in 1995 while the legislature was out of session. He was subsequently confirmed for a full term by the General Assembly.

In 1998, Lemons was elected by the General Assembly to an eight-year term on the Court of Appeals of Virginia. Lemons succeeded Judge Joseph E. Baker, one of the original members of the Court of Appeals. Upon the retirement of justice A. Christian Compton in 2000, Lemons was elected by the General Assembly to fill the vacancy on the high court. Robert J. Humphreys was elected to fill the vacancy on the Court of Appeals created by Lemons' elevation to the Supreme Court.

Lemons was elected by the Court to his first four-year term as chief justice beginning on January 1, 2015 and he was re-elected by the court to a second term as chief justice beginning January 1, 2019, and he stepped down from the role on December 31, 2021. He retired from the court on February 1, 2022.

From 1998 to 2000, Lemons was the A.L. Philpott Distinguished Adjunct Professor of Law at the University of Richmond's law school. From 2000 to 2008, he was John Marshall Professor of Judicial Studies at the law school. Since 2008, he has been the Distinguished Professor of Judicial Studies at the Washington and Lee University School of Law in Lexington, Virginia.

Lemons was frequently mentioned as a likely candidate for appointment to the United States Court of Appeals for the Fourth Circuit. On June 13, 2007, Virginia Senators Jim Webb and John Warner announced that they had recommended Lemons, along with four other candidates, to President George W. Bush for nomination to the Court. The nomination, however, was given to Lemons's colleague, then justice G. Steven Agee, who was ultimately confirmed by the Senate. Lemons did not actively seek a nomination for another vacancy on the Fourth Circuit that was filled by President Barack Obama.

Legal offices
Preceded by Christian Compton	Justice of the Virginia Supreme Court; 2000–2022	Succeeded by Wesley G. Russell Jr.
Preceded by Cynthia D. Kinser	Chief Justice of the Virginia Supreme Court; 2015–2021	Succeeded by S. Bernard Goodwyn
