= Stephen R. McCullough =

American judge (born 1972)

Stephen McCullough
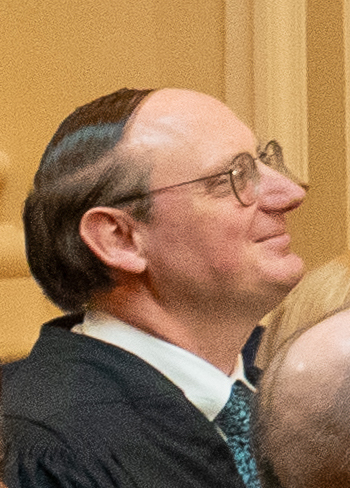

Justice of the Supreme Court of Virginia
- Incumbent
- Assumed office May 23, 2016
- Preceded by: Jane Marum Roush

Judge of the Virginia Court of Appeals
- In office August 1, 2011 – March 3, 2016
- Preceded by: Elizabeth A. McClanahan
- Succeeded by: Mary B. Malveaux

Personal details
- Born: Stephen Richard McCullough; February 15, 1972 (age 54) Marseille, France
- Education: University of Virginia (BA); University of Richmond (JD)

Stephen Richard McCullough (born February 15, 1972) is an American jurist who has served as a justice of the Supreme Court of Virginia since 2016. He previously served as a judge of the Court of Appeals of Virginia and held several positions in the Virginia Office of the Attorney General, including solicitor general.

== Early life and education ==
McCullough was born in Marseille, France, in 1972. He graduated from the University of Virginia in 1994 and obtained his Juris Doctor degree from the University of Richmond T.C. Williams School of Law in 1997. After completing law school, he served as a law clerk to state Supreme Court Justice Leroy R. Hassell Sr.

== Career ==
=== Legal career ===
In 1999, McCullough joined the Virginia Office of the Attorney General, working in its criminal litigation section. He served as an assistant attorney general from 1999 to 2005 and became deputy solicitor general in 2006. He held that position until 2007, when he participated in the United States Supreme Court Fellows program through the National Association of Attorneys General.

McCullough served as Virginia's solicitor general from 2008 to 2009. In this role, he worked on appellate litigation involving the Commonwealth. From 2010 to 2011, he served as opinions counsel and senior appellate counsel in the attorney general's office. His legal practice included litigation before Virginia's appellate courts, the United States Court of Appeals for the Fourth Circuit, and the United States Supreme Court. He also taught appellate advocacy as an adjunct at the University of Richmond School of Law.

=== Judicial career ===
==== Court of Appeals of Virginia ====
On July 29, 2011, the Virginia General Assembly elected McCullough to an eight-year term on the Court of Appeals of Virginia. He took office on August 1, 2011, filling the vacancy created when Elizabeth A. McClanahan was elected to the Supreme Court of Virginia. He served on the Court of Appeals until 2016.

==== Supreme Court of Virginia ====
On March 10, 2016, the Virginia General Assembly elected McCullough to the Supreme Court of Virginia for a 12-year term beginning March 3, 2016. He succeeded Jane Marum Roush. His formal investiture took place on May 23, 2016.

As a justice, McCullough participates in the court's review of appeals involving questions of state law, statutory interpretation, constitutional issues, and other matters within its jurisdiction.

=== Committee and Bar Service ===
Since, 2022, McCullough as served as the Co-Chair of the Virginia Access to Justice Commission. The Access to Justice Commission works to improve access to justice for persons who cannot afford a lawyer.

McCullough has chaired the Virginia Model Jury Instructions Committee since 2013. That Committee develops and updates the standard instructions for Virginia Juries.

In other areas of service, McCullough has participated in the Boyd Graves Conference, the Evidence Committee, the Administration Committee, the Advisory Committee on Rules of Court, the Appellate Council of the Virginia Bar Association, and the Board of Governors of the Virginia Bar Association.

== Publications ==
McCullough authored a treatise, Virginia Constitutional Law, published by Lexis. It is an article by article analysis of the Virginia Constitution. He has also authored a number of law review articles addressing aspects of the Virginia Constitution. For example, in A Vanishing Virginia Constitution, 46 U. Rich. L. Rev. 347 (2011), McCullough wrote about the need to interpret the Constitution on its own terms, as opposed to adopting interpretations of equivalent provisions in the Federal Constitution, as construed by the United States Supreme Court. McCullough has contributed to legal reference works on appellate practice. He authored a chapter and co-authored another in Appellate Practice—Virginia and Federal Courts, published by Virginia Continuing Legal Education. The work addresses appellate procedure and practice in state and federal courts.

== Awards ==
He was awarded “Champion of Justice” award in 017 by Legal Aid Works. He was twice recognized as the volunteer of the year for the Fredericksburg Boys and Girls Club. In 2023, he was awarded with Hill Tucker Public Service Award from the Richmond Bar Association. He has also received two “Best Brief” awards from the National Association of Attorneys General for briefs he authored in the United States Supreme Court.

Legal offices
Preceded by Jane Marum Roush	Justice of the Supreme Court of Virginia; 2016–present	Incumbent
