= Teresa M. Chafin =

American judge (born 1955)

Teresa Chafin

Justice of the Supreme Court of Virginia
- Incumbent
- Assumed office September 1, 2019
- Appointed by: Virginia General Assembly
- Preceded by: Elizabeth A. McClanahan

Judge of the Virginia Court of Appeals
- In office March 1, 2009 – September 1, 2019
- Preceded by: James Haley
- Succeeded by: Clay Athey

Personal details
- Born: Teresa Marlene Chafin; October 4, 1955 (age 70) Lebanon, Virginia, U.S.
- Relatives: Ben Chafin (brother)
- Education: Emory & Henry College (BA); University of Richmond (JD)

Teresa Marlene Chafin (born October 4, 1955) is a justice of the Supreme Court of Virginia.

== Education ==
Chafin is a native of Russell County and the sister of the late state senator Ben Chafin. She received her undergraduate degree from Emory and Henry College and her Juris Doctor from the University of Richmond School of Law in 1987 and was admitted to the practice of law in 1988.

== Judicial career ==
=== State court service ===
She was sworn in on June 18, 2012. Prior to her service on the appellate court, Chafin had a private practice based in Lebanon, and sat as Circuit Court judge, primarily in Tazewell County, Virginia from 2005 until 2012, including service as the chief judge of the 29th Circuit in 2008 and 2009. From 2002 until 2005, Judge Chafin served as Tazewell County's Juvenile & Domestic Relations District Court judge. She left office on September 1, 2019, upon her elevation to the Supreme Court of Virginia.

=== Supreme Court of Virginia ===
On February 14, 2019, she was unanimously elected by the Virginia General Assembly to be a justice of the Supreme Court of Virginia, replacing Elizabeth A. McClanahan who retired on September 1, 2019.

Legal offices
Preceded by Elizabeth A. McClanahan	Justice of the Supreme Court of Virginia; 2019–present	Incumbent
