= Marvin Frederick Cole =

American judge (1922–2005)

Judge of the Court of Appeals of Virginia
- In office April 16, 1985 – April 30, 1991

Personal details
- Born: January 6, 1922; Buckingham County, Virginia, U.S.
- Died: August 20, 2005 (aged 83); Richmond, Virginia, U.S.
- Education: University of Richmond (BA, LLB)
- Occupation: Judge

Military service
- Allegiance: United States
- Branch/service: United States Navy
- Battles/wars: World War II

Marvin Frederick Cole (January 6, 1922 – August 20, 2005) was an American jurist from Virginia. After earning a bachelor's degree from the University of Richmond in 1943, he joined the United States Navy. As a communications officer stationed in Hawaii, he helped a joint congressional committee investigate the Japanese attack on Pearl Harbor. After the war, he entered the University of Richmond's T.C. Williams School of Law, graduating in 1948. He practiced law with two firms before becoming a partner in his own firm in 1969, where he remained until joining Richmond Circuit Court. Judge Cole was a member of the Virginia State Bar for more than 50 years and was a former president of the Richmond Trial Lawyers Association. He also served as a judge for national moot court trials, the YMCA's mock-trial program and for trial tactics courses at the University of Richmond. In 1985, following the death of Chief Judge E. Ballard Baker, Judge Cole was appointed to the Court of Appeals of Virginia. He retired from active service in 1991, but continued to sit as a Senior Judge for another nine years.
