= E. Ballard Baker =

American judge

E. Ballard Baker (October 25, 1917 – March 1985) was a Virginia jurist who served briefly as the first Chief Judge of the newly created Court of Appeals of Virginia before his death in 1985. He was succeeded as Chief Judge by Lawrence L. Koontz, Jr. and the vacancy on the Court created by his death was filled by Judge Marvin Frederick Cole.
