= Wesley G. Russell Jr. =

American judge (born 1970)

Wesley Russell
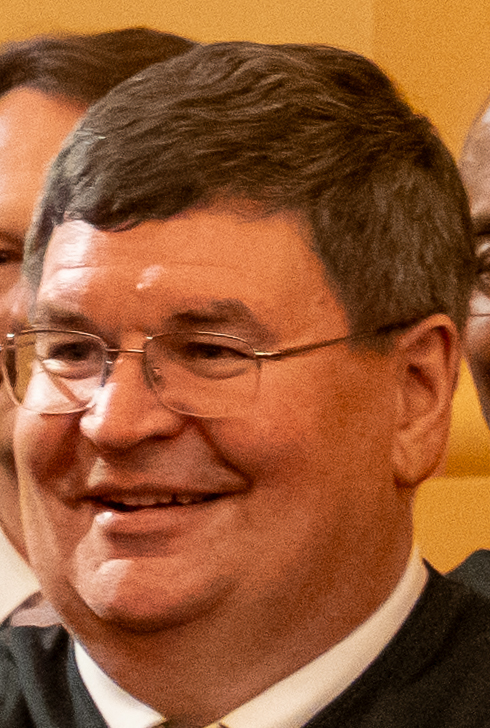

Justice of the Supreme Court of Virginia
- Incumbent
- Assumed office July 1, 2022
- Preceded by: Donald W. Lemons

Judge of the Virginia Court of Appeals
- In office February 1, 2015 – July 1, 2022
- Succeeded by: Kimberley White

Personal details
- Born: Wesley Glenn Russell Jr. 1970 (age 55–56) Hampton, Virginia, U.S.
- Education: University of Virginia (BA); George Mason University (JD)

Wesley Glenn Russell Jr. (born 1970) is a justice of the Supreme Court of Virginia and former judge of the Court of Appeals of Virginia.

== Life and education ==
Russell was born in 1970 in Hampton, Virginia and received his Bachelor of Arts from the University of Virginia and his Juris Doctor from George Mason University School of Law (now Antonin Scalia Law School).

== Career ==
Prior to joining the court, Russell was the deputy attorney general for civil litigation for the Commonwealth of Virginia. He was also a partner at the law firm of McSweeney, Crump, Childress & Timple PC. He started his career as a law clerk for the Virginia 13th Judicial Circuit.

=== Virginia Court of Appeals ===
Russell was first elected by the General Assembly on March 10, 2006, to an eight-year term beginning January 20, 2014. His eight-year term began February 1, 2015. His term would have expired on January 31, 2023, however, he was elected to the Virginia Supreme Court.

=== Supreme Court of Virginia ===
On June 17, 2022, Russell was elected by the Virginia General Assembly to a 12-year term on the Supreme Court of Virginia beginning July 1, 2022.

Legal offices
| Preceded by Donald W. Lemons | Justice of the Supreme Court of Virginia; 2022–present | Incumbent |
