= William Petty (disambiguation) =

William Petty (1623–1687) was an English economist, scientist and philosopher.

William Petty may also refer to:

- William Petty, 2nd Earl of Shelburne (1737–1805), great-grandson of William Petty, and Prime Minister from 1782–83
- William Petty-FitzMaurice, Earl of Kerry (1811–1836), grandson of the Prime Minister
- William G. Petty (born 1949), judge of the Virginia Court of Appeals

== Similar names ==
- William Petyt (1641–1707) English Whig lawyer and writer.
- William Petit (born 1956), American former physician and politician.
