= Clay Athey =

American politician and jurist

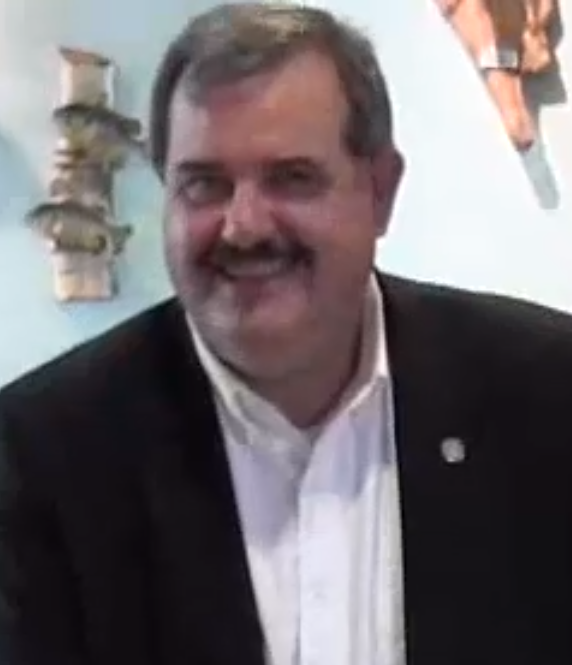

Judge of the Virginia Court of Appeals
- Incumbent
- Assumed office February 16, 2019
- Appointed by: Virginia General Assembly
- Preceded by: Teresa M. Chafin

Member of the Virginia House of Delegates from the 18th district
- In office January 9, 2002 – January 11, 2012
- Preceded by: Creigh Deeds
- Succeeded by: Michael Webert

Personal details
- Born: Clifford Lynwood Athey Jr. September 1, 1960 (age 66) Front Royal, Virginia, U.S.
- Party: Republican
- Education: Lord Fairfax Community College (AA); Virginia Commonwealth University (BA); University of Dayton (JD)
- Profession: Lawyer

Clifford Lynwood "Clay" Athey Jr. (born September 1, 1960) is an American politician and jurist. He served as a member of the Virginia House of Delegates from 2002 to 2012. He has served as a judge of the Virginia Court of Appeals since 2019.

== Early life and education ==
Athey was born in 1960 in Front Royal, Virginia. He graduated from Warren County High School in 1978. He received an Associate of Arts in business administration from Lord Fairfax Community College in 1988, a Bachelor of Arts in history from Virginia Commonwealth University in 1990 and a Juris Doctor from the University of Dayton School of Law in 1993.

== Career ==
=== Virginia House of Delegates ===
Athey is a former Republican member of the Virginia House of Delegates 2002–2011. During his 10 years in the House of Delegates, he represented the 18th district, made up of Warren County and parts of Fauquier and Frederick Counties.

=== State court service ===
In 2012, Governor Bob McDonnell appointed him a judge of the 26th Judicial Circuit, covering Clarke, Frederick, Page, Rockingham, Shenandoah and Warren counties and the cities of Harrisonburg and Winchester in the northern part of the state.

=== Appointment to Virginia Court of Appeals ===
On February 16, 2019, he was appointed by the Virginia General Assembly for a seat on the Virginia Court of Appeals vacated by Teresa M. Chafin, who was appointed to the Virginia Supreme Court.

== Personal life ==
Athey is married to Stacey Lynne Knox and has two children, Madagan and Clayton.
