= Elizabeth A. McClanahan =

American judge (born 1959)

Dean of the Appalachian School of Law
- In office September 2, 2019 – July 1, 2021
- Preceded by: Sandra McGlothlin
- Succeeded by: B. Keith Faulkner

Justice of the Supreme Court of Virginia
- In office August 1, 2011 – September 1, 2019
- Appointed by: Virginia General Assembly
- Preceded by: Lawrence L. Koontz Jr.
- Succeeded by: Teresa M. Chafin

Judge of the Virginia Court of Appeals
- In office April 1, 2003 – July 31, 2011
- Preceded by: G. Steven Agee
- Succeeded by: Stephen R. McCullough

Personal details
- Born: Elizabeth Ann McClanahan; September 1, 1959 (age 67) Buchanan County, Virginia, U.S.
- Education: College of William & Mary; University of Dayton

Elizabeth Ann McClanahan (born September 1, 1959) is a former Justice of the Supreme Court of Virginia. She was sworn in on September 1, 2011, for a term ending in 2023. In January 2019, she announced that she would retire from the Court effective September 1 of that year.

Born in Buchanan County, Virginia, she received an undergraduate degree in government and sociology from the College of William and Mary (1981) and her J.D. degree from the University of Dayton (1984). She formerly chaired the State Council of Higher Education and served as vice rector of the College of William and Mary. She formerly partnered with a law firm called Penn, Stuart, and Eskridge and served for more than eight years on the Virginia Court of Appeals as a Judge. She is a breast cancer survivor.

She became President and Dean of the Appalachian School of Law on September 2, 2019. She departed from this role, and is currently CEO of the Virginia Tech Foundation as of June 1, 2021. She is also currently a part of the McCammon Group as a mediator of legal disputes.

During her time on the Virginia Court of Appeals, she was honored in the 2011 list of "Influential Women of Virginia" by Virginia Lawyers Media. In 2021, she was recognized by Virginia Business in "Virginia 500: The 2021 Power List" in the Nonprofits/Philanthropy section.

Legal offices
Preceded by Lawrence L. Koontz Jr.	Justice of the Supreme Court of Virginia; 2011–2019	Succeeded by Teresa M. Chafin
