= John Forrest Dillon =

American judge (1831–1914)

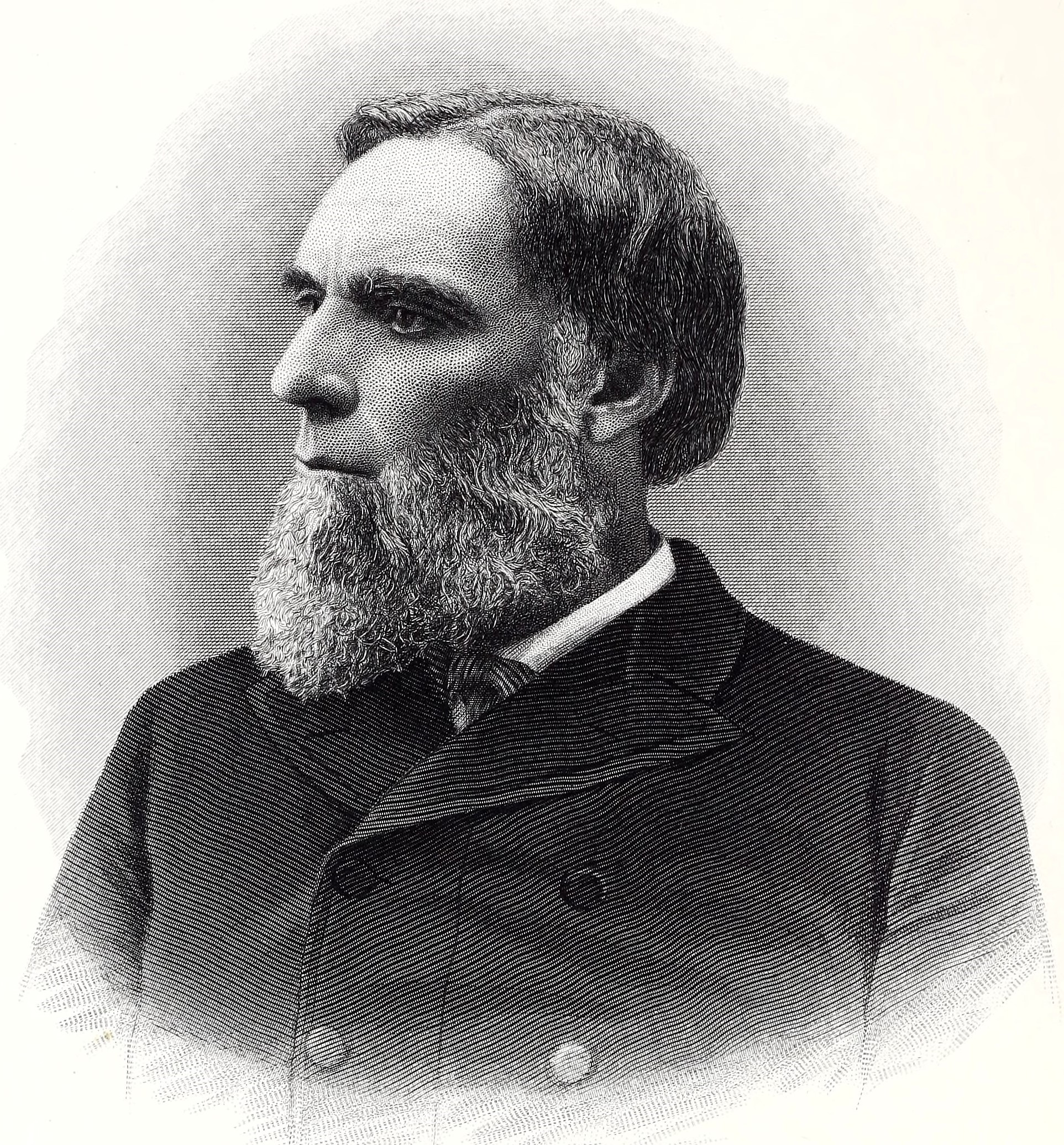

Judge of the United States Circuit Court for the Eighth Circuit
- In office December 22, 1869 – September 1, 1879
- Appointed by: Ulysses S. Grant
- Preceded by: Seat established by 16 Stat. 44
- Succeeded by: George W. McCrary

10th Chief Justice of the Iowa Supreme Court
- In office 1868–1869
- Preceded by: Ralph P. Lowe
- Succeeded by: Chester C. Cole

Associate Justice of the Iowa Supreme Court
- In office 1864–1870

Personal details
- Born: John Forrest Dillon; December 25, 1831 Northampton, Montgomery County, New York (now Northampton, Fulton County, New York), U.S.
- Died: May 6, 1914 (aged 82) New York City, U.S.
- Education: University of Iowa (MD) read law

John Forrest Dillon (December 25, 1831 – May 6, 1914) was an American attorney in Iowa and New York, a justice of the Iowa Supreme Court and a United States circuit judge of the United States Circuit Court for the Eighth Circuit. He authored a highly influential treatise on the power of states over municipal governments.

== Education and career ==
Born on December 25, 1831, in Northampton, (then part of Montgomery County, now part of Fulton County), New York, Dillon received a Doctor of Medicine in 1850 from the University of Iowa. He read law in 1852. He entered private practice in Davenport, Iowa from 1852 to 1853. He was county attorney for Scott County, Iowa from 1853 to 1858. He was a Judge of the Iowa District Court for the Seventh Judicial District from 1858 to 1862. He was a justice of the Iowa Supreme Court from 1862 to 1868.

== Federal judicial service ==
Dillon was nominated by President Ulysses S. Grant on December 9, 1869, to the United States Circuit Court for the Eighth Circuit, to a new seat authorized by 16 Stat. 44. He was confirmed by the United States Senate on December 22, 1869, and received his commission the same day. His service terminated on September 1, 1879, due to his resignation.

=== Scholarship and notable ruling ===
While on the federal bench, Dillon wrote Municipal Corporations (1872), one of the earliest systematic studies of the subject. He also authored Removal of Cases from State Courts to Federal Courts and Municipal Bonds, both in 1876. On February 17, 1876, during the Whiskey Ring graft prosecutions, Justice Dillon ruled Ulysses S. Grant's deposition for Orville E. Babcock was admissible in court.

== Later career ==
Following his resignation from the federal bench, Dillon was a professor of law for Columbia University from 1879 to 1882. He resumed private practice in New York City, New York from 1882 to 1914. He was the Storrs professor of law at Yale University from 1891 to 1892, during which time he wrote The Laws and Jurisprudence of England and America: Being a Series of Lectures Delivered Before Yale University. He died on May 6, 1914, in New York City.

== Memorial ==
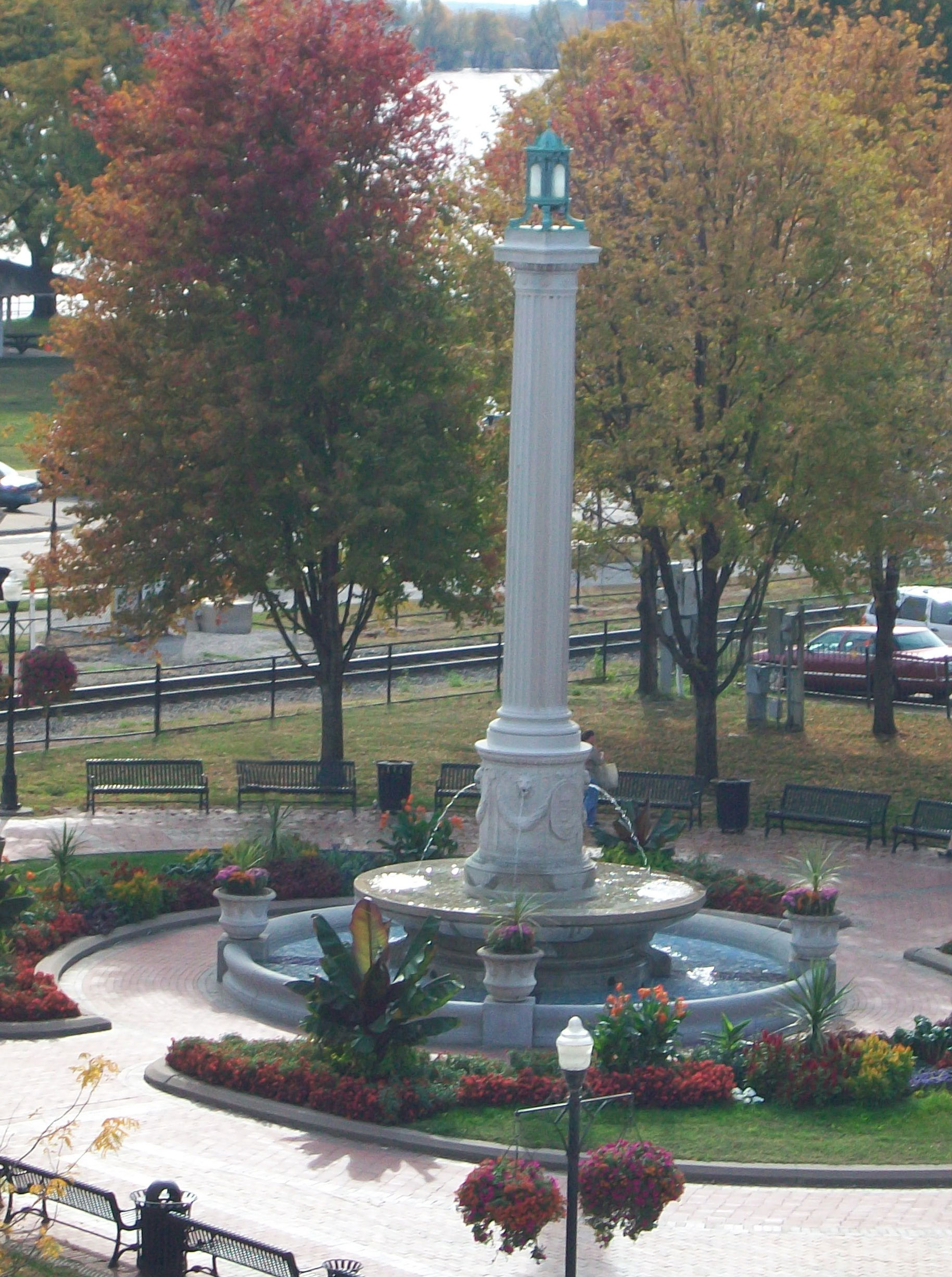
Dillon Memorial in Davenport, Iowa

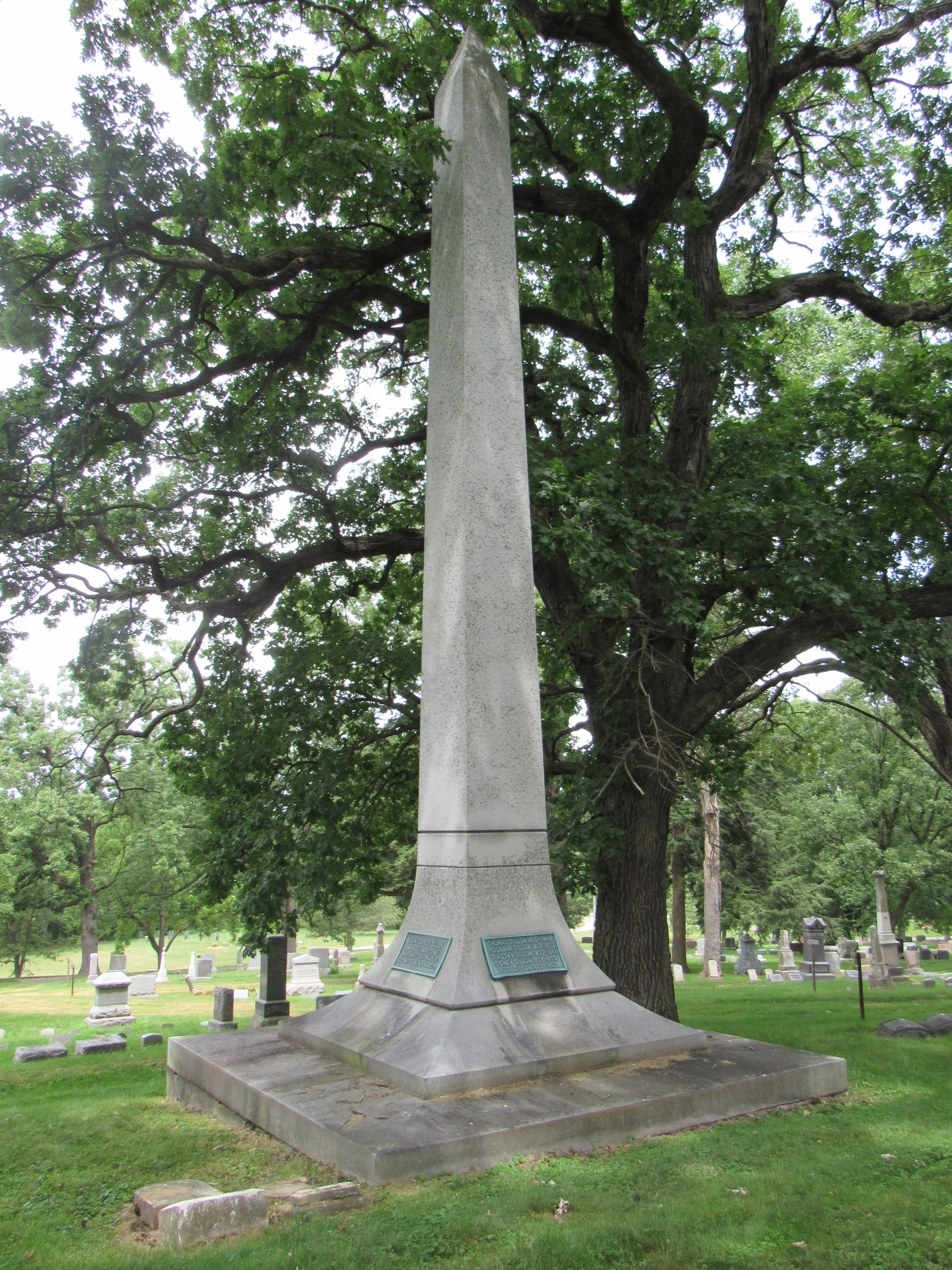
The Dillon Family monument in Oakdale Memorial Gardens in Davenport, Iowa where Dillon is buried.

A memorial fountain to Dillon was erected in downtown Davenport in 1918, carved of Indiana limestone in Romanesque style, by sculptor Harry Liva.

== Family ==
In 1853, Dillon married Anna Margery Price (born June 19, 1835). They had two sons and a daughter. Anna and their daughter, Mrs. Annie Dillon Oliver, died in the sinking of the French ocean liner La Bourgogne in July 1898. Dillon's oldest son, Hiram Price Dillon (1855–1918), became a lawyer in Iowa and a Master of Chancery in federal court.

John F. Dillon's sister married John B. Jordan, a merchant. That marriage produced a daughter, Jennie, who married Louis Stengel. Louis and Jennie Stengel were the parents of Casey Stengel, who had a long career as a baseball player and manager.

== Dillon's Rule ==
The theory of state preeminence over local governments was expressed as Dillon's Rule in an 1868 case: "Municipal corporations owe their origin to, and derive their powers and rights wholly from, the legislature. It breathes into them the breath of life, without which they cannot exist. As it creates, so may it destroy. If it may destroy, it may abridge and control". By contrast, the Cooley Doctrine, or the doctrine of home rule, expressed the theory of an inherent right to local self-determination. In a concurring opinion, Michigan Supreme Court Judge Thomas M. Cooley in 1871 stated, "local government is a matter of absolute right; and the state cannot take it away".

In Municipal Corporations (1872), Dillon contended that in contrast to the powers of states, which are unlimited but for express restrictions under the state or federal constitution, municipalities only have the powers that are expressly granted to them by the state, any power necessarily implied by an express power, and those powers essential to a municipality's existence. This formulation of the scope of municipal power came to be known as "Dillon's Rule".

The Supreme Court of the United States cited Municipal Corporations and fully adopted Dillon's emphasis on state power over municipalities in Hunter v. Pittsburgh, which upheld the power of Pennsylvania to consolidate the city of Allegheny into the city of Pittsburgh, despite the objections of a majority of Allegheny's residents. The Court's ruling that states could alter or abolish at will the charters of municipal corporations without infringing upon contract rights relied upon Dillon's distinction between public, municipal corporations and private ones. However, the Court did not prevent states from passing legislation or amending their constitutions to explicitly allow home rule. This constitutional allowance was reiterated in Trenton v. New Jersey, where the Supreme Court held that "In the absence of state constitutional provisions safeguarding it to them, municipalities have no inherent right of self-government which is beyond the legislative control of the state, but are merely departments of the state, with powers and privileges such as the state has seen fit to grant, held and exercised subject to its sovereign will".

== Sources ==
- Gerald E. Frug et al., Local Government Law, 3rd ed. pp. 139–158. West Publishing, 2001.
- See Arlington County v. White, 528 S.E.2d 706 (Va. 2000), for a modern use of the Dillon Rule to invalidate municipal action. See State v. Hutchison, 624 P.2d 1116 (Utah 1980) for an example of the minority, critical view.
- David Y. Miller, The Regional Governing of Metropolitan America, pp. 1–2. Westview Press, 2002.
- Robert W. Creamer, "Stengel: His Life and Times," pp. 21–23.

Legal offices
Preceded by Seat established by 16 Stat. 44	Judge of the United States Circuit Courts for the Eighth Circuit; 1869–1879	Succeeded by George W. McCrary
