= Robert J. Humphreys =

American judge from Virginia

Judge of the Virginia Court of Appeals
- In office April 16, 2000 – December 31, 2023
- Appointed by: Virginia General Assembly
- Succeeded by: Steven C. Frucci

Personal details
- Born: 1950 (age 75–76) San Diego, California
- Education: Washington and Lee University (B.A.); Widener University School of Law (J.D.)

Robert J. Humphreys (born 1950) is a Senior Judge of the Virginia Court of Appeals.

== Life and education ==
Humphreys was born in 1950 in San Diego, California. He received his Bachelor of Arts from Washington and Lee University and his Juris Doctor from Widener University School of Law.

== Legal career ==
Prior to becoming a judge he served as an Assistant Attorney General for the State of Delaware, Assistant Commonwealth's Attorney in Norfolk, Virginia and Chief Deputy Commonwealth's Attorney in Virginia Beach, as a partner in the law firm of McCardell, Inman, Benson, Strickler & Humphreys, P.C. in Virginia Beach and he served as Commonwealth's Attorney of Virginia Beach from 1990 to 2000.

== Service on Virginia Court of Appeals ==
He was first elected by the General Assembly on March 9, 2000, to an eight-year term beginning April 16, 2000. He was subsequently elected to a second eight-year term in 2008.

== Memberships ==
He is a past president of the Virginia Association of Commonwealth's Attorneys and past Chairman of the Commonwealth's Attorneys Services Council. He chaired the Virginia State Bar Task Force on Revisions to Rule 4.2, Rules of Professional Responsibility. He also currently serves as the Vice-Chairman of the Virginia Criminal Sentencing Commission and as President of the James Kent American Inn of Court.

Legal offices
Unknown	Judge of the Virginia Court of Appeals; 2000–present	Incumbent
