= Marla Graff Decker =

American judge from Virginia

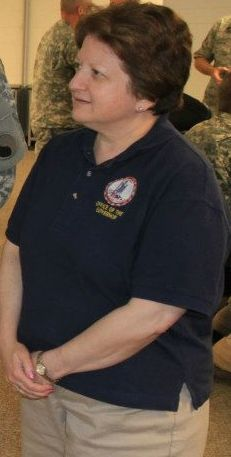

Judge of the Virginia Court of Appeals
- Incumbent
- Assumed office November 1, 2013
- Appointed by: Bob McDonnell (partial term); Virginia General Assembly (full term)
- Preceded by: Larry G. Elder

Chief Judge of the Virginia Court of Appeals
- Incumbent
- Assumed office January 1, 2019
- Appointed by: Virginia Court of Appeals
- Preceded by: Glen A. Huff

12th Virginia Secretary of Public Safety
- In office January 16, 2010 – November 1, 2013
- Governor: Bob McDonnell
- Preceded by: John W. Marshall
- Succeeded by: Brian Moran

Personal details
- Born: Marla Lynn Graff; May 31, 1958 (age 67) New York, New York, U.S.
- Party: Republican
- Spouse: Richard Henry Decker III
- Education: Gettysburg College (BA); University of Richmond (JD)

Marla Graff Decker (born May 31, 1958) is Chief Judge of the Court of Appeals of Virginia. She was appointed as a judge of the Court on October 1, 2013 by Governor Bob McDonnell and took office a month later. From 2010 until her swearing in as a judge, she was the Secretary of Public Safety in Governor McDonnell's cabinet. Judge Graff was elected to a full term by the Virginia General Assembly in January 2014 and re-elected in January 2022, after being elected to a four-year term as Chief Judge of the Court in 2019. She was re-elected as chief judge for another four years, beginning January 1, 2023.
