= Harold Fleming Snead =

American judge (1903–1987)

21st Chief Justice of Virginia
- In office October 1, 1969 – September 30, 1974
- Preceded by: John W. Eggleston
- Succeeded by: Lawrence W. I'Anson

Justice of the Supreme Court of Virginia
- In office January 14, 1957 – September 30, 1974
- Preceded by: Lemuel F. Smith
- Succeeded by: A. Christian Compton

Personal details
- Born: June 16, 1903 Richmond, Virginia, U.S.
- Died: December 23, 1987 (aged 84) Henrico County, Virginia, U.S.
- Resting place: Hollywood Cemetery
- Spouse: Elizabeth Somerville Call
- Children: 1
- Education: University of Richmond (BA); T. C. Williams Law School (LLB)

Harold Fleming Snead (June 16, 1903 – December 23, 1987) was an American agricultural supply store owner and justice of the Supreme Court of Appeals of Virginia.

== Early life ==
Harold Fleming Snead was born on June 16, 1903, in Richmond, Virginia. He graduated from the University of Richmond with a Bachelor of Arts in 1925 and a Bachelor of Laws from T. C. Williams Law School at the University of Richmond in 1929. He was student body president at the University of Richmond and at its law school. He received the best all-around graduate award in 1929. He was a member of Omicron Delta Kappa and Delta Theta Phi.

== Career ==
In 1933, Snead was appointed assistant trial justice of Henrico County. From 1935 to 1948, he was trial judge in Henrico County and, in 1948, was appointed judge of the Tenth Judicial Circuit.

Snead remained at the circuit court until he was appointed to the Supreme Court of Appeals of Virginia by Governor Thomas B. Stanley on November 21, 1956, succeeding Lemuel F. Smith. He took office on January 14, 1957, and was subsequently elected on January 20, 1958. He was again elected on March 6, 1964. With the retirement of John W. Eggleston on October 1, 1969, he became chief justice. He was the first native Richmonder ever to fill that position. During his tenure, Williamsburg was selected as the headquarters for the National Center for State Courts. Snead served on the Supreme Court until he retired on September 30, 1974. Upon his retirement, Governor Mills E. Godwin Jr. described Snead as "a popular, able and truly outstanding jurist".

Snead led the Association of Trial Justices of Virginia and the Judicial Conference of Virginia.

== Personal life ==
Snead married Elizabeth Somerville Call. They had one daughter, Elizabeth Call. He died on December 23, 1987 at his home in Henrico County. He was buried in Hollywood Cemetery.

== Awards ==
In 1972, Snead received the distinguished service award of the Virginia Trial Lawyers Association.
