= S. Bernard Goodwyn =

American judge (born 1961)

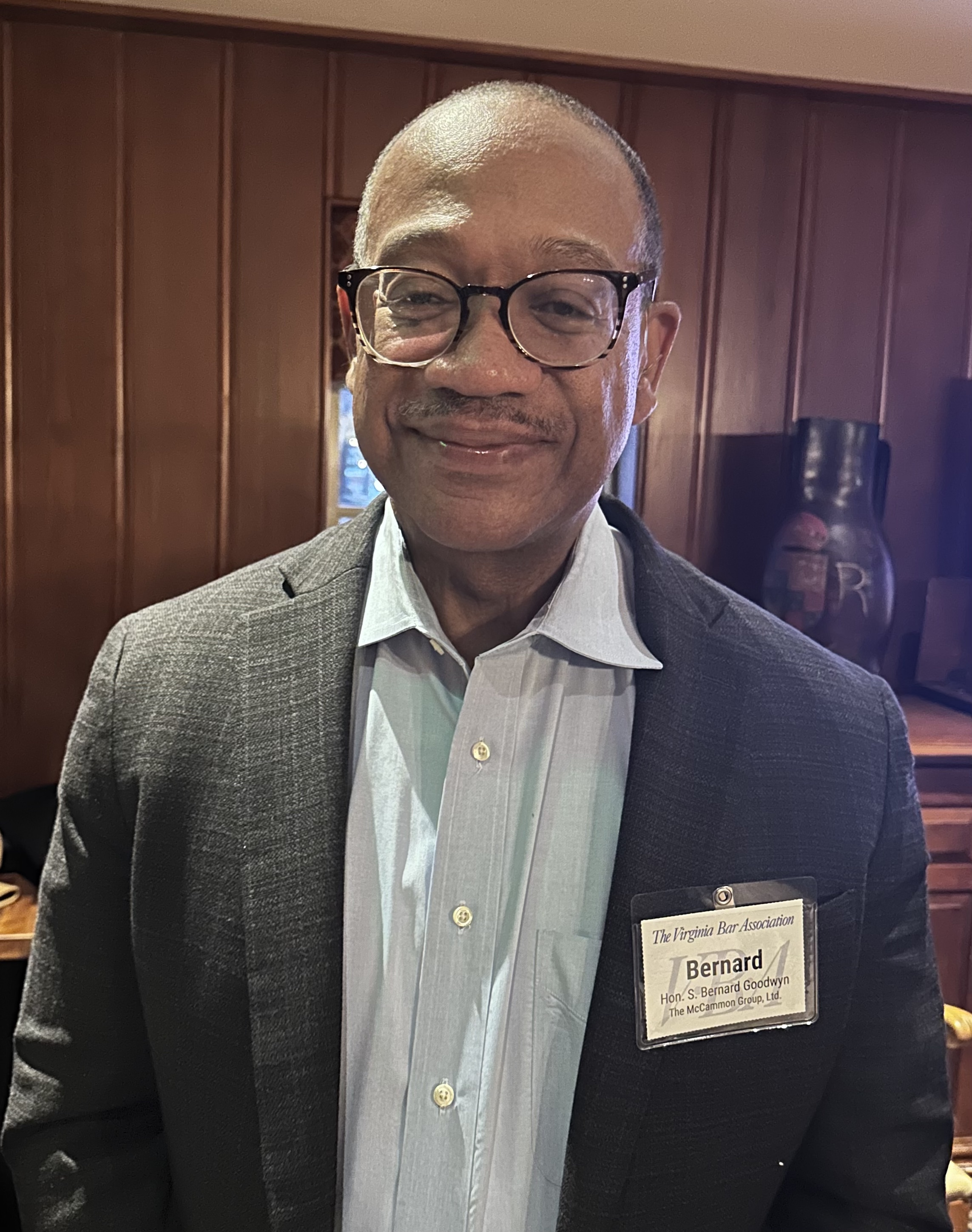

Chief Justice of Virginia
- In office January 1, 2022 – January 1, 2026
- Preceded by: Donald W. Lemons
- Succeeded by: Cleo Powell

Justice of the Virginia Supreme Court
- In office October 10, 2007 – January 1, 2026
- Appointed by: Tim Kaine
- Preceded by: Elizabeth B. Lacy
- Succeeded by: Junius P. Fulton III

Personal details
- Born: Samuel Bernard Goodwyn; February 23, 1961 (age 64) Southampton County, Virginia, U.S.
- Education: Harvard University (AB); University of Virginia (JD)

Samuel Bernard Goodwyn (born February 23, 1961) is a former judge and lawyer. He served as a justice of the Virginia Supreme Court from 2007 to 2026 and concurrently as chief justice from 2022 to 2026. He previously served as a circuit court judge in Chesapeake, Virginia.

== Early life ==
Samuel Bernard Goodwyn was born in 1961 in Southampton County, Virginia. He grew up in Boykins, Virginia. Neither of his parents, Dolly and Sam Goodwyn, had completed high school. His father worked as a carpenter and his mother sold insurance.

Goodwyn graduated from Southampton High School in 1979 as valedictorian. In high school, he was student body president, captain of the track team, and the football quarterback for two AA state championships. He also played the saxophone in the Tri-County Concert Band. He was selected for the Hearst Foundation United States Senate Youth Program in 1978.

Goodwyn graduated magna cum laude from Harvard University with an A.B. in economics in 1983. While at Harvard, he played varsity football and ran on the track team. He received his Juris Doctor from the University of Virginia School of Law in 1986. While in law school, he was an editor for the Virginia Tax Review, a member of the Raven Society, and received the Ritter Award in 1986.

== Career ==
Goodwyn practiced law with McGuire, Woods, Battle & Boothe in Charlottesville, Virginia from 1986 to 1988. He joined the law firm of Willcox & Savage in Norfolk, Virginia, working there in litigation from 1988 to 1995. He joined Wilcox & Savage as an associate and became a partner in January 1992, specializing in commercial, constitutional, and insurance defense litigation. Goodwyn became a member of the Virginia Bar Association in 1993. He was also a research associate professor of law at the University of Virginia School of Law from 1994 to 1995.

Goodwin was elected to serve as district court judge at the General District Court in Chesapeake, Virginia from 1995 to 1997. He was the first Black judge to serve on the Chesapeake district court. From 1997 until 2007, Goodwyn was a judge in the First Judicial Circuit Court in Chesapeake.

On October 10, 2007, Governor Tim Kaine appointed Goodwyn to the Supreme Court of Virginia to fill the vacancy created by the retirement of Justice Elizabeth B. Lacy early in 2007. He was sworn in by chief justice Leroy R. Hassell Sr. October 18, 2007. Although his appointment was immediate, the Virginia General Assembly had to confirm Goodwyn for a full twelve-year term. In the 2008 session, a political standoff between the Democratic-controlled Virginia Senate and the Republican-controlled Virginia House of Delegates resulted in Goodwyn's nomination being put on hold until February 8, 2008, the day his pro tempore appointment would have expired. On that day, the General Assembly unanimously appointed Goodwyn to a twelve-year term.

In January 2020, he was reappointed to another twelve-year term on the Supreme Court. He started a four-year term as chief justice on January 1, 2022. Goodwyn was the second African American to serve as the chief justice of the Supreme Court of Virginia. On January 31, 2025, Goodwyn announced that he would resign from the Supreme Court of Virginia effective January 1, 2026, coinciding with the end of his current term as chief justice of the court.

Goodwyn serves on the board of directors of the Conference of Chief Justices and was the co-chair of the Virginia Access to Justice Commission. He is an ex-officio member of The American Law Institute.

== Awards and honors ==
The Virginia Bar Association presented Goodwyn with its highest honor, the Gerald L. Baliles Distinguished Service Award, at its annual meeting in January 2025.

== Personal life ==
In 1985, Goodwyn married Sharon Smith, the sister of Goodwyn's roommate's girlfriend at Harvard. She is a lawyer who graduated from Harvard University and the University of Virginia School of Law in 1988. They have two children, Sarah Elizabeth Goodwyn and Samuel Jared Goodwyn.

Goodwyn was a deacon at the Galilee Baptist Church in Branchville, Virginia. He is a member of Sigma Pi Phi, Omega Psi Phi, and Prince Hall Masons.

Legal offices
Preceded by Elizabeth B. Lacy	Justice of the Supreme Court of Virginia; 2007–2026	Succeeded by Junius P. Fulton III
Preceded by Donald W. Lemons	Chief Justice of the Virginia Supreme Court; 2022–2026	Succeeded by Cleo Powell
