= Steven C. Frucci =

American judge

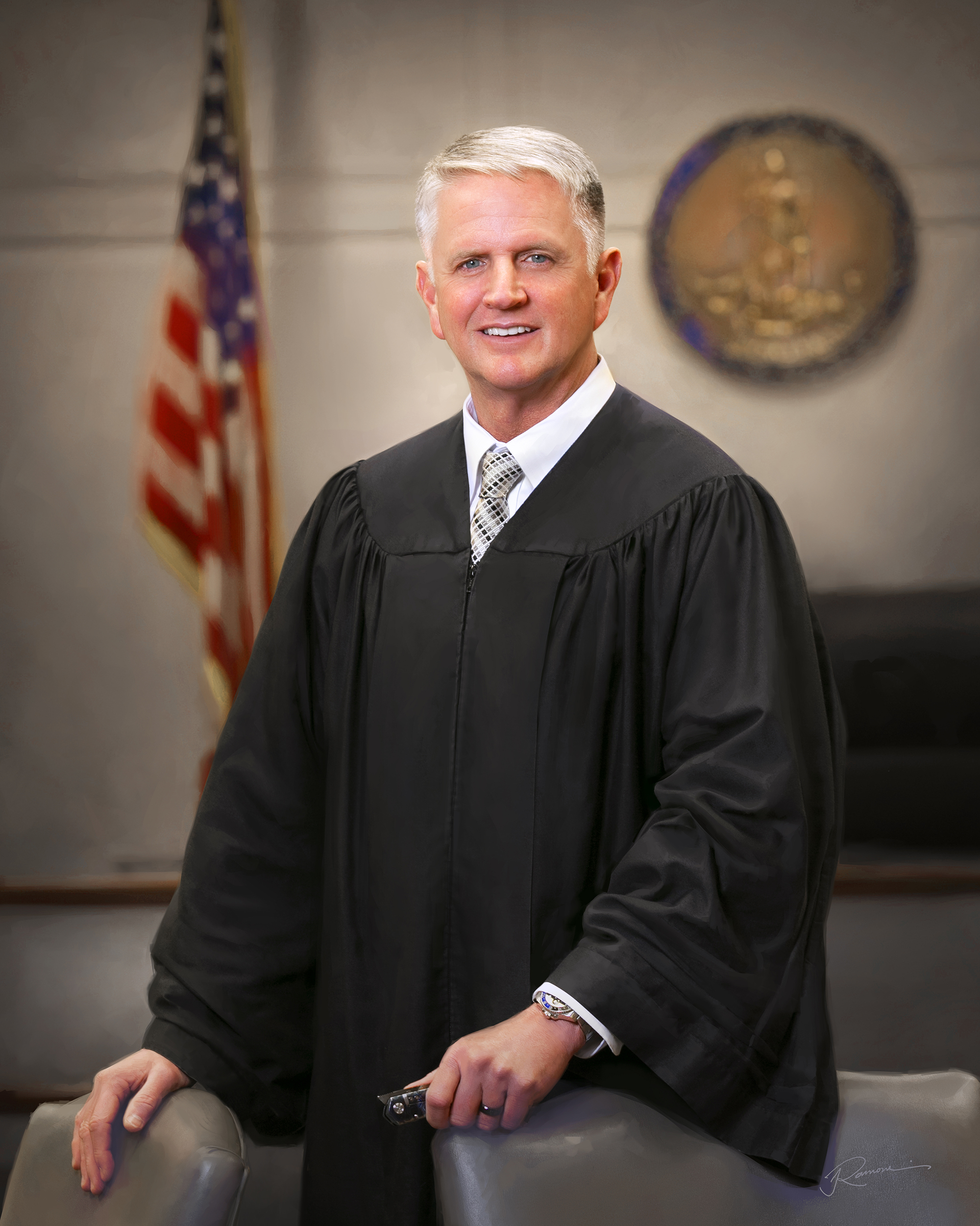
- Official portrait

Judge of the Court of Appeals of Virginia
- Incumbent
- Assumed office March 16, 2024
- Appointed by: Virginia General Assembly
- Preceded by: Robert J. Humphreys

Virginia Beach Circuit Court
- In office 2013–2024
- Appointed by: Virginia General Assembly

Virginia Beach General District Court
- In office 2009–2013
- Appointed by: Virginia General Assembly

Personal details
- Born: 1966 (age 59–60) Brunswick, Georgia
- Education: University of North Carolina at Chapel Hill (BA, JD)

Steven C. Frucci (born 1966 in Brunswick, Georgia) is a Judge of the Court of Appeals of Virginia, elected by the Senate and House of Delegates of Virginia to serve an 8-year term of office beginning March 16, 2024.

== Early life and education ==
Frucci was born in 1966 in Brunswick, Georgia. He received a Bachelor of Arts in political science from the University of North Carolina at Chapel Hill (UNC) in 1988, and a Juris Doctor from UNC's law school in 1991.

== Career ==
=== Legal ===
Frucci was admitted to the Virginia Bar in the fall of 1991, and the Hawaii Bar in 1997 and, for the 18 years prior to taking the bench, was a trial attorney in criminal and civil areas of practice.

=== Judicial ===
Frucci was appointed to the Virginia Beach General District Court in 2009, and elevated to the Virginia Beach Circuit Court in 2013, and finally to the Virginia Court of Appeals in March 2024. While a Circuit Court judge, Frucci created the first ever Drug Court in the City of Virginia Beach in 2016. Frucci is a member of the Virginia Sentencing Commission, the Virginia Criminal Justice Conference, served as a judicial mentor, and was a member of the steering committee that created Virginia Judicial Mentoring Program. Further, Frucci has always been an outspoken advocate for the importance of appropriate judicial demeanor within the Virginia judiciary.

== Notable Cases ==
Frucci wrote an opinion while a Circuit Court Judge in 2014 wherein he ruled for the first time that passcodes in iPhones are constitutionally protected under the fifth amendment, while fingerprint security measures are not. Frucci also ruled in 2016, for the first time in Virginia, that a non-biological spouse enjoyed parental rights to a child raised within a same-sex marriage.
