= Michael Webert =

American politician (born 1979)

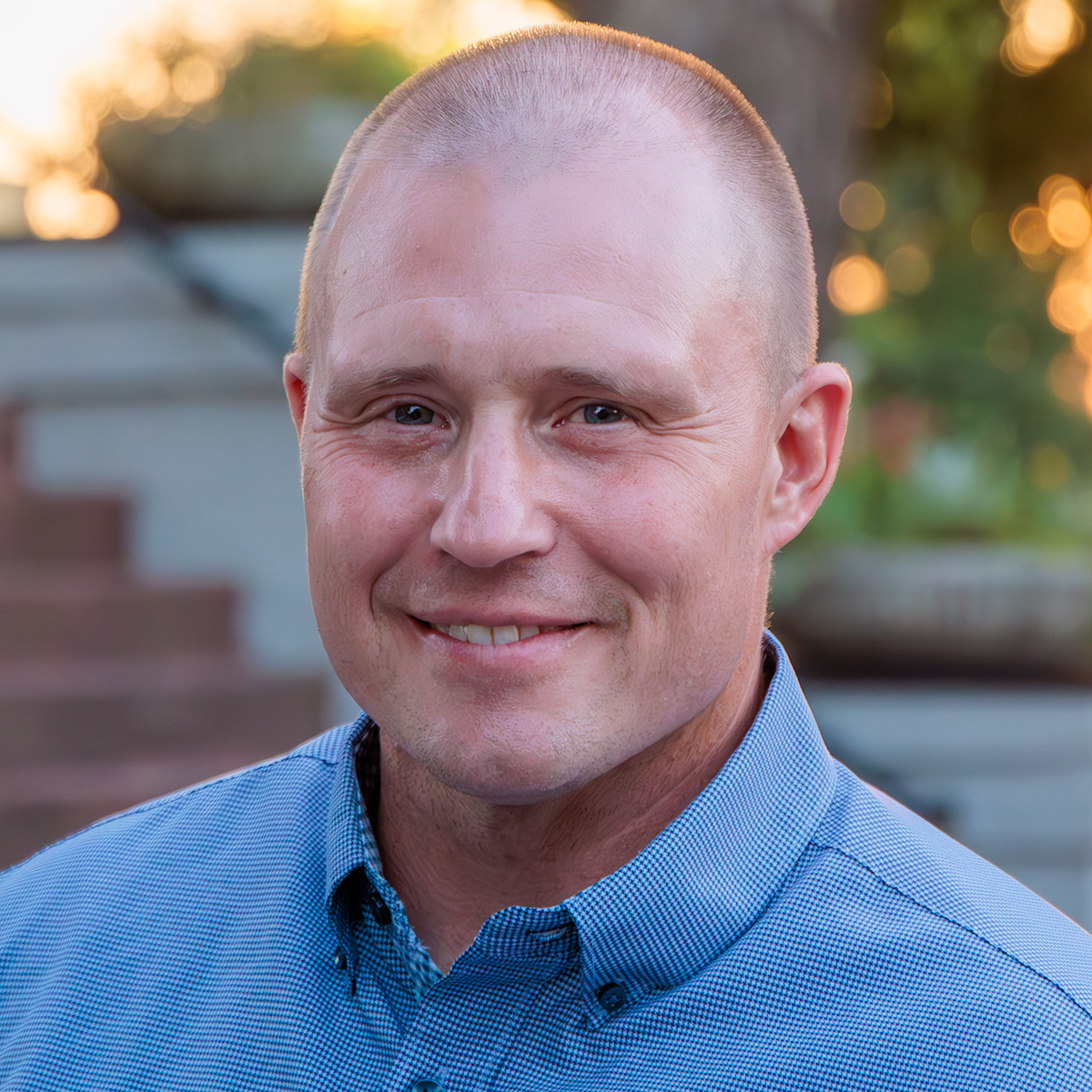

Member of the Virginia House of Delegates
- Incumbent
- Assumed office January 11, 2012
- Preceded by: Clay Athey
- Constituency: 18th district (2012–2024); 61st district (2024–present)

Republican Caucus Whip

Personal details
- Born: September 24, 1979 (age 47) Denver, Colorado, U.S.
- Party: Republican
- Spouse: Rebecca Funkhouser
- Children: 2
- Education: George Mason University
- Occupation: Farmer
- Committees: Agriculture, Chesapeake and Natural Resources; Commerce and Energy; Public Safety; Rules
- Website: www.michael-webert.com

Michael J. Webert (born September 24, 1979) is an American politician. A Republican, he was elected to the Virginia House of Delegates in 2011. He currently represents the 61st district, made up of Rappahannock County and parts of Culpeper and Fauquier, in the north central part of the state.

== Early life, education, and business career ==
A native of Denver, Colorado, Webert graduated from the Kent School in Kent, Connecticut in 1998. After moving to Virginia, he received a B.A. in Communications from George Mason University in 2010.

He is the general manager of Locust Hill Farm, LLC, a cattle farm near Middleburg, Virginia. He also owns a cattle marketing business.

Webert married Rebecca Funkhouser. They have two sons and live outside of Warrenton.

== Political career ==
The 18th House district incumbent, Republican Clay Athey of Front Royal, did not run for re-election in 2011 following redistricting that radically altered the map of the district. The following year, the General Assembly appointed Athey a circuit court judge.

In 2011, Webert won the Republican primary with 56.4% of the vote, defeating Kevin P. Kelley of Warrenton with 2,016 votes to Kelley's 1,556. He then won the general election with 69.6% of the vote, defeating Democratic candidate Bob L. Zwick of The Plains. He received 9,749 votes while Zwick received 4,264.

In 2013, Webert won reelection with 63.3% of the vote, defeating Democratic nominee Colin S. Harris, a 22-year-old aerospace executive from Orlean, in the general election. He received 15,549 votes while Harris received 8,979 votes, or 36.5% of the vote. This was (and remains, as of 2019) the strongest Democratic performance in the strongly Republican 18th district since 2001, when Peter B. Schwartz of Marshall won 37.3% of the vote in a three-way race against Athey and independent candidate Jerry M. Wood of Warrenton (who had previously served one term in the House of Delegates as a Democrat from 1992 to 1994).

Webert ran unopposed in the 2015 election, winning 96.9% of the vote.

In the 2017 election, Webert won his fourth term in the House of Delegates, defeating Democratic candidate Tristan D. Shields, a musician from Rixeyville, and Green Party candidate Wilton King, a retired Marine and federal air marshal from Bealeton. He received 16,686 votes while Shields received 9,486 and King received 1,433.
