= Virginia's 18th House of Delegates district =

Virginia legislative district

Virginia's 18th State House of Delegates district
- District map from the 2023 election
Delegate
| Kathy Tran; D–Fairfax County |
- Demographics: 41% White; 11% Black; 19% Hispanic; 22% Asian; 0% Native American; 0% Hawaiian/Pacific Islander; 1% Other; 6% Multiracial
- Population (2024) • Voting age: 83,779; 18
- Registered voters: 61,825

Virginia's 18th House of Delegates district elects one of 100 seats in the Virginia House of Delegates, the lower house of the state's bicameral legislature. District 18, covers parts of Fairfax County, and is represented by Democrat Kathy Tran.

== District officeholders ==
| Years | Delegate | Party | Electoral history |
|---|---|---|---|
| January 12, 1983 – January 10, 1990 | William T. Wilson | Democratic | Defeated in bid for reelection |
| January 10, 1990 – January 8, 1992 | Malfourd W. Trumbo | Republican | |
| January 8, 1992 – December 27, 2001 | Creigh Deeds | Democratic | Resigned; Elected to State Senate of Virginia via special election |
| January 9, 2002 – January 11, 2012 | Clay Athey | Republican | Declined to seek reelection; Appointed judge of the 26th Judicial Circuit |
| January 11, 2012 – January 10, 2024 | Michael Webert | Republican | First elected in 2011. Redistricted to the 61st District |
| January 10, 2024 – present | Kathy Tran | Democratic | Redistricted from the 42nd District |
