= Lemuel F. Smith =

American judge

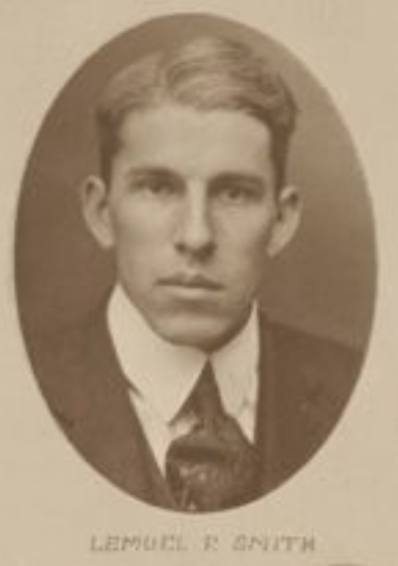
- Lemuel Smith photographic portrait for 1920 Virginia House of Delegates

Justice of the Supreme Court of Virginia
- In office February 15, 1951 – October 15, 1956
- Preceded by: Abram P. Staples
- Succeeded by: Harold F. Snead

Member of the Virginia House of Delegates for Albemarle, Greene, and Charlottesville
- In office January 14, 1920 – 1926
- Preceded by: David H. Pitts; Eber A. Carpenter
- Succeeded by: Albert S. Bolling

Personal details
- Born: Lemuel Franklin Smith; April 21, 1890 Shadwell, Virginia, U.S.
- Died: October 15, 1956 (aged 66) Virginia, U.S.
- Spouse: Eleanor Grace Stulting
- Education: Randolph Macon College; University of Virginia

Lemuel Franklin Smith (April 21, 1890 – October 15, 1956) was a Virginia, legislator, lawyer and judge.

== Early life ==
Smith was born in Albemarle County, Virginia on April 21, 1890. He attended Randolph Macon College, where he was a member of the Kappa Sigma fraternity and received his Bachelor of Arts degree.

== Career ==
After teaching for three years at Randolph Macon Academy, he entered law school at the University of Virginia where he received his law degree in 1916. Shortly after that, he and John S. Battle opened a law office in Charlottesville. He was a member of Charlottesville's City Council, a member of the Virginia House of Delegates, Commonwealth's Attorney for Albemarle County, judge of the Eighth Judicial Circuit and, in 1951, was elected to the Supreme Court of Appeals of Virginia. He served on the court until his death. Justice Smith received an honorary LL. D. from Randolph Macon in 1951.
