= Mary B. Malveaux =

American judge from Virginia

Judge of the Virginia Court of Appeals
- Incumbent
- Assumed office April 16, 2016
- Appointed by: Virginia General Assembly
- Preceded by: Stephen R. McCullough

Personal details
- Born: 1967 (age 58–59) Lynwood, California
- Education: University of Virginia (BA); University of Richmond (JD)

Mary Janipher Bennett Malveaux (born 1967) is a judge of the Virginia Court of Appeals.

== Life and education ==
Malveaux was born in Lynwood, California. She was raised in Richmond, and attended Collegiate School. She received a Bachelor of Arts from University of Virginia in 1990 and a Juris Doctor from University of Richmond School of Law in 1993.

== Legal career ==
Admitted to the Virginia bar in 1993, she served as assistant commonwealth attorney in Henrico County, and gained a reputation as a tough but fair prosecutor. Beginning in 1998, she worked in private practice, handling both civil and criminal cases. In 2011 Malveaux became the first female full-time district court judge in Henrico County, serving in Virginia's 14th Judicial District.

== Service on Virginia Court of Appeals ==
Malveaux was elected by the General Assembly on March 11, 2016, to an eight-year term beginning April 16, 2016, to fill the vacancy created by the elevation of Stephen R. McCullough to the Virginia Supreme Court. Her current term expires on April 15, 2024. Her appointment to the court makes her only the second African-American appointed to the Appeals court in its history.

Legal offices
Preceded by Stephen R. McCullough	Judge of the Virginia Court of Appeals; 2016–present	Incumbent
