= Toby J. Heytens =

American judge (born 1975)

Toby Heytens
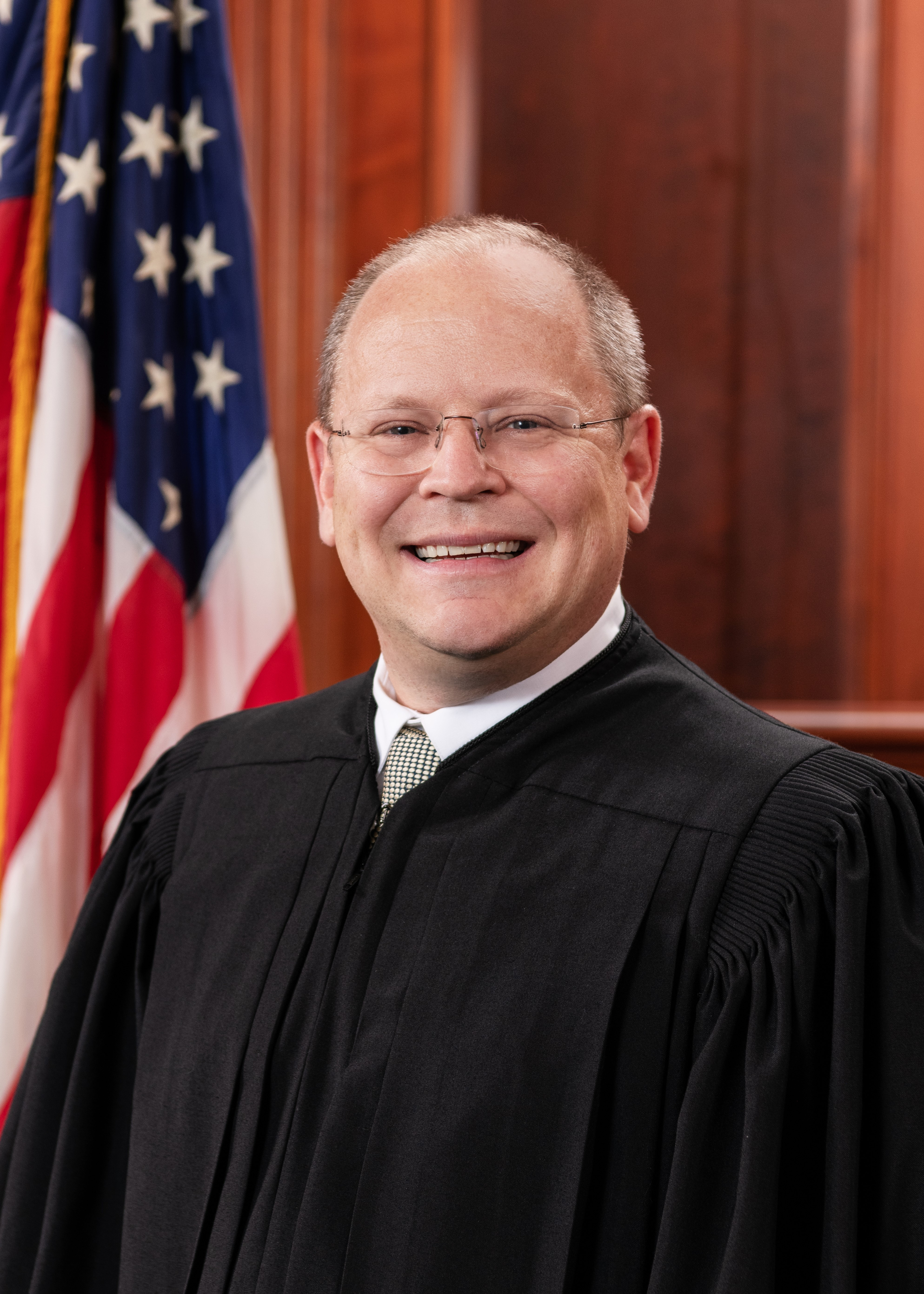
- Heytens in 2022

Judge of the United States Court of Appeals for the Fourth Circuit
- Incumbent
- Assumed office November 2, 2021
- Appointed by: Joe Biden
- Preceded by: Barbara Milano Keenan

Solicitor General of Virginia
- In office January 9, 2018 – August 6, 2021
- Governor: Ralph Northam
- Preceded by: Trevor Cox
- Succeeded by: Michelle Kallen

Personal details
- Born: Toby Jay Heytens; 1975 (age 50–51) Duluth, Minnesota, U.S.
- Party: Democratic
- Education: Macalester College (BA); University of Virginia (JD)

Toby Jay Heytens (born 1975) is an American attorney and law professor who is a United States circuit judge of the United States Court of Appeals for the Fourth Circuit. He served as the solicitor general of Virginia from 2018 to 2021.

== Education ==
Heytens graduated from Macalester College in 1997 with a Bachelor of Arts. He then attended the University of Virginia School of Law, where he was an articles development editor for the Virginia Law Review. He graduated in 2000 with a Juris Doctor and membership in Order of the Coif.

== Career ==
After graduating from law school, Heytens was a law clerk for chief judge Edward R. Becker of the United States Court of Appeals for the Third Circuit from 2000 to 2001. He was a Bristow Fellow in the Office of the Solicitor General of the United States from 2001 to 2002. From 2002 to 2003, he served as a law clerk for Associate Justice Ruth Bader Ginsburg of the Supreme Court of the United States. From 2003 to 2006, Heytens worked in the Supreme Court and appellate practice group at O'Melveny & Myers in Washington, D.C. From 2007 to 2010, he served as an assistant to the solicitor general at the United States Department of Justice.

Heytens has served as a law professor, first as a visiting assistant professor at Cornell Law School in 2005, and then at the University of Virginia School of Law as an associate professor of law from 2006 to 2007 and again from 2010 to 2014, and as a professor of law from 2014 to 2021.

=== Solicitor general of Virginia ===
On January 9, 2018, Heytens was named Solicitor General of Virginia. He served under Virginia Attorney General Mark Herring, who was reelected in 2017.

=== Federal judicial service ===
In May 2021, Heytens was named as a possible nominee for the upcoming vacancy on the United States Court of Appeals for the Fourth Circuit. On June 30, 2021, President Joe Biden announced his intent to nominate Heytens to serve as a United States circuit judge for the Fourth Circuit. On July 13, 2021, his nomination was sent to the Senate. President Biden nominated Heytens to the seat being vacated by Judge Barbara Milano Keenan, who subsequently assumed senior status on August 31, 2021. On July 28, 2021, a hearing on his nomination was held before the Senate Judiciary Committee. On September 23, 2021, his nomination was favorably reported by the committee by a 14–8 vote. On October 25, 2021, Majority Leader Chuck Schumer filed cloture on his nomination. On October 28, 2021, the United States Senate invoked cloture on his nomination by a 51–31 vote. On November 1, 2021, his nomination was confirmed by a 53–43 vote. He received his judicial commission on November 2, 2021. He was sworn into office on November 4, 2021, by Chief Judge Roger Gregory.

== See also ==
- List of law clerks for the sixth seat of the Supreme Court of the United States

Legal offices
Preceded by Barbara Milano Keenan	Judge of the United States Court of Appeals for the Fourth Circuit; 2021–present	Incumbent
