= Jane Marum Roush =

American judge (born 1956)

Justice of the Supreme Court of Virginia
- In office August 1, 2015 – February 12, 2016
- Appointed by: Terry McAuliffe
- Preceded by: LeRoy F. Millette Jr.
- Succeeded by: Stephen R. McCullough

Personal details
- Born: Jane Ellen Marum; September 24, 1956 (age 70) Massachusetts, U.S.
- Spouse: David A. Roush
- Children: 3
- Education: Wellesley College (AB); University of Virginia (JD)

Jane Marum Roush (born September 24, 1956) is an American lawyer and judge who served as an interim Justice of the Supreme Court of Virginia from 2015 to 2016.

On July 27, 2015, Governor Terry McAuliffe announced his appointment of Roush to fill the vacancy created by the retirement of Justice LeRoy F. Millette Jr. effective July 31, 2015. Under the Constitution of Virginia, this original interim appointment was to expire thirty days after the commencement of the next session of the Virginia General Assembly, unless the legislature elected her to a full twelve-year term. On August 17, 2015, the General Assembly convened in special session but failed to elect anyone to the full twelve-year term before the Senate of Virginia purported to adjourn sine die.

The Constitution prohibits one chamber of the legislature from adjourning for more than three days without the consent of the other chamber. The Governor claimed that this provision applied only to regular sessions of the General Assembly; the House of Delegates and most Senate Republicans claimed it applied to special sessions as well, and that the Senate's adjournment was invalid because the House did not consent. Because there was legal uncertainty about whether the legislature was still in session, it was unclear whether the governor could fill the vacancy created when Justice Roush's original interim appointment expired on September 16, 2015. Nevertheless, the governor announced his view that the legislature was not in session and purported to reappoint her for a second interim term. Whether this second interim appointment was valid or invalid has not been determined. If valid, the second interim appointment expired on February 12, 2016, thirty days after the regular session of the General Assembly began on January 13, because the legislature did not elect her to a full twelve-year term.

On March 2, 2016, the Senate nominated Roush to a full, twelve-year term, beginning March 1, 2016. The House rejected the nomination by a 38–55 vote. Later that month, the General Assembly elected then-Judge Stephen R. McCullough to fill the seat for a full term.

== Biography ==
Roush graduated from Wellesley College in 1978 and obtained her Juris Doctor degree from the University of Virginia School of Law in 1981. She practiced at Boothe Pritchard & Dudley, which later became part of McGuireWoods LLP, and Hogan & Hartson, which later became part of Hogan Lovells. She was elected a judge of the circuit court of the Nineteenth Judicial Circuit of Virginia, encompassing Fairfax County, in 1993.
