= Cleo Powell =

American judge (born 1957)

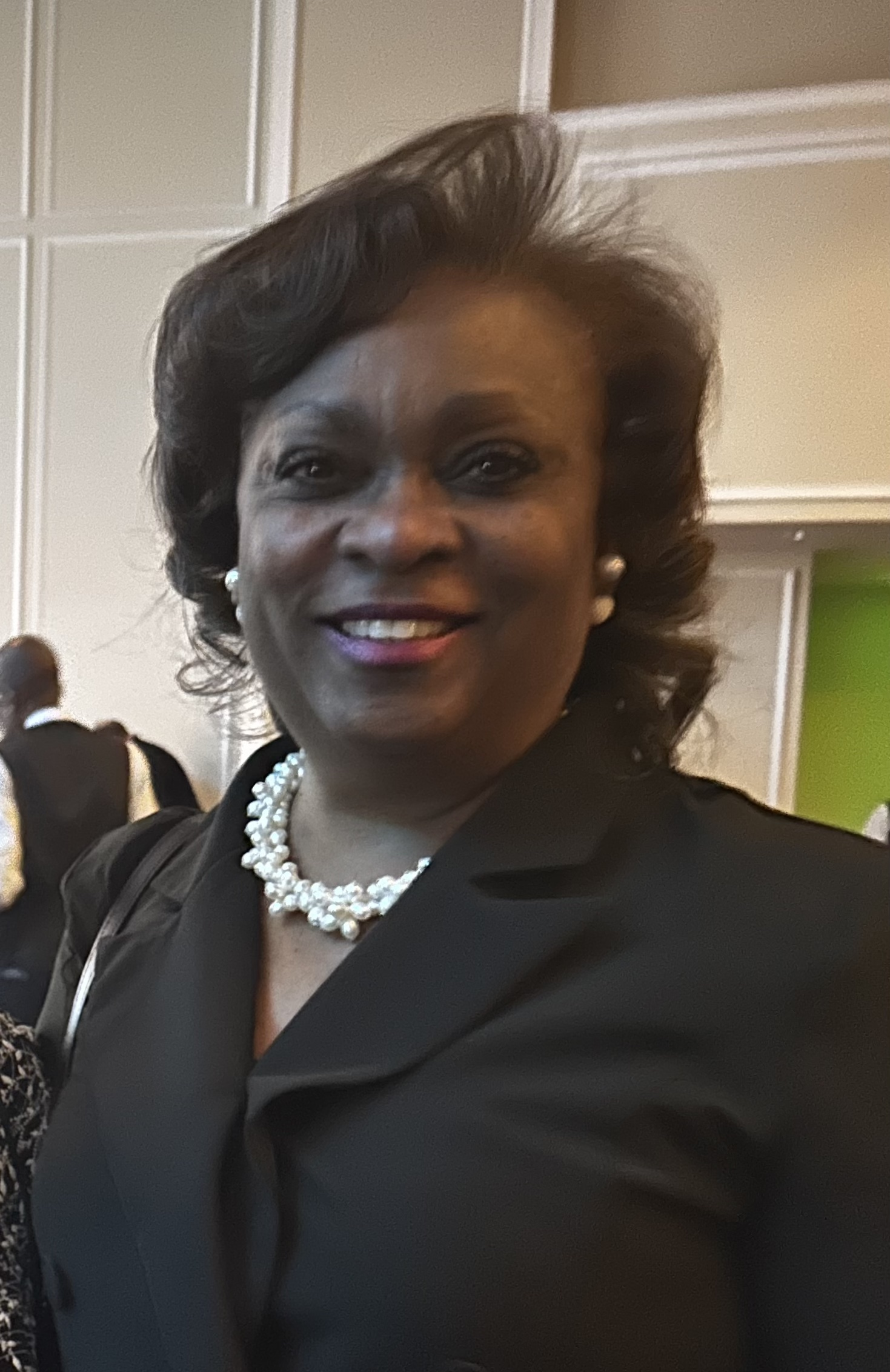
- Powell in 2025

Chief Justice of Virginia
- Incumbent
- Assumed office January 1, 2026
- Preceded by: S. Bernard Goodwyn

Justice of the Supreme Court of Virginia
- Incumbent
- Assumed office August 1, 2011
- Preceded by: Leroy R. Hassell Sr.

Judge of the Virginia Court of Appeals
- In office August 15, 2008 – August 1, 2011
- Appointed by: Tim Kaine
- Preceded by: LeRoy F. Millette Jr.
- Succeeded by: Glen A. Huff

Personal details
- Born: Cleo Elaine Powell; January 12, 1957 (age 69) Brunswick County, Virginia, U.S.
- Spouse: Alvin Larnell Dilworth
- Education: University of Virginia (BA, JD)

Cleo Elaine Powell (born January 12, 1957) is the chief justice of the Supreme Court of Virginia. She is the first African-American female and fifth woman overall to serve on Virginia's highest court.

== Early life and education ==
Born in Brunswick County, Virginia, Powell received an undergraduate degree in government from the University of Virginia in 1979. She returned to Charlottesville for legal studies and received her Juris Doctor from the University of Virginia School of Law in 1982.

== Career ==
Upon admission to the Virginia bar, Powell worked at Hunton & Williams as an associate lawyer (1982–1986), specializing in labor and employment law. Powell then entered government service in the office of the Virginia Attorney General Mary Sue Terry, rising to become Senior Assistant for the Equal Employment Opportunity and Personnel Section before departing in 1989. She then re-entered the private sector as a corporate counsel for Virginia Power, and directed their employee services section until 1993.

In 1993, following a conversation with former Richmond mayor and state senator Henry L. Marsh, Powell returned to the public sector, and would serve as a judge at every level of Virginia's judicial system. The Virginia General Assembly first elected her as a General District Court Judge for Chesterfield and Colonial Heights, Virginia, and she served in that position until 2000. Elected as a Circuit Court Judge for the 12th Judicial Circuit (the same geographic area), she continued to serve in that trial position until 2008. During the administration of Governor Tim Kaine, legislators elected her to the Court of Appeals of Virginia, and she served in that position until mid-2011.

Following the death of Leroy R. Hassell, Virginia governor Bob McDonnell nominated Powell to fill the vacancy, then legislators elected her to the Virginia Supreme Court on July 29, 2011, and Powell took the oath of office on August 2, 2011. She was re-elected twelve years later, and took the oath of office for her current twelve-year term on October 21, 2023, so her term expires in 2035. However, Justice Powell will reach the mandatory retirement age of 73 in 2030, prior to the end of her term.

In 2013, Powell was honored as one of the Library of Virginia's "Virginia Women in History". She has received other awards, and is also a distinguished visiting professor of law at the Appalachian School of Law. On October 21, 2023, Powell was sworn in for her second twelve-year term, which now ends on July 31, 2035. On August 25, 2025, it was announced that Powell had been unanimously selected by her colleagues to succeed Chief Justice Bernard S. Goodwyn as the next chief justice of the court when he subsequently retired at the end of 2025. Powell is the second woman and first African-American woman to serve as Chief Justice in Virginia.

== See also ==
- List of African-American jurists

Legal offices
| Preceded by Leroy R. Hassell Sr. | Justice of the Virginia Supreme Court; 2011–present | Incumbent |
| Preceded by S. Bernard Goodwyn | Chief Justice of the Virginia Supreme Court; 2026–present | Incumbent |
