= Glen A. Huff =

Former judge of the Virginia Court of Appeals, United States

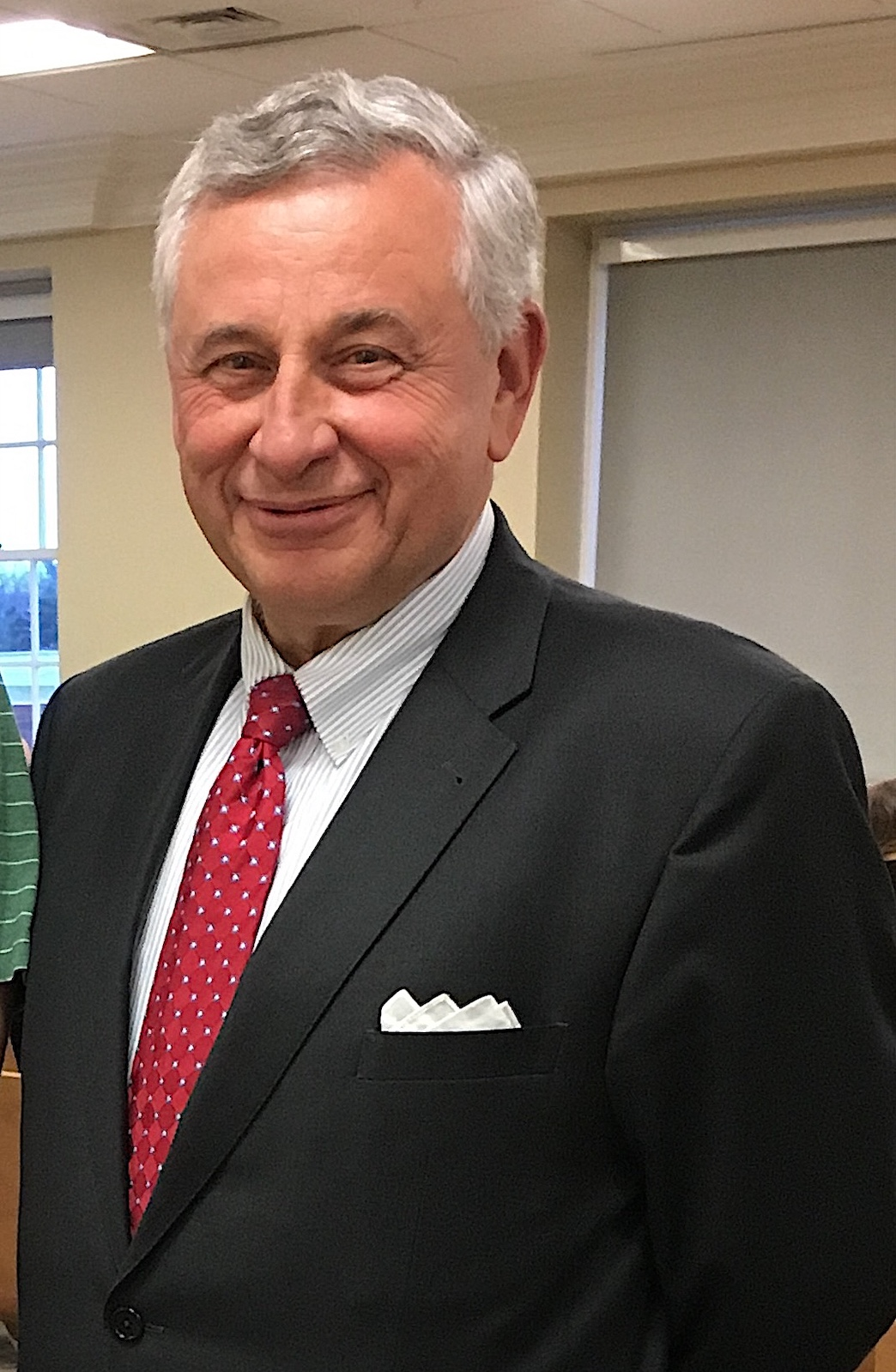
- Then-Chief Judge Glen Huff in 2017

Judge of the Virginia Court of Appeals
- In office August 1, 2011 – December 31, 2024
- Appointed by: Virginia General Assembly
- Preceded by: Cleo E. Powell
- Succeeded by: David Bernhard

Chief Judge of the Virginia Court of Appeals
- In office January 1, 2015 – December 31, 2018
- Appointed by: Virginia Court of Appeals
- Preceded by: Walter S. Felton Jr.
- Succeeded by: Marla Graff Decker

Personal details
- Born: June 18, 1951 (age 74) Skowhegan, Maine
- Education: University of Maine (B.A.); University of New Hampshire School of Law (J.D.)

Glen Alton Huff (born June 18, 1951) is a former judge of the Virginia Court of Appeals.

== Life and education ==
Huff was born in 1951 in Skowhegan, Maine. He received his Bachelor of Arts from the University of Maine and his Juris Doctor from the University of New Hampshire School of Law.

== Legal career ==
He practiced law with the firm of Huff, Poole & Mahoney, P.C. in Hampton Roads, Virginia.

== Service on Virginia Court of Appeals ==
The General Assembly elected him on July 29, 2011, to an eight-year term beginning August 1, 2011, to fill the vacancy created by Cleo E. Powell's elevation to the Supreme Court of Virginia. He was elected by the court on October 20, 2014, to a four-year term as chief judge beginning January 1, 2015, filling the vacancy created by the retirement of Walter S. Felton Jr. He was succeeded as chief judge by Judge Marla Graff Decker. He was re-elected to a second eight-year term on January 16, 2019, set to expire in 2027. However, on March 1, 2024, State Senator Scott Surovell revealed that Judge Huff "had written a letter advising [the General Assembly] he would be retiring from the court" on December 31, 2024. The General Assembly elected Fairfax Circuit Court judge David Bernhard to succeed him, starting January 1, 2025.

Legal offices
Preceded by Cleo E. Powell	Judge of the Virginia Court of Appeals; 2011–present	Incumbent
