= Charles S. Russell =

American judge and lawyer (1926–2026)

Charles Stevens Russell (February 23, 1926 – February 28, 2026) was an American lawyer in the Commonwealth of Virginia and a former Justice of the Supreme Court of Virginia. He retired as an active member of the Court in 1991.

== Life and career ==
Russell was born in Richmond, Virginia, on February 23, 1926. He received his secondary education at the Congressional Pages School in Washington, D. C., and from there went on to the University of Virginia where he received his B.A. and, in 1948, his LL.B. Russell was a member of and served as president of the Virginia Eta chapter of Sigma Phi Epsilon fraternity and the Virginia Glee Club.

He was admitted to the bar in 1949 and practiced in Arlington and Fairfax from 1951 to 1967 when he was appointed as a judge for the Seventeenth Judicial Circuit of Virginia. In early 1982, he was elected to the Supreme Court of Virginia, effective March 1, 1982. Russell retired in 1991, though on January 1, 2004, he returned to service on the court as a Senior Justice.

Russell gained notoriety in 1979 when he refused to follow a jury recommendation to give a convicted rapist a six-year prison sentence, giving him probation and offering to write a letter on his behalf. He was a member of both Omicron Delta Kappa and the Raven Society.

Russell turned 100 on February 23, 2026, and died five days later, on February 28.
