= Elizabeth B. Lacy =

American judge

Justice of the Supreme Court of Virginia
- In office January 4, 1989 – August 16, 2007
- Appointed by: Gerald Baliles
- Preceded by: Richard H. Poff
- Succeeded by: S. Bernard Goodwyn

Member of the Virginia State Corporation Commission
- In office April 1, 1985 – December 1988
- Preceded by: Junie L. Bradshaw
- Succeeded by: Theodore V. Morrison Jr.

Personal details
- Born: Elizabeth Bermingham; January 12, 1945 (age 81) Parris Island, South Carolina, U.S.
- Spouse: Dennis Patrick Lacy Jr.
- Education: Saint Mary's College (BA); University of Texas (JD); University of Virginia (LLM)

Elizabeth Bermingham Lacy (born January 12, 1945) is a Virginia jurist. She was the first woman named to the Virginia State Corporation Commission and later was the first woman named to be a justice of the Supreme Court of Virginia, where she served until her retirement in 2007.

== Early and family life ==
Lacy graduated from St. Mary's College at Notre Dame in 1966 and taught elementary school in Texas for a year. She studied law at the University of Texas Law School and graduated in 1969. She also received an LL.M. from the University of Virginia School of Law in 1992.

== Career ==
Lacy practiced law in Texas before moving to Virginia, serving for three years with the Texas Legislative Council, and then for three years with the Texas Attorney General's office, specializing in antitrust and consumer protection law.

From 1976 to 1977, Lacy moved to Virginia and served as legislative aide to state delegate Carrington Williams.

She then began working for the Virginia Office of Attorney General, under Gerald L. Baliles. She rose to become the state Deputy Attorney General for Judicial Affairs (a division that prosecutes consumer protection violations, oversees the state's antitrust laws, state regulations and conflict of interest statutes).

Governor Charles S. Robb appointed her to the State Corporation Commission, which had judicial as well as responsibilities. She was the first woman on the SCC. After Gerald L. Baliles was elected Governor of Virginia, he appointed Lacy to the Virginia Supreme Court as discussed below. Delegate Theodore V. Morrison Jr., a lawyer from Newport News, Virginia and part-time member of the General Assembly, was nominated and confirmed to succeed her on the SCC.

On November 22, 1988, Gov. Baliles appointed Lacy to the Virginia Supreme Court, and the General Assembly confirmed her appointment in due course. She was again the first woman to hold the position, and she was subsequently elected to a full 12-year term. Although by seniority she was the longest serving active member of the Supreme Court when Chief Justice Harry L. Carrico retired, Lacy did not succeed him as chief justice. Although the chief justice was previously the senior active member of the Court, a change in the law before Chief Justice Carrico's retirement provided that in future the chief justice would be selected by an election of the Court members for a four-year term. Chief Justice Leroy Rountree Hassell, Sr., then second in seniority to Justice Lacy, was elected chief justice, and was the first African American to hold that position. Justice Lacy retired and took senior status effective August 16, 2007. On December 31, 2019, Justice Lacy stepped down as a senior justice after more than 30 years' service to the Court.

The Library of Virginia honored her as one of the eight Virginia Women in History for 2008.

== See also ==
- List of female state supreme court justices
