= Richard Y. AtLee Jr. =

American judge (born 1971)

Judge of the Virginia Court of Appeals
- Incumbent
- Assumed office February 1, 2015

Personal details
- Born: 1971 (age 54–55) Newport News, Virginia, U.S.
- Education: Hampden–Sydney College (BA); William & Mary Law School (JD)

Richard Y. AtLee Jr. (born 1971) is a Judge of the Virginia Court of Appeals.

== Life and education ==
AtLee was born in 1971 in Newport News, Virginia. He received his Bachelor of Arts from Hampden–Sydney College and his Juris Doctor from William & Mary Law School.

AtLee married his wife, Caitlin, on June 25, 2016.

== Legal career ==
After graduating law school, he passed the Virginia State Bar in 1996 and worked in his grandfather's law firm alongside his father until he was appointed to the Juvenile and Domestic Relations District Court bench in 2006. His mother worked in the same district as AtLee while he sat on the York-Poquoson Juvenile and Domestic Relations District Court bench from 2006 to 2011. He was appointed to the circuit court by the General Assembly in 2011.

== Service on Virginia Court of Appeals ==
He was elected by the General Assembly on January 20, 2015, to an eight-year term beginning February 1, 2015. His current term expires in on January 31, 2023.

Legal offices
| Unknown | Judge of the Virginia Court of Appeals; 2015–present | Incumbent |
