= Mary Grace O'Brien =

American judge (born 1958)

Judge of the Virginia Court of Appeals
- Incumbent
- Assumed office February 1, 2015
- Appointed by: Virginia General Assembly

Personal details
- Born: 1958 (age 67–68) Buffalo, New York
- Education: Le Moyne College (B.A.); Washington and Lee University School of Law, (J.D.)

Mary Grace O'Brien (born 1958) is a Judge of the Virginia Court of Appeals.

== Life and education ==
O'Brien was born in 1958 in Buffalo, New York. She received her Bachelor of Arts from Le Moyne College and her Juris Doctor from Washington and Lee University School of Law.

== Legal career ==
She clerked for the Honorable Roscoe B. Stephenson Jr. of the Supreme Court of Virginia for two years. Then Prince William County Commonwealth’s Attorney Paul Ebert hired her in 1985. In 2001, she was elevated to the Juvenile and Domestic Relations District Court for PWC, and in 2008, she was elevated to be the first female Circuit Court Judge in the 31st Judicial Circuit.

== Service on Virginia Court of Appeals ==
She was elected by the General Assembly on January 22, 2015, to an eight-year term beginning February 1, 2015. On June 15, 2015 she was invested as the 37th Judge of the Court of Appeals of Virginia. Her current term expires January 31, 2023.

Legal offices
Unknown	Judge of the Virginia Court of Appeals; 2015–present	Incumbent
