= University of Dayton School of Law =

Private law school in Dayton, Ohio, US

Coordinates: 39°44′26.16″N 84°10′47.28″W

- Established: 1922 Reestablished 1974
- School type: Private
- Dean: Christopher Roederer
- Location: Dayton, Ohio, United States
- Enrollment: 377
- USNWR ranking: 107th (2025)
- Bar pass rate: 86.49% (2023) First Time Takers
- Website: Dayton Law home
- ABA profile: ABA Profile

The University of Dayton School of Law (UDSL) is a private law school located in Dayton, Ohio at Keller Hall. It is affiliated with the University of Dayton, which is a Catholic university of the Society of Mary. The school is accredited by the American Bar Association and is a member of the Association of American Law Schools.

The school's 2024 class is made up of students from across the country, with 51% coming from places other than Ohio, and the average student LSAT score being 156 and GPA being 3.66. For 2023, the first time bar examination pass rate was 86.49%.

== History ==
The School of Law was first established as the University of Dayton College of Law in 1922 under the guidance of Dean John C. Shea, the former first assistant director of law for Dayton. The college’s first class included two women and one African American. Economic issues during the Great Depression led the law school to close its doors in 1935.

The law school reopened in September 1974 under its current name. In July 1997, the school's current location, Joseph E. Keller Hall, was opened.

== Curriculum ==
=== Online Hybrid Juris Doctor (JD) Program ===
Through a hybrid J.D. program, students are able to take most of their classes online, coming to campus for only a weekend each semester. The program received approval from the American Bar Association and started in 2019.

=== Program In Law And Technology (PILT) ===
In 1989, the law school created the Program in Law and Technology (PILT), one of the first programs of its kind in the country. PILT offers courses in patent law, copyright and trademark law, business dimensions of intellectual property law, cyberspace law, entertainment law and the impact of technology on the practice of law. Collaborations with Emerson and LexisNexis provide hands-on experience in areas of data security and privacy, product liability, regulation and developing new legal products and services.

=== Human Rights Collaborative ===
Through a partnership with the University of Dayton's Human Rights Center, law school students and faculty can work to protect the rights of vulnerable citizens across the world. The collaborative features a course on human rights and joint-research projects between the law school and the center.

=== Hanley Sustainability Collaborative ===
Through a partnership with the University of Dayton's Hanley Sustainability Institute, students learn about issues surrounding the law and sustainability.

=== Concentrations ===
The law school offers students the ability to take concentrations in seven different areas: Business Law & Compliance, Civil Advocacy & Dispute Resolution, Criminal Law, Human & Civil Rights Law, Law & Sustainability, Law & Technology and Personal & Family Law. The concentrations allow students to develop their skills and knowledge in those specific areas in an effort to give them better training in the field they plan to enter.

=== Non-J.D. Programs ===
The law school offers both Master of Laws (LL.M.) and Master in the Study of Law (M.S.L.) degrees.

==== M.S.L. ====
Through the M.S.L. program students are provided with an overview of the legal field and how it impacts various career fields.

==== Government Contracting M.S.L. ====
In the Government Contracting and Procurement Program students learn the skills necessary to enter or advance in the contracting and procurement field.

==== Online LL.M. ====
The Online LL.M. allows students to earn their second degree in law online without taking classes at the law school's campus.

==== On Campus LL.M. ====
Through the On Campus LL.M. students attend the law school to earn their second degree in law.

==== Korea Program ====
In the Korea Program, professors from the law school go to Korea to teach students about U.S. law.

== Notable alumni ==
- Hon. Frank Caruso '82 - 8th Judicial District, Niagara County, Supreme Court Justice
- Hon. Beth Ann Buchanan '97 - U.S. Bankruptcy Judge, Southern District of Ohio
- Michael B. Coleman '80 - First African-American Mayor of Columbus, Ohio.
- Hon. Mary Donovan '77 - Ohio 2nd District Court of Appeals Judge
- Hon. Frank P. Geraci Jr. '77 - Chief U.S. District Judge- Western District of New York
- Martin Hamlette '02 - Executive Director, National Medical Association
- David P. Joyce '82 - U.S. House of Representatives, Ohio 14th Congressional District
- Hon. Elizabeth A. McClanahan '84 - Virginia Supreme Court Justice
- Jeff Rezabek '97 - former Montgomery County Juvenile Court Judge; Served in Ohio House of Representatives, 43rd District
- Douglas J. Swearingen, Jr., '12 - Ohio House of Representatives, 89th District
- Timothy Young '92 - Ohio Public Defender

== Notable faculty ==
- Vipal J. Patel, acting US Attorney for the Southern District of Ohio

== Notable attendees ==
- John Meehan, the antagonist of the true-crime podcast and eponymous TV series Dirty John

== Post-Graduation Employment ==
According to Dayton Law's official 2025 ABA-required disclosures, 89.8% of the Class of 2024 obtained full-time, long-term, bar passage-required or J.D. preferred employment ten months after graduation, excluding solo-practitioners, with 79.6% obtaining bar passage-required employment (i.e. as attorneys).

Ohio was the primary employment destination for 2024 Dayton Law graduates, with 57.4% of employed 2024 graduates working in the state.

== Costs ==
Tuition at Dayton Law for traditional first-year residential students is $40,020 for the 2025-2026 academic year. Books and supplies are estimated at $1,500. Living and personal expenses are estimated at $16,180. The total cost of attendance at Dayton Law for the 2025-2026 academic year is $61,809. Total tuition for the 2025-2026 academic year for first-year Online Hybrid students is $30,455.

U.S. News & World Report estimated the average indebtedness of 2016 Dayton Law graduates at $108,724.

Law School Transparency lists net tuition for Dayton Law at $12,893 for 2018-2019.
