= Christian Compton =

American judge (1929–2006)

A. Christian Compton

Justice of the Supreme Court of Virginia
- In office October 1, 1974 – February 2, 2000
- Preceded by: Harold F. Snead
- Succeeded by: Donald W. Lemons

Personal details
- Born: Asbury Christian Compton; October 24, 1929 Ashland, Virginia, U.S.
- Died: April 9, 2006 (aged 76) Richmond, Virginia, U.S.
- Resting place: Hollywood Cemetery
- Spouse: Betty Stephenson
- Education: Washington & Lee University

Asbury Christian Compton (October 24, 1929 – April 9, 2006) was an American attorney and judge who served as a justice of the Supreme Court of Virginia from 1974 until 2000, and as a Senior justice until his death.

Compton was a native of Ashland in Hanover County, Virginia, and graduated from Ashland High School in 1946. Compton earned his B.A. in history and politics from Washington and Lee in 1950 and his LL.B. from the Washington and Lee University School of Law in 1953. While at Washington and Lee, Compton served as president of Phi Kappa Sigma fraternity, class officer and captain of the basketball team. He was also a member of Omicron Delta Kappa, the lacrosse team, Phi Alpha Delta legal fraternity, the University Glee Club and the Cotillion Club.

Compton served in the U.S. Navy from 1953 to 1956 and the U.S. Naval Reserve from 1953 to 1961. He practiced law in Richmond with May, Garrett, Miller, Newman and Compton from 1957 to 1966.

In 1966, Gov. Mills Godwin appointed Compton to the Law & Equity Court of the City of Richmond and then to the Supreme Court of Virginia in 1974. The General Assembly re-elected him to another term in 1987. He retired from the Supreme Court in February 2000 and began service as a senior justice.

Compton maintained strong ties to Washington and Lee throughout his career. He served as president of the Alumni Association from 1972 to 1973. He received an Honorary Doctorate of Laws from his alma mater in 1975. He served member of the Board of Trustees from 1978 to 1989. He selected most of his law clerks from the top graduates of Washington and Lee School of Law.

Compton was married to Betty Stephenson Compton for 52 years until his death. They had three daughters—Leigh Compton Kiczales, Mary Compton Psyllos, Melissa Compton Patterson; and eight grandsons-Nicholas Kiczales, Luke Kiczales, Noah Stephenson Kiczales, Thomas Psyllos, Christian Psyllos, Daniel Patterson, James Patterson, and Henry Patterson. He was buried in Hollywood Cemetery in Richmond.
