= William G. Petty =

American judge from Virginia

Judge of the Virginia Court of Appeals
- Incumbent
- Assumed office March 16, 2006
- Appointed by: Virginia General Assembly

Personal details
- Born: 1949 (age 76–77) Santa Monica, California
- Education: College of William & Mary (B.A.); William & Mary Law School (J.D.)

William G. Petty (born 1949) is a Judge of the Virginia Court of Appeals.

== Life and education ==
Petty was born in 1949 in Santa Monica, California. He received his Bachelor of Arts from College of William & Mary and his Juris Doctor from William & Mary Law School.

== Legal career ==
Prior to his selection to the court Petty served as Lynchburg Commonwealth's Attorney for over two decades.

== Service on Virginia Court of Appeals ==
He was first elected by the General Assembly on March 10, 2006, to an eight-year term beginning March 16, 2006. He was then subsequently elected to a second eight-year term in 2014. His current term expires in on March 3, 2022.

Legal offices
Unknown	Judge of the Virginia Court of Appeals; 2006–present	Incumbent
