= Lawrence L. Koontz Jr. =

American judge (1940–2025)

Lawrence Koontz

Justice of the Supreme Court of Virginia
- In office August 16, 1995 – February 1, 2011
- Preceded by: Henry H. Whiting
- Succeeded by: Elizabeth A. McClanahan

2nd Chief Judge of the Virginia Court of Appeals
- In office April 1, 1985 – April 30, 1993
- Preceded by: E. Ballard Baker
- Succeeded by: Norman K. Moon

Judge of the Virginia Court of Appeals
- In office January 1, 1985 – August 15, 1995
- Preceded by: Seat established
- Succeeded by: Nelson Overton

Personal details
- Born: Lawrence Larkins Koontz Jr. January 25, 1940 Roanoke, Virginia, U.S.
- Died: March 16, 2025 (aged 85) Salem, Virginia, U.S.
- Spouse: Eberle Smith
- Children: 3
- Education: Virginia Tech (BS); University of Richmond (JD)

Lawrence Larkins Koontz Jr. (January 25, 1940 – March 16, 2025) was an American judge who was Justice of the Supreme Court of Virginia. Justice Koontz served at every level of court in the Virginia judicial system, having ascended to the bench after a serving as an Assistant Commonwealth's Attorney in Roanoke and a brief period of private practice when he was appointed to the Juvenile Court of the City of Roanoke (later the 23rd District Juvenile and Domestic Relations District Court following the reform of the Virginia Court System) in 1968. He was elected by the General Assembly to the 23rd Circuit Court in 1976. Justice Koontz judicial career spanned 57 years including his service in Senior Status with the Supreme Court, one of the longest judicial careers of a Virginia Jurist.

== Judicial career ==
Prior to being made a Supreme Court justice, Koontz was an original member of the Virginia Court of Appeals, serving as its second chief judge for two four year terms following the death of chief judge E. Ballard Baker a few months after the Court was created. Prior to his appointment to the Court of Appeals, Koontz served as a judge of the 23rd Judicial Circuit of Virginia and the Roanoke Juvenile Court. He attended Virginia Polytechnic Institute and State University where he received a Bachelor of Science in Biology and was a member of the Corps of Cadets. He received his Juris Doctor degree from University of Richmond School of Law.

Among Koontz's more controversial opinions was Arlington County v. White, in which the Court determined that a local government could not extend employee health benefits to non-related persons living with the employee, including same-sex partners. Writing for the majority, Koontz applied the "Dillon Rule" that prohibits local governments in Virginia from going beyond the authority delegated to them by the state government. As expressed in a concurring opinion by Justice Cynthia D. Kinser, the majority declined to address whether the County's action was an attempt to recognize same-sex marriage, as was argued in a separate concurring opinion written by Justice Leroy Rountree Hassell Sr., who was joined by two other justices. Despite the legal justification of the majority for striking down the policy, the opinion is nonetheless viewed as controversial in the Gay and Lesbian Community.

Koontz also authored one of the two dissents in the Supreme Court of Virginia's opinion in Atkins v. Commonwealth. When the case was subsequently reversed by the United States Supreme Court, the majority opinion in that Court quoted from Justice Koontz's dissent, along with the dissent by Justice Hassell. Specifically, the Court cited Justice Koontz's observation that "it is indefensible to conclude that individuals who are mentally retarded are not to some degree less culpable for their criminal acts. By definition, such individuals have substantial limitations not shared by the general population. A moral and civilized society diminishes itself if its system of justice does not afford recognition and consideration of those limitations in a meaningful way."

In a 2008 dissent in the death penalty case of Porter v. Commonwealth, Koontz, responding to the majority's use of procedural default to excuse the trial court's gross abuse of power in presiding over the trial in a different jurisdiction without a proper order of designation, observed that "[i]f the courts empowered to sit in judgment over those accused of typically heinous crimes fail to take the greatest care in assuring the fairness of the proceedings that result in the imposition of the death penalty, then it must inevitably follow in time that the death penalty statutes of this Commonwealth will no longer pass constitutional muster." This statement was widely quoted in the media and reflects Justice Koontz's growing frustration with the manner in which the death penalty is administered in Virginia.

== Death ==
Koontz died in Salem, Virginia, on March 16, 2025, at the age of 85. He was survived by his wife, 2 daughters, 1 son, and many grandchildren.

== Collected opinions ==
Koontz's collected opinions have been published in a seven volume set with the final volume being released in July 2017. Lawrence L. Koontz Jr. (2011), Jurist Prudent -- The Judicial Opinions of Lawrence L. Koontz Jr., Volume 1, Salem, Virginia, USA: Salem/Roanoke County Bar Association, OL 24619284M Lawrence L. Koontz Jr. (2011), Jurist Prudent -- The Judicial Opinions of Lawrence L. Koontz Jr., Volume 2, Salem, Virginia, USA: Salem/Roanoke County Bar Association, OL 24619285M
