= Court of Appeals of Virginia =

US state appeals court

- Interactive map of Court of Appeals of Virginia
- Established: 1985
- Location: Virginia
- Composition method: Legislative election
- Authorised by: Va. Code § 17.1–400
- Appeals to: Supreme Court of Virginia
- Judge term length: 8 years
- Number of positions: 21
- Website: Court of Appeals

Chief Judge
- Currently: Marla Graff Decker
- Since: 2019
- Lead position ends: -

The Court of Appeals of Virginia, established January 1, 1985, is an intermediate appellate court of 21 judges that hears appeals from decisions of Virginia's circuit courts and the Virginia Workers' Compensation Commission. The Court sits in panels of at least three judges, and sometimes hears cases en banc. Appeals from the Court of Appeals go to the Supreme Court of Virginia.

== History ==
A 1971 Virginia Court System Study Commission stated the need for a unified court system to handle appeals. The Court of Appeals of Virginia was established on January 1, 1985, as an intermediate court of limited appellate jurisdiction, initially with ten judges, with an eleventh judge added in 2000.

In March 2021, legislation was passed to expand the jurisdiction and composition of the Court from 11 judges to 17 judges, coming into effect July 1, 2021. The Court was further expanded to 21 judges, effective September 1, 2026.

== Judges ==
The Court of Appeals consists of 17 judges who are elected for eight-year terms by a majority of the members of each house of the General Assembly. The Court of Appeals may designate seven retired judges of the Court to serve as senior judges.

== Jurisdiction ==
=== Reforms effective January 2022 ===
As part of a comprehensive reform bill passed by the Virginia General Assembly and signed into law in March 2021, the jurisdiction of the Court of Appeals expanded on January 1, 2022, as follows:

- Litigants can now appeal as of right a lower court's decision in civil cases, and the Supreme Court of Virginia will retain the power to select which appeals it hears.
- Criminal defendants can now appeal as of right a lower court's decision in criminal cases, but the Commonwealth will still need to petition the Court of Appeals if it wishes to appeal a decision in a criminal case.
- The Court of Appeals now has jurisdiction to hear interlocutory appeals and petitions for review of injunctions.

An appeal filed with the Supreme Court of Virginia before January 1, 2022, remains under its jurisdiction.

== Procedure ==
Since January 1, 2022, when the court's jurisdiction expanded, most appeals are initiated by filing a timely notice of appeal in the tribunal whose order is being appealed and a copy with the clerk of the Court of Appeals.

Decisions are issued by the Court of Appeals by written opinion or order.

== Current composition ==
As of January 1, 2025:

=== Active ===
Name	Born	Start	Term ends	Mandatory retirement	Law school
Marla Graff Decker, Chief Judge	May 31, 1958 (age 68)	November 1, 2013	January 31, 2030	February 3, 2032	Richmond
Randy Beales	February 10, 1960 (age 66)	April 16, 2006	April 16, 2030	January 31, 2034	Virginia
Mary O'Brien	October 28, 1958 (age 67)	February 1, 2015	January 31, 2031	February 3, 2032	Washington and Lee
Richard AtLee	September 15, 1971 (age 54)	February 1, 2015	January 31, 2031	January 31, 2045	William and Mary
Mary Malveaux	September 2, 1967 (age 59)	April 16, 2016	April 15, 2032	January 29, 2041	Richmond
Clay Athey	September 1, 1960 (age 66)	September 1, 2019	August 31, 2027	January 31, 2034	Dayton
Daniel Ortiz	May 19, 1977 (age 49)	September 1, 2021	August 31, 2029	January 31, 2051	GWU
Doris Causey	1970 (age 55–56)	September 1, 2021	August 31, 2029	February 2, 2044	TSU
Frank Friedman	December 4, 1958 (age 67)	September 1, 2021	August 31, 2029	February 3, 2032	Vanderbilt
Vernida Chaney	1978 (age 47–48)	September 1, 2021	August 31, 2029	January 30, 2052	Howard
Stuart Raphael	September 29, 1964 (age 61)	September 1, 2021	August 31, 2029	February 2, 2038	Virginia
Lisa Lorish	1980 (age 45–46)	September 1, 2021	August 31, 2029	February 3, 2054	Virginia
Dominique Callins	March 11, 1979 (age 47)	November 1, 2021	October 31, 2029	January 28, 2053	William and Mary
Kimberly White	July 18, 1963 (age 63)	July 1, 2022	June 30, 2030	February 3, 2037	Mercer
Steven C. Frucci	February 2, 1966 (age 60)	March 16, 2024	March 15, 2032	January 31, 2040	UNC
David Bernhard	1962 (age 63–64)	January 1, 2025	December 31, 2032	January 29, 2036	Wash U
Kevin Duffan	1979 (age 46–47)	January 1, 2026	December 31, 2033	January 28, 2053	William and Mary
Vacant					
Vacant					
Vacant					
Vacant					

=== Senior ===
Name	Active Service	Chief Term	Senior Start
Rosemarie Annunziata	1995–2004	——	2005
Jean Clements	2000–2008	——	2009
William Petty	2006–2021	——	2021
Robert Humphreys	2008–2023	——	2024

== Chief judges ==
Judge	Chief
E. Ballard Baker	1985
Lawrence L. Koontz, Jr.	1985–1993
Norman K. Moon	1993–1997
Johanna L. Fitzpatrick	1997–2006
Walter S. Felton, Jr.	2006–2014
Glen A. Huff	2015–2019
Marla Graff Decker	2019–
