= List of made-for-television films with LGBTQ characters =

The following is a list of made-for-television films that include fictional and factual lesbian, gay, bisexual, or transgender characters. The orientation can be portrayed on-screen, described in the dialogue or mentioned. The films premiered on terrestrial and cable television networks.

(For queer characters — non-binary, gender fluid, pansexual, etc. — see lists for asexual, intersex, non-binary, and pansexual characters.)

== 1950s ==
Year	Title	Network	Character(s)	Actor(s)	Identity	Notes	Ref(s)
1959	South	ITV	Jan Wicziewsky	Peter Wyngarde	Gay	Wicziewsky is a Polish army officer living in exile in the antebellum South. He is torn by his feelings for fellow officer Eric MacClure (Graydon Gould). South is believed to be the earliest television film dealing with homosexual themes.	

== 1970s ==
=== 1970–1974 ===
Year	Title	Network	Character(s)	Actor(s)	Identity	Notes	Ref(s)
1971	Vanished	NBC	Arnold Greer	Arthur Hill	Gay	A presidential adviser goes missing, and the FBI investigation into his disappearance reveals that he is secretly gay and has been having secret weekly meetings with another man in a rented apartment. Loosely inspired by the scandal that forced President Johnson's aid Walter Jenkins to resign in 1964.	
1972	The Glass House	CBS	Hugo Slocum	Vic Morrow	Gay	Hugo is an inmate in the prison.	
1972	That Certain Summer	ABC	Doug Salter	Hal Holbrook	Gay	Doug is divorced and living with his partner Gary McClain. While his ex-wife knows he is gay, his teenaged son Nick (Scott Jacoby) doesn't. When Nick goes to visit his father for the weekend, Doug comes out to him. Nick is upset and confused, and packs his bags and goes home to his mother, without even saying goodbye to his father.	
1972	That Certain Summer	ABC	Gary McClain	Martin Sheen	Gay	Doug is divorced and living with his partner Gary McClain. While his ex-wife knows he is gay, his teenaged son Nick (Scott Jacoby) doesn't. When Nick goes to visit his father for the weekend, Doug comes out to him. Nick is upset and confused, and packs his bags and goes home to his mother, without even saying goodbye to his father.	
1973	Applause	PBS	Duane Fox	Harvey Evans	Gay	Televised production of 1970 Broadway musical Applause. In one scene, Margo Channing goes to a gay bar in Greenwich Village with her pal, Duane, and performs the song "But Alive" with patrons of the bar.	
1973	Scream, Pretty Peggy	ABC	Jeffrey Elliot	Ted Bessell	Transvestite	Jeffrey is a killer.	
1973	Steambath	PBS	Young Man #1; Young Man # 2	Neil J. Schwartz; Patrick Spohn	Gay	Filmed production of the off-Broadway show that aired on PBS in 1973. One scene contained two gay men singing the provocative "Let Me Entertain You" as they slowly remove their towels throughout the number. The controversial production included the first woman (Valerie Perrine) to be shown topless on public television and only 24 PBS affiliates aired the program.	
1974	Born Innocent	NBC	Moco	Nora Heflin	Lesbian	14-year-old runaway, Christine Parker (Linda Blair), is sentenced to do time in a girls' juvenile detention center. In a controversial scene, Christine is raped with a plunger handle by a gang led by Moco. The film made several negative references to lesbianism, with one version of the script containing a character description of Moco, implying that her lesbianism was a result of her surroundings, and what prompts her abuse of Christine and others.	

=== 1975–1979 ===
Year	Title	Network	Character(s)	Actor(s)	Identity	Notes	Ref(s)
1975	The Naked Civil Servant	ITV	Quentin Crisp	John Hurt	Gay	Biographical film about the life and times of openly gay and flamboyant Quentin Crisp. The film depicts his life from coming of age to growing old in conservative England. Based on the 1968 book of the same name.	
1975	Cage Without a Key	NBC	Tommy	Jonelle Allen	Lesbian	Tommy is a black teenager in a juvenile detention center. She sacrifices her life for a wrongly imprisoned white girl, Valerie Smith.	
1976	Dawn: Portrait of a Teenage Runaway	NBC	Alexander Duncan	Leigh McCloskey	Bisexual	Alexander is a hustler.	
1976	James Dean	NBC	James Dean	Stephen McHattie	Bisexual	Biopic about Dean based on the biography by Bast, Dean's good friend and roommate during the 1950s. The movie featured several homoerotic scenes between Dean and Bast. In one scene, Dean talks with Bast about being open to gay encounters. In the film's final scene, Bast tells his therapist that he never got the chance to tell Dean how much he loved him.	
1976	James Dean	NBC	William Bast	Michael Brandon	Gay	Biopic about Dean based on the biography by Bast, Dean's good friend and roommate during the 1950s. The movie featured several homoerotic scenes between Dean and Bast. In one scene, Dean talks with Bast about being open to gay encounters. In the film's final scene, Bast tells his therapist that he never got the chance to tell Dean how much he loved him.	
1976	Song of Myself	CBS	Walt Whitman	Rip Torn	Gay	The story begins with Whitman, a gay poet, in his 70s, sitting for photographs being taken by Thomas Eakins. His life is then depicted in flashbacks, with Whitman reading passages from his poetry on a voice-over soundtrack. It was broadcast as part of CBS‐TV's "American Parade" series.	
1976	Song of Myself	CBS	Peter Doyle	Brad Davis	Gay	Peter Doyle is a young streetcar operator who becomes Whitman's lover for 10 years.	
1976	The War Widow	PBS	Amy	Pamela Bellwood	Bisexual	Set during World War I, Amy is married to a man who enlisted early. On a trip to New York City, she meets Jenny, a photographer. Their friendship blossoms into romance and they eventually become lovers.	
1976	The War Widow	PBS	Jenny	Frances Lee McCain	Lesbian	Set during World War I, Amy is married to a man who enlisted early. On a trip to New York City, she meets Jenny, a photographer. Their friendship blossoms into romance and they eventually become lovers.	
1977	Alexander: The Other Side of Dawn	NBC	Alexander Duncan	Leigh McCloskey	Bisexual	Alexander is a street hustler; only in it for the money, he sleeps with both men and women. At one point in the film he is a houseboy for a closeted gay pro football player. In the end, he reunites with his girlfriend Dawn, and they leave California and head up north. Sequel to the TV movie Dawn: Portrait of a Teenage Runaway.	
1977	Die Konsequenz	ARD	Martin Kurath	Jürgen Prochnow	Gay	Martin Kurath is an actor who is imprisoned. In jail, he begins a relationship with the jail warden's son Thomas.	
1977	Die Konsequenz	ARD	Thomas Manzoni	Ernst Hannawald	Gay	Martin Kurath is an actor who is imprisoned. In jail, he begins a relationship with the jail warden's son Thomas.	
1977	In the Glitter Palace	NBC	Ellen Lange	Barbara Hershey	Lesbian	Ellen hires her ex-boyfriend to defend her lover Casey, who is accused of murder. Daisy is a nightclub entertainer. Ricky is hiding a child she lost in a custody suit. Grace was hired to seduce women so they can be blackmailed. Kendis is a judge and another blackmail victim.	
1977	In the Glitter Palace	NBC	Casey Walker	Diana Scarwid	Lesbian	Ellen hires her ex-boyfriend to defend her lover Casey, who is accused of murder. Daisy is a nightclub entertainer. Ricky is hiding a child she lost in a custody suit. Grace was hired to seduce women so they can be blackmailed. Kendis is a judge and another blackmail victim.	
1977	In the Glitter Palace	NBC	Daisy Dolon	Carole Cook	Lesbian	Ellen hires her ex-boyfriend to defend her lover Casey, who is accused of murder. Daisy is a nightclub entertainer. Ricky is hiding a child she lost in a custody suit. Grace was hired to seduce women so they can be blackmailed. Kendis is a judge and another blackmail victim.	
1977	In the Glitter Palace	NBC	Ricky	Lynn Marta	Lesbian	Ellen hires her ex-boyfriend to defend her lover Casey, who is accused of murder. Daisy is a nightclub entertainer. Ricky is hiding a child she lost in a custody suit. Grace was hired to seduce women so they can be blackmailed. Kendis is a judge and another blackmail victim.	
1977	In the Glitter Palace	NBC	Grace Mayo	Tisha Sterling	Lesbian	Ellen hires her ex-boyfriend to defend her lover Casey, who is accused of murder. Daisy is a nightclub entertainer. Ricky is hiding a child she lost in a custody suit. Grace was hired to seduce women so they can be blackmailed. Kendis is a judge and another blackmail victim.	
1977	In the Glitter Palace	NBC	Kendis Winslow	Salome Jens |	Lesbian	Ellen hires her ex-boyfriend to defend her lover Casey, who is accused of murder. Daisy is a nightclub entertainer. Ricky is hiding a child she lost in a custody suit. Grace was hired to seduce women so they can be blackmailed. Kendis is a judge and another blackmail victim.	
1977	Terraces	NBC	Dr. Roger Cabe	Lloyd Bochner	Gay	A married doctor has an affair with Alex, an actor. When Roger breaks it off for the sake of his wife and family, Alex has a hard time accepting the break-up and swallows a bottle of pills. Roger suspects that Alex may have attempted suicide, so he and other tenants of the building where they live break into his apartment and find him unconscious. Roger forces Alex to drink coffee until he wakes up, and in the end, Roger moves in with Alex.	
1977	Terraces	NBC	Alex Bengston	James Phipps	Gay	A married doctor has an affair with Alex, an actor. When Roger breaks it off for the sake of his wife and family, Alex has a hard time accepting the break-up and swallows a bottle of pills. Roger suspects that Alex may have attempted suicide, so he and other tenants of the building where they live break into his apartment and find him unconscious. Roger forces Alex to drink coffee until he wakes up, and in the end, Roger moves in with Alex.	
1978	A Question of Love	ABC	Linda Ray Guettner	Gena Rowlands	Lesbian	Linda Ray is a divorced nurse with two kids. She moves in with Barbara and they are in a relationship. Linda's teenaged son tells his father about his mother and Barbara's relationship. The ex-husband then sues for custody of the younger boy, because the teenager had already moved back in with his dad. When they go to trial, Linda loses custody of her young son. Based on the true story of Mary Jo Risher, who in 1975 lost custody of her 9-year-old son because she was in a lesbian relationship.	
1978	A Question of Love	ABC	Barbara Moreland	Jane Alexander	Lesbian	Linda Ray is a divorced nurse with two kids. She moves in with Barbara and they are in a relationship. Linda's teenaged son tells his father about his mother and Barbara's relationship. The ex-husband then sues for custody of the younger boy, because the teenager had already moved back in with his dad. When they go to trial, Linda loses custody of her young son. Based on the true story of Mary Jo Risher, who in 1975 lost custody of her 9-year-old son because she was in a lesbian relationship.	
1978	Sergeant Matlovich vs. the U.S. Air Force	NBC	Leonard Matlovich	Brad Dourif	Gay	The true story of Leonard Matlovich, a U.S. Air Force sergeant who was dismissed from the Air Force for being gay and the story of his fight to be reinstated.	

== 1980s ==
=== 1980–1984 ===
Year	Title	Network	Character(s)	Actor(s)	Identity	Notes	Ref(s)
1980	From the Life of the Marionettes	ZDF	Tim	Walter Schmidinger	Gay	Tim is Katarina's friend and business partner.	
1980	Marilyn: The Untold Story	ABC	Natasha Lytess	Viveca Lindfors	Lesbian	The film explores the star's bond with Natasha Lytess.	
1980	The Shadow Box	ABC	Brian	Christopher Plummer	Bisexual	Brian is a married man who falls in love with another man named Mark in this TV film directed by Paul Newman and subsequently nominated for three Emmy awards.	
1980	The Women's Room	ABC	Iso	Tovah Feldshuh	Lesbian	Iso is a divorcee and a friend of the main character, Mira. This television film received highly favorable reviews and was nominated for four Emmy awards.	
1981	Inmates: A Love Story	ABC	Salt	Rita Taggart	Lesbian	Salt and Pepper are a biracial couple in the jail.	
1981	Inmates: A Love Story	ABC	Pepper	Cynthia Avila	Lesbian	Salt and Pepper are a biracial couple in the jail.	
1981	The Running Man	CBC	Ben Garfield	Chuck Shamata	Gay	Ben Garfield is married with two kids, a teacher, and is closeted. Michael is his best friend.	
1981	The Running Man	CBC	Michael	Don Scanlon	Gay	Ben Garfield is married with two kids, a teacher, and is closeted. Michael is his best friend.	
1981	Sidney Shorr: A Girl's Best Friend	NBC	Sidney Shorr	Tony Randall	Gay	Sidney Shorr is a reclusive illustrator. He meets and befriends Laurie Morgan, a cheerful, forthright woman who spends the night in his apartment. Sidney's sexuality is clear to Laurie from his wistful gaze toward a man's photo positioned on the mantle. Since Sidney can no longer afford his apartment alone, Laurie moves in; she eventually gets pregnant, and they raise the child together. TV movie that was the pilot for the series Love, Sidney.	
1981	Valley of the Dolls	CBS	Vivienne Moray	Camilla Sparv	Lesbian	Vivienne is a Parisian artist.	
1982	Fifth of July	Showtime	Kenneth Talley Jr.	Richard Thomas	Gay	Kenneth Talley Jr. is a paraplegic Vietnam veteran living in his childhood home in Lebanon, Missouri. Jed Jenkins is a gardener and Kenneth's boyfriend. Ken hosts a reunion of his old UC Berkeley college friends, and they muse about days gone by and what the future holds for them. Based on the play of the same name.	
1982	Fifth of July	Showtime	Jed Jenkins	Jeff Daniels	Gay	Kenneth Talley Jr. is a paraplegic Vietnam veteran living in his childhood home in Lebanon, Missouri. Jed Jenkins is a gardener and Kenneth's boyfriend. Ken hosts a reunion of his old UC Berkeley college friends, and they muse about days gone by and what the future holds for them. Based on the play of the same name.	
1983	An American Family Revisited: The Louds 10 Years Later	HBO	Himself	Lance Loud	Gay	Follow-up reunion film to the 1973 PBS series An American Family, which included gay son, Lance.	
1983	An Englishman Abroad	BBC	Guy Burgess	Alan Bates	Gay	Story of the chance encounter between Guy, a Cambridge spy, and actress Coral Browne. The film is based on real-life events; The Cambridge Spy Ring.	
1983	Family Business	PBS	Jerry Stern	Jeff Marcus	Gay	Jerry is the youngest son of a wealthy man who is dying and wants to make amends with his four sons.	
1983	Making of a Male Model	ABC	Chuck Lanyard	Jeff Conaway	Gay	Chuck Lanyard is a washed-out model. He can't even land a gig standing next to a car at an auto show, because he's too old. He eventually dies from a drug overdose.	
1983	Trackdown: Finding the Goodbar Killer	CBS	Alan Cahill	Barton Heyman	Gay	Alan is the lover of John, who murdered Mary Alice Nolan. After John flees from New York to Florida to avoid being caught, Alan agrees to help the police locate him. The film is loosely based on the investigation surrounding the murder of Roseann Quinn.	
1983	Trackdown: Finding the Goodbar Killer	CBS	John Charles Turner	Shannon Presby	Gay	Alan is the lover of John, who murdered Mary Alice Nolan. After John flees from New York to Florida to avoid being caught, Alan agrees to help the police locate him. The film is loosely based on the investigation surrounding the murder of Roseann Quinn.	
1984	Cat on a Hot Tin Roof	Showtime	Brick Pollitt	Tommy Lee Jones	Gay	Brick, an alcoholic former Southern football hero, pines for his dead best friend, Skipper; while being indifferent towards his wife, Maggie. This production restored the homosexual undertones of the original play that were diluted in the 1958 feature film version.	
1984	The Glitter Dome	HBO	Lorna Dillman	Colleen Dewhurst	Lesbian	Lorna is a film editor.	

=== 1985–1989 ===
Year	Title	Network	Character(s)	Actor(s)	Identity	Notes	Ref(s)
1985	An Early Frost	NBC	Michael Pierson	Aidan Quinn	Gay	Michael is a successful lawyer who returns to his parents home to reveal he has AIDS. His father refuses to accept that reality, until Michael has seizures and an ambulance is called, which refuses to transport him. After Michael gets out of the hospital, his ex-lover, Peter, who gave him the disease, arrives and talks Michael out of suicide. One of the first mainstream treatments of AIDS on American television.	
1985	An Early Frost	NBC	Peter Hilton	D. W. Moffett	Gay	Michael is a successful lawyer who returns to his parents home to reveal he has AIDS. His father refuses to accept that reality, until Michael has seizures and an ambulance is called, which refuses to transport him. After Michael gets out of the hospital, his ex-lover, Peter, who gave him the disease, arrives and talks Michael out of suicide. One of the first mainstream treatments of AIDS on American television.	
1985	Consenting Adult	ABC	Jeff Lynd	Barry Tubb	Gay	Jeff is a college student, and his parents struggle to accept his homosexuality. When they refuse to accept him, he cuts them out of his life. Stuart is his boyfriend who he lives with after getting kicked out of his college dorm by his roommate. Based on the 1975 novel of the same name.	
1985	Consenting Adult	ABC	Stuart	Joseph Adams	Gay	Jeff is a college student, and his parents struggle to accept his homosexuality. When they refuse to accept him, he cuts them out of his life. Stuart is his boyfriend who he lives with after getting kicked out of his college dorm by his roommate. Based on the 1975 novel of the same name.	
1986	As Is	Showtime	Rich	Robert Carradine	Gay	Rich is a writer dying of AIDS. His former lover Saul returns to care for him. Based on the play of the same title. In 1986, Showtime's senior vice president said, "As Is is probably the frankest treatment of the homosexual life style ever seen on television".	
1986	As Is	Showtime	Saul	Jonathan Hadary	Gay	Rich is a writer dying of AIDS. His former lover Saul returns to care for him. Based on the play of the same title. In 1986, Showtime's senior vice president said, "As Is is probably the frankest treatment of the homosexual life style ever seen on television".	
1986	Dress Gray	NBC	David Hand	Patrick Cassidy	Gay	David is a cadet at the fictional Ulysses S. Grant Military Academy who is raped and murdered.	
1986	My Two Loves	ABC	Gail Springer	Mariette Hartley	Bisexual	After her husband dies, Gail finds a job as a chef for a company, where she meets Marjorie, an executive who is open about her sexuality. Their friendship becomes a love affair. The script was co-written by Rita Mae Brown.	
1986	My Two Loves	ABC	Marjorie	Lynn Redgrave	Lesbian	After her husband dies, Gail finds a job as a chef for a company, where she meets Marjorie, an executive who is open about her sexuality. Their friendship becomes a love affair. The script was co-written by Rita Mae Brown.	
1986	Second Serve	CBS	Renée Richards	Vanessa Redgrave	Transgender	Biopic of the surgeon turned professional tennis player, whose player status was challenged in 1976 when it was revealed that she was transgender. A New York State Superior Court judge ruled in Richard's favor, because her weight, height, and physique were comparable to a biological female, despite the high male chromosome count.	
1986	The Truth About Alex	HBO	Alex Prager	Peter Spence	Gay	Alex is a gifted pianist. He is also on the football team, and comes out to his best friend Brad, the quarterback, who tells him that it doesn't make any difference. When the word gets out that Alex is gay, both Brad and Alex face problems with their homophobic coach and teammates. In the end, they both defy the bigotry and remain best friends. Adapted from the novel Counterplay.	
1986	Welcome Home, Bobby	CBS	Bobby Cavalero	Timothy Williams	Gay	Bobby is a 16-year-old gay high school student who is arrested during a drug raid while in the company of Mark, an older man. After being released from jail, he struggles with rejection and bullying from his school friends and his father when his sexuality becomes known. Bobby finds a friend and support from Mr. Geffin, a teacher.	
1986	Welcome Home, Bobby	CBS	Mark Reed	Stephen James	Gay	Bobby is a 16-year-old gay high school student who is arrested during a drug raid while in the company of Mark, an older man. After being released from jail, he struggles with rejection and bullying from his school friends and his father when his sexuality becomes known. Bobby finds a friend and support from Mr. Geffin, a teacher.	
1986	Welcome Home, Bobby	CBS	Mr. Geffin	John Karlen	Gay	Bobby is a 16-year-old gay high school student who is arrested during a drug raid while in the company of Mark, an older man. After being released from jail, he struggles with rejection and bullying from his school friends and his father when his sexuality becomes known. Bobby finds a friend and support from Mr. Geffin, a teacher.	
1987	Two of Us	BBC	Matthew	Jason Rush	Gay	Matthew has a sexual relationship with Phil. In the end, Phil and Matthew decide to run off together to the coastal resort of Seaford on the Sussex coast. In the hostile atmosphere of Section 28, a nervous BBC first avoids showing Two of Us (part of BBC Schools TV series) at all, then does so, but only at 23.30.	
1987	Two of Us	BBC	Phil	Lee Whitlock	Gay	Matthew has a sexual relationship with Phil. In the end, Phil and Matthew decide to run off together to the coastal resort of Seaford on the Sussex coast. In the hostile atmosphere of Section 28, a nervous BBC first avoids showing Two of Us (part of BBC Schools TV series) at all, then does so, but only at 23.30.	
1988	Liberace: Behind the Music	CBS	Liberace	Victor Garber	Gay	One of two biopics released in 1988 depicting the performer's life.	
1988	Liberace	ABC	Liberace	Andrew Robinson	Gay	One of two biopics released in 1988 depicting the performer's life.	
1988	Tidy Endings	HBO	Arthur	Harvey Fierstein	Gay	Arthur, whose companion dies of A.I.D.S., confronts his lover's ex-wife and the two end up building a friendship while coping with the emotional aftermath of the death.	

== 1990s ==
=== 1990–1994 ===
Year	Title	Network	Character(s)	Actor(s)	Identity	Notes	Ref(s)
1990	Andre's Mother	PBS	Cal Porter	Richard Thomas	Gay	Cal was Andre's lover. He and Andre's mother reconcile at Andre's memorial service.	
1990	Rock Hudson	ABC	Rock Hudson	Thomas Ian Griffith	Gay	The film depicts the life of the closeted film star.	
1991	102 Boulevard Haussmann	BBC	Marcel Proust	Alan Bates	Gay	Set in 1916 during World War I, Proust lives a nocturnal, closeted life in Paris, obsessed with his writing and looked after by his devoted housekeeper. On a rare visit to a concert, he becomes fascinated by the music of a string quartet, which includes a young war veteran viola player whom he befriends. He invites the musicians to play in his apartment, where they perform César Franck's Quartet in D. Proust invites the young musician on numerous occasions to play for him, but he is unaware of the true nature of Proust's feelings.	
1991	The Greening of Ian Elliot	CBC	Ian Elliot	Anthony Bekenn	Gay	Ian is a newly ordained minister from Toronto assigned to a small Saskatchewan community. The residents are opposed to a dam that will destroy their river valley. He joins the opposition, but the residents also question the ordination of a gay minister to the church.	
1991	The Lost Language of Cranes	BBC; PBS	Philip Benjamin	Angus MacFadyen	Gay	Philip works in publishing. He decides to come out to his parents. Owen is Philip's closeted father. He makes clandestine visits to gay bars and gay adult cinemas. Elliot is Philip's boyfriend. He breaks up with him and moves to Paris. Geoffrey and Derek are the couple who raised Elliot. Robin is a middle-aged man who hooks up with Owen in a hotel. British production based on the novel by American writer David Leavitt.	
1991	The Lost Language of Cranes	BBC; PBS	Owen Benjamin	Brian Cox	Gay	Philip works in publishing. He decides to come out to his parents. Owen is Philip's closeted father. He makes clandestine visits to gay bars and gay adult cinemas. Elliot is Philip's boyfriend. He breaks up with him and moves to Paris. Geoffrey and Derek are the couple who raised Elliot. Robin is a middle-aged man who hooks up with Owen in a hotel. British production based on the novel by American writer David Leavitt.	
1991	The Lost Language of Cranes	BBC; PBS	Elliot Abrahams	Corey Parker	Gay	Philip works in publishing. He decides to come out to his parents. Owen is Philip's closeted father. He makes clandestine visits to gay bars and gay adult cinemas. Elliot is Philip's boyfriend. He breaks up with him and moves to Paris. Geoffrey and Derek are the couple who raised Elliot. Robin is a middle-aged man who hooks up with Owen in a hotel. British production based on the novel by American writer David Leavitt.	
1991	The Lost Language of Cranes	BBC; PBS	Geoffrey Lane	René Auberjonois	Gay	Philip works in publishing. He decides to come out to his parents. Owen is Philip's closeted father. He makes clandestine visits to gay bars and gay adult cinemas. Elliot is Philip's boyfriend. He breaks up with him and moves to Paris. Geoffrey and Derek are the couple who raised Elliot. Robin is a middle-aged man who hooks up with Owen in a hotel. British production based on the novel by American writer David Leavitt.	
1991	The Lost Language of Cranes	BBC; PBS	Derek Moulthorpe	John Schlesinger	Gay	Philip works in publishing. He decides to come out to his parents. Owen is Philip's closeted father. He makes clandestine visits to gay bars and gay adult cinemas. Elliot is Philip's boyfriend. He breaks up with him and moves to Paris. Geoffrey and Derek are the couple who raised Elliot. Robin is a middle-aged man who hooks up with Owen in a hotel. British production based on the novel by American writer David Leavitt.	
1991	The Lost Language of Cranes	BBC; PBS	Robin Bradley	Ben Daniels	Gay	Philip works in publishing. He decides to come out to his parents. Owen is Philip's closeted father. He makes clandestine visits to gay bars and gay adult cinemas. Elliot is Philip's boyfriend. He breaks up with him and moves to Paris. Geoffrey and Derek are the couple who raised Elliot. Robin is a middle-aged man who hooks up with Owen in a hotel. British production based on the novel by American writer David Leavitt.	
1991	Our Sons	ABC	Donald Barnes	Željko Ivanek	Gay	Donald is a young man dying of AIDS. His lover, James, asks his mother to go to Fayetteville, Arkansas and tell Donald's mother, who has been estranged from her son for years. Inspired by Micki Dickoff's 1987 documentary, Too Little, Too Late.	
1991	Our Sons	ABC	James Grant	Hugh Grant	Gay	Donald is a young man dying of AIDS. His lover, James, asks his mother to go to Fayetteville, Arkansas and tell Donald's mother, who has been estranged from her son for years. Inspired by Micki Dickoff's 1987 documentary, Too Little, Too Late.	
1991	A Question of Attribution	PBS	Anthony Blunt	James Fox	Gay	The film focuses on the British art expert and former Soviet agent.	
1992	Citizen Cohn	HBO	Roy Cohn	James Woods	Gay	Biopic about Cohn, who was closeted and Joseph McCarthy's controversial chief counsel, and played a significant role in the Senate Permanent Subcommittee on Investigations hearings. Cohn died from AIDS in 1986.	
1992	Doing Time on Maple Drive	Fox		William McNamara	Gay	Matt is closeted and engaged to a woman. After breaking off the engagement, he comes out to his family. Kyle has been his secret lover for the last three years.	
1992	Doing Time on Maple Drive	Fox	Kyle	Bennett Cale	Gay	Matt is closeted and engaged to a woman. After breaking off the engagement, he comes out to his family. Kyle has been his secret lover for the last three years.	
1992	Overkill: The Aileen Wuornos Story	CBS	Aileen Wuornos	Jean Smart	Lesbian	The film depicts the story of the street prostitute who was executed for the murders of some of her johns.	
1992	Something to Live for: The Alison Gertz Story	ABC	Peter	Peter Spears	Gay	Peter, who is dying of AIDS, is a friend of Alison Gertz.	
1992	Tru	PBS	Truman Capote	Robert Morse	Gay	Two days in the life of Capote in 1975 during the time of publication in Esquire magazine of chapters from his novel-in-progress Answered Prayers. (The controversial novel was published posthumously.)	
1993	And the Band Played On	HBO	Bill Kraus	Ian McKellen	Gay	Based on the 1987 non-fiction book And the Band Played On: Politics, People, and the AIDS Epidemic by Randy Shilts. Bill is a gay rights and AIDS activist and congressional aide. He also served as a liaison between the San Francisco gay community and its two successive US Representatives in the early 1980s. He was diagnosed with the disease in October 1984, and died in January 1986 in San Francisco. Kico is a San Francisco artist and Bill's lover. Gaëtan is a Canadian flight attendant. He was an early AIDS patient who was mistakenly identified as Patient Zero in a study on transmissibility. He claimed to have had over 2,500 sexual partners since becoming sexually active in 1972. He died in March 1984 as a result of kidney failure caused by AIDS-related infections. Eddie is Greek and San Francisco bathhouse owner. He threatened to sue if the government or anyone else tried to shut his bathhouse down. The Choreographer is an unnamed choreographer who is dying from the disease. Brandy is a flamboyant transvestite also dying from the disease.	
1993	And the Band Played On	HBO	Kico Govantes	B. D. Wong	Gay		
1993	And the Band Played On	HBO	Gaëtan Dugas	Jeffrey Nordling	Gay		
1993	And the Band Played On	HBO	Eddie Papasano	Phil Collins	Gay		
1993	And the Band Played On	HBO	The Choreographer	Richard Gere	Gay		
1993	And the Band Played On	HBO	Brandy Alexander	Stephen Spinella	Transvestite		
1993	Chantilly Lace	Showtime	Elizabeth	Ally Sheedy	Lesbian	Elizabeth is closeted and in love with Anne.	
1994	Roommates	NBC	Bill Thomas	Eric Stoltz	Gay	Bill has to share an apartment in a Seattle AIDS hospice with a homophobic roommate who contracted the disease through a blood transfusion.	
1994	X-Rated	CBC	Nathan Jones	Billy Merasty	Gay	Nathan is a Native North American ex-bicycle courier. He also appeared in the TV series that was renamed for the CBC drama series Liberty Street.	

=== 1995–1999 ===
Year	Title	Network	Character(s)	Actor(s)	Identity	Notes	Ref(s)
1995	A Mother's Prayer	USA	Deacon	RuPaul	Gay	Deacon is a counselor at the Gay Men's Health Crisis center. The film is the true story of Rosemary Holmstrom, who watched her husband die from complications of AIDS contracted through a blood transfusion and afterwards found out that she had also been infected with the virus. With time running out, she searched for an organization to help plan her young son's future and turned to the center for support.	
1995	The Price of Love	Fox	Bret	Peter Facinelli	Bisexual	16-year-old Bret is thrown out of his house. He runs away to Los Angeles, where he meets hustler Beau and becomes a gay-for-pay hustler. All Bret wants is a normal and stable life, so he turns himself over to Child Protective Services and becomes a ward of the state.	
1995	The Price of Love	Fox	Beau	Jay R. Ferguson	Gay	16-year-old Bret is thrown out of his house. He runs away to Los Angeles, where he meets hustler Beau and becomes a gay-for-pay hustler. All Bret wants is a normal and stable life, so he turns himself over to Child Protective Services and becomes a ward of the state.	
1995	Serving in Silence: The Margarethe Cammermeyer Story	NBC	Margarethe Cammermeyer	Glenn Close	Lesbian	Cammermeyer served in the United States Army for 26 years as a military nurse. When she admitted she was a lesbian during a security clearance interview, she was involuntary discharged. Margarethe then sued the Department of Defense in civil court. A U.S. District judge rescinded her removal, ruling that the military's policy on gays was unconstitutional and based only on prejudice. She was reinstated at her former rank, and served another 7 years before retiring. Diane is an artist and her life partner. Based on a true story.	
1995	Serving in Silence: The Margarethe Cammermeyer Story	NBC	Diane	Judy Davis	Lesbian		
1995	Victor/Victoria	NHK	Carroll "Toddy" Todd	Tony Roberts	Gay	Teddy is a cabaret performer. This is the videotaped version of the 1995 production of the Broadway musical of the same name, filmed exclusively for broadcast by NHK.	
1995	A Village Affair	ITV	Clodagh Unwin	Kerry Fox	Lesbian	Alice moves to the village of Pitcombe with her husband and their two daughters. There she meets Clodagh, and finds herself romantically and sexually attracted to her. The two have an affair. Based on the 1989 novel of the same name.	
1995	A Village Affair	ITV	Alice Jordan	Sophie Ward	Bisexual	Alice moves to the village of Pitcombe with her husband and their two daughters. There she meets Clodagh, and finds herself romantically and sexually attracted to her. The two have an affair. Based on the 1989 novel of the same name.	
1996	Bastard Out of Carolina	Showtime	Ruth Anne "Bone" Boatwright	Jena Malone	Lesbian	Ruth is physically and sexually abused on a regular basis by her stepfather. Aunt Raylene finds whip marks on Ruth's legs and has the other men in the family beat the stepfather unconscious for what he did to her. In the end, Ruth's mother abandons her and stays with her abusive husband, while Ruth goes to live with her Aunt Raylene. The film is a semi-autobiographical story based on the 1992 novel of the same name by Dorothy Allison.	
1996	Bastard Out of Carolina	Showtime	Aunt Raylene	Diana Scarwid	Lesbian	Ruth is physically and sexually abused on a regular basis by her stepfather. Aunt Raylene finds whip marks on Ruth's legs and has the other men in the family beat the stepfather unconscious for what he did to her. In the end, Ruth's mother abandons her and stays with her abusive husband, while Ruth goes to live with her Aunt Raylene. The film is a semi-autobiographical story based on the 1992 novel of the same name by Dorothy Allison.	
1996	Breaking the Code	BBC	Alan Turing	Derek Jacobi	Gay	Based on the true story of Turing, a homosexual at a time when it was illegal in Britain. He was a mathematician who helped crack the Enigma code used by the Germans to send secret orders to their U-boats in World War II. Considered the father of artificial intelligence, Turing was also one of the key contributors to the development of the digital computer.	
1996	Chasing the Dragon	Lifetime	Louis	Peter Frechette	Gay	The best friend of Gwen, who is addicted to heroin.	
1996	Losing Chase	Showtime	Chase Phillips	Helen Mirren	Lesbian	Chase is in an unhappy marriage. After a nervous breakdown, Elizabeth is hired to assist her. A friendship grows between them. Chase eventually confesses to Elizabeth that she is in love with her and kisses her, but Elizabeth cannot reciprocate the same feelings. Afterwards, Chase leaves her husband. The film was also released in theaters.	
1996	Two Mothers for Zachary	ABC |	Jody Ann Shaffell	Valerie Bertinelli	Lesbian	Once Jody Ann and Maggie become lovers, Jody Ann's homophobic parents file for custody of Jody Ann's son. It is a true story adaptation of the Bottoms v. Bottoms family custody battle. Bertinelli had previously learned of the Bottoms case years earlier when she appeared on the same edition of Larry King Live with Sharon Bottoms. Bottoms was appearing with her lawyer and argued her case against a Christian leader. Instead of concentrating on what she was intending to promote, Bertinelli became engaged in the previous debate and criticized the views of the religious representative.	
1996	Two Mothers for Zachary	ABC |	Maggie Fergus	Colleen Flynn	Lesbian		
1997	Any Mother's Son	Lifetime	Allen R. Schindler, Jr.	Paul Popowich	Gay	Based on the murder of Allen R. Schindler Jr. Schindler was in the Navy. He was stomped to death in a public restroom in Sasebo, Nagasaki, Japan. The medical examiner said his injuries were similar to what might be sustained in a high-speed car crash or a low-speed aircraft accident. Schindler's mother Dorothy Hajdys became a gay rights activist after his murder.	
1997	Breaking the Surface: The Greg Louganis Story	USA	Greg Louganis	Mario Lopez	Gay	Based on the true story of diver Louganis, who won two gold medals in the 1984 Summer Olympics. Tom was his lover, who hit him, cheated him out of money, and later died of AIDS. Adapted from the 1996 book Breaking the Surface.	
1997	Breaking the Surface: The Greg Louganis Story	USA	Tom Barrett	Jeffrey Meek	Gay	Based on the true story of diver Louganis, who won two gold medals in the 1984 Summer Olympics. Tom was his lover, who hit him, cheated him out of money, and later died of AIDS. Adapted from the 1996 book Breaking the Surface.	
1997	In the Gloaming	HBO	Danny	Robert Sean Leonard	Gay	Danny is dying of AIDS. He returns to his parents' home in the New York suburbs to spend his final days. His father finds it difficult to accept his son's sexuality, his sister avoids the issue, and his mother forges a deeper and more honest relationship with her dying son. Based on the short story by Alice Elliott Dark.	
1997	The Investigator	Channel 4	Sgt. Caroline Meagher	Helen Baxendale	Lesbian	True story of staff sergeant Meagher, who joined the Special Investigation Branch of the Royal Military Police and was charged with rooting out homosexual females in the ranks, but was herself coming to terms with her own lesbian orientation. Meagher was investigated and court-martialed. The real Caroline Meagher appears at the end of the film.	
1997	The Twilight of the Golds	Showtime	David Gold	Brendan Fraser	Gay	The film deals with the issue of fictional genetic testing, and asks the question: if testing could reveal the sexual orientation of your unborn child, and you knew he or she would be gay, would you abort? David, who has never been fully accepted by his conservative family, is the brother of Suzanne, who undergoes the testing, discovers her unborn son is destined to be gay, and considers abortion, much to the alarm of David. Based on the play of the same title.	
1998	Blind Faith	Showtime	Charles Williams Jr.	Garland Whitt	Gay	In 1957, Charles, a young black man, kills a young white man. The white man, one of seven white men, murdered his boyfriend David during a hate crime. Charles is arrested, charged, and put on trial, because he confessed. However, during the trial the circumstances of how it really happened are not revealed due to his homophobic father, a police officer who does not want his fellow white officers to find out his son is gay. In the end, Charlie sits on death row, awaiting the electric chair. Having lost appeal after appeal, he hangs himself to make his father proud.	
1998	Blind Faith	Showtime	David Mercer	Joel Gordon	Gay		
1998	Change Of Heart	Lifetime	Dr. Jim Marshall	John Terry	Gay	Jim leaves his wife for another man.	
1998	Final Justice	Lifetime	George Saticoy	Duffy Epstein	Gay	George is murdered by his business partner when he discovers him committing arson on the business they co-own. His sister kidnaps the lawyer who gets the murderer acquitted.	
1998	Gia	HBO	Gia Carangi	Angelina Jolie	Lesbian	Biopic about supermodel Carangi, who was a heroin addict . She died from an AIDS-related illness in 1986. The character of Linda, whom Gia was in love with, is an amalgam of a couple of different women.	
1998	Gia	HBO	Linda	Elizabeth Mitchell	Lesbian	Biopic about supermodel Carangi, who was a heroin addict . She died from an AIDS-related illness in 1986. The character of Linda, whom Gia was in love with, is an amalgam of a couple of different women.	
1998	Labor of Love	Lifetime	Mickey Wister	David Marshall Grant	Gay	Mickey is single and always wanted a child. His best friend Annie Pines is single and also always wanted a child. So, they figure, why not have a baby together?	
1998	Love Is the Devil: Study for a Portrait of Francis Bacon	BBC	Francis Bacon	Derek Jacobi	Gay	The movie is based on the real life of the British artist. Bacon had a relationship with George, a small-time thief. Craig's performance was well received by critics, acknowledging it as his breakthrough role.	
1998	Love Is the Devil: Study for a Portrait of Francis Bacon	BBC	George Dyer	Daniel Craig	Gay	The movie is based on the real life of the British artist. Bacon had a relationship with George, a small-time thief. Craig's performance was well received by critics, acknowledging it as his breakthrough role.	
1999	Execution of Justice	Showtime	Harvey Milk	Peter Coyote	Gay	The true story of the assassination of San Francisco City Supervisor Harvey Milk and Mayor George Moscone. Adaptation of the stage play of the same name.	

== 2000s ==
=== 2000–2004 ===
Year	Title	Network	Character(s)	Actor(s)	Identity	Notes	Ref(s)
2000	Common Ground	Showtime	Dorothy Nelson	Brittany Murphy	Lesbian	An anthology focusing on three generations of gays and lesbians in the fictional town of Homer, Connecticut, and their efforts to find "common ground" with the rest of the townsfolk. The film features three different stories written by gay and lesbian playwrights Paula Vogel, Terrence McNally and Harvey Fierstein: A Friend of Dorothy's: Set in the 1950s, Dorothy joins the Navy, where she meets a group of gay and lesbian sailors nicknamed the friends of Dorothy. She meets Billy, who takes her to a gay nightclub. The Naval Criminal Investigative Service raids the nightclub, Dorothy is busted, and she receives a blue discharge for sexual perversion. After returning to Homer, she tries to get a job as a school teacher, but is denied because of her Section 8 discharge. When she is outed to the town, her mother kicks her out and she becomes homeless. A woman at the local diner suggests to Dorothy that she go to Greenwich Village, a more tolerant place for gays and lesbians. Mr. Roberts: Set in the 1970s, Toby is a closeted gay high school student. Gil is a closeted gay high school teacher, and Gus is his live-in boyfriend. Toby visits a prostitute on the premise that she can help him become "a man", but she tells him to just be himself. After Toby is brutally beaten and raped by his homophobic classmates, Gil is the one who finds him. The teacher then decides to come out to his students and lectures them about bigotry and hatred. In the end, Toby graduates from high school and leaves Homer to attend college. Andy and Amos: Set in the year 2000, Andy and Amos are preparing for their wedding ceremony. Amos' father and the townsfolk are planning a march to protest against the wedding. Amos' father has to choose between prejudice and his love for his son. In the end, father and son reunite and the wedding takes place as scheduled.	
2000	Common Ground	Showtime	Billy	Jason Priestley	Gay		
2000	Common Ground	Showtime	Toby Anderson	Jonathan Taylor Thomas	Gay		
2000	Common Ground	Showtime	Gil Roberts	Steven Weber	Gay		
2000	Common Ground	Showtime	Gus	Scott McCord	Gay		
2000	Common Ground	Showtime	Andy	Andrew Airlie	Gay		
2000	Common Ground	Showtime	Amos	James LeGros	Gay		
2000	Holiday Heart	Showtime	Holiday Heart	Ving Rhames	Gay	Holiday is an African American drag queen at a nightclub in Chicago. After his boyfriend dies, he befriends a down-on-her-luck, drug-addicted single mother and her young daughter. He offers them a stable home and becomes a much-needed father figure for the daughter. Eventually the mother is run over and killed by a former boyfriend/drug dealer, and the daughter ends up living with Holiday.	
2000	If These Walls Could Talk 2	HBO	Edith Tree	Vanessa Redgrave	Lesbian	Three stories dealing with lesbian couples, in three different time periods, with all the stories set in the same house: 1961: Edith and Abby are an elderly couple living in the house. Abby suffers a stroke, and Edith asks to see her at the hospital, but is denied because she is not a family member. Abby dies alone during the night, and none of the hospital workers informed her afterwards. The house is in Abby's name, and Edith legally owns no part of it. Abby's nephew, her only living relative, decides to sell the house, and Edith has to move out. 1972: Linda is a young student who now shares the house with her three lesbian friends. Amy is a young butch lesbian who meets Linda in a bar. Linda's friends don't like Amy and question how they can be taken seriously as feminists if they associate with people like Amy. The two eventually sleep together and have a relationship. 2000: The house is now inhabited by Fran and Kal, a couple hoping to have a baby together. They plan to get a sperm donation from a gay couple, but the men are reluctant to agree to stay out of the baby's life, so Fran and Kal back out. They eventually settle on an anonymous donor, and after three attempts to get pregnant, they are successful when Fran is revealed to be pregnant.	
2000	If These Walls Could Talk 2	HBO	Abby Hedley	Marian Seldes	Lesbian		
2000	If These Walls Could Talk 2	HBO	Linda	Michelle Williams	Lesbian		
2000	If These Walls Could Talk 2	HBO	Amy	Chloë Sevigny	Lesbian		
2000	If These Walls Could Talk 2	HBO	Fran	Sharon Stone	Lesbian		
2000	If These Walls Could Talk 2	HBO	Kal	Ellen DeGeneres	Lesbian		
2000	The Truth About Jane	Lifetime	Jane	Ellen Muth	Lesbian	Jane is questioning her sexuality when the new girl Taylor arrives at her school. The two become friends and eventually kiss, and Jane finally realizes she is a lesbian. They end up having a sexual relationship, but later break up. Meanwhile, Jane's mother disapproves and wants Jane to get help, but in the end, after talking with Jane's guidance counselor and Jimmy, she reluctantly comes around and accepts her daughter's orientation. Lynn is the guidance counselor at school. She comes out to Jane to help her better understand her own identity. She talks with Jane's mother and helps her to understand and accept her daughter. Jimmy is a friend of the mother, who helps her accept her daughter for who she is.	
2000	The Truth About Jane	Lifetime	Taylor	Alicia Lagano	Lesbian		
2000	The Truth About Jane	Lifetime	Lynn Walcott	Kelly Rowan	Lesbian		
2000	The Truth About Jane	Lifetime	Jimmy	RuPaul	Gay		
2001	A Girl Thing	Showtime	Lauren Travis	Elle Macpherson	Lesbian	The film consists of four separate stories. In the first part, Lauren goes on a blind double date, rejects the man she is set up with, and instead falls for the other woman in the foursome, Casey. A romance blossoms between the pair, but Lauren has intimacy issues and is seeing a therapist. She is also scared of being identified as a lesbian, due to her homophobic best friend and law firm partner.	
2001	A Girl Thing	Showtime	Casey Montgomery	Kate Capshaw	Lesbian	The film consists of four separate stories. In the first part, Lauren goes on a blind double date, rejects the man she is set up with, and instead falls for the other woman in the foursome, Casey. A romance blossoms between the pair, but Lauren has intimacy issues and is seeing a therapist. She is also scared of being identified as a lesbian, due to her homophobic best friend and law firm partner.	
2001	A Glimpse of Hell	FX	Clay Hartwig	Dashiell Eaves	Gay	A fact-based story about how the U.S. Navy blamed a 1989 explosion aboard the U.S.S. Iowa on an alleged affair between sailors Hartwig and Truitt. The Navy's theory was that Clay sabotaged a gun turret to get revenge on Kendall, who allegedly had broken off a relationship. Forty-seven sailors were killed, either incinerated or blown to pieces. After the investigation was heavily criticized, the Navy re-opened the investigation and in 1991 announced that the Navy could not determine who or what had caused the tragedy. The Navy also apologized to Hartwig's family. The film is based on the book A Glimpse of Hell: The Explosion on the USS Iowa and Its Cover-Up.	
2001	A Glimpse of Hell	FX	Kendall Truitt	Jamie Harrold	Gay		
2001	Anatomy of a Hate Crime	MTV	Matthew Shepard	Cy Carter	Gay	Based on a true crime; the murder of openly gay college student Shepard, who was brutally beaten to death by two men he met in a bar. Both men received consecutive life sentences for the murder. The film was nominated for a GLAAD Media Award for Outstanding TV Movie or Limited Series.	
2001	What Makes a Family	Lifetime	Janine Neilssen	Brooke Shields	Lesbian	When Sandy dies, Janine must fight to keep the child Sandy bore through artificial insemination. The teleplay is based on the true story of Janine Ratcliffe, who in 1989 won custody of the daughter of her deceased partner, Joan Pearlman.	
2001	What Makes a Family	Lifetime	Sandy Cataldi	Cherry Jones	Lesbian	When Sandy dies, Janine must fight to keep the child Sandy bore through artificial insemination. The teleplay is based on the true story of Janine Ratcliffe, who in 1989 won custody of the daughter of her deceased partner, Joan Pearlman.	
2002	Bobbie's Girl	Showtime	Bailey Lewis	Bernadette Peters	Lesbian	Bailey and Roberta are a middle-aged couple who own and operate a bar in Ireland. When Roberta's brother and his wife are killed in a car accident their 10-year-old son, Roberta's nephew, comes to live with them.	
2002	Bobbie's Girl	Showtime	Roberta "Bobbie" Langham	Rachel Ward	Lesbian	Bailey and Roberta are a middle-aged couple who own and operate a bar in Ireland. When Roberta's brother and his wife are killed in a car accident their 10-year-old son, Roberta's nephew, comes to live with them.	
2002	The Laramie Project	HBO	Matthew Shepard	(No actor)	Gay	Cathy is the first instructor at the University of Wyoming who is 'out of the closet'.	
2002	The Laramie Project	HBO	Cathy Connolly	Janeane Garofalo	Lesbian	Cathy is the first instructor at the University of Wyoming who is 'out of the closet'.	
2002	The Matthew Shepard Story	Showtime	Matthew Shepard	Shane Meier	Gay	Based on the true story about the murder of openly gay college student Shepard who was brutally beaten to death by two men he met in a bar. Both men received consecutive life sentences for the murder.	
2002	No Night Is Too Long	BBC Two	Tim Cornish	Lee Williams	Bisexual	Tim is in his last year at college. Ivo is a paleontology lecturer at the same college. The two meet and begin a relationship. They travel to Alaska on a cruise. When the cruise stops at an island, Tim and Ivo get into an argument, and Tim slams Ivo against the mountainside. Believing he is dead, Tim flees to Vancouver, where he has a sexual relationship with Thierry. A year later, Thierry shows up at Tim's house and wants money. In the end, Ivo is not dead, but Thierry kills him believing he is Tim, because Ivo is wearing Tim's coat. Based on the 1994 novel of the same name	
2002	No Night Is Too Long	BBC Two	Ivo Steadman	Marc Warren	Gay		
2002	No Night Is Too Long	BBC Two	Thierry Massin	Salvatore Antonio	Gay		
2003	The Lion in Winter	Showtime	King Philip II	Jonathan Rhys Meyers	Bisexual	Philip and Richard were once lovers.	
2003	The Lion in Winter	Showtime	Richard the Lionheart	Andrew Howard	Bisexual	Philip and Richard were once lovers.	
2003	Murad	Indus TV	Saima	Sohail Asghar	? ? ?	Murad (a.k.a. Eunuch's Motherhood) is a part of the Maa Aur Mamta TV series of films based on Mothers.	
2003	Murad	Indus TV	Bobo	Qazi Wajid	? ? ?	Murad (a.k.a. Eunuch's Motherhood) is a part of the Maa Aur Mamta TV series of films based on Mothers.	
2003	Murad	Indus TV	Naddo	Nabeel Zafar	? ? ?	Murad (a.k.a. Eunuch's Motherhood) is a part of the Maa Aur Mamta TV series of films based on Mothers.	
2003	Normal	HBO	Roy/Ruth Applewood	Tom Wilkinson	Transgender	After a 25-year marriage to Irma, Roy reveals to his family that he is trans woman and is now Ruth. When Ruth decides to have a sex change operation, her co-workers are shocked. Ruth's church rejects her and her son struggles with the humiliation of having a father who now goes by the name Ruth.	
2003	Soldier's Girl	Showtime	Barry Winchell	Troy Garity	Gay	Based on the true story of the murder of Barry Winchell. Barry is a private in the Army, while Calpernia is a performer at a transgender revue in Nashville, Tennessee. Barry's roommate brings him to the club where Calpernia performs, and Barry and Calpernia start dating. Barry is harassed and called names for dating Calpernia. During a Fourth of July weekend, Barry easily beats a fellow soldier in a fight, who Barry has called out as being a fraud. The soldier beats Barry to death in his sleep with a baseball bat after becoming enraged when Barry's roommate harassed him about being beaten by "a fucking faggot". (The soldier, Calvin Glover, was convicted of murder and is serving a life sentence.)	
2003	Soldier's Girl	Showtime	Calpernia Addams	Lee Pace	Transgender		
2003	An Unexpected Love	Lifetime	Kate Mayer	Leslie Hope	Bisexual	Kate's tepid marriage has made both her and her husband unhappy for a long time, and she asks for a separation. After years as a housewife and mother, and with no work experience, she encounters difficulty in finding a job until Mac hires her as a receptionist in her real estate office. A friendship grows between them and Kate finds out that Mac is an out lesbian. As time passes, Kate develops an attraction to Mac, which is reciprocated, and they fall in love.	
2003	An Unexpected Love	Lifetime	McNally 'Mac' Hays	Wendy Crewson	Lesbian	Kate's tepid marriage has made both her and her husband unhappy for a long time, and she asks for a separation. After years as a housewife and mother, and with no work experience, she encounters difficulty in finding a job until Mac hires her as a receptionist in her real estate office. A friendship grows between them and Kate finds out that Mac is an out lesbian. As time passes, Kate develops an attraction to Mac, which is reciprocated, and they fall in love.	
2004	The Blackwater Lightship	CBS	Declan Breen	Keith McErlean	Gay	Declan is dying from AIDS.	
2004	Jack	Showtime	Paul	Ron Silver	Gay	Paul comes out to his family after getting a divorce, and informs them he is now living with his boyfriend Bob. The film is told from the point of view of his15-year-old son and how it affects his life. After finding out that his friends at school also have families that aren't perfect, he comes to accept his dad for who he is.	
2004	Jack	Showtime	Bob	Paul McGillion	Gay	Paul comes out to his family after getting a divorce, and informs them he is now living with his boyfriend Bob. The film is told from the point of view of his15-year-old son and how it affects his life. After finding out that his friends at school also have families that aren't perfect, he comes to accept his dad for who he is.	
2004	Prom Queen: The Marc Hall Story	CTV	Marc Hall	Aaron Ashmore	Gay	Based on a true story. Marc is a high school senior and attends St. Jude, a Catholic school. When the school asked students attending the prom to submit the names of the guests they intended to bring, he submitted the name of his boyfriend Jason. His request to attend prom with Jason was denied on the grounds that homosexuality is incompatible with Roman Catholic teaching. Marc then took the school board to court, where the court granted an interlocutory injunction ordering that he be allowed to attend the prom with Jason and also that the school not cancel the prom. Marc attended the prom with Jason.	
2004	Prom Queen: The Marc Hall Story	CTV	Jason	Mak Fyfe	Gay		

=== 2005–2009 ===
Year	Title	Network	Character(s)	Actor(s)	Identity	Notes	Ref(s)
2005	Deadly Skies	here!	Donovan	Antonio Sabato, Jr.	Gay	Donovan and Mark are a couple recruited to help with a plan to stop a giant asteroid on a collision course with the Earth. The film was released in the United States with gay content, while in other regions it was not.	
2005	Deadly Skies	here!	Mark	Michael Boisvert	Gay	Donovan and Mark are a couple recruited to help with a plan to stop a giant asteroid on a collision course with the Earth. The film was released in the United States with gay content, while in other regions it was not.	
2006	Trapped!	here!	Samantha	Alexandra Paul	Lesbian	Samantha and Dana are a couple. Samantha and her daughter are kidnapped in a plot to uncover a woman hidden in the Witness Protection Program. Samantha is an Internet security expert, so the kidnappers want her to use her skills to help reveal the location of the woman.	
2006	Trapped!	here!	Dana	Michelle Wolff	Lesbian	Samantha and Dana are a couple. Samantha and her daughter are kidnapped in a plot to uncover a woman hidden in the Witness Protection Program. Samantha is an Internet security expert, so the kidnappers want her to use her skills to help reveal the location of the woman.	
2006	Wedding Wars	A&E	Shel Grandy	John Stamos	Gay	Shel is a wedding planner and planning his straight brother's wedding. But when his brother's boss, the state governor, makes a speech against same-sex marriage, Shel goes on strike for equal rights. His strike eventually spreads nationwide. Ted is his partner.	
2006	Wedding Wars	A&E	Ted Moore	Sean Maher	Gay	Shel is a wedding planner and planning his straight brother's wedding. But when his brother's boss, the state governor, makes a speech against same-sex marriage, Shel goes on strike for equal rights. His strike eventually spreads nationwide. Ted is his partner.	
2006	Totally Awesome	VH1	Yamagashi	James Hong	Gay	Parody of a number of 1980s movies, including the Karate Kid films. Yamagashi is constantly naked in front of a boyishly handsome senior student at school, and coming on to him.	
2006	A Girl Like Me: The Gwen Araujo Story	Lifetime	Gwen Araujo	J. D. Pardo	Transgender	Based on the true story of the murder of Gwen Araujo. Gwen came out as transgender at fourteen. She was killed by four men, two of whom she had been sexually intimate with, who beat and strangled her after discovering that she was transgender.	
2006	Surrender, Dorothy	CBS	Shawn Best	Chris Pine	Gay		
2006	Times Have Been Better	France 2	Jeremy	Arnaud Binard	Gay	30-year-old Jeremy comes out as gay to his liberal parents, but they aren't as progressive as he thought they were.	
2007	Battlestar Galactica: Razor	Sci Fi Channel	Helena Cain	Michelle Forbes	Lesbian	Helena and Gina are a couple.	
2007	Battlestar Galactica: Razor	Sci Fi Channel	Gina Inviere	Tricia Helfer	Lesbian	Helena and Gina are a couple.	
2007	Clapham Junction	Channel 4	Robin	Rupert Graves	Gay	The movie is about the experiences of several men during a 36-hour period in the Clapham area of London and the consequences when their lives collide. Five stories are told from school and work, to bars and clubs, during one hot summer's night: Robin, a writer, has just finished a television script and is trying to sell it, but it's rejected by a television executive, who tells him the whole gay thing has been done. Later, Robin goes cruising in the public toilets, where he meets Julian. They try to hook up, but are interrupted. Robin leaves and Julian stays behind. Julian eventually finds a hook-up in the toilets and has sex with him. 14-year-old Theo has a crush on his 29-year-old neighbor Tim. Theo frequently spies on him through Tim's bedroom window and masturbates. Theo turns up one night at Tim's to return a pen he left behind at the library, and manages to talk his way into Tim's apartment. At first they awkwardly talk, but Theo eventually seduces a willingly Tim and they have sex. Will and Gavin are a couple getting ready for their civil commitment ceremony. Alfie is working as a waiter at the ceremony. Will, who has no intention of remaining faithful to Gavin, makes a move on Alfie as they snort cocaine in the pantry. Will tries to talk Alfie into having sex, but Alfie refuses. Alfie finds Will's ring in his pocket along with a note containing his phone number. Later, Alfie is killed in a gay-bashing incident in the park.	
2007	Clapham Junction	Channel 4	Julian	James Wilby	Gay		
2007	Clapham Junction	Channel 4	Theo	Luke Treadaway	Gay		
2007	Clapham Junction	Channel 4	Tim	Joseph Mawle	Gay		
2007	Clapham Junction	Channel 4	Will	Richard Lintern	Gay		
2007	Clapham Junction	Channel 4	Gavin	Stuart Bunce	Gay		
2007	Clapham Junction	Channel 4	Alfie	David Leon	Gay		
2007	Daphne	BBC	Daphne du Maurier	Geraldine Somerville	Bisexual	In a case of unrequited love, du Maurier attempts to pursue her friend Doubleday, and has a secret love affair with Lawrence. Based on the controversial chapters in Margaret Forster's 1993 authorized biography.	
2007	Daphne	BBC	Ellen Doubleday	Elizabeth McGovern	Bisexual	In a case of unrequited love, du Maurier attempts to pursue her friend Doubleday, and has a secret love affair with Lawrence. Based on the controversial chapters in Margaret Forster's 1993 authorized biography.	
2007	Daphne	BBC	Gertrude Lawrence	Janet McTeer	Bisexual	In a case of unrequited love, du Maurier attempts to pursue her friend Doubleday, and has a secret love affair with Lawrence. Based on the controversial chapters in Margaret Forster's 1993 authorized biography.	
2008	Ice Blues	here!	Donald Strachey	Chad Allen	Gay	Donald is a private investigator, and his husband Tim is a New York State Senate staffer. Tim asks Donald to uncover the source of an anonymous and generous donation of three million dollars in stolen money to a youth-counseling center that leads to a young man's death. Kenny is Strachey's assistant who's taking a course in private investigation. Adaptation of the novel Ice Blues by Richard Stevenson.	
2008	Ice Blues	here!	Timothy Callahan	Sebastian Spence	Gay	Donald is a private investigator, and his husband Tim is a New York State Senate staffer. Tim asks Donald to uncover the source of an anonymous and generous donation of three million dollars in stolen money to a youth-counseling center that leads to a young man's death. Kenny is Strachey's assistant who's taking a course in private investigation. Adaptation of the novel Ice Blues by Richard Stevenson.	
2008	Ice Blues	here!	Kenny Kwon	Nelson Wong	Gay	Donald is a private investigator, and his husband Tim is a New York State Senate staffer. Tim asks Donald to uncover the source of an anonymous and generous donation of three million dollars in stolen money to a youth-counseling center that leads to a young man's death. Kenny is Strachey's assistant who's taking a course in private investigation. Adaptation of the novel Ice Blues by Richard Stevenson.	
2008	Kiss Me Deadly	here!	Jacob Keane	Robert Gant	Gay	Jacob is a retired spy. He's now a photographer in Milan, Italy, and Paulo is his partner. When his former spy partner reappears after seventeen years with her memory erased and on the run from a pair of psychopathic assassins, he agrees to help her find out why. Kyra is the mother of Jacob's child.	
2008	Kiss Me Deadly	here!	Paulo	Nathan Whitaker	Gay	Jacob is a retired spy. He's now a photographer in Milan, Italy, and Paulo is his partner. When his former spy partner reappears after seventeen years with her memory erased and on the run from a pair of psychopathic assassins, he agrees to help her find out why. Kyra is the mother of Jacob's child.	
2008	Kiss Me Deadly	here!	Kyra	Katherine Kennard	Lesbian	Jacob is a retired spy. He's now a photographer in Milan, Italy, and Paulo is his partner. When his former spy partner reappears after seventeen years with her memory erased and on the run from a pair of psychopathic assassins, he agrees to help her find out why. Kyra is the mother of Jacob's child.	
2008	Knight Rider	NBC	Carrie Ruvai	Sydney Tamiia Poitier	Bisexual	Carrie Ruvai is an FBI Special Agent. Pilot for the revival of the Knight Rider franchise.	
2009	Prayers for Bobby	Lifetime	Bobby Griffith	Ryan Kelley	Gay	Based on the true story of the life and legacy of Bobby Griffith, a teen who killed himself in 1983 due to his mother's homophobia. After his mother, a devout Christian, constantly berates and criticizes her son for being gay, Bobby free-falls off a bridge on a highway into the path of an oncoming eighteen-wheeler truck, which kills him instantly. David was Bobby's boyfriend. Adapted from the book of the same name by Leroy F. Aarons.	
2009	Prayers for Bobby	Lifetime	David	Scott Bailey	Gay	Based on the true story of the life and legacy of Bobby Griffith, a teen who killed himself in 1983 due to his mother's homophobia. After his mother, a devout Christian, constantly berates and criticizes her son for being gay, Bobby free-falls off a bridge on a highway into the path of an oncoming eighteen-wheeler truck, which kills him instantly. David was Bobby's boyfriend. Adapted from the book of the same name by Leroy F. Aarons.	

== 2010s ==
=== 2010–2014 ===
Year	Title	Network	Character(s)	Actor(s)	Identity	Notes	Ref(s)
2010	The Counterfeiters (Les Faux-monnayeurs)	France 2	Olivier	Maxime Berger	Gay	Olivier is a young schoolboy who has sexual relations with his Uncle Edouard and lets himself be seduced by Comte de Passavant, a rich and trendy writer who is also cynical and manipulative. Based on the 1925 novel The Counterfeiters by André Gide.	
2010	The Counterfeiters (Les Faux-monnayeurs)	France 2	Uncle Edouard	Melvil Poupaud	Gay	Olivier is a young schoolboy who has sexual relations with his Uncle Edouard and lets himself be seduced by Comte de Passavant, a rich and trendy writer who is also cynical and manipulative. Based on the 1925 novel The Counterfeiters by André Gide.	
2010	The Counterfeiters (Les Faux-monnayeurs)	France 2	Comte de Passavant	Patrick Mille	Gay	Olivier is a young schoolboy who has sexual relations with his Uncle Edouard and lets himself be seduced by Comte de Passavant, a rich and trendy writer who is also cynical and manipulative. Based on the 1925 novel The Counterfeiters by André Gide.	
2010	The Secret Diaries of Miss Anne Lister	BBC Two; BBC HD	Anne Lister	Maxine Peake	Lesbian	Lister's first relationship is with Mariana, until she breaks it off to get married. Lister then meets Ann, another wealthy landowner, and settles down with her. Later, Mariana returns, saying she can leave her husband now, but Anne rejects her as she is already committed to Ann. Based on the deciphered diaries of Anne Lister, who kept diaries that chronicled the details of her everyday life, including her lesbian relationships. The diaries contain more than four million words, and those concerning the intimate details of her romantic and sexual relationships were written in a code. The diaries were deciphered in the 1930s.	
2010	The Secret Diaries of Miss Anne Lister	BBC Two; BBC HD	Mariana Belcombe	Anna Madeley	Bisexual		
2010	The Secret Diaries of Miss Anne Lister	BBC Two; BBC HD	Ann Walker	Christine Bottomley	Lesbian		
2010	Toast	BBC One	Nigel Slater	Freddie Highmore	Gay	Biographical film based on the life of the English cookery writer and journalist.	
2010	Worried About the Boy	BBC Two	Boy George	Douglas Booth	Gay	Biographical film based on the life of the English singer, who came out in 1995. Jon is his lover.	
2010	Worried About the Boy	BBC Two	Jon Moss	Mathew Horne	Gay	Biographical film based on the life of the English singer, who came out in 1995. Jon is his lover.	
2011	Christopher and His Kind	BBC Two	Christopher Isherwood	Matt Smith	Gay	The film is told in flash backs, and begins in 1931 as Isherwood prepares to leave England for Germany. Upon arrival, he takes up residence in a boarding house. Heinz is a street sweeper that Christopher meets and they fall in love. Auden is Christopher's friend who introduces him to a seedy gay club. Christopher meets Hamilton on the train on his way to Berlin and recommends the boarding house. Based on Isherwood's memoir of the same name.	
2011	Christopher and His Kind	BBC Two	Heinz Neddermayer	Douglas Booth	Gay	The film is told in flash backs, and begins in 1931 as Isherwood prepares to leave England for Germany. Upon arrival, he takes up residence in a boarding house. Heinz is a street sweeper that Christopher meets and they fall in love. Auden is Christopher's friend who introduces him to a seedy gay club. Christopher meets Hamilton on the train on his way to Berlin and recommends the boarding house. Based on Isherwood's memoir of the same name.	
2011	Christopher and His Kind	BBC Two	Wystan Auden	Pip Carter	Gay	The film is told in flash backs, and begins in 1931 as Isherwood prepares to leave England for Germany. Upon arrival, he takes up residence in a boarding house. Heinz is a street sweeper that Christopher meets and they fall in love. Auden is Christopher's friend who introduces him to a seedy gay club. Christopher meets Hamilton on the train on his way to Berlin and recommends the boarding house. Based on Isherwood's memoir of the same name.	
2011	Christopher and His Kind	BBC Two	Gerald Hamilton	Toby Jones	Gay	The film is told in flash backs, and begins in 1931 as Isherwood prepares to leave England for Germany. Upon arrival, he takes up residence in a boarding house. Heinz is a street sweeper that Christopher meets and they fall in love. Auden is Christopher's friend who introduces him to a seedy gay club. Christopher meets Hamilton on the train on his way to Berlin and recommends the boarding house. Based on Isherwood's memoir of the same name.	
2011	Cinema Verite	HBO	Lance Loud	Thomas Dekker	Gay	Based on the early reality television series An American Family. The film dramatizes the making of the series that originally aired on PBS. Lance was the oldest sibling of the family and was openly gay. He came out publicly during the series, making him the first person on American television to do so. He lived for a while in New York and resided at New York's Chelsea Hotel. He was a frequent visitor to gay bars and drag queen revues, and became best friends with Candy, a Warhol superstar and transgender icon; and Jackie, also a Warhol superstar, who performed as both a man and a woman throughout her career. Lance died of AIDS-related hepatitis in 2001.	
2011	Cinema Verite	HBO	Candy Darling	Willem Belli	Transgender		
2011	Cinema Verite	HBO	Jackie Curtis	Kyle Riabko	Transgender		
2011	À la recherche du temps perdu	France 2	Baron de Charlus	Didier Sandre	Gay	Based on the seven-volume novel In Search of Lost Time by Marcel Proust. The film is intertwined with stories involving homosexual and bisexual love stories. Baron de Charlus is a licentious man and a member of the influential Guermantes family. He has affairs with his tailor Jupien, who frequents male brothels, and Charles, a violinist and protege of Robert, who is bisexual.	
2011	À la recherche du temps perdu	France 2	Jupien	Michel Fau	Gay	Based on the seven-volume novel In Search of Lost Time by Marcel Proust. The film is intertwined with stories involving homosexual and bisexual love stories. Baron de Charlus is a licentious man and a member of the influential Guermantes family. He has affairs with his tailor Jupien, who frequents male brothels, and Charles, a violinist and protege of Robert, who is bisexual.	
2011	À la recherche du temps perdu	France 2	Charles Morel	Vincent Heden	Gay	Based on the seven-volume novel In Search of Lost Time by Marcel Proust. The film is intertwined with stories involving homosexual and bisexual love stories. Baron de Charlus is a licentious man and a member of the influential Guermantes family. He has affairs with his tailor Jupien, who frequents male brothels, and Charles, a violinist and protege of Robert, who is bisexual.	
2011	À la recherche du temps perdu	France 2	Robert de Saint-Loup	Andy Gillet	Bisexual	Based on the seven-volume novel In Search of Lost Time by Marcel Proust. The film is intertwined with stories involving homosexual and bisexual love stories. Baron de Charlus is a licentious man and a member of the influential Guermantes family. He has affairs with his tailor Jupien, who frequents male brothels, and Charles, a violinist and protege of Robert, who is bisexual.	
2011	The Night Watch	BBC Two	Helen	Claire Foy	Lesbian	The film is based on the novel of the same name by Sarah Waters. Helen and Kay are girlfriends. Helen then left her for Julia, an accomplished author.	
2011	The Night Watch	BBC Two	Kay	Anna Maxwell Martin	Lesbian	The film is based on the novel of the same name by Sarah Waters. Helen and Kay are girlfriends. Helen then left her for Julia, an accomplished author.	
2011	The Night Watch	BBC Two	Julia	Anna Wilson-Jones	Lesbian	The film is based on the novel of the same name by Sarah Waters. Helen and Kay are girlfriends. Helen then left her for Julia, an accomplished author.	
2011	Steven Niles' Remains	Chiller	Jensen	Miko Hughes	Gay	The film takes place in the aftermath of a devastating zombie apocalypse, where a group of survivors have banded together in the ruins of a casino in Reno, Nevada. Jensen is a magician's assistant who moved to Reno to live with his boyfriend. Adaptation of the comic series of the same name.	
2013	Behind the Candelabra	HBO	Liberace	Michael Douglas	Gay	Biographical film that tells the story of the last ten years in the life of pianist Liberace and his relationship with his live-in lover, Thorson. Scott moved in with Liberace when he was 18, and had plastic surgery at Liberace's insistence, so he would look more like him. When Scott finally left Liberace, he sued him for palimony. Liberace died in February 1987 from AIDS. The film is based on the memoir Behind the Candelabra: My Life with Liberace by Thorson.	
2013	Behind the Candelabra	HBO	Scott Thorson	Matt Damon	Gay	Biographical film that tells the story of the last ten years in the life of pianist Liberace and his relationship with his live-in lover, Thorson. Scott moved in with Liberace when he was 18, and had plastic surgery at Liberace's insistence, so he would look more like him. When Scott finally left Liberace, he sued him for palimony. Liberace died in February 1987 from AIDS. The film is based on the memoir Behind the Candelabra: My Life with Liberace by Thorson.	
2014	Jongens	NPO Zapp	Marc	Ko Zandvliet	Gay	Along with his best friend (Stef), Sieger is a member of the local athletics team. They—and two other boys, Tom and Marc—are chosen to represent the team at the national championship relay race.	
2014	Jongens	NPO Zapp	Sieger	Gijs Blom	Gay	Along with his best friend (Stef), Sieger is a member of the local athletics team. They—and two other boys, Tom and Marc—are chosen to represent the team at the national championship relay race.	
2014	The Normal Heart	HBO	Ned Weeks	Mark Ruffalo	Gay	Teleplay by Larry Kramer, based on his play of the same name. The film depicts the rise of the HIV-AIDS crisis in New York City between 1981 and 1984. Ned is a writer from New York City, and the founder of a prominent HIV advocacy group. Felix is a New York Times reporter who Ned contacts hoping that he can use his media connections to publish more stories about the health crisis. The two begin a romantic relationship. Felix eventually comes down with symptoms and dies. Craig and Bruce are dating. At his birthday party, Craig becomes ill, collapses, and begins to cough repeatedly. Later, Craig suddenly suffers violent convulsions and is rushed to the hospital where he is later pronounced dead. Later, Bruce begins dating Albert. When Albert contracts the disease, they travel to Phoenix so that Albert can see his mother one more time. When they get to Phoenix, Albert dies, but the hospital refuses to examine him and throws him out with the garbage. Bruce bribes a funeral home to cremate his body without a death certificate. In the end, Bruce dies as well.	
2014	The Normal Heart	HBO	Felix Turner	Matt Bomer	Gay		
2014	The Normal Heart	HBO	Craig Donner	Jonathan Groff	Gay		
2014	The Normal Heart	HBO	Bruce Niles	Taylor Kitsch	Gay		
2014	The Normal Heart	HBO	Albert	Finn Wittrock	Gay		
2014	The Normal Heart	HBO	Dr. Emma Brookner	Julia Roberts	Lesbian		

=== 2015–2019 ===
Year	Title	Network	Character(s)	Actor(s)	Identity	Notes	Ref(s)
2015	Bessie	HBO	Bessie Smith	Queen Latifah	Bisexual	Biopic about the popular Jazz Age singer known as the "Empress of the Blues." Rainey is the first woman with whom Smith has a sexual relationship.	
2015	Bessie	HBO	Ma Rainey	Mo'Nique	Bisexual	Biopic about the popular Jazz Age singer known as the "Empress of the Blues." Rainey is the first woman with whom Smith has a sexual relationship.	
2016	Sister Cities	Lifetime	Austin Baxter	Jess Weixler	Lesbian	Austin is a writer who moved back home to take care of her mother. Her girlfriend is Sarah.	
2016	Sister Cities	Lifetime	Sarah	Aimee Garcia	Lesbian	Austin is a writer who moved back home to take care of her mother. Her girlfriend is Sarah.	
2016	Mother, May I Sleep With Danger?	Lifetime	Leah	Leila George	Lesbian	Leah is in love with Pearl, a vampire. The film is a re-imagining of the similarly titled 1996 television movie.	
2016	Mother, May I Sleep With Danger?	Lifetime	Pearl	Emily Meade	Lesbian	Leah is in love with Pearl, a vampire. The film is a re-imagining of the similarly titled 1996 television movie.	
2018	Agatha and the Truth of Murder	Channel 5	Mabel Rogers	Pippa Haywood	Lesbian	Mabel convinces Agatha Christie to help her find out who killed her long-term partner, Florence Nightingale Shore. The film is an alternative history story about the real-life disappearance of Christie in 1926, and includes the real crime against Shore which remains unsolved.	
2018	I Am Jonas	Arte	Jonas	Félix Maritaud	Gay	The film switches between present and past. In present day, Jonas is a troubled man. In the past, a teenaged Jonas meets Nathan, and they have a relationship. One night they go to a gay bar, but are refused entry as the minimum age is 18 years. A man notices and tells them to get in his car and he will take them to a gay bar where there is no age limit. They get in his car, but soon Nathan gets suspicious as the ride takes too long. The driver punches Nathan and knocks him out, while Jonas is able to escape. Back in the present, Jonas runs into Nathan's family and admits that he lied on the evening Nathan got kidnapped. He didn't actually escape, but the kidnapper forced him to leave the car. Since then he's struggled with the guilt that he should have stayed in the car.	
2018	I Am Jonas	Arte	Nathan	Tommy-Lee Baïk	Gay		
2018	Riot	ABC	Lance Gowland	Damon Herriman	Gay	Dramatization, based on true stories, of the gay rights movement in Australia in the 1970s and the 1978 street protest that gave birth to the Sydney Gay and Lesbian Mardi Gras.	
2018	Riot	ABC	Ron Austin	Josh Quong Tart	Gay	Dramatization, based on true stories, of the gay rights movement in Australia in the 1970s and the 1978 street protest that gave birth to the Sydney Gay and Lesbian Mardi Gras.	
2018	Riot	ABC	Peter De Waal	Luke Mullins	Gay	Dramatization, based on true stories, of the gay rights movement in Australia in the 1970s and the 1978 street protest that gave birth to the Sydney Gay and Lesbian Mardi Gras.	
2018	Riot	ABC	Peter "Bon" Bonsall-Boone	Eden Falk	Gay	Dramatization, based on true stories, of the gay rights movement in Australia in the 1970s and the 1978 street protest that gave birth to the Sydney Gay and Lesbian Mardi Gras.	
2018	Riot	ABC	Jim Walker	Xavier Samuel	Gay	Dramatization, based on true stories, of the gay rights movement in Australia in the 1970s and the 1978 street protest that gave birth to the Sydney Gay and Lesbian Mardi Gras.	
2018	Riot	ABC	Sue Willis	Fern Sutherland	Lesbian	Dramatization, based on true stories, of the gay rights movement in Australia in the 1970s and the 1978 street protest that gave birth to the Sydney Gay and Lesbian Mardi Gras.	
2018	Riot	ABC	Gabrielle Antolovich	Hanna Mangan-Lawrence	Lesbian	Dramatization, based on true stories, of the gay rights movement in Australia in the 1970s and the 1978 street protest that gave birth to the Sydney Gay and Lesbian Mardi Gras.	
2018	Riot	ABC	Marg McMann	Kate Box	Lesbian	Dramatization, based on true stories, of the gay rights movement in Australia in the 1970s and the 1978 street protest that gave birth to the Sydney Gay and Lesbian Mardi Gras.	
2018	Riot	ABC	Robyn Plaister	Jessica De Gouw	Lesbian	Dramatization, based on true stories, of the gay rights movement in Australia in the 1970s and the 1978 street protest that gave birth to the Sydney Gay and Lesbian Mardi Gras.	
2019	Bad Education	HBO	Frank Tassone	Hugh Jackman	Gay	Frank has an affair with his former student Kyle.	
2019	Bad Education	HBO	Kyle Contreras	Rafael Casal	Gay	Frank has an affair with his former student Kyle.	
2019	Deadwood: The Movie	HBO	Calamity Jane	Robin Weigert	Lesbian	Calamity is in love with Joanie. Joanie is a hostess at a brothel. They rekindle their romance that first began in Deadwood, the television series the movie is based on.	
2019	Deadwood: The Movie	HBO	Joanie Stubbs	Kim Dickens	Lesbian	Calamity is in love with Joanie. Joanie is a hostess at a brothel. They rekindle their romance that first began in Deadwood, the television series the movie is based on.	
2019	One Red Nose Day and a Wedding	BBC One; BBC Two	Miranda	Lily James	Lesbian	Miranda and Faith marry in this "25 years later" short film sequel to 1994's Four Weddings and a Funeral, produced for the 2019 Comic Relief telethon.	
2019	One Red Nose Day and a Wedding	BBC One; BBC Two	Faith	Alicia Vikander	Lesbian	Miranda and Faith marry in this "25 years later" short film sequel to 1994's Four Weddings and a Funeral, produced for the 2019 Comic Relief telethon.	
2019	Trapped: The Alex Cooper Story	Lifetime	Alex Cooper	Addison Holley	Lesbian	Alex is 15, and raised by conservative Mormon parents. She meets Frankie, an 18-year-old who's out, and they begin a relationship. When Alex comes out to her parents, they trick Alex and leave her in the custody of a Mormon couple in Utah to undergo gay conversion therapy. She spends eight months under their cruel authority before she is finally able to escape and find help. Jason is a classmate of Alex in a Utah high school. Together with a sympathetic teacher in charge of the local gay–straight alliance, he helps Alex find an attorney to extricate her. The film is based on the 2016 memoir, Saving Alex: When I Was Fifteen I Told My Mormon Parents I Was Gay, and That's When My Nightmare Began.	
2019	Trapped: The Alex Cooper Story	Lifetime	Frankie	Nicolette Pearse	Lesbian		
2019	Trapped: The Alex Cooper Story	Lifetime	Jason	Stephen Joffe	Gay		

== 2020s ==
=== 2020–2024 ===
Year	Title	Network	Character(s)	Actor(s)	Identity	Notes	Ref(s)
2020	The Christmas House	Hallmark Channel	Brandon	Jonathan Bennett	Gay	Brandon is a baker and married to Jake. Brandon returns to his parents' home at Christmas for a family tradition. The entire home, inside and out, will be extensively decorated for Christmas. The film was the first Hallmark movie to prominently feature a same-sex couple.	
2020	The Christmas House	Hallmark Channel	Jake	Brad Harder	Gay	Brandon is a baker and married to Jake. Brandon returns to his parents' home at Christmas for a family tradition. The entire home, inside and out, will be extensively decorated for Christmas. The film was the first Hallmark movie to prominently feature a same-sex couple.	
2020	The Christmas Setup	Lifetime	Hugo	Ben Lewis	Gay	Hugo is a New York City attorney who comes home to visit his mother for Christmas. He reconnects with his high school crush Patrick, and they fall in love. Hugo has been offered a promotion to his firm's office in London, so they must decide between Patrick moving, or Hugo staying.	
2020	The Christmas Setup	Lifetime	Patrick	Blake Lee	Gay	Hugo is a New York City attorney who comes home to visit his mother for Christmas. He reconnects with his high school crush Patrick, and they fall in love. Hugo has been offered a promotion to his firm's office in London, so they must decide between Patrick moving, or Hugo staying.	
2020	Dashing in December	Paramount Network	Wyatt Burwall	Peter Porte	Gay	Wyatt returns home for the holidays in an effort to convince his mother to sell the family's Colorado ranch. After arriving, he meets ranch hand Heath, who doesn't want the ranch sold, and the two begin a romantic relationship.	
2020	Dashing in December	Paramount Network	Heath Ramos	Juan Pablo Di Pace	Gay	Wyatt returns home for the holidays in an effort to convince his mother to sell the family's Colorado ranch. After arriving, he meets ranch hand Heath, who doesn't want the ranch sold, and the two begin a romantic relationship.	
2020	Love Under the Olive Tree	Hallmark Channel	Adam Caulfield	Shawn Roberts	Gay	Adam is a farm worker and Billy owns the local bar. They have a subtle romantic relationship that begins with a date to a barn dance and eventually a dinner for two. |rowspan="2"|	
2020	Love Under the Olive Tree	Hallmark Channel	Billy Stevens	Andrew Dunbar	Gay	Adam is a farm worker and Billy owns the local bar. They have a subtle romantic relationship that begins with a date to a barn dance and eventually a dinner for two. |rowspan="2"|	
2020	The Thing About Harry	Freeform	Sam Baselli	Jake Borelli	Gay	Sam is a young man who's forced to share a car ride with Harry, a popular jock who was his enemy in high school. Harry comes out as pansexual during the ride. They sporadically meet throughout the following years, and spend the night together while attending a wedding. They eventually get married and are raising a child together.	
2020	The Thing About Harry	Freeform	Harry Turpin	Niko Terho	Pansexual	Sam is a young man who's forced to share a car ride with Harry, a popular jock who was his enemy in high school. Harry comes out as pansexual during the ride. They sporadically meet throughout the following years, and spend the night together while attending a wedding. They eventually get married and are raising a child together.	
2021	A Loud House Christmas	Nickelodeon	Howard McBride	Justin Michael Stevenson	Gay	Howard and Harold are Clyde's dads. Luna and Sam are dating. Based on the characters from the animated show.	
2021	A Loud House Christmas	Nickelodeon	Harold McBride	Marcus Folmar	Gay	Howard and Harold are Clyde's dads. Luna and Sam are dating. Based on the characters from the animated show.	
2021	A Loud House Christmas	Nickelodeon	Luna Loud	Sophia Woodward	Lesbian	Howard and Harold are Clyde's dads. Luna and Sam are dating. Based on the characters from the animated show.	
2021	A Loud House Christmas	Nickelodeon	Sam Sharp	Zoë DuVall	Lesbian	Howard and Harold are Clyde's dads. Luna and Sam are dating. Based on the characters from the animated show.	
2021	Under the Christmas Tree	Lifetime	Alma Beltran	Elise Bauman	Lesbian	Charlie is searching for the perfect Christmas tree for the governor of Maine. She finds it on Alma's property. Alma becomes flustered when she first meets Charlie. They fall in love.	
2021	Under the Christmas Tree	Lifetime	Charlie Freemont	Tattiawna Jones	Lesbian	Charlie is searching for the perfect Christmas tree for the governor of Maine. She finds it on Alma's property. Alma becomes flustered when she first meets Charlie. They fall in love.	
2021	An Unexpected Christmas	Hallmark Channel	Becca	Alison Wandzura	Lesbian	Becca is a single mother and the sister of Jamie.	
2022	The Holiday Sitter	Hallmark Channel	Jason	George Krissa	Gay	Sam is babysitting his sister's kids when he meets her neighbour Jason. They begin a relationship.	
2022	The Holiday Sitter	Hallmark Channel	Sam	Jonathan Bennett	Gay	Sam is babysitting his sister's kids when he meets her neighbour Jason. They begin a relationship.	
2022	Love, Classified	Hallmark Channel	Francesca "Franki" Murray	Arienne Mandi	Lesbian	Franki is a cardiologist who hasn't gone on a date in a long time. She posts a message under an anonymous name on the dating section of "Classify", an app for local classifieds, and takes a chance on a blind date with an anonymous person that seems to be compatible with her. Taylor owns a plant and flower shop, and is the daughter of a famous author. She has never engaged in online dating before, but on impulse responds to an anonymous post she likes and accepts to meet the person on a coffee date. She is surprised to discover that the person is a woman, and she has never before met a woman who interested her. Franki and Taylor like their mutual rapport, are attracted to each other, and begin dating.	
2022	Love, Classified	Hallmark Channel	Taylor Bloom	Katherine McNamara	Bisexual		
2023	Friends & Family Christmas	Hallmark Channel	Daniella McCallan	Humberly González	Lesbian	Singles Daniella and Amelia are set up on a blind date by their parents, and they fall in love.	
2023	Friends & Family Christmas	Hallmark Channel	Amelia Kasmerec	Ali Liebert	Lesbian	Singles Daniella and Amelia are set up on a blind date by their parents, and they fall in love.	
2023	The Naughty Nine	Disney Channel	Jon Anthony Dizon	Deric McCabe	Gay	Jon is a flamboyant boy.	
2023	You're Not Supposed to Be Here	Lifetime Movie Network	Zoe	Chrishell Stause	Lesbian	Before their baby is born, couple Zoe and Kennedy decide to spend a weekend getaway at a cabin in a remote mountain town, but the locals are not welcoming and begin to pose a threat to them and their baby.	
2023	You're Not Supposed to Be Here	Lifetime Movie Network	Kennedy	Diora Baird	Lesbian	Before their baby is born, couple Zoe and Kennedy decide to spend a weekend getaway at a cabin in a remote mountain town, but the locals are not welcoming and begin to pose a threat to them and their baby.	

=== 2025–2029 ===
Year	Title	Network	Character(s)	Actor(s)	Identity	Notes	Ref(s)
2025	Can You Feel the Beat: The Lisa Lisa Story	Lifetime Movie Network	Toni Ménage	Bre-Z	Lesbian	Toni joins Lisa's band as a backup singer, and the two become best friends. When their friendship becomes influential, her lesbian identity is used against her by Barry, record label producer, and Toni is fired behind Lisa's back.	
2025	The Christmas Baby	Hallmark Channel	Erin	Ali Liebert	Lesbian	Married couple Erin and Kelly find an abandoned baby boy in Erin"s shop..	
2025	The Christmas Baby	Hallmark Channel	Kelly	Katherine Barrell	Lesbian	Married couple Erin and Kelly find an abandoned baby boy in Erin"s shop..	

== See also ==
- List of bisexual characters in television
- List of gay characters in television
- List of lesbian characters in television
- List of transgender characters in television
- List of fictional asexual characters
- List of fictional intersex characters
- List of fictional non-binary characters
- List of fictional pansexual characters
- List of animated series with LGBT characters
