= Roe v. Roe =

Landmark 1985 child custody case in Virginia

Roe v. Roe was a landmark child custody case in Virginia that denied the father custody due to his sexual orientation. The 1985 case was brought to the Virginia Supreme Court and the father's custody was removed due to “continuous exposure of his nine-year-old daughter to his immoral and illicit homosexual relationship" which they claimed "rendered him an unfit and improper custodian.” Because homosexuality violated the Virginia sodomy laws, and was considered a class 6 felony, custody was granted to the mother.

== Background ==
The trial case used fictitious surnames for both parties.

Catherine Roe (biological mother) and David Roe (biological father) were married in 1971. Their daughter was born in 1974. The couple separated in 1975. Catherine Roe served as the primary caregiver until December 1978 when she was diagnosed with cancer. David Roe became a more active caregiver at that time, and subsequently petitioned for custody in the fall of 1979. From then until 1983, the child stayed within the custody of David Roe and the child's mother was unable to care for her.

== Verdict ==
In 1983 the mother filed a temporary restraining order claiming David Roe was living with a man. She reported that she saw the two men "hugging and kissing and sleeping in bed together." The mother's petition for custody was also based on the fact that she was now recovered and in remission and thus able to care for her daughter. Initially, the trial court found that each parent should get joint custody. The court did condition this arrangement on the fact that the father was required to not share the same bed with his lover. The court cited the ruling on Brown v. Brown (which removed custody from the mother of two young children due to her living with another man while in the process of trying to divorce her husband/the father of the children).

Following this ruling, the Supreme Court of Virginia ceased joint custody and all visitation rights and the mother was granted sole custody.

== Precedent ==
The case was used as the precedent for the Bottoms v. Bottoms case in which a lesbian mother was denied custody of her son due to her sexuality. Specifically, the case has been used to prevent homosexual people from having custody of their natural children.
