= Lund v. Commonwealth =

Lund v. Commonwealth (Va. 1977) 232 S.E.2d 745 is a Supreme Court of Virginia case involving theft of services.

== Facts ==
Charles Walter Lund was a statistics graduate student at the Virginia Polytechnic Institute and State University. While working on his Ph.D. research in the 1970s, Lund utilized the resources of Virginia Tech's computer lab.

The workings of the lab were complex. The computers were leased from IBM computers and the cost was distributed through various departments that used the computer facilities. Student who wished to use the computers were required to obtain the approval of the department head. Access keys were required to gain access to the lab, and a key was required to use PO boxes used to receive materials printed out on the computers. The student would ask for an item to be printed. The department would print the item and it would be placed in the PO box for retrieval. If the printed projects were too large to fit in the PO box a note would be placed there instead so the student could pick it up at the computer center main window.

Lund was put under surveillance on October 12, 1974, because departments were noticing unauthorized charges being made to their accounts. When asked about his activities on the computers, Lund initially denied any use of the computers. Later he admitted that he had been using it and turned over seven PO box keys to the investigator. Mr. Lund claimed that other students had given him those keys. Upon searching Lund's apartment, a large number of computer cards and print-outs were taken, the estimated value by the university being as much as $26,384.16.

Lund was charged in an indictment with the theft of keys, computer cards, computer printouts and using "without authority computer operation time and services of Computer Center Personnel... with intent to defraud, such property and services having a value of one hundred dollars or more." Lund waived his right to a jury trial and was convicted of grand larceny and sentenced to two years in the state penitentiary. His sentence was suspended and he was placed on probation for five years.

== Holding ==
The Supreme Court of Virginia held that labor and services and the unauthorized use of the University's computer cannot be construed to be subject of larceny. The Court reasoned that labor or services cannot be the subject of the crime of larceny because neither time nor services may be taken or carried away, and that the unauthorized use of the computer could not be the subject of larceny, because "Nowhere in Code §§ 18.1-100[…] do we find the word 'use'."

On the subject of the "stolen" items, the Commonwealth argued that the printouts and the computer cards had as much market value as scrap paper: "The cost of producing the print-outs is not the proper criterion of value for the purpose here. Where there is no market value of an article that has been stolen, the better rule is that its actual value should be proved..."

The judgment and indictment of the trial court was reversed based on lack of evidence to convict the defendant of grand larceny under Code §18.1-100 or § 18.1-118.
