= Truth or Consequences, N.M. (film) =

- Theatrical release poster
- Directed by: Kiefer Sutherland
- Written by: Brad Mirman
- Produced by: J. Paul Higgins; Kevin Messick; Hilary Wayne
- Starring: Vincent Gallo; Kiefer Sutherland; Mykelti Williamson; Kevin Pollak; Kim Dickens; Grace Phillips; Rod Steiger; Martin Sheen
- Cinematography: Ric Waite
- Edited by: Lawrence Jordan
- Music by: Jude Cole
- Production companies: Ink Slinger Productions; Triumph Films
- Distributed by: Sony Pictures Releasing
- Release date: May 2, 1997 (United States)
- Running time: 107 minutes
- Country: United States
- Language: English
- Box office: $122,046

Truth or Consequences, N.M. is a 1997 American neo-noir film directed by Kiefer Sutherland starring Sutherland, Vincent Gallo, Mykelti Williamson, Kevin Pollak, Max Perlich, Rod Steiger, and Kim Dickens, among others.

== Plot ==
Raymond Lembecke is an ex-con just out of prison after serving time for selling drugs for his boss Eddie Grillo. Lembecke was innocent, but took the fall for Grillo. Lembecke thinks Grillo owes him, so when his former boss gets him a measly job in a warehouse, he decides on revenge and plans to steal a million dollars' worth of drugs from him.

Lembecke plans the heist with Marcus Weans, who unbeknownst to them is an undercover DEA agent, and the disturbed trigger-happy Curtis Freley. Lembecke's girlfriend, Addy Monroe, also comes along. Curtis kills an undercover DEA agent (who's wearing a wire) during the heist. They decide to skip town and head to Las Vegas to sell the stolen goods; later they hope to make it to Mexico.

As they head out of the city, they kidnap a couple who own a recreational vehicle. But soon, hostage Gordon Jacobson falls under the spell of the Stockholm syndrome and begins to emulate his kidnappers and wants to stay involved in their hunt. In addition to fleeing the police, the group must also now avoid an assassin named Sir, who has been dispatched by the mafia, because Eddie Grillo was merely working for the real mob boss in Las Vegas, Tony Vago, whom they have just attempted to sell the drugs to. In effect, they were selling Vago's own drugs back to him.

They visit Wayne, a former jailmate of Lambecke, to try to make another connection to sell the drugs in New Mexico. This leads them to the empty home of Lembecke's brother in Truth or Consequences, NM, to make the deal, where all forces convene against them.

== Cast ==
- Vincent Gallo as Raymond Lembecke
- Mykelti Williamson as Marcus Weans
- Kiefer Sutherland as Curtis Freley
- Kevin Pollak as Gordon Jacobson
- Kim Dickens as Addy Monroe
- Grace Phillips as Donna Moreland
- James McDaniel as Frank Thompson
- Rick Rossovich as Robert Boylan
- John C. McGinley as Eddie Grillo
- Max Perlich as Wayne
- Rod Steiger as Tony Vago
- Martin Sheen as Sir

== Background and production ==
Truth or Consequences, N.M. was produced by Triumph Films, an indie division of Sony, which they shut down the same year the film was released. Filming did not take place in the actual city of Truth or Consequences, New Mexico; instead, Heber, Hurricane, Park City, Rockville, Salt Lake City, and Washington, all in Utah; and Las Vegas and Mesquite, both in Nevada, were all used as locations.

At the time, the film was touted as being Vincent Gallo's first role as a romantic lead. Kiefer Sutherland told The Los Angeles Times in 1997 that "the lead characters are losers", adding that "if they'd turned left, they might have actually contributed to society. I've done it many times myself — if I'd just turned left, instead of right. I don't get through a morning without going, 'God, I wish I hadn't done that', or 'I wish I'd done this better'." In another 1997 interview with Women's Wear Daily, Sutherland said he was embarrassed by a scene where his character is dancing to music at his gang's suburban hideout. He said, "when we were working on the sound, every time we’d show that scene to a different group of people, it was so hard for me. But it worked for the film." In this scene, there is a framed poster of an image from Eric Drooker's graphic novel Flood! (1992), which was also used as the artwork for Faith No More's 1995 album King for a Day... Fool for a Lifetime.

According to critic Paul Fischer, the film had ratings problems due to violent scenes involving Martin Sheen.

== Music ==
The film featured licensed rock and country songs from artists including The Allman Brothers Band, Lucinda Williams, Pete Droge, Tracy Bonham, Van Morrison and Vibrolush.

== Release ==
The producers used the following tagline when marketing the film:

When you're running on fear, don't stop for gas.

On May 2, 1997, the film opened in a very limited release, appearing in seven theaters at its widest. Box office sales for its opening week totaled $19,528. Total sales for the film's theatrical run were $109,261. The film was later released on video in November 1997.

On April 9, 2013, Truth or Consequences, N.M. was released to Blu-ray by Mill Creek Entertainment as part of a double feature set with The Replacement Killers. It was released as part of a Blu-ray bundle on February 16, 2015, alongside Color of Night, Playing God, and The Replacement Killers.

== Critical reception ==
On the review aggregator website Rotten Tomatoes, 38% of 16 critics' reviews are positive.

Siskel and Ebert gave the film two thumbs down on a 1997 episode of their program. They described it as being highly derivative of director Quentin Tarantino, with Siskel saying it was "a little bit better than most Tarantino imitations, but not [by] very much." Lisa Schwarzbaum of Entertainment Weekly gave the film a negative review in 1997, criticizing its "pointless violence", the "moronic" love affair between Raymond and Addy and the "derivative, hackneyed script." In his review for The New York Times, Stephen Holden also criticized the romantic plot between Raymond and Addy, saying "[the film] aspires to be an all-American romantic tragedy. But the only emotion you feel for its doomed lovers is contempt for their stupidity in teaming up with an obvious nut case." Godfrey Cheshire of Variety had a positive view of the innocent couple played by Kevin Pollak and Grace Phillips, writing, "though it borrows from Bonnie and Clyde and other films, the involvement of the straight couple in this criminal odyssey is the tale’s one aspect that has a whiff of freshness." Cheshire concluded his review by stating that "Sutherland acquits himself well in all aspects of helming, including the action elements, and a range of top-flight tech work is led by Ric Waite’s sharp lensing. It's just a shame so much expertise is lavished on such banal, annoyingly redundant material." Critic Ben Hoffman did not like the film in 1997 because "the actors have to do and say some pretty ridiculous things." Truth or Consequences, N.M. was included in Magill's Cinema Annual 1998: A Survey of the Films of 1997, the book states: "poisoned by negative reviews, the film did not go into wide release and died aborning at the box office", adding that "the film was more about consequences than truth, the consequences of idiots on a spree, and the consequences of both characters and filmmakers making bad choices."

Dale Winogura of Boxoffice liked the film, especially the first half, and was appreciative of the acting. He wrote, "Kiefer Sutherland overcomes some of the faults with a sleek stylistic sheen and rapid pacing in the early stages... [and] Gallo turns a typical loser part into a sympathetic antihero, and Dickens supports him with an equally strong and rounded portrayal." Leslie Rigoulot of Film Scouts called the motion picture "a good ride, not a great one." David Nusair of Reel Films Reviews wrote in 2016, "Although the movie boasts a handful of compelling interludes in its first half (e.g. Sutherland's Curtis explains the difference between good guys and bad guys to Gordon), Truth or Consequences, N.M. doesn't really achieve anything resembling momentum until somewhere around the halfway mark - after which point the film morphs into a relatively entertaining caper that's been infused with a number of unexpectedly compelling sequences."

=== Legacy ===
In 2015, Chris Bumbray of JoBlo.com cited it as an example of a "Tarantino clone" film, alongside Keys to Tulsa and Things to Do in Denver When You're Dead. In 2024, Den of Geek ranked it ninth on a list of fifteen "Quentin Tarantino Knockoffs of the ’90s".

== See also ==
- Tarantinoesque film
