= Two Mothers for Zachary =

- Promotional advertisement
- Genre: Drama
- Written by: Linda Voorhees
- Directed by: Peter Werner
- Starring: Valerie Bertinelli; Vanessa Redgrave
- Theme music composer: Peter Rodgers Melnick
- Country of origin: United States
- Original language: English

Production
- Executive producers: Cary Brokaw; Randy Robinson
- Producers: Timothy Marx; Tom Kageff
- Production locations: Austin, Texas; Georgetown, Texas; Lockhart, Texas
- Cinematography: Neil Roach
- Editor: Martin Nicholson
- Running time: 96 minutes
- Production companies: Avenue Pictures; Hallmark Entertainment; RHI Entertainment

Original release
- Network: ABC
- Release: September 22, 1996

Two Mothers for Zachary is a 1996 ABC television film directed by Peter Werner and starring Valerie Bertinelli and Vanessa Redgrave. It is a true story adaptation of the Bottoms v. Bottoms family custody battle brought by a mother who disapproves of her daughter's homosexuality and the impact on her grandchild. It premiered on 22 September 1996. It was awarded a GLAAD Media Award for Outstanding Made for TV Movie.

== Premise ==
Nancy (Redgrave) disapproves of her daughter, Jody Ann's (Bertinelli) lesbianism and resolves to seek custody of her grandson, Zachary. A Virginia court grants custody of the boy to Nancy and now Jody is desperate to regain her son.

== Cast ==
- Valerie Bertinelli as Jody Ann Shaffell
- Vanessa Redgrave as Nancy Shaffell
- Colleen Flynn as Maggie Fergus
- Brian McGuire as Dwayne
- Kim Dickens as Jan
- Marietta Marich as Melba
- Marco Perella as Reporter 2
- James Gammon as Chalmer
- Adam and Aaron Rehmann as Zachary

== Production ==
Although the film is based on Sharon Bottoms's real-life custody battle, characters were renamed for the adaptation. Bertinelli explained, "I'm so much older than Sharon Bottoms is. But once we changed her name to Jody Ann Shaffell, it became much easier to see myself playing this role. I didn't have to play Sharon Bottoms but my interpretation of what would happen to a woman in that situation."

Bertinelli had previously learned of the Bottoms case years earlier when she appeared on the same edition of Larry King Live with Sharon Bottoms. Bottoms was appearing with her lawyer and argued her case against a Christian leader. Instead of concentrating on what she was intending to promote, Bertinelli became engaged in the previous debate and criticized the views of the religious representative.

Bertinelli also recalled how ABC significantly limited the expressions of affection between the two women. She said that she had never seen network lawyers so involved in a project: "They were there every day dictating how and when we could touch, hug, hold hands, and kiss each other."

In 1996, the case ended up back in the original juvenile court where it had started. The same judge who had made the initial ruling in the case, this time found Mattes to be an unfit parent in part because of her cooperation with the movie.

== Reception ==
In 1997, It was awarded a GLAAD Media Award for Outstanding Made for TV Movie.

People Magazine observed that "Redgrave could have played the part as a morally righteous monster, but she creates something more complex: a woman whose faith in maternal instinct causes her to harm her own child." Film critic John O'Connor thought the movie "comes down quite forcibly on the side of the mother but without turning the grandmother into an ogre." He also praised the "incredibly good performances" of Bertinelli and Redgrave, opining that Bertinelli's "sitcom past has consistently led to an underestimation of her subsequent performances", and Redgrave "accomplishes the extraordinary feat of making a rather dreadful woman seem almost sympathetic."

Television critic Tom Shales wrote that Bertinelli's portrayal of Bottoms is "an unimpeachable performance", while "Redgrave searches for the humanity in the monster she portrays and seems to find it." He notes that the movie "has an accurate and therefore unhappy ending, but that's how life is sometimes: Love doesn't always win out over hate." Robert Koehler wrote in the Los Angeles Times that "in what was meant to be a blow for lesbian motherhood, the movie is skittish of revealing any more than a light kiss between the two women, so the filmmakers weakly try to compensate for their lack of spine by piling on the rants from moralist types and other angry heterosexuals just to get the message home."

== See also ==
- List of made-for-television films with LGBTQ characters
