= Supreme Court of Virginia =

Highest court in the U.S. state of Virginia

- Interactive map of Supreme Court of Virginia
- 37°32′22″N 77°26′8″W
- Established: 1779
- Jurisdiction: Virginia
- Location: Richmond, Virginia
- Coordinates: 37°32′22″N 77°26′8″W
- Authorised by: Virginia Constitution
- Appeals to: Supreme Court of the United States (cases concerning federal law only)
- Judge term length: 12 years
- Number of positions: 7
- Website: Official website

Chief Justice of Virginia
- Currently: Cleo Powell
- Since: January 1, 2026
- Jurist term ends: July 30, 2030

The Supreme Court of Virginia is the highest court in the Commonwealth of Virginia. It primarily hears direct appeals in civil cases from the trial-level city and county circuit courts, as well as the criminal law, family law and administrative law cases that are initially appealed to the Court of Appeals of Virginia. Established in 1779 as the Supreme Court of Appeals, the Supreme Court of Virginia is one of the oldest continuously active judicial bodies in the United States.

== History of the Supreme Court of Virginia ==
=== Colony of Virginia ===
The Supreme Court of Virginia has its roots in the seventeenth century English legal system, which was instituted in Virginia as part of the Charter of 1606 under which Jamestown, Virginia, the first permanent English settlement in North America, was established. In 1623, the Virginia House of Burgesses created a five-member appellate court, which met quarterly to hear appeals from the lower courts. Meeting on the first day of March, June, September, and December, it became known as the Quarter Court.

The June term became unnecessary over the years, and in 1661, the Quarter Court became the General Court with original and appellate jurisdiction in both civil and criminal matters. It was a court of last resort for the Virginia colonists except in those rare circumstances when an appeal could be made to the king in England. Its members were appointed by the king on the basis of social standing, property, and the proximity of their estates to the colonial capital, Williamsburg. Though the judges were generally most capable, the majority possessed no formal legal training.

=== Commonwealth ===
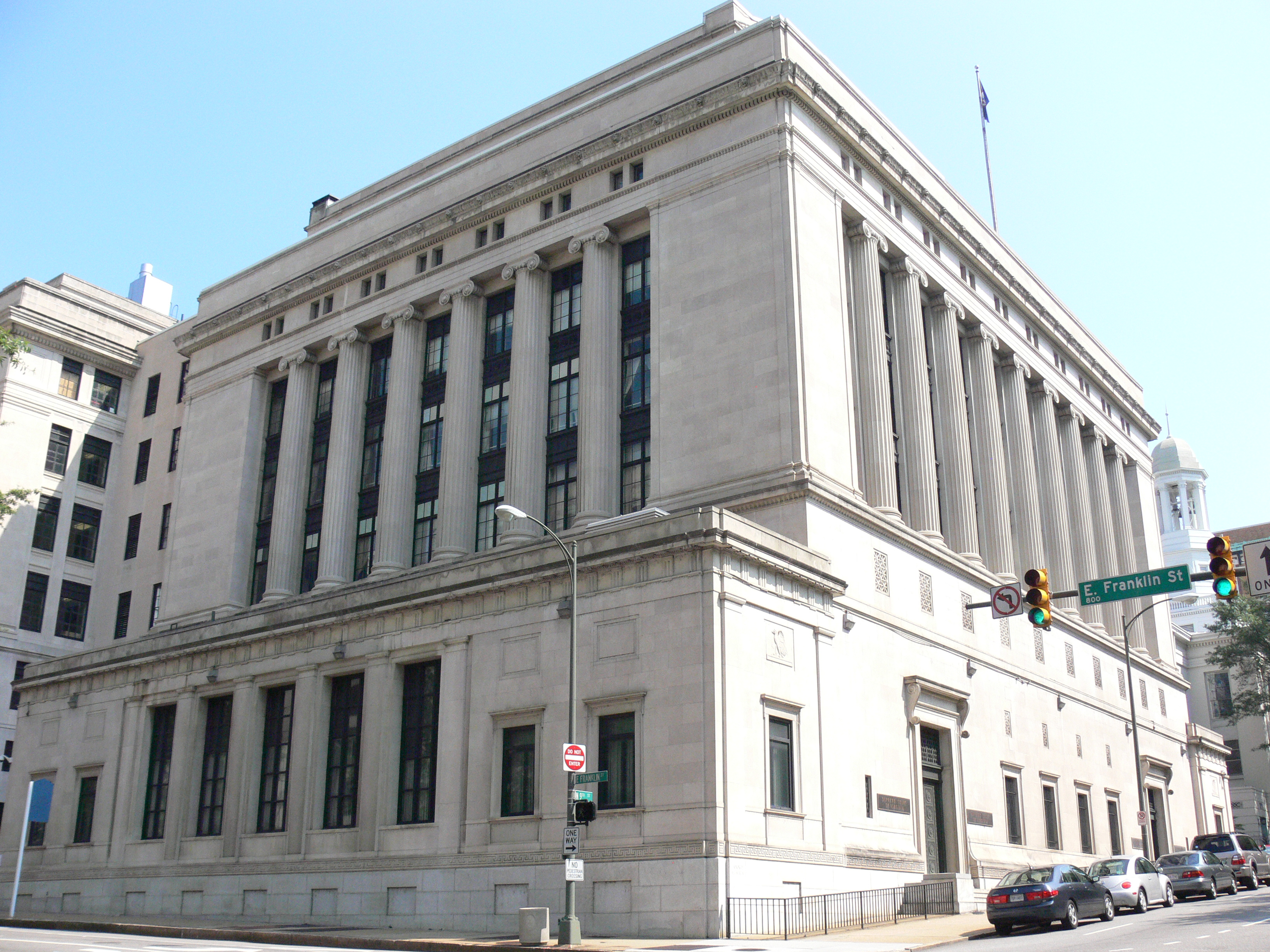
The Supreme Court building in Richmond

At the close of the Revolutionary War, the court system was reorganized. An act of the new General Assembly in 1779 created four superior courts, including the Supreme Court of Appeals, to be composed of judges of the other three existing courts: the Admiralty, the General, and the Chancery Courts. The Supreme Court of Appeals, which served as a model for the United States Supreme Court, first convened in Williamsburg on August 30, 1779. Shortly thereafter, the Court was moved to Richmond and held its sessions in the Henrico County Courthouse. Its jurisdiction was primarily appellate, and its members were elected by the legislature.

Among the court's first members were several distinguished legal scholars and jurists as well as leaders of the revolutionary period. Edmund Pendleton, who served Virginia as a delegate to the First Continental Congress, was selected by the judges as its first president. George Wythe, the mentor of Thomas Jefferson and signer of the Declaration of Independence, and John Blair Jr., who later served on the United States Supreme Court, were also members of Virginia's first Supreme Court. Other notable members were William Fleming, the third governor of Virginia and Paul Carrington.

Until 1788, the judges did not render written opinions or give reasons for their decisions. Pendleton felt that the policy of no written opinions preserved a semblance of unity for the court and lent more credence to their decisions. Thomas Jefferson disagreed and began recording the decisions of the court in his reports. The court convened on the tenth day of April and met for twenty-four days unless they were able to complete their business sooner.

A legislative act of 1788 provided that the court should be entirely separated from the other courts with five judges to be elected by joint vote of both houses of the General Assembly. These men were commissioned by the Governor and appointed for life on good behavior. This resulted in placing the judges beyond control of the legislature once on the bench, and the court continued to function in this manner for more than half a century.

The Reform Convention of 1850–51 again reorganized the judiciary by limiting the terms of the justices to twelve years and providing for their election by popular vote. The state was divided into five judicial sections, and each candidate was required to be at least thirty-five years old and to reside within the section he wished to represent. The resulting Constitution of 1851 also required the court to state in writing its reasons for reversing or affirming a judgment or a decree.

Following the turmoil of the Civil War, the Constitution of 1870 altered the method of selecting judges and reestablished election by joint vote of both houses of the General Assembly, retaining the term of twelve years. The constitution also required that annual sessions be held away from Richmond in the localities of Wytheville, Staunton, and Winchester. This mandate from the days of horse and buggy travel continued into the twentieth century, with sessions being held in Staunton as late as September 1970. In recent years, however, the court has held panels to hear petitions for appeal outside of Richmond during the summer. These sessions are held for the convenience of the attorneys who would otherwise have to travel to Richmond and also to provide a higher profile for the court outside of Richmond.

By constitutional amendment in 1928, the number of justices was increased to seven and the title of the presiding officer of the court was changed from President to Chief Justice. At the same time, the amendment significantly increased the power given the Supreme Court.

== Jurisdiction of the Virginia Supreme Court ==
Although the Supreme Court of Virginia possesses both original and appellate jurisdiction, its primary function is to review decisions of lower courts, including the Court of Appeals, from which appeals have been allowed.

The court's original jurisdiction is limited to cases of habeas corpus, mandamus, prohibition, and writs of actual innocence based on DNA or other biological evidence. It also has original jurisdiction in matters filed by the Judicial Inquiry and Review Commission relating to judicial censure, retirement, and removal of judges.

Appeals are taken directly to the Supreme Court in most civil cases tried by circuit courts. However, the Court of Appeals has intermediary jurisdiction over appeals in domestic relations cases, including divorce and annulment, child custody, and child and spousal support; the Court of Appeals also has intermediary jurisdiction over appeals from administrative agencies and the Workers' Compensation Commission. The Court of Appeals has intermediary jurisdiction over all appeals in traffic and criminal cases except where the death penalty has been imposed. The decision of the Court of Appeals is final in domestic relations appeals, administrative and workers' compensation appeals, and traffic and criminal appeals where no incarceration is imposed; the Supreme Court has no jurisdiction in these cases unless it initially determines that the appeal involves a substantial constitutional question as a determinative issue or matters of significant precedential value.

Most appeals to the Supreme Court are discretionary, meaning the court has the authority to decide whether to hear the appeal. Appeals of right, meaning the court must consider the appeal, are available only in cases involving the State Corporation Commission, disciplinary action against attorneys for violations of Virginia's Rules of Professional Conduct, and imposition of the death penalty.

== Procedure ==
Discretionary appeals make up the bulk of the court's docket. A discretionary appeal begins when a petition for appeal is filed with the clerk of the court. Petitions are assigned to a law clerk or staff attorney for initial research, culminating in a memorandum summarizing the pertinent facts and evaluating the legal issues raised by the petition and any brief in opposition filed in response to the petition. If the law clerk, staff attorney, or brief in opposition identify any procedural defects in the petition, it is referred to a panel of two justices who may dismiss it with or without prejudice depending on the nature of the defect. (When a petition is dismissed without prejudice, the petitioner has an opportunity to correct the procedural error and file a new petition. When a petition is dismissed with prejudice, the appeal ends and the judgment of the lower court is affirmed.) Otherwise, the case is then placed on the docket for consideration by a panel of three justices.

When each panel sits, the petitioner may present up to ten minutes of oral argument. Alternatively, in a limited number of cases, the petitioner may present oral argument to the Chief Staff Attorney, who then presents the case to the panel for decision. The justices on each panel review the petition and the brief in opposition with the assistance of the memorandum prepared by the law clerk or staff attorney. A single justice may grant an appeal, even if the other two justices do not concur. If the petition is denied, the appeal ends and the judgment of the lower court is affirmed. If the petition is granted, the second phase of the appeal leads to the case being argued on the merits to the full court.

The court sits in six, week-long sessions to hear cases on the merits each year. The term begins the week after Labor Day in September and ends in mid-June. All sessions are held in Richmond and generally fall six weeks apart, although the recess between the November and January sessions is longer to accommodate the intervening holidays. During each recess, the justices research the cases awaiting argument, draft and review opinions in cases already heard, consider petitions for appeal, and attend to administrative duties. Cases docketed for argument on the merits include those discretionary appeals for which a petition for appeal was granted, appeals of right for which no petition was necessary, and cases within the court's original jurisdiction.

The justice who will prepare the opinion for the court in any given case is determined by lot before each session begins. Seven slips of paper are prepared by the clerk of the court with one slip bearing the number "I"; the other slips are blank. The slips are placed in a hat, and the member of the court drawing the marked paper writes opinions in the first, eighth, and fifteenth, etc., cases on the docket. The justice immediately below him/her in seniority is responsible for the second, ninth, and sixteenth cases, and so on until all cases are assigned.

During session, the court customarily sits with the justices seated in order of seniority. The Chief Justice is seated in the center with the justice next in seniority on their right, the justice third in seniority on the chief justice's left, and so on in alternating order such that the newest justice is seated on the far left. This arrangement may be disrupted if a senior justice replaces an active member of the court who is recused from hearing a case. Attorneys for each side are usually allowed fifteen minutes each to present their arguments. The justices often interrupt the attorneys to ask questions on some issue in the case.

Typically, the justices hear oral arguments each morning and meet that afternoon for private deliberation of the cases heard that morning. The member designated to write the in a case opinion directs discussion of it by asking the justice seated at the conference table to the right for comments. The justices then comment in turn with the member designated to write the opinion speaking last. This discussion and debate provide the opinion writer guidance to prepare an opinion reflecting the views of a majority of the justices. Once a justice has completed a draft of his opinion, copies are circulated to the other members of the court and the Court Reporter. The court meets again before the next session to review and revise the circulated drafts until they receive final approval. Opinions are made public on the last day of each session, usually the very next session after argument, and are published in the Virginia Reports.

== Court organization ==
The court appoints a clerk, an executive secretary, a court reporter, a chief staff attorney, and the State Law Librarian, each of whom serves at the pleasure of the court.

The clerk maintains records of qualified attorneys, the decisions of the court, and other administrative records. The clerk's office also receives, processes, and maintains permanent records of all appeals and other official documents filed with the court.

The executive secretary serves as secretary to the Judicial Council and Judicial Conference and provides assistance to the Chief Justice and the court in the administration of the judicial system. This includes oversight of the magistrate system, as well as fulfilling the public relations, legislative affairs, training, purchasing, payroll and human resources, information technology, and technical support needs of the judicial system. Prior to 2005, the executive secretary was required to be a resident of the Commonwealth and a member of the Virginia State Bar for at least five years but these qualifications have been waived by statute.

The chief staff attorney supervises the court's permanent staff attorneys and paralegals, who primarily assist the court with research on petitions for appeal and include specialists in the court's original jurisdiction, such as habeas corpus petitions and review of capital sentences.

The court reporter and his staff assist with editing opinion drafts and supervise the compilation, indexing, printing, and publication of the written opinions of the court in the Virginia Reports.

The State Law Librarian supervises the State Law Library for the use of the court, judges and judicial staff, state officials, and attorneys. The library includes legislative and judicial materials from all 50 states, as well as the court's archives and most Virginia law schools' legal periodicals; as an official Federal Depository Library, it also receives official publications and legislative, administrative, and judicial materials from the United States government. While library staff respond to public inquiries, the library is not open to the public.

Each justice also personally appoints an administrative assistant and two law clerks who serve at the pleasure of the appointing justice and work under his or her direction. Assigned duties typically include assistance with legal research, editing opinion drafts, and reviewing petitions for appeal along with the court's permanent staff attorneys.

== The Virginia judicial system ==
Article VI, Section 4, of the Constitution of Virginia places upon the Chief Justice of the Supreme Court of Virginia the responsibility of supervising the administration of the entire court system of the Commonwealth. The Chief Justice may temporarily assign any judge of a circuit court to any other circuit court and may recall a retired circuit court judge to active duty. The Chief Justice may also designate a retired judge, an active district court judge, or an active circuit court judge, with his/her consent, to assist with a congested workload in any district. Other responsibilities of the Chief Justice include presiding over the various committees charged with improving the administration of justice in Virginia.

The Virginia judicial system comprises the Supreme Court, a Court of Appeals, circuit courts in thirty-one judicial circuits, general district and juvenile and domestic relations district courts in thirty-two districts, and magistrates in offices in thirty-two districts. Three advisory/administrative bodies have been created by the legislature to aid in the operation of the court system: the Judicial Inquiry and Review Commission, the Judicial Council, and the Committee on District Courts.

The aim of the Virginia judicial system is to assure that disputes are resolved justly, promptly, and economically through a court system unified in its structures and administration. A competent staff of judges and court personnel, uniform rules and practices, and adequate funding are necessary to accomplish this function and to provide the citizens of the Commonwealth of Virginia with the best possible judicial system.

== Court seal ==

Though it is seldom used except on the admissions certificates issued to members of the Virginia State Bar, the Supreme Court has its own seal which is distinct from the Seal of Virginia. The Court's seal is remarkably similar to the mural Justice, Raphael and Giovanni da Udine, in the Sala di Costantino, Vatican Palace, Rome, 1519-1520. It depicts a seated female figure looking at a balance which she holds up in her left hand, her other hand resting on the neck of an ostrich. In ancient Egypt, the hieroglyph for justice was an ostrich tail feather. The origin of the seal is not known. It was adopted by court order on October 11, 1935. There were many prints made of this image over the centuries. During a ceremony to celebrate the Court's 225th anniversary, the seal was used for the first time in many years on the cover of the programs given to guests, and also appears on certificates of admission and other ceremonial documents issued by the Court. An engraved image of the court seal has hung in the courtroom opposite the state seal since 2015. The lesser state seal is also depicted on the Justices' chairs and on a medallion over the entrance to the main courtroom.

== Current composition ==
The court presently is made up of seven justices, each elected by a majority vote of both houses of the General Assembly for a term of twelve years. To be eligible for election, a candidate must be a resident of Virginia and must have been a member of the Virginia State Bar for at least five years. Vacancies on the court occurring between sessions of the General Assembly may be filled by the Governor for a term expiring thirty days after the commencement of the next session of the General Assembly. The Chief Justice presently is chosen by a vote of the seven justices for a term of four years. There is no statutory limit to the number of four-year terms to which a Chief Justice may be elected. However, the Court has stated that the justices internally adopted a two-term limit.

State law requires justices, like all Virginia jurists, to retire no later than twenty days after the commencement of the next regular session of the General Assembly following their seventy-third birthday. The court may designate up to five retired justices to serve as senior justices, each for a renewable one-year term. Senior justices may sit with the court either to hear petitions for appeal or to hear cases on the merits, particularly to replace any of the seven active justices who may be recused from hearing a specific case. In addition, a retired justice who has not been designated as a senior justice may sit with the court by special designation.

=== Active justices ===
Name	Born	Start	Term ends	Mandatory retirement	Law school	Partisan control at election	
Name	Born	Start	Term ends	Mandatory retirement	Law school	House of Delegates	Senate
Cleo Powell, Chief Justice	January 12, 1957 (age 69)	August 1, 2011 (Note: Re-elected to second 12-year term that began on August 1, 2023.)	July 31, 2035	January 28, 2031	Virginia	Republican (+18)	Democratic (+4)
Cleo Powell, Chief Justice	January 12, 1957 (age 69)	August 1, 2011	July 31, 2035	January 28, 2031	Virginia	Republican (+4)	Democratic (+4)
D. Arthur Kelsey	October 9, 1961 (age 65)	February 1, 2015	January 31, 2027	January 30, 2035	William and Mary	Republican (+34)	Republican (+1)
Stephen R. McCullough	February 15, 1972 (age 54)	March 3, 2016	March 2, 2028	January 30, 2046	Richmond	Republican (+32)	Republican (+2)
Teresa M. Chafin	October 4, 1955 (age 71)	September 1, 2019	August 31, 2031	January 30, 2029	Richmond	Republican (+2)	Republican (+2)
Wesley G. Russell Jr.	1970 (age 55–56)	July 1, 2022	June 30, 2034	February 2, 2044	George Mason	Republican (+4)	Democratic (+4)
Thomas P. Mann	March 11, 1965 (age 61)	August 1, 2022	July 31, 2034	February 1, 2039	American	Republican (+4)	Democratic (+4)
Junius P. Fulton III	1958 (age 67–68)	January 1, 2026	December 31, 2037	February 3, 2032	William and Mary	Democratic (+2)	Democratic (+2)

=== Senior justices ===
Name	Active start	Active end	Senior status start	Law school
LeRoy F. Millette Jr.	August 19, 2008	July 31, 2015	July 31, 2015	William and Mary
William C. Mims	April 1, 2010	March 31, 2022	March 31, 2022	GWU; Georgetown (LLM)

=== Living former justices ===
- John Charles Thomas, former Justice (because Justice Thomas returned to the practice of law after he resigned from the court, he is not currently subject to recall for service on the Court as practicing attorneys are not eligible to receive retirement benefits from the VJRS, which is a requirement for service as a Senior Justice)
- G. Steven Agee, former Justice (Justice Agee resigned from the Court in order to take his seat on the United States Court of Appeals for the Fourth Circuit; so long as he remains on active service in the federal court system, he will be ineligible for recall to service on the Court)
- Barbara Milano Keenan, former Justice (Justice Keenan resigned from the Court in order to take her seat on the United States Court of Appeals for the Fourth Circuit; so long as she remains on active service in the federal court system, she will be ineligible for recall to service on the Court)
- Cynthia D. Kinser, former Justice (Chief Justice 2011-2014) (because Chief Justice Kinser returned to the practice of law after she retired from the court, she is not currently subject to recall for service on the Court as practicing attorneys are not eligible to receive retirement benefits from the VJRS, which is a requirement for service as a Senior Justice)
- Jane Marum Roush, former Justice (because Justice Roush has not retired under the Judicial Retirement Plan, she is not eligible for recall to service on the Court)
- Elizabeth A. McClanahan, former Justice. (Retired to become Dean of Appalachian School of Law, and subsequently took a position with the Virginia Tech Foundation).
- Elizabeth B. Lacy, retired Justice. Justice Lacy concluded her service as a Senior Justice on December 31, 2019.

== Notable cases ==
- Hite v. Fairfax (1786)
- Martin v. Hunter's Lessee (1816)
- Buck v. Bell (1927)
- Naim v. Naim (1950)
- Lucy v. Zehmer (1954)
- Scull v. Virginia ex rel. Comm. on Law Reform and Racial Activities (1959)
- NAACP v. Button (1963)
- Loving v. Virginia (1967)
- Lund v. Commonwealth (1977)
- Landmark Communications, Inc. v. Virginia (1978)
- Winston v. Lee (1985)
- Roe v. Roe (1985)
- Bottoms v. Bottoms (1995)
- United States v. Virginia ("The VMI case") (1996)
- Arlington County v. White (2000)
- Atkins v. Virginia (2002)
- Virginia v. Black (2003)
- Martin v. Ziherl (2005)
- Virginia v. Moore (2006)
- Scott v. McDougle (2026)
