= Kim Dickens =

American actress

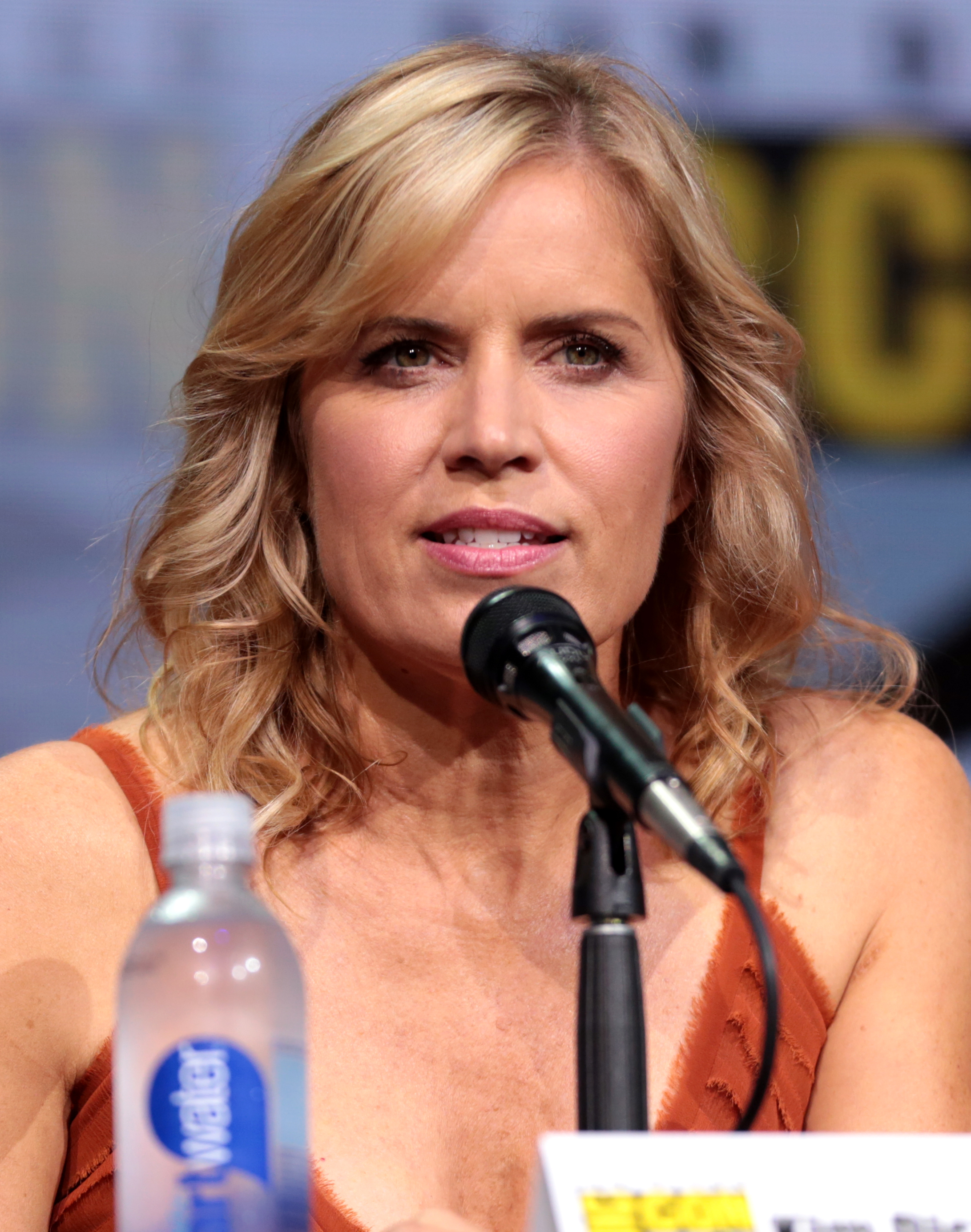
- Dickens at the 2017 San Diego Comic-Con
- Born: Huntsville, Alabama, U.S.
- Education: Vanderbilt University (BA)
- Occupation: Actress
- Years active: 1990–present
- Partner: Leisha Hailey (2017–present)

Kim Dickens is an American actress. She is known for starring as Madison Clark in the AMC horror drama series Fear the Walking Dead (2015–2018; 2022–2023), Joanie Stubbs in HBO's Deadwood (2004–2006; 2019), and Detective Rhonda Boney in Gone Girl (2014).

She has also starred as Kate Baldwin in the Netflix political drama House of Cards (2015–2017), Cassidy Phillips on the ABC television series Lost (2006–2009) and has had film roles in Mercury Rising (1998), Hollow Man (2000), House of Sand and Fog (2003), The Blind Side (2009), and Miss Peregrine's Home for Peculiar Children (2016).

== Early life and education ==
Dickens was born in Huntsville, Alabama, to Pam (Clark) Howell and Justin Dickens, a country-western singer. She graduated from that city's Lee High School and attended Vanderbilt University in Nashville, Tennessee, where she earned a Bachelor of Arts in communications. Dickens soon moved to New York City, where she worked as a waitress, to continue her studies at the Lee Strasberg Theatre and Film Institute; she graduated from the American Academy of Dramatic Arts.

== Career ==
=== 1990s ===
Dickens made her stage debut in a student production of David Mamet's Sexual Perversity in Chicago, at Vanderbilt University. In 1995, she made her professional screen debut in Alan Taylor's comedy film Palookaville, playing Vincent Gallo's character's girlfriend. Dickens spent the following year playing supporting roles in the made-for-television films Voice from the Grave and Two Mothers for Zachary. In 1997, Dickens returned to film, playing the female leading role opposite Vincent Gallo again in neo-noir thriller Truth or Consequences, N.M., directed by Kiefer Sutherland. The film received negative reviews from critics. In 1998, she appeared in Great Expectations, a film adaptation of the Charles Dickens's novel, and had the female leading roles in Zero Effect and Mercury Rising. In 1999, she starred alongside Antonio Banderas in the comedy film, The White River Kid.

=== 2000s ===
In 2000, Dickens had co-starring roles in films Committed opposite Heather Graham, Hollow Man with Elisabeth Shue and Kevin Bacon, and The Gift starring Cate Blanchett. The following year, she played the lead in the independent film Things Behind the Sun. She received acclaim and an Independent Spirit Award for Best Female Lead nomination. Later in 2001, Dickens was a regular cast member in the short-lived CBS police drama series, Big Apple. In 2003, she co-starred opposite Felicity Huffman and Eric Stoltz in the Showtime miniseries Out of Order.

During the 2000s, Dickens mostly worked on television, playing Joanie Stubbs, the madam, in the HBO western Deadwood from 2004 to 2006. She was nominated for the Screen Actors Guild Award for Outstanding Performance by an Ensemble in a Drama Series in 2007 for this role. She was a regular cast member in the unaired HBO comedy series, 12 Miles of Bad Road starring Lily Tomlin and Mary Kay Place. She had recurring roles on Lost and Friday Night Lights. In film, Dickens co-starred in House of Sand and Fog (2003) with Jennifer Connelly and Ben Kingsley, Thank You for Smoking (2005), Wild Tigers I Have Known (2006), Red (2008) and The Blind Side (2009).

=== 2010s ===
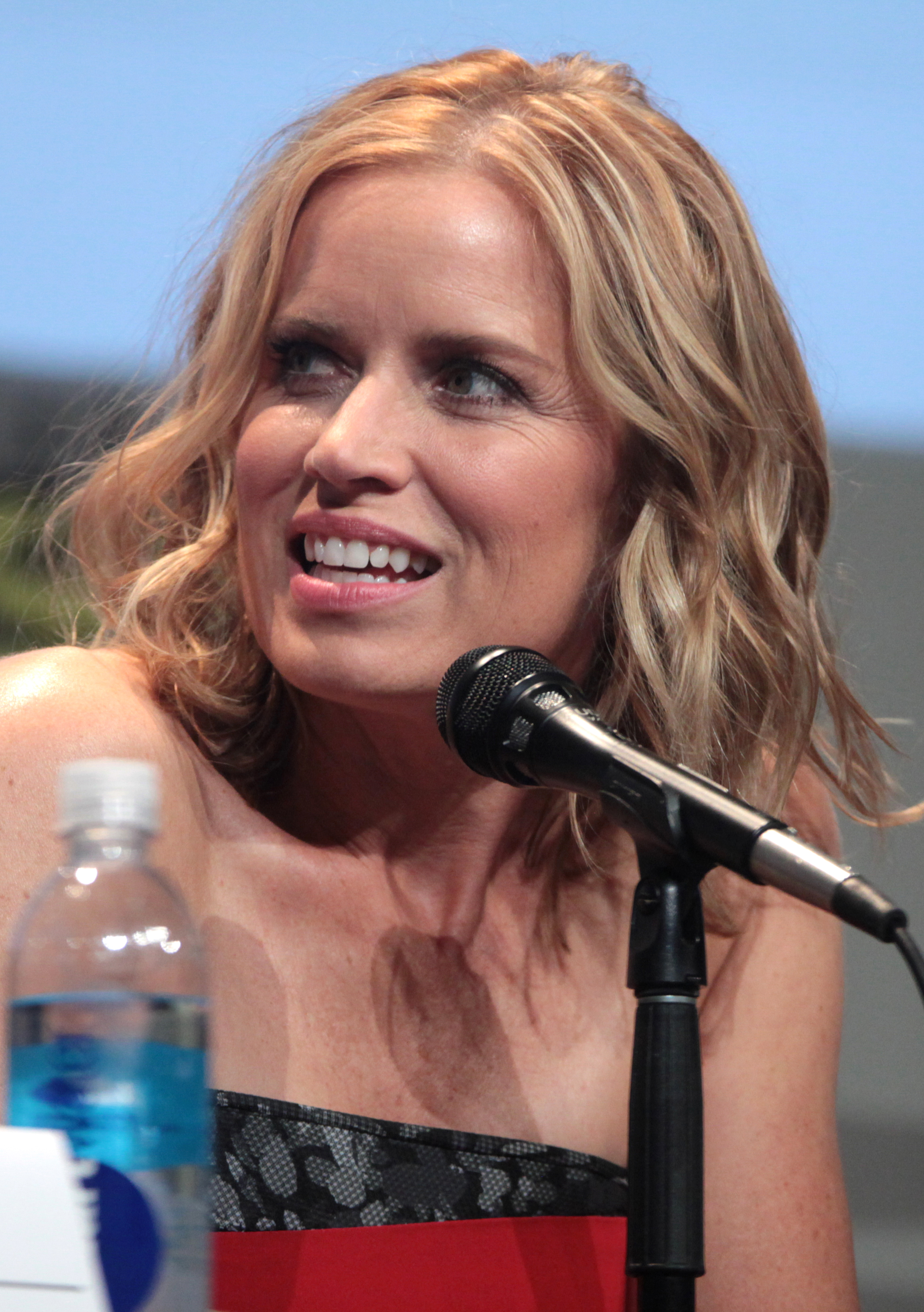
Dickens at the 2015 San Diego Comic-Con

From 2010 to 2013, Dickens was a regular on the HBO ensemble drama series, Treme, as chef Janette Desautel. From 2013 to 2014, she had a recurring role as Colette Jane in the FX crime drama, Sons of Anarchy. In 2015, she had a recurring role in the Netflix political drama House of Cards. In film, she co-starred in Footloose (2011) and At Any Price (2012). In 2014, she had a major supporting role as Detective Rhonda Boney in the psychological thriller film Gone Girl, directed by David Fincher, and in 2016, co-starred as the lead character's mother in Tim Burton's film Miss Peregrine’s Home for Peculiar Children.

In August 2015, Dickens began playing Madison Clark in The Walking Dead companion series Fear the Walking Dead on AMC. Dickens left the series in June 2018. She returned to the series in 2022.

=== 2020s ===
Dickens appeared in the 2021 film Land.

In December 2021, it was announced on Talking Dead that Dickens would be returning to Fear the Walking Dead in the seventh season and would be a series regular in its eighth season. Dickens herself made a surprise guest appearance on the show to make the announcement to fans personally.

== Personal life ==
Dickens moved to Los Angeles in the late 1990s. She is currently in a relationship with musician and actress Leisha Hailey, known for being a member of the musical duo the Murmurs, as well as her role as Alice Pieszecki on The L Word.

== Filmography ==
=== Film ===
Year	Title	Role	Notes
1995	Palookaville	Laurie	
1997	Truth or Consequences, N.M.	Addy Monroe	
1998	Zero Effect	Gloria Sullivan	
1998	Great Expectations	Maggie	
1998	Mercury Rising	Stacey	
1999	The White River Kid	Apple Lisa	
2000	Committed	Jenny	
2000	Hollow Man	Sarah Kennedy	Nominated — Blockbuster Entertainment Award for Best Supporting Actress - Science Fiction
2000	The Gift	Linda	
2001	Things Behind the Sun	Sherry	Nominated — Independent Spirit Award for Best Female Lead
2003	House of Sand and Fog	Carol Burdon	
2004	Goodnight, Joseph Parker	Muriel	
2005	Thank You for Smoking	Jill Naylor	
2006	Wild Tigers I Have Known	The Counselor	
2007	Waiting	John's Wife	Short film
2008	Red	Carrie	
2009	One Way to Valhalla	Jenny	
2009	The Blind Side	Mrs. Boswell	
2011	Footloose	Lulu Warnicker	
2012	At Any Price	Irene Whipple	
2014	Gone Girl	Detective Rhonda Boney	Nominated — Central Ohio Film Critics Association Award for Best Ensemble; Nominated — Georgia Film Critics Association Award for Best Ensemble
2016	Miss Peregrine's Home for Peculiar Children	Maryann Portman	
2018	Lizzie	Emma Borden	
2019	The Highwaymen	Gladys Hamer	
2021	Land	Emma	
2022	The In Between	Vickie	
2022	The Good Nurse	Linda Garran	
2027	An Innocent Girl		Filming

=== Television ===
Year	Title	Role	Notes
1995	New York News	Unknown	Episode: "Cost of Living"
1996	Swift Justice	Annie Peters	Episode: "Out on a Limb"
1996	Voice from the Grave	Terry Deveroux	Television film
1996	Two Mothers for Zachary	Nancy	Television film
1997	Spin City	Veronica	Episode: "Kiss Me, Stupid"
1997	Heart Full of Rain	Susan Doyle	Television film
2001	Big Apple	Sarah Day	8 episodes
2003	Out of Order	Danni	6 episodes
2004–2006	Deadwood	Joanie Stubbs	33 episodes Nominated — Screen Actors Guild Award for Outstanding Performance by an Ensemble in a Drama Series
2006	Numb3rs	Crystal Hoyle	2 episodes
2006–2009	Lost	Cassidy Phillips	4 episodes
2008	12 Miles of Bad Road	Jonelle Shakespeare	6 episodes
2008	1%	Rhonda	Unsold television pilot
2008–2009	Friday Night Lights	Shelby Saracen	11 episodes
2009	FlashForward	Kate Stark	Episode: "137 Sekunden"
2010	Reviving Ophelia	Le Anne	Television film
2010–2013	Treme	Janette Desautel	36 episodes
2013	Second Sight	Samantha Wilde	Unsold television pilot
2013–2014	Sons of Anarchy	Colette Jane	7 episodes
2013	White Collar	Jill	Episode: "Quantico Closure"
2014	Red Zone	Helen Weller	Unsold television pilot
2015–2017	House of Cards	Kate Baldwin	9 episodes
2015–2018; 2022–2023	Fear the Walking Dead	Madison Clark	51 episodes Lead role (seasons 1–4, 8); Guest star (season 7); Nominated — Saturn Award for Best Actress on Television (2016–2017)
2016–2018; 2021	Talking Dead	Herself	7 episodes
2019	Deadwood: The Movie	Joanie Stubbs	Television film
2020	Briarpatch	Eve Raytek	9 episodes
2025	The Better Sister	Nancy Guidry	8 episodes

=== Video games ===
Year	Title	Voice role	Notes
2020	Half-Life: Alyx	Scientist	
