= Colleen Flynn =

American actress

- Occupation: Actress
- Years active: 1988–present

Colleen Flynn is an American actress. In 1995, Flynn earned a nomination for Primetime Emmy Award for Outstanding Guest Actress in a Drama Series for her performance in the episode "Love's Labor Lost" of NBC medical drama ER.

Flynn was regular cast member on the short-lived series Flipper and To Have & to Hold. She also appeared in a recurring roles on China Beach, The Practice, Judging Amy and Nip/Tuck. Flynn guest-starred on television series such as The X-Files, Roswell, Crossing Jordan, Without a Trace, The Drew Carey Show, Everwood, The Closer, Cold Case, House and Grey's Anatomy.

Her film credits include Last Exit to Brooklyn, Serving in Silence: The Margarethe Cammermeyer Story, Two Mothers for Zachary, Clear and Present Danger, Pay It Forward and Project X.

== Filmography ==
=== Film ===
Colleen Flynn film credits
Year	Title	Role
1989	Last Exit to Brooklyn	Ruthie
1991	Late for Dinner	Adult Jessica Husband
1993	The Temp	Sara Meinhold
1994	Clear and Present Danger	Coast Guard Captain
2000	Pay It Forward	Woman on Bridge
2012	Project X	Mrs. Stillson

=== Television ===
Colleen Flynn television credits
Year	Title	Role	Notes
1988	The Equalizer	Woman on Phone	Episode: "Video Games"
1990–1991	China Beach	Dr. Colleen Flaherty Richards	3 episodes
1991	Equal Justice	Kerry Lynn	3 episodes
1995	ER	Jodi O'Brien	Episode "Love's Labor Lost"
1995–1996	Flipper	Dr. Pamela Blondell	22 episodes
1996	Two Mothers for Zachary	Maggie Fergus	TV movie
1997	Orleans	Paulette Charbonnet	8 episodes
1997	The Devil's Child	Ruby Martin	TV movie
1997	The X-Files	Michele Fazekas	Episode: "Detour" (S5.E4)
1998	To Have & to Hold	Carolyn McGrail	13 episodes
2000	The X-Files	Colleen Azar	Episode: "All Things" (S7.E17)
2000–2004	Judging Amy	Lolly Wetzel	7 episodes
2001	Roswell	Rebecca Turner	1 episode
2002	Crossing Jordan	Katherine Fielding	1 episode
2002	Without a Trace	Katherine Kent	Episode: "Silent Partner"
2004	The Practice	Wendy Stuart	3 episodes
2005	Everwood	Chief of Human Resources	1 episode
2005–2006	Nip/Tuck	Dr. Allamby	4 episodes
2006	Cold Case	Emily Simmons	1 episode
2007	House	Enid (patient's mother)	Episode: "The Jerk"
2008	Grey's Anatomy	Nancy Mercer	1 episode
2008	Sweet Nothing in My Ear	Priscilla Scott	TV movie
2018	Better Call Saul	Committee Member	1 episode
