= Bottoms v. Bottoms =

1995 American child custody case

- Court: Supreme Court of Virginia
- Full case name: Pamela Kay Bottoms v. Sharon Lynne Bottoms
- Decided: April 21, 1995
- Citation: 457 S.E.2d 102

Case history
- Appealed from: 444 S.E.2d 276 (1994)

Court membership
- Judges sitting: Christian Compton, Barbara Milano Keenan, Henry Hudson Whiting, Elizabeth Bermingham Lacy

Case opinions
- Decision by: Compton
- Dissent: Keenan

Bottoms v. Bottoms, 457 S.E.2d 102 (Va. 1995), was a landmark child custody case in Virginia that awarded custody of the child to the grandmother instead of the mother, primarily because the mother was a lesbian. In April 1993, Kay Bottoms sued her daughter, Sharon Bottoms, for custody of Sharon Bottoms' son, Tyler Doustou. On April 5, 1993, Judge Buford Parsons ruled that Sharon Bottoms was an unfit parent and Kay Bottoms was awarded custody of her grandson. Sharon Bottoms was allowed visitation rights two days a week, but Tyler was not allowed in his mother's home or to have any contact with his mother's partner.

== Background ==
Sharon Bottoms married Dennis Doustou when she was 18. Though they separated a few months later, Sharon discovered she was pregnant. On July 5, 1991, Tyler Doustou was born.

Sharon lived with her mother, Kay Bottoms, for the first few months after Tyler was born in Henrico County. On Memorial Day, 1992, Sharon met April Wade at a picnic. They began dating and in September of that year, Sharon and Tyler moved in with April. A month after that, Sharon and April had a commitment ceremony, pledging to stay together for life.

Sharon Bottoms initially struggled with the responsibilities of raising an infant, so Tyler spent much of his early life with his grandmother. However, after the commitment ceremony, Sharon pledged to be a better mother to Tyler. As such, she told Kay that she would be seeing less of Tyler. In response, in March 1993, Kay Bottoms "asked the local family court for custody and got it."

== Hearing ==
At the circuit court appeal hearing in April 1993, Sharon Bottoms admitted that she had hit Tyler twice, cursed in front of him, and had lived on welfare for a year.

Regarding her relationship with her female partner, April Wade, "Sharon acknowledged that she and April -- whom Tyler calls "Addle"—had kissed and gently caressed each other in front of the boy." Court-appointed psychologists did not find that Tyler had suffered ill effects from being in the care of his mother and her partner. Moreover, Dennis Doustou testified on behalf of Sharon Bottoms, saying of Kay Bottoms to reporters: "The woman is cold-hearted...It's no reason to take a child from his mother. That's totally wrong."

Sharon Bottoms additionally testified that Kay Bottoms' boyfriend, who lived with Kay, had sexually molested her when she was young.

== Verdict ==
The Virginia Circuit Court judge Buford M. Parsons ruled that, since homosexual sex was illegal in Virginia, Sharon Bottoms was a criminal because she "admitted in this court that she is living in an active homosexual relationship." "Parsons wrote that "the mother's conduct is illegal.... Her conduct is immoral and ... renders her an unfit parent." Sharon Bottoms was allowed visitation rights two days a week, but Tyler was not allowed in his mother's home or to have any contact with his mother's partner, April Wade."

== Appeal ==
The Court of Appeals of Virginia reversed the ruling the next year, granting Sharon Bottoms custody of her son, saying "The fact that a mother is a lesbian and has engaged in illegal sexual acts does not alone justify taking custody of a child from her and awarding the child to a non-parent." However, on further appeal, the Virginia Supreme Court returned custody to the grandmother.

== See also ==
- Two Mothers for Zachary, film adaptation.
