= 2024 Islamabad High Court judges' letter =

Pakistani judges' letter protests intelligence agency interference

The 2024 IHC judges' letter contained allegations from six judges of the Islamabad High Court (IHC) regarding interference by the Inter-Services Intelligence (ISI) in judicial affairs. This unprecedented disclosure, implicating executive interference in judicial matters, ignited a significant controversy in Pakistan in April 2024.

Supreme Court of Pakistan

== Timeline ==
On 26 March 2024, six serving judges of the Islamabad High Court (IHC) wrote a letter to the Supreme Judicial Council of Pakistan (SJCP), alleging interference by the Inter-Services Intelligence (ISI) in judicial matters. The letter, authored by six judges: Mohsin Akhtar Kayani (senior puisne judge), Tariq Mehmood Jahangiri, Babar Sattar, Sardar Ejaz Ishaq Khan, Arbab Muhammad Tahir and Saman Rafat Imtiaz, documented instances of pressure on judges through the abduction and torture of their relatives and secret surveillance within their residences. Additionally, they questioned the existence of a state policy aimed at intimidating and coercing judges. The six judges also stated in the letter that they had raised the issue with the Chief Justice of the IHC Aamer Farooq before who had informed the six judges that he had "spoken to the DG-C of ISI and had been assured that no official from ISI will approach the judges of the IHC". However, despite this assurance from the IHC Chief Justice, the six judges wrote that interference by intelligence operatives persisted. Judges specifically cited Tyrian White case as one of the only matters that attracted "pressure" from intelligence officials. Judges wrote "considerable pressure was brought to bear on judges who had opined that the petition was not maintainable, by operatives of the ISI, through friends and relatives of these judges.”

Subsequently, the next day on 27 March, Chief Justice of Pakistan (CJP) Qazi Faez Isa convened a full court session to investigate the allegations raised by the judges. On that very day, former Prime Minister and founder of the Pakistan Tehreek-e-Insaf (PTI), Imran Khan, released a statement commending the six judges. He praised the six judges who have drawn attention to the concerning condition of the higher judiciary, and advocated for an impartial investigation into the issue. Former Islamabad High Court (IHC) judge Shaukat Aziz Siddiqui also remarked that the complaint lodged by the six judges served as validation for him. He noted that when he raised similar concerns in 2018, he was isolated.

On 28 March, in a highly anticipated response, CJP Qazi Faez Isa said that the “interference by the executive” in the affairs and judicial workings of judges “will not be tolerated”. The same day, a meeting was held between CJP Isa and Prime Minister Shehbaz Sharif which also raised widespread concerns, with legal experts noting its unusual nature. Following this meeting, CJP Isa convened a second full court session to address the issue. During the meeting, a proposal was made to establish an inquiry commission led by a retired judge of "impeccable integrity" to investigate the matter.

On 30 March, the PM Shehbaz Sharif in a cabinet meeting approved the formation of an inquiry commission chaired by former Chief Justice of Pakistan Tassaduq Hussain Jillani. However, the oppositional (PTI) rejected the government's decision to establish an inquiry commission. and demanded the resignation of the CJP Isa as well Chief Justice of Islamabad High Court Aamer Farooq due to their perceived "inaction" regarding the interference of intelligence agencies in judicial affairs.

In a collective letter signed by over 300 lawyers and more than a dozen members of civil society, a large group of lawyers dismissed the appointment of a "powerless" one-man commission by the federal cabinet to probe these claims and urged the Supreme Court to initiate suo motu proceedings to investigate the allegations. Furthermore, they called on the Pakistan Bar Council and all bar associations to promptly convene a convention of lawyers to decide on a unified approach for preserving the independence of the judiciary.

On 1 April, Tassaduq Hussain Jillani, in a letter to PM Shehbaz, withdrew from heading an inquiry commission to investigate the allegations. Concurrently, the Supreme Court took suo motu notice of the allegations raised by the six IHC judges and established a seven-member bench, including the CJP Isa, Justices Mansoor Ali Shah, Justices Yahya Afridi, Justice Jamal Khan Mandokhail, Justice Athar Minallah, Justice Musarrat Hilali, and Justice Naeem Akhtar Afghan, to adjudicate the issue. However, PTI rejected the seven-member bench led by the CJP and insisted that the matter be heard by the full court rather than "like-minded judges." Additionally, they demanded for the proceedings to be telecast live. The same day, during a session of the National Assembly, PTI leaders also brought up the issue and urged for the discussion of the judges' letter in parliament, with its chairman Gohar Ali Khan suggested that parliament should adopt a resolution condemning the interference of intelligence agencies. However, Speaker of the National Assembly Ayaz Sadiq stated that considering the sensitivity of the matter, he suggests that if the issue was under judicial consideration, it would be prudent to await the outcome of the case.

On 2 April, all eight judges of the IHC, including the Chief Justice of Islamabad High Court Aamer Farooq and the six who authored the letter, received threatening letters containing a "chemical powder" from an unknown sender. The Chief Justice Farooq noted that the high court had been threatened. Simultaneously, judges of the Supreme Court as well of the Lahore High Court (LHC) also reported receiving similar letters. PM Shehbaz announced that the government would initiate an investigation into the letters containing "suspicious powder" received by judges of the Supreme Court, LHC and IHC. On 5 April, Prime Minister Shehbaz, CJP Isa as well Chief Minister Punjab Maryam Nawaz also received similar threatening letters. PTI called for a inquiry into the threatening letters sent to judges and alleged that "sending threatening letters to judges is part of the government’s plot to intimidate and scare them so they could not give decisions based on justice and law."

On 3 April, a seven-member bench of the Supreme Court convened to address the allegations. CJP Isa emphasized that any threats to the judiciary's independence would not be tolerated and suggested the possibility of convening a full court for a suo motu case in the next scheduled hearing on 29 April. Supreme Court Justice Athar Minallah remarked that the letter addressed ongoing issues in Pakistan spanning the past 76 years and emphasized that "We can’t bury our heads like ostrich in the sands". The same day, PTI held a press conference and demanded that CJP Isa should not be part of the bench, stating that they believed his meeting with PM Shehbaz had made the case and his own conduct controversial.

On 5 April, The Pakistan Bar Council demanded a judicial commission composed of serving Supreme Court judges to investigate the matter impartially.

On 8 April, a former general secretary of the Islamabad High Court Bar Association (IHCBA) lodged a reference with the SJCP against senior puisne judge of IHC, Justice Kayani. The allegation stated that Justice Kayani "waged a war against the forces of Pakistan in a planned manner by inducing and convincing other judges of high court". Following this, the Islamabad Bar Council criticized the petition, denouncing it as "Baseless" and describing the reference as an egregious misuse of the legal system and a deliberate effort to undermine the judiciary. The IHCBA also petitioned the Supreme Court, and urged it to conduct an investigation into the letter.

On 19 April, Chief Justice of the Lahore High Court (LHC) Malik Shehzad Ahmed Khan also called for a full court meeting of LHC judges on 22 April to address concerns regarding the preservation of judicial independence following allegations raised by IHC judges.

On 24 April, a full-court session of the IHC unanimously decided to implement various measures, including the reactivation of 'empowered' inspection teams, aimed at curbing the purported interference of intelligence officials in judicial matters. Before the Supreme Court hearing on 30 April, the court consolidated a total of ten petitions seeking the court's intervention regarding the letter.

Judicial sources also observed a rise in mudslinging targeting judges, especially following the publication of the letter. On 28 April, IHC denounced what it termed as a 'malicious' social media campaign against Justice Babar Sattar - one of the six judges who authored the letter. The court strongly condemned the dissemination of confidential information, including the Sattar's family travel documents, which were leaked online.″

On 1 May, the Peshawar High Court in its report to the SC acknowledged interference by intelligence agencies in judicial matters. It disclosed that some judges had reported direct approaches from intelligence officials seeking favors in political cases and also acknowledged that judges faced life threats from "non-state actors" in Afghanistan when those political cases were decided impartially. The LHC in its reply submitted in the SC also acknowledged intelligence agencies' interference in judicial affairs. The Sindh High Court in its proposal submitted to the SC, emphasized the necessity of investigating interference in the judiciary by intelligence agencies and suggested prohibiting direct access to judges. While the Balochistan High Court noted that the grievances of IHC judges should have been addressed at the high court level.

As the Supreme Court reconvened with a six-judge bench on 30 April to address the judges' letter case, diverging opinions emerged. CJP Isa proposed legislation to regulate intelligence agencies, while two other senior judges, Justice Mansoor Ali Shah and Justice Athar Minallah, advocated judicial intervention to prevent future intrusions. Following the proceedings, PTI voiced its dissatisfaction with CJP Isa's conduct during the hearing of the case and alleged a divide within the judiciary, with the CJP Isa on one side and also demanded his disassociation from the bench.

== Reaction ==
An official of intelligence agency denied the claims made in the letter and said that “the accusations made by the honourable judges of IHC are frivolous in nature and out of context. The cases against the former prime minister Imran Khan are purely legal and have nothing to do with law enforcement agencies."

== Reception ==
One commentator called the letter the "strongest act of defiance", since the judges' stance against Pervez Musharraf's imposition of emergency rule in 2007.
