= Lubna =

Lubna, Lubná or Łubna may refer to:

== Places ==
=== Czech Republic ===
- Lubná (Kroměříž District), a municipality and village in the Zlín Region
- Lubná (Rakovník District), a municipality and village in the Central Bohemian Region
- Lubná (Svitavy District), a municipality and village in the Pardubice Region

=== Poland ===
- Łubna, Masovian Voivodeship
- Łubna, Pomeranian Voivodeship

== Other ==
- Lubna (given name), an Arabic feminine given name
- Lubna, transcribed Arabic for storax, the aromatic sap of the sweetgum tree used for making incense and perfume
- Lubna, a fictional character from the graphic novel series RanXerox
- Qays and Lubna, a virgin love story of the 7th century in Arabic literature
