= Open Fun Football Schools =

Danish international sports organization

The Danish organization Cross Cultures Project Association (CCPA) uses grassroots sports as a tool for social cohesion in society and post-conflict reconciliation. In 1998 they introduced the Open Fun Football Schools program in the war torn Bosnia and Herzegovina. The Open Fun Football Schools project is organized by CCPA in cooperation with the Football Association of Norway (NFF) The project has developed into a broad Nordic cooperation, which so far involves larger regional operations in the Balkans, the Caucasus, Moldova and the Middle East. Furthermore, CCPA has been UEFA Charity Partner since 2002. In 2009 they received the Sport for Peace Award at the Beyond Sport Awards.

The Open Fun football Schools is directed towards supporting the development of civil society and the strength of the project is to be found in its ability to generate social capital; strengthen relations between people and build community platforms engaging a wide scope of relevant stakeholders.

This program concentrates on bringing children from war zones together through football. In this way grassroots sport creates a “space” that is not politically contaminated. “Football constitutes a universal language, which can be used by everyone. It is a language of fun, enjoyment and team spirit that derive from the game” (CEO Anders Levinsen). Football is full of emotion and, therefore, football can function as a “driver” that unites people across cultural or religious differences. It is a new and joyful way of playing football, giving participants the chance to gain some new experiences. It is more important that children learn that playing football is “fun”.

== The fun football concept ==
The Open Fun Football Schools are built on the experience of what war is doing to people and how it is dividing communities. It is a humanitarian project that uses joyful games and the pedagogical “fun-football-concept” as a tool to stimulate the process of democracy, peace, stability and social cohesion in South Eastern Europe, Moldova and Trans Caucasus by re-establishing friendships and sports co-operation between otherwise opposed population groups. At the same time, they contribute to a promotion of football as a game.

== Impact ==
The project started in war-torn Bosnia-Herzegovina in 1998 with 12 football schools involving 2254 boys and girls, and 189 voluntary coaches and school leaders. Since then the project has evolved from being a reconciliation tool developed in the post-war context of Bosnia-Herzegovina to a tool to bridge understanding and tolerance across existing divides between population groups. In 2000 the schools had become a conflict-prevention measure in Macedonia. In the summer of 2003, Open Fun Football Schools staged a total of 78 schools involving 16,000 youngsters (13,000 boys and 3,000 girls) and 1,400 and school leaders from Bosnia-Herzegovina, Macedonia, Serbia and Montenegro. Since then the program has spread to the Caucasus and Moldova and the Middle East with schools in Georgia, Azerbaijan, Armenia, Moldova and Syria, Jordan, Lebanon and Iraq. Currently 750 Open Fun Football schools have been implemented for a total of 150,000 boys and girls from 7–12 years old and approximately 13,000 voluntary coaches and leaders have been trained during regional seminars according to the specific fun football concept (duration 3–5 days).

== Resources ==
ccpa.dk, Peoplebuildingpeace.org Open Fun Football Schools Sustainability Report 2006 International Platform on sport and Development www.playthegame.org
