= Mohsin Akhtar Kayani =

Justice of the Islamabad High Court

Justice of the Islamabad High Court
- In office 22 December 2015 – 29 April 2026

Justice of the Lahore High Court
- Incumbent
- Assumed office 30 April 2026

Personal details
- Born: 11 February 1970 (age 56) Rawalpindi, Pakistan
- Education: University of Punjab; Karachi University; University of Peshawar

Islamabad

Mohsin Akhtar Kayani (born 11 February 1970) is a Pakistani jurist who had been Justice of the Islamabad High Court from 22 December 2015 to 29 April 2026. Judicial Commission of Pakistan approved his transfer from Islamabad High Court to Lahore High Court on 28 April 2026.

== Early life and education ==
Kayani was born on 11 February 1970 in Rawalpindi to a Kayani Ghakar family.

He completed his matriculation from F.G. Boys High School in Islamabad, followed by his intermediate education in 1987 and graduation in 1989, both from F.G. College for Men in Islamabad. He obtained his LLB degree from the University of Punjab in 1994, and pursued his M.A. in political science from the same university during 1995–1996. Subsequently, he earned his LLM degree from Karachi University between 2001 and 2003, and completed his M.Sc. in Pakistan Studies in 2005.

He also attained a post-graduate diploma from the University of Peshawar, in collaboration with the University of Oslo.

== Career ==
Kayani became an advocate of the District Courts on 18 June 1995, and of the High Courts on 21 November 1997. He was enrolled as an Advocate of the Supreme Court of Pakistan on 19 June 2009.

In addition to his legal career, he has been actively involved in bar association politics. He initially served as Joint Secretary and later as General Secretary of the Islamabad Bar Association from 1997 to 1998 and from 2003 to 2004, respectively. He also served as President of the Islamabad High Court Bar Association from 2014 to 2015.

On 23 December 2015, he was appointed as a Judge of the Islamabad High Court (IHC). He was serving as the senior puisne judge of the IHC until his transfer by Judicial Commission of Pakistan on 28 April 2026. He was transferred to the Lahore High Court (LHC).

In October 2026, Kayani resigned citing personal reasons, including health concerns following a surgery, and “reasons of conscience”. His resignation came years before his retirement date — 10 February 2032. According to the LHC’s duty roster for November and December 2026, he was meant to preside over a single bench at the Rawalpindi registry.

== Controversy ==
On 26 March 2024, six judges of the Islamabad High Court, including Kayani, wrote a letter to the Supreme Judicial Council of Pakistan, alleging interference by the Inter-Services Intelligence in judicial matters. They cited instances of pressure on judges through the abduction and torture of their relatives and secret surveillance within their residences. Additionally, they questioned the existence of a state policy aimed at intimidating and coercing judges. Subsequently, the next day, Chief Justice of Pakistan (CJP) Qazi Faez Isa convened a full court session to investigate the accusations raised by the judges.
