= Lubna (given name) =

Lubna is an Arabic feminine given name. Notable people with the name include:

- Lubna of Córdoba, 10th century poet
- Lubna Agha (1949–2012), Pakistani artist
- Lubna Aslam (born 1977), Pakistani actress
- Lubna Azabal (born 1973), Belgian actress
- Lubna Faisal (born 1958), Pakistani politician
- Lubna bint Hajar, 6th century Arabic Islamic figure
- Lubna al-Hussein, Sudanese journalist
- Lubna Mohamed Zahir Hussain, Maldivian politician
- Lubna Jaffery (born 1980), Norwegian politician
- Lubna Marium (born 1954), Bangladeshi dancer
- Lubna Nasir, British-Pakistani oncologist
- Lubna Olayan (born 1955), Saudi businesswoman
- Lubna Al-Omair (born 1987), Saudi fencer
- Lubna Saleem Pervez, Pakistani jurist
- Lubna Khalid Al Qasimi (born 1962), first woman to hold a ministerial post in the United Arab Emirates
- Lubna Rehan (born 1979), Pakistani politician
- Lubna Salim, Indian actress
- Lubna Sarwath (born 1965), Indian social activist and economist
- Lubna Taha, Palestinian illustrator, writer and designer
- Lubna Tahtamouni (born 1976), Jordanian biologist and cancer researcher
