= University of Richmond School of Law =

Private law school in Richmond, Virginia, US

- Parent school: University of Richmond
- Established: 1870; 156 years ago
- School type: Private law school
- Dean: Jacob Rooksby
- Location: Richmond, Virginia, US; 37°34′38″N 77°32′19″W
- Enrollment: 392 (2024)
- Faculty: 58 (Full-time), 74 (Part-time) (2024)
- USNWR ranking: 62nd (tie) (2026)
- Bar pass rate: 79.59% (2023 first-time takers)
- Website: law.richmond.edu
- ABA profile: ABA Required Disclosures

The University of Richmond School of Law (abbreviated as Richmond Law) is the law school of the University of Richmond, a private liberal arts college in Richmond, Virginia. Richmond Law is ranked tied for 62nd in the US by U.S. News & World Report. With approximately 150 J.D. candidates per class year, the University of Richmond School of Law is accredited by the American Bar Association.

== History ==
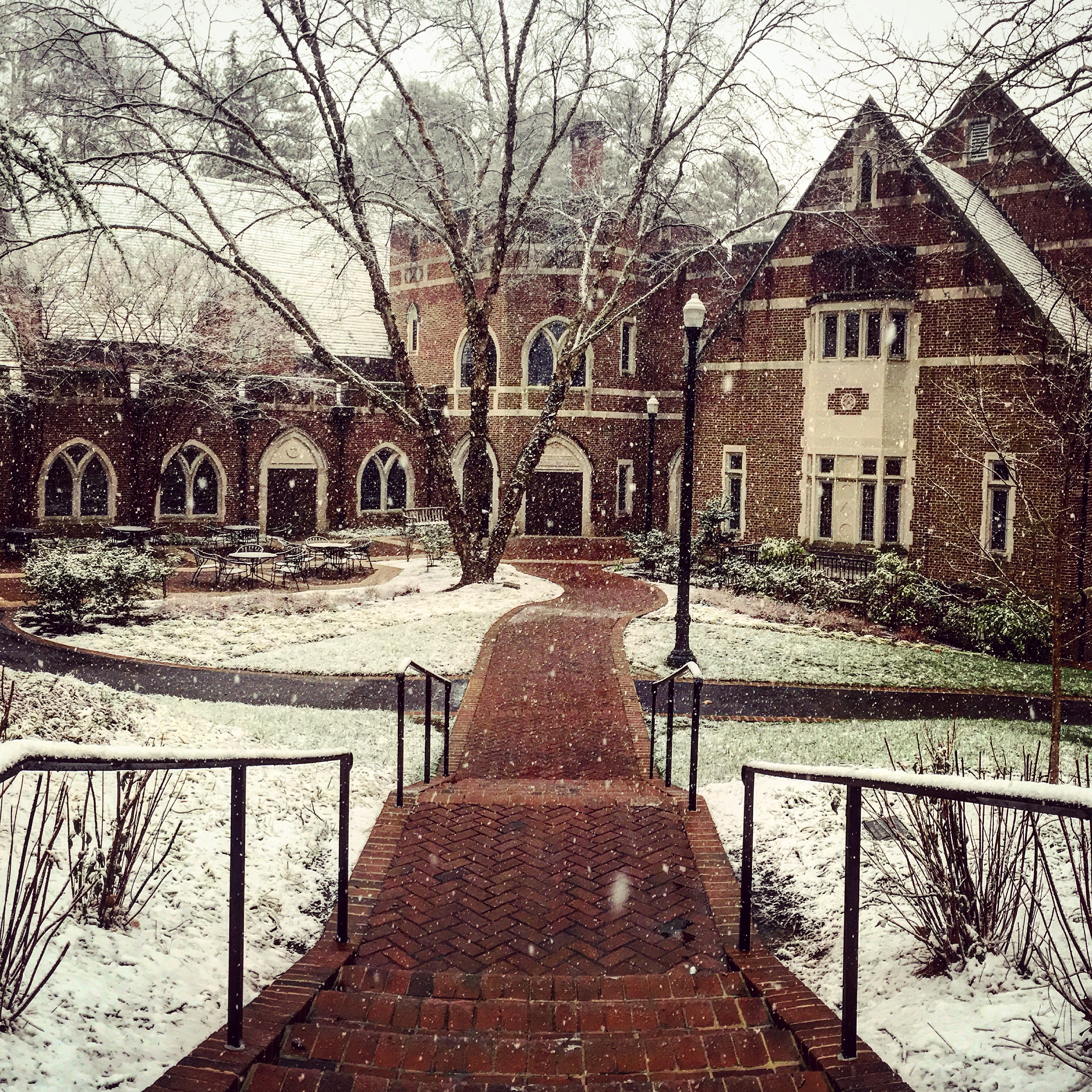
Entrance to the School of Law

The school was founded in 1870 as a college within the University of Richmond. In 1890, the family of the late T. C. Williams, a university trustee, donated $25,000 as the nucleus of an endowment for the law school. In recognition of this gift, the school was named The T. C. Williams School of Law in 1920. In 2022, the school changed the official name from the "T. C. Williams School of Law" to the "University of Richmond School of Law" in keeping with its naming principle that prohibits the use of names of people who engaged in enslavement or openly advocated the enslavement of people.

In 1914, Richmond College (as the university was then known), including its law department, moved from its location downtown to the present campus. Returning servicemen from World War I created space problems for the college and the law department had to be relocated to the old Columbia Building at Grace and Lombardy streets. In 1920, the law department was reorganized as a separate School of Law within what was now the University of Richmond.

The current Law School building, constructed in the Collegiate Gothic architectural style, was originally opened in 1954, and it was enlarged in 1972 and 1981. In 1991, the building was significantly expanded, renovated, and refurbished. The Law School building now provides modern and technologically equipped classrooms, seminar rooms, a law library, a moot courtroom, faculty and administrative offices, faculty and student lounges, and offices for most student organizations.

The Richmond School of Law was ranked tied for 66th in the 2024 ranking of law schools by U.S. News & World Report. According to US News, the school has 408 students with a student-to-faculty ratio of 5:1.

== Admissions ==
For the class entering in 2023, the University of Richmond School of Law accepted 41.46% of applicants, with 19.45% of those accepted enrolling. The average enrollee had a 164 LSAT score and 3.75 undergraduate GPA.

== Cost of attendance ==
The total cost of attendance (indicating the cost of tuition, fees, and living expenses) at Richmond Law for the 2020–21 academic year is $67,550. The Law School Transparency estimated debt-financed cost of attendance for three years, based on data from the 2020–21 academic year, is $202,650. For the 2018–2019 school year, 67% of entering students received scholarships. The 50th percentile grant amount of scholarships was $35,000.

== Employment ==
According to Richmond School of Law's official 2018 ABA-required disclosures, 85% of the Class of 2018 obtained full-time, long-term, JD-required employment nine months after graduation (i.e. as attorneys). Richmond's Law School Transparency under-employment score is 11%, indicating the percentage of the Class of 2018 unemployed, pursuing an additional degree, or working in a non-professional, short-term, or part-time job nine months after graduation.

== Initiatives ==
Richmond Law has different initiatives focusing on expanding areas of the law such as intellectual property, wrongful convictions, and family law. The school founded its Intellectual Property Institute (IPI) in 2004, through which Richmond law students are able to obtain a certificate of concentration in Intellectual Property Law.

The Institute for Actual Innocence, founded in 2005, works to identify and exonerate wrongfully convicted individuals in the Commonwealth of Virginia. The institute is an academic program that partners students with local attorneys and community leaders to seek post-conviction relief for wrongfully convicted prisoners in the Commonwealth of Virginia. Three days before leaving office, President Obama commuted Dujuan Farrow's life sentence after the Institute for Actual Innocence submitted his case for clemency review.

== Publications ==
=== University of Richmond Law Review ===
The University of Richmond Law Review, founded in 1958, publishes four issues a year: the Annual Survey in November, the Symposium Issue in March, and two general issues in January and May. In addition, since 2015, the Law Review has published an online volume each year. Staff members are selected at the end of their first year of law school after participating in a journal competition, which takes into consideration students' grades and the results of a casenote and Bluebook exam.

=== Richmond Public Interest Law Review ===
The Richmond Public Interest Law Review (PILR) is a law review published by the University of Richmond School of Law. The journal, formerly known as the Richmond Journal of Law and the Public Interest, vol. 1 (1996) - vol. 19 (2016), focuses on issues pertaining to social welfare, public policy, and jurisprudence.

Publishing three annual volumes, PILR posts its articles and other related content online. Of these annual publications, two volumes are the following.

- The General Assembly in Review issue, an annual print volume focused exclusively on the legislative work of the Virginia General Assembly and its implications for the Commonwealth's citizens and future. Past topics have included discussions regarding state legislation aimed at reproductive rights, religious freedom, lyme disease, the reformation of ethics and conflict of interest laws, mental health court systems, and the sexual victimization of incarcerated juveniles.
- The PILR Symposium issue provides discussions of contemporary social welfare issues and controversial topics. Past topics have included veteran's law, privacy rights and the regulation of sexuality, gender equality in the twenty-first century, and wrongful convictions.

=== Richmond Journal of Law and Technology ===
The Richmond Journal of Law and Technology (JOLT) is a law review published by the School of Law. It was the first student-edited law review in the world to be published exclusively online.

First published on April 10, 1995, the journal focused on the impact of computer-related and other emerging technologies on the law. Today, JOLT publishes four issues per year containing a variety of technology-related articles including traditional intellectual property issues, telecommunication law, biotechnology, computer law, and emerging areas of constitutional law.

== Notable faculty ==
- Ronald J. Bacigal – Professor (1973–present); specializes in Criminal Law and Procedure; reporter of Criminal Decisions of the Court of Appeals of Virginia
- Harry L. Carrico (b.1916–d.2013) – Former visiting professor of Law and Civic Engagement and Jurist in Residence (2004–2013); former justice, Supreme Court of Virginia, 1961–2003, and Fairfax County Circuit Court judge, 1956–1961
- James Comey – Adjunct professor (1996–2001), terminated former director, Federal Bureau of Investigation; former deputy attorney general; former United States Attorney, 4th Circuit; former United States Attorney, 1st Circuit
- Marla Decker – Adjunct professor (1995-present); chief judge of the Court of Appeals of Virginia, former Virginia Secretary of Public Safety
- Tim Kaine – Adjunct professor (1988–1994); junior United States Senator, Virginia; 70th Governor of Virginia, 2005; 38th Lieutenant Governor of Virginia, 2001; former Mayor of Richmond, 1998
- Donald W. Lemons – Adjunct professor (1998–2000); John Marshall Professor of Judicial Studies (2000–2008), professor at Washington and Lee University School of Law (2008–present); Supreme Court of Virginia, justice, 2000–2022; Court of Appeals of Virginia, judge, 1998–2000; Circuit Court for the City of Richmond, judge, 1995–98;
- Harold Wren (b.1921-d.2016) – dean of the three law schools at the University of Louisville, Lewis & Clark College, and the University of Richmond

== Notable alumni ==
- Watkins Abbitt – U.S. Representative from Virginia, 1948–1973
- Les Adams – Member, Virginia House of Delegates
- Dave Albo – Former Member, Virginia House of Delegates
- Ward Armstrong – Former Minority Leader, Virginia House of Delegates
- Leon Bazile – Trial judge in the case of Loving v. Virginia
- José M. Cabanillas – Executive officer of the USS Texas, rear admiral, awarded the Bronze Star
- Fred H. Caplan, former justice of the Supreme Court of Appeals of West Virginia
- Ben Chafin – Virginia State Senator
- Teresa M. Chafin, Justice of the Supreme Court of Virginia
- Ben Cline – Congressman; Former Member of the Virginia House of Delegates
- Mary Daniel – Judge for General District Court Judge for the 26th Judicial District of Virginia
- Marla Decker – Chief Judge of the Court of Appeals of Virginia
- Jenna Ellis – former legal advisor for Donald Trump who pleaded guilty to one felony count of aiding and abetting false statements in writing
- Walter S. Felton, Jr. – Former Chief Judge of the Court of Appeals of Virginia
- Mark Herring – Former attorney general of Virginia, former member of the Senate of Virginia
- Lawrence L. Koontz, Jr. – Retired Justice of the Supreme Court of Virginia
- Jay Leftwich – Member, Virginia House of Delegates
- Lynwood Lewis – Virginia State Senator
- G. Manoli Loupassi – Former member, Virginia House of Delegates
- Stephen R. McCullough – Justice of the Supreme Court of Virginia
- Robert R. Merhige, Jr. – Former U.S. District Court Judge, Eastern District of Virginia
- Nathan H. Miller – Former Virginia State Senator
- Willis D. Miller – Former Justice of the Supreme Court of Virginia
- Chris Peace – Former Member, Virginia House of Delegates
- A. L. Philpott – Former Speaker of the Virginia House of Delegates
- Owen B. Pickett – U.S. Representative, 1987–2001
- Robert Nelson Pollard – Judge of the United States District Court for the Eastern District of Virginia
- A. Willis Robertson – U.S. Senator, 1946–1966
- Harvey E. Schlesinger – Senior U.S. District Judge, Middle District of Florida
- Harold Fleming Snead – Former Chief Justice of the Supreme Court of Virginia
- Frederick Pfarr Stamp Jr. – Judge of the United States District Court for the Northern District of West Virginia
- Richard Stuart – Virginia State Senator
- Tony Pham – Prosecutor and former acting director of U.S. Immigration and Customs Enforcement
- Saman Imtiaz – Justice at the Islamabad High Court (IHC) since 17 December 2021. She is the second woman judge to be appointed to the IHC
