= Bilquis Nasrum Minallah =

Pakistani politician

- بلقیس نَصْرٌمن اللہ
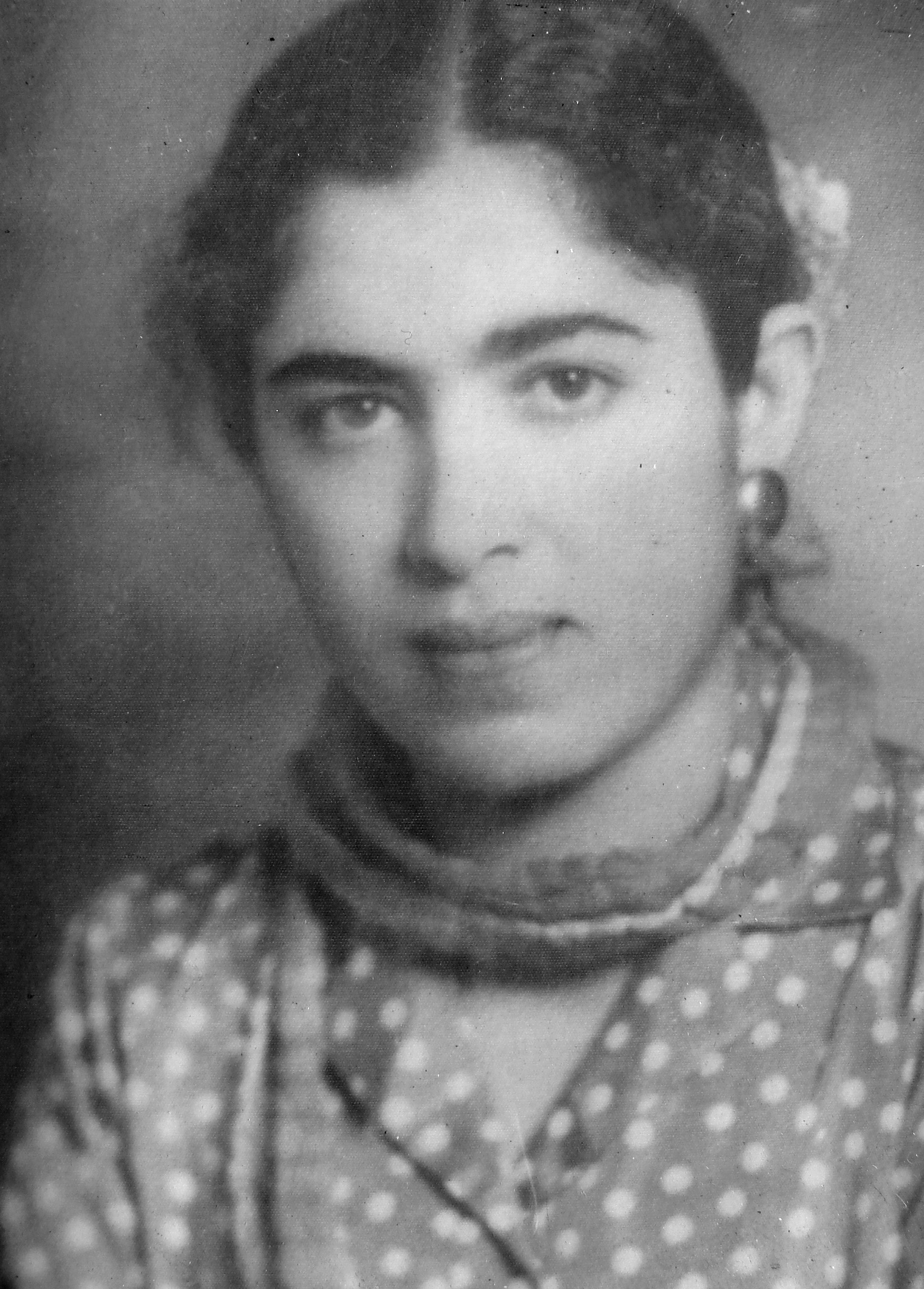

Member of the National Assembly for Khyber Pakhtunkhwa
- In office 20 March 1985 – 29 May 1988
- President: Muhammad Zia-ul-Haq
- Prime Minister: Muhammad Khan Junejo

Personal details
- Died: 1 August 2012 (aged 75–76)
- Resting place: Sirikot, Haripur, Pakistan
- Spouse: Nasrum Minallah
- Children: Athar; Samar; Fauzia; Akmal
- Education: Fatima Jinnah Medical College

Bilquis Nasrum Minallah (1936 – 1 August 2012) was a Pakistani politician who served as a Member of the National Assembly of Pakistan from 1985 to 1988.

Born to an ethnic Pashtun family, Minallah was educated at Fatima Jinnah Medical College in Lahore. She served as a Member of the National Assembly for Khyber Pakhtunkhwa, on a reserved seat for women.

She was married to Chief Secretary North-West Frontier Province Nasrum Minallah, and was the mother of current Justice of the Supreme Court of Pakistan, Athar Minallah, and human rights activist, Samar Minallah.

She died in Islamabad after a long illness in 2012, and was laid to rest in her native village of Sirikot in Haripur District.
