= Ghulam Azam Qambrani =

Pakistani jurist

Justice Ghulam Azam Qambrani

Judge at Islamabad High Court
- Incumbent
- Assumed office December 13, 2019

Personal details
- Born: April 24, 1971 (age 55) Balochistan, Pakistan
- Occupation: Justice

Ghulam Azam Qambrani (born April 24, 1971, in Balochistan, Pakistan) is a Pakistani jurist and a Judge at the Islamabad High Court.

== Education ==
Qambrani attended his primary school at Government Boys Middle School, Mastang. He then attended Government Boys High School where he obtained his matriculation certificate in 1986. He secured an LL.B degree from Law College, Quetta in 1993. In 2012, Qambrani passed the LL.M in Law examination.

== Career ==
After his education Ghulam Azam Qambrani was appointed Advocate at the Quetta District Court. In June 1997, he was appointed Advocate at the Islamabad High Court. On May 31, 2014, Qambrani was subsequently appointed an Advocate at the Supreme Court of Pakistan. Ghulam was elected Member Executive Committee of Supreme Court Bar Association in 2018. Before his appointment as Judge, he has previously handled civil and criminal defense cases in Lasbella and Balochistan High Court.

He was sworn in as an Additional Judge of Islamabad High Court on December 13, 2019.
