= Coaches Across Continents =

Soccer NGO

Coaches Across Continents is a UK and US based non-governmental organization aimed at improving the quality of life in low-income countries through soccer for social development.

== History ==
Coaches Across Continents was launched in June 2008 based on first-hand research in 60 countries. In its first year, the organization implemented programs at a site in Tanzania. In 2009, it expanded its program to sites in Malawi and Zambia. Since then it has expanded. According to the 2021 Annual Report it was by then working with 131 organisations in 113 countries and had three main brands: creating legacies, choice for women and coaching.

According to the 2022 Annual Report submitted to the Charity Commission for England and Wales - the organisation comprises two sister organisations: Coaches Across Continents Ltd (UK based) and Coaches Across Continents Inc (US based).

== Awards ==
2010 Featured Finalist Global Sports Forum Football for Education in Barcelona.

2009, the project won the Best New Project for Sport and Development at the inaugural Beyond Sport Awards in London.

Finalist for the 2009 SCORE4africa Football for Diversity Award

== Further information ==
- Coaches Across Continents Website
