= Vani (custom) =

Form of arranged or forced child marriage

Vani (Urdu: ونی), or Swara (سوارہ), is a custom where girls, often minors, are given in marriage or servitude to an aggrieved family as compensation to end disputes, often murder. Vani is a form of arranged or forced child marriage, and the result of punishment decided by a council of tribal elders named jirga. Some claim Vani can be avoided if the clan of the girl agrees to pay money, called Deet (دیت). Vani, sometimes spelled Wani or Wanni, is a Punjabi word derived from "vanay," meaning blood. It is also known as Sak and Sangchatti (سنگ چتی) in different regional languages of Pakistan.

Though laws in 2005 and 2011 have declared the practice illegal, the custom still continues to be practiced. In 2004, the Sindh High Court outlawed all such "parallel justice" systems. But the writ of government is weak in rural areas, and local police often turn a blind eye.

== Rationale ==
Hashmi and Koukab claim this custom started almost 400 years ago when two northwestern Pakistani Pashtun tribes fought a bloody war against each other. During the war, hundreds died. The Nawab, regional ruler, settled the war by calling a jirga of elders from both sides. The elders decided that the dispute and crime of the men be settled by giving their girls as Qisas, a retaliatory punishment.

Ever since then, tribal and rural jirgas have been using young virgin girls from 4 to 14 years old, through child marriages, to settle crimes such as murder by men. This blood for blood tradition is practiced in different states of Pakistan such as Punjab, Sindh, Baluchistan and KPK and tribal areas. A report by Pakistan's Law Commission states that sharia principle of Qisas is the rationale for Vani.

== Criticism ==
After the promulgation of the 1973 constitution, the Pakistani government, which made Sharia its prime legislative source, has forbidden and discouraged Vani as being un-Islamic and cruel.

Samar Minallah, a Pakistani activist and filmmaker, has criticized the practice. She notes that very often when there is a murder or a dispute, girls are given as compensation to the aggrieved party as reparation. The murderer gets away with his crime and one, or even more girls have to pay the price of the crime for the rest of their lives. Compensation marriages are largely accepted as a way of keeping the peace between tribes and families. However, under-aged girls torn from their homes in this manner often end up systematically abused and forced into a life of virtual slavery in the homes of their enemies.

== Cases ==
In 2008, a long-running blood feud in a remote corner of western Baluchistan province that started with a dead dog and led to 19 people, including five women, being killed and was resolved by handing over 15 girls, aged between three and 10, for marriage.

In 2012, 13 girls ranging from age 4 to 16 years were forced into marriage to settle a dispute with an allegation of murder between two clans in Pakistan. The case was tried by elders from the two groups, with a member of Balochistan state assembly, Mir Tariq Masoori Bugti, leading the jirga. The jirga’s verdict included Vani, that is an order that the 13 girls must be handed over as wives to members of opposing group, for a crime committed by one man who could not be found for the trial. The sentence was carried out, and Bugti defended the practice of Vani as a valid means to settle disputes.

Numerous other cases have been reported. In 2011, for example, a 12-year-old girl was handed over as wife to an 85-year-old man, under vani, for a crime alleged to have been committed by the girl’s father. In 2010, another politician participated as a member of a ‘‘jirga’’ and ruled in favor of ‘‘Vani’’.

The custom of Vani is very common in many regions of Pakistan. The Supreme Court of Pakistan served suo motu notices in 2012 to help reduce and stop the custom.

As per June 2020, report in The Express Tribune, a Jirga (a type of quasi-Kangaroo court) attempted ruling to give up a 13 year old girl in marriage to a 41 year old married man as Swara (punishment) for her brother's alleged disliked relation with his cousin, the Jirga's attempt was foiled by a close relative of the boy with help of police.

== Related customs ==
In Afghanistan, a similar custom is called Ba'ad, sometimes as Sawara.

== See also ==
- Child marriage
- Arranged marriage
- Watta satta
- Karo kari
- Baad (practice)
- Jirga
- Women related laws in Pakistan
- Forced marriage
