= Khadim Hussain Soomro =

Justice of the Islamabad High Court

- خادم حسین سُومرو

Justice of the Sindh High Court
- In office 14 April 2023 – 31 January 2025

Justice of the Islamabad High Court
- Incumbent
- Assumed office 1 Feb 2025

Personal details
- Born: 12 September 1975 (age 51)

Khadim Hussain Soomro (Urdu: خادم حسین سُومرو, born 12 September 1975) is a Pakistani jurist serving as a Justice of the Islamabad High Court (SHC) since his transfer from the Sindh High Court on 1 February 2025.

== Career ==
His was appointed as an additional judge of the SHC on 14 April 2023, and took the oath of office as a permanent judge of that court on 14 April 2024.
