= Sardar Muhammad Sarfraz Dogar =

Pakistani jurist

Chief Justice of the Islamabad High Court
- Incumbent
- Assumed office 14 Feb 2025
- Preceded by: Aamer Farooq

Justice of the Islamabad High Court
- Incumbent
- Assumed office 1 Feb 2025

Justice of the Lahore High Court
- In office 8 June 2015 – 31 January 2025

Personal details
- Born: 3 July 1968 (age 58)

Sardar Muhammad Sarfraz Dogar (born 3 July 1968) is a Pakistani jurist who has been a Justice of the Islamabad High Court since 1 February 2025 and also served as Acting Chief Justice of the Islamabad High Court (IHC). Other IHC justices and opposition leaders have come to criticize Dogar's immediate elevation to chief justice due to his lack of seniority on the IHC.

He previously served as the justice of the Lahore High Court from 8 June 2015 to 31 January 2025.
