= Muhammad Azam Khan (Pakistani judge) =

Justice of the Islamabad High Court

- محمد اعظم خان

Justice of the Islamabad High Court
- Incumbent
- Assumed office 20 January 2025

Personal details
- Born: 23 April 1968 (age 58) Bannu, Khyber Pakhtunkhwa, Pakistan
- Education: University of Peshawar

Muhammad Azam Khan (born 23 April 1968) is a Pakistani jurist who has served as an additional judge of the Islamabad High Court since 20 January 2025.

== Early life and education ==
Khan was born on 23 April 1968 in Bannu, West Pakistan. He completed his early education in Bannu and obtained an MSc degree in 1991 and an LLB degree in 1993 from the University of Peshawar.

== Judicial career ==
Khan began his judicial career as a civil judge on 2 December 1999 after selection by the NWFP Public Service Commission. He was promoted to senior civil judge on 27 December 2007 and to additional district and sessions judge on 15 July 2010.

He was elevated to district and sessions judge on 30 January 2018. He served in several judicial roles, including as a judge of the banking court, accountability court, anti-corruption court, and control of narcotic substances court in Islamabad. He also served as district and sessions judge for Islamabad East and West and held the position of judge at the National Command Authority.

Khan took oath as an additional judge of the Islamabad High Court (IHC) on 20 January 2025. He was sworn in as a permanent judge of the that court on 19 January 2026.
