= Columbia (Richmond, Virginia) =

Historic house in Virginia, United States

- U.S. National Register of Historic Places
- Virginia Landmarks Register
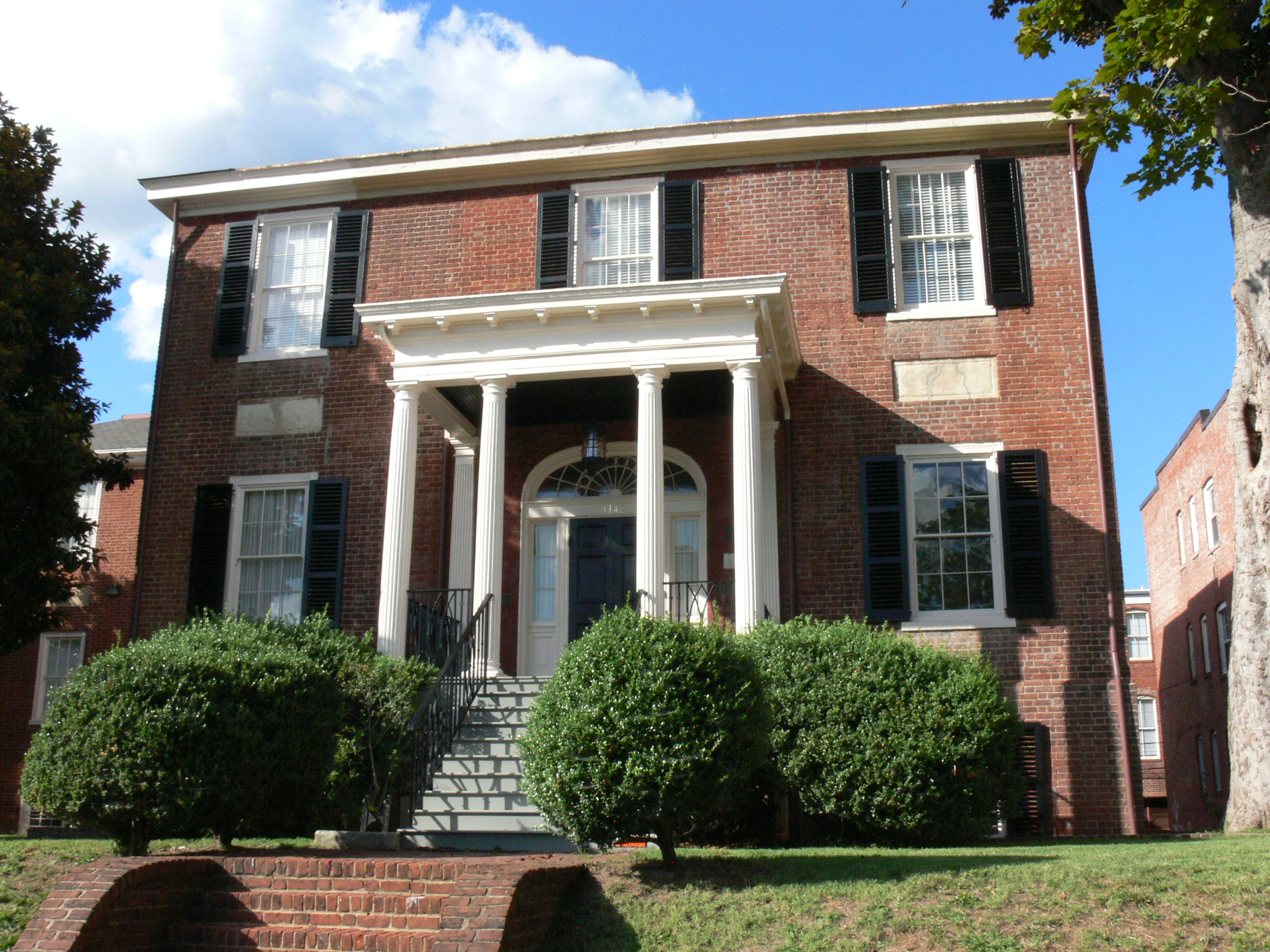
- Columbia House, July 2011

- Location within Virginia Location within the United States
- Location: 1142 W. Grace St., Richmond, Virginia
- Coordinates: 37°33′12″N 77°27′25″W
- Area: 0.4 acres (0.16 ha)
- Built: 1817
- Architectural style: Federal
- NRHP reference No.: 82004585
- VLR No.: 127-0045

Significant dates
- Added to NRHP: September 16, 1982
- Designated VLR: March 16, 1982

Columbia, also known as the Philip Haxall House, is a historic home located in Richmond, Virginia. A rare surviving Federal villa, Columbia was built in 1817-18 for Philip Haxall of Petersburg, who moved to Richmond in 1810 to operate the Columbia Flour Mills, from which the house derives its name. The building is a two-story, three bay Federal style brick dwelling on a high basement. The entrance features an elliptical fanlight opening sheltered by a one-story Doric porch that was added when the entrance was moved from the Lombardy Street side to the Grace Street side in 1924, when the building was expanded to house the T.C. Williams School of Law of the University of Richmond. In 1834 the Baptist Education Society purchased the house and it became the main academic building of Richmond College, later University of Richmond. It housed the School of Law from 1917 to 1954. In 1984 Columbia was purchased by the American Historical Foundation for its headquarters. The Foundation maintained its offices and a military museum at the property before selling Columbia in 2005. In 2013, Columbia was put up for auction and by late 2014 Thalhimer Realty Partners, Inc. (a Virginia-based division of Cushman & Wakefield) had purchased the property, repurposing the historic home from office space into Columbia Apartments.

It was listed on the National Register of Historic Places in 1982.
