= Inaam Ameen Minhas =

Justice of the Islamabad High Court

- انعام امین منہاس

Justice of the Islamabad High Court
- Incumbent
- Assumed office 20 January 2025

Personal details
- Born: 11 January 1970 (age 56)

Inaam Ameen Minhas is a Pakistani jurist who has served as a Justice of the Islamabad High Court (IHC) since 20 January 2025.

== Career ==
Minhas was appointed as a judge of the IHC on 20 January 2025.

In February 2025, he presided over proceedings related to petitions challenging amendments to the PECA Ordinance. During the hearing, Minhas raised questions regarding fake news and suggested procedural steps to address the issue.
