= Mary Daniel =

American judge

Mary Costello Daniel

General District Court Judge for the 26th Judicial District of Virginia
- Incumbent
- Assumed office June 1, 2020
- Preceded by: Ian Williams

Personal details
- Born: December 18 Winchester, Virginia
- Party: Formerly affiliated with the Democratic Party
- Education: University of Virginia, T.C. Williams School of Law at the University of Richmond
- Occupation: Judge, General District Court

Mary Costello Daniel is a General District Court Judge for the 26th Judicial District of Virginia.

== Early life and education ==
Daniel was born in Winchester, Virginia to the late Lewis M. Costello and Joy Hollar Costello, and raised in Frederick County, Virginia. She received her undergraduate degree from the University of Virginia. Daniel then obtained a juris doctor from the T.C. Williams School of Law at the University of Richmond.

== Career ==
Daniel began practicing law in 1993 in Martinsburg, West Virginia and moved to Berryville, Virginia, in 1996 to join the law firm of Hobert, Kerr & Perka P.C. In 1998, Daniel opened her own law practice in Winchester, Virginia. Daniel was the Virginia Managing Attorney at Booth, Strange & Daniel, a trade name for the Central Atlantic Legal Group, from late 2017 until May, 2020. Daniel also worked as a part-time assistant commonwealth's attorney in Winchester from 1998, prosecuting domestic violence and sexual assault cases.

In 2009, then-Delegate (later to become Judge) Clay Athey invited Daniel to interview for a vacant position, and she realized that a judgeship eventually might be possible for her. She then interviewed on-and-off for ten years. In March 2020, Daniel was appointed as a General District Court Judge for the 26th Judicial District of Virginia. She began her term on June 1, 2020.
