= Lubna Saleem Pervez =

Justice of the Islamabad High Court

Justice of the Islamabad High Court
- Incumbent
- Assumed office 13 December 2019
- Nominated by: Athar Minallah
- Appointed by: Arif Alvi

Deputy Attorney General Sindh High Court

Lubna Saleem Pervez is a Pakistani jurist who has been Justice of the Islamabad High Court (IHC) since 13 December 2019. She was appointed as an additional judge for initial term of one year. She is the first female judge of IHC since its inception in January 2011.

== Judicial career ==
Prior to becoming the judge of Islamabad High Court, she worked as Deputy Attorney General at the Sindh High Court.

She was nominated by Chief Justice of the Islamabad High Court, Athar Minallah for the judgeship. On 11 November 2019, the law ministry sent her nomination to Judicial Commission of Pakistan (JCP) headed by then Chief Justice of Pakistan, Asif Saeed Khosa. The JCP approved her nomination on 21 November 2019.

The Islamabad High Court Bar Association protested against her nomination stating that she being from the Sindh province, her nomination infringed upon the rights of local lawyers.

Among her first few orders were the granting of the bail to Sharjeel Memon in Sindh Roshan Program Scandal. She heard the bail petition alongside IHC Chief Justice Athar Minallah on 23 December 2019. The bench ordered National Accountability Bureau not to arrest Memon until 1 January 2020.
