= Baad (practice) =

Payment of a criminal's family's female as settlement among Kochi Pashtuns

Baad is a method of settlement and compensation whereby a female from a criminal's family is given to the victim's family as a servant or a bride. It is still practiced in certain areas of Afghanistan and Pakistan, mainly among the Kochis. Although baad is illegal under Afghan law, many of the victims do not know their rights, and still more are prevented from exercising them.

== Description ==
After a person commits a serious crime, a council of elders called jirga decides the punishment. The punishment for a smaller crime is a fine in the form of money or livestock. Standard penalty for a crime such as murder is for the offender's family to give a woman or girl to the victim's family. In theory, the woman or girl is given in forced marriage to a male in the victim's family. Baad sometimes leads to domestic violence.

The practice of baad has no Islamic basis, but is instead considered un-Islamic and is illegal. As per the Hadith, "A non-virgin woman may not be married without her command, and a virgin may not be married without her permission; and it is permission enough for her to remain silent (because of her natural shyness)." [Al-Bukhari:6455, Muslim & Others].

== Afghan law ==
Baad is a criminal offense under Article 517 of the 1976 Afghan Penal Code, but the Article applies only if a widow and woman above age 18 is given under Baad. According to Afghan law, the sentence for perpetrators of baad (i.e., forcing a woman into marriage and slavery through baad) cannot exceed two years of prison. No jirga elder or family is known to have been arrested or tried for taking or giving a woman or girl in baad. The practice of baad is mostly reported in Afghanistan's provinces of Kunar, Helmand and Balkh.

== See also ==
- Vani (custom)
- Watta satta
- Forced marriage
- Because I Am a Girl
- Arranged marriage
- Karo kari
- Women related laws in Pakistan
- Forced marriage
- Marriageable age
