= Saman Rafat Imtiaz =

Justice of the Islamabad High Court

- ثمن رفعت امتیاز

Justice of the Islamabad High Court
- In office 17 December 2021 – 29 April 2026

Justice of Sindh High Court
- Incumbent
- Assumed office 30 April 2026

Personal details
- Born: 8 June 1976 (age 50)
- Education: Beaconhouse Public School, Karachi (O-Levels, A-Levels); American University in Dubai (B.B.A); University of Richmond (Juris Doctor)

Islamabad

Saman Rafat Imtiaz (Urdu: ثمن رفعت امتیاز, born 8 June 1976) is a Pakistani jurist and has held the position of Justice at the Islamabad High Court (IHC) from 17 December 2021 to 29 April 2026. She is the second woman judge to be appointed to the IHC, following Lubna Saleem Pervez. On 28 April 2026, Judicial Commission of Pakistan appproved her transfer from Islamabad High Court to Sindh High Court. President Of Pakistan transferred him on 29 April 2026.

== Education ==
Imtiaz finished her O-Levels in 1992 and A-Levels in 1994 at Beaconhouse Public School, Karachi. She earned her B.B.A Degree in 1998 from the American University in Dubai and completed her Juris Doctor degree in 2001 from the University of Richmond.

== Career ==
In 2004, Imtiaz commenced her career as a lawyer and later established her own law firm in 2011 in Karachi, specializing in Corporate, Commercial, Banking, Tax, and other civil matters. Imtiaz was sworn in as an Additional Judge of the IHC on 17 December 2021.

She officially assumed the role of a permanent judge at the IHC on 29 November 2022. On 28 April 2026, Judicial Commission of Pakistan approved her transfer and on 29 April 2026 President of Pakistan transferred her to Sindh High Court on recommendation of Judicial Commission.

== Controversies ==
=== Allegations of harassment by intelligence agencies ===
On 26 March 2024, six judges of the Islamabad High Court, including Imtiaz, wrote a letter to the Supreme Judicial Council of Pakistan, alleging interference by the Inter-Services Intelligence in judicial matters. They cited instances of pressure on judges through the abduction and torture of their relatives and secret surveillance within their residences. Additionally, they questioned the existence of a state policy aimed at intimidating and coercing judges. Subsequently, the next day, Chief Justice of Pakistan (CJP) Qazi Faez Isa convened a full court session to investigate the accusations raised by the judges.
