= Muhammad Asif Reki =

Justice of the Islamabad High Court

- محمد آصف ریکی

Justice of the Islamabad High Court
- Incumbent
- Assumed office 1 February 2025

Additional Judge of the Balochistan High Court
- In office 20 January 2025 – 1 February 2025

Personal details
- Born: 10 June 1969 (age 57)

Muhammad Asif Reki (born 10 June 1969) is a Pakistani jurist who serves as a judge of the Islamabad High Court (IHC). He was elevated as an additional judge of the Balochistan High Court on 20 January 2025 and was transferred to the IHC on 1 February 2025.

== Career ==
Reki was elevated as an additional judge of the Balochistan High Court on 20 January 2025. He was transferred to the Islamabad High Court (IHC) on 1 February 2025 and sworn in as a permanent judge on 19 January 2026.

== Son's rash driving and manslaughter incident ==
In December 2025, Reki's 16-year-old son, Muhammad Abuzar Reki, was speeding down an Islamabad highway in an unregistered Toyota Land Cruiser with fake license plates, when it ran a red light and collided with two young women of a nearby arts institute, killing one on impact and the other shortly thereafter.

Although he was initially arrested and charged with manslaughter and rash driving, he was granted bail four days later. The swift release followed an out-of-court agreement where the victims' families recorded statements granting him a formal pardon under Pakistan's Qisas and Diyat (blood money) laws. The pardon was widely seen to be secured under pressure, with state officials repeatedly visiting the victims' family members, urging them to accept a settlement. The rapid resolution generated significant public controversy and allegations of institutional pressure and abuse of power.

Later, a misconduct complaint was filed against Justice Reki with the Supreme Judicial Council (SJC), the oversight body for senior judiciary in the country. In June 2026, the SJC dismissed the complaint and concluded the proceedings. No investigation on the facts of the initial manslaughter, or the subsequent alleged pressure on victims' families was ever carried out - instead, the SJC relied on the families' pardon as the basis for dismissing the complaint. Justice Reki continues his service at the Islamabad High Court. His son was never charged.

== See also ==
Abuse of power
