= Watta satta =

Form of exchange marriage prevalent in Afghanistan and Pakistan

Watta satta or Shighar (Punjabi: وٹّا سٹّا, Urdu: شغار) is an exchange marriage common in Pakistan and Afghanistan.

The custom involves the simultaneous marriage of a brother-sister pair from two households. In some cases, it involves uncle–niece pairs, or cousin pairs. Watta satta is more than just an exchange of women from two families or clans; it establishes the shadow of mutual threat across the marriages. A husband who abuses his wife in this arrangement can expect his brother-in-law to retaliate in kind against his sister. Watta satta is cited as a cause of both low domestic violence in some families, and conversely for extreme levels of reciprocal domestic violence in others.

In Pakistan it is typically endogamous, with over 75% marriages involving blood relatives, and 90% of these marriages occurring within the same village, tribe or clan (zaat, biraderi). In rural parts of Pakistan, watta satta accounts for over 30% of all marriages.

== Rationale ==
The rationale for watta satta custom has been theorized as an environment with generally low and uncertain incomes, weak or uncertain legal institutions of the state, where watta satta may be perceived as the most effective means available to the poor to prevent marital discord, divorces and domestic abuse. It enables a form of social pressure and reciprocity, wherein a man who abuses his wife is expected to be deterred by the possibility that his own sister will face similar or more severe retaliation by the brother of his wife. In practice, watta satta may either promote peace in the two families, or (as has also been observed) produce escalating, retaliatory episodes of domestic violence.

Bride exchange between two families is also seen as an informal way to limit demands and consequences of dower (brideprice) and dowry disputes.

== Prevalence ==
In rural parts of northwest and west Pakistan, and its tribal regions, Watta Satta accounts for over 30% of all marriages.

Watta satta is implicitly an endogamous form of marriage. In practice, over 50% of watta satta marriages are within the same village; on a geographical level, over 80% of women either live in the same village of their birth or report being able to visit it and return home in the same day. Over three out of four women in watta satta marriage are married to a blood relative, mostly first-cousins with a preference for the paternal side; of the rest, majority are married to someone unrelated by blood but within the same zaat and biradari (a form of clan in Muslim communities of Pakistan) or clan.

The custom of bartering brides is also observed in Muslim agrarian societies of Afghanistan.

In Islamic communities of Mali, bride exchange between two families has also been observed. It is locally called falen-ni-falen. The practice is prevalent in rural parts of Yemen as well.

== Legal status ==
On May 18, 2026, the Rajasthan High Court, while granting a divorce to a woman who had been exchanged under the system as a minor, remarked in Kiran Bishnoi v. Sunil Kumar case that the practice amounts to “gender coercion, child-rights violation, and familial extortion disguised as custom.” It said that no custom or social practice can override constitutional values, statutory protections or requirement of free consent in marriage. “Continued residence under compulsion of circumstances is not the same thing as voluntary, harmonious cohabitation. A wife staying because she has ‘nowhere else to go’ cannot be treated as proof that no cruelty existed. Endurance is often mistaken for consent and/or condonation,” the court said. Slamming this "mutual hostage-taking between families," it said that "Atta-satta involving a minor is not a benign cultural practice. It commodifies children, suppresses consent, entrenches patriarchy, and breeds future conflict."

== In Islam ==
Shighar is the practice of exchanging brides between two families, where the girl and dowry of one family is exchanged for a girl and dowry from another family. This is prevalent in Saudi Arabia and neighboring countries. This practice is often a means to reduce or evade dowry, and as such is prohibited in Islam, although it is prevalent in Saudi Arabia. The Islamic prophet Muhammad is reported in Sahih Bukhari and Sahih Muslim to have said "There is no Shighar in Islam."

== See also ==
- Baad
- Consanguinity
- Double cousin
- Honour killing in Pakistan
- Inbreeding
- Incest
- Vani (custom)

== Bibliography ==
- Zaman, Muhammad (2011) Exchange Marriages in South Punjab, Pakistan: A Sociological Analysis of Kinship Structure, Agency, and Symbolic Culture. Frankfurt (M)/ Berlin: Peter Lang Publisher
