= Lubor Bárta =

Czech composer (1928–1972)

Lubor Bárta (8 August 1928 – 5 November 1972 in Prague) was a Czech composer.

== Life and career ==
Bárta was born on 8 August 1928 in Lubná. He studied musicology and aesthetics from 1946 to 1948 at Charles University in Prague and was a pupil of Jaroslav Řídký at the Academy of Performing Arts in Prague until 1952. While he was still a student, he composed his first chamber works: Piano Variations, Three Polka Studies, Violin Sonata, Divertimento for Wind Quintet and String Quartet. His early compositions were influenced by Stravinsky and Bartók, but he gradually came into his own compositional style, especially apparent in his instrumental works. From 1952 to 1955 he was an artistic leader of the ensemble Proud. He subsequently lived as a teacher and freelance composer in Prague.

He composed three symphonies, concerti, string quartets, piano pieces, sonatas and other chamber music.

Bárta died on 5 November 1972 in Prague, at the age of 44.

== Selected works ==
Orchestral

- Symphony No.1 (1955)
- Concerto for chamber orchestra (1956)
- Dramatická suita (Dramatic Suite) (1958)
- Z východních Čech (From Eastern Bohemia), Symphonic suite (1960)
- Ludī, Suite for chamber orchestra (1964)

1. Preludium
2. Interludium
3. Ludus nocturnus
4. Ludus diurnus

- Symphony No.2 (1969)
- Musica romantica for string orchestra (1971)
- Symphony No.3 (1972)

Concertante

- Concerto No.1 for violin and orchestra (1952)
- Four Instrumental Solos for piano, violin, cello and flute with orchestral accompaniment (1955)
- Concerto for viola and orchestra (1957)
- Concerto for piano and orchestra (1959)
- Concerto No.2 for violin and orchestra (1969)

Chamber music

- Divertimento for Wind Quintet (1949)
- String Quartet No. 1 (1950)
- Sonata in G Major for violin and piano (1950)
- Sonatina in G Major for violin and piano (1952)
- Trio in C Major for violin, cello and piano (1955)
- Piano Trio in C Major (1955)
- Wind Quintet No.1 (1956)
- String Quartet No.2 (1957)
- Sonata for clarinet and piano (1958)
- Sonatina for trombone and piano (1956)
- Sonata No.2 for violin and piano (1959)
- Balada a burleska (Ballad and Burlesque) for cello and piano (1963)
- Concertino for trombone and piano (1964)
- Čtyři skladby (Four Compositions) for oboe (or clarinet) and piano (1965)
- Sonata for solo guitar (1965)
- Čtyři kusy (Four Pieces) for violin and guitar (1966)
- Sonata for flute and piano (1966)
- String Quartet No.3 (1966)
- Tři kusy (Three Pieces) for cello and piano (1968)
- Wind Quintet No.2 (1969)
- Amoroso for horn and piano (1971)
- Sonata for cello and piano (1971)

Keyboard

- Variations (1948)
- Three Polka Studies (1949)
- Preludium and Toccata (1950)
- Sonata No.1 for piano (1956)
- Sonata No.2 for piano (1961)
- Osm skladeb (Eight Compositions) for piano (1965)
- Osm skladeb pro mladé klavíristy (Eight Compositions for Young Pianists) (1967)
- Sonata for harpsichord (1967)
- Sonata No.3 for piano (1970)

Vocal

- Komsomol, Cantata (1951); 3rd prize winner at the 3rd World Festival of Youth and Students in Berlin
- Zpěv nového věku (Song of the New Age), Cantata for chorus and orchestra (1962); text by Václav Nekvinda
- Tři mužské sbory (Three Male Choruses) (1963); words by Miroslav Florian, Paul Verlaine and František Hrubín
- Čtyři písně pro děti (Four Songs for Children) with piano accompaniment (1965); words by Václav Nekvinda, J. Havel and Zdeněk Kriebel
- Čtyři dětské sbory (Four Children's Choruses) (1965); words by Zdeněk Kriebel
