= Lubná (Svitavy District) =

- Municipality
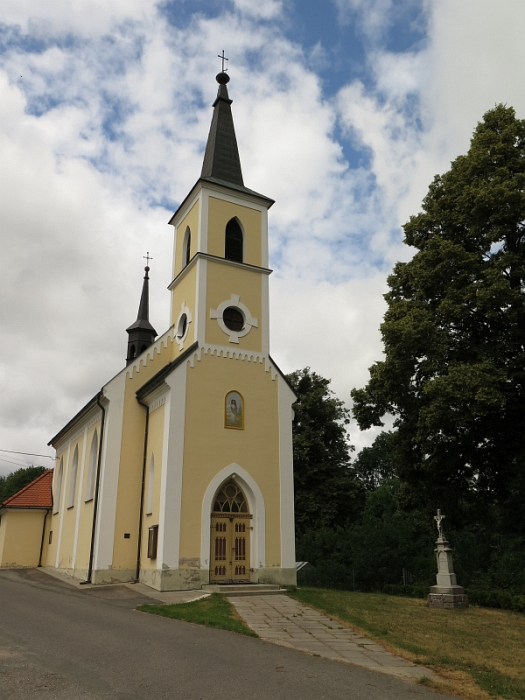
- Chapel of Saint Anne

- Flag Coat of arms

- Location in the Czech Republic
- Coordinates: 49°46′27″N 16°13′25″E
- Country: Czech Republic
- Region: Pardubice
- District: Svitavy
- First mentioned: 1347

Area
  - Total: 19.85 km^{2} (7.66 sq mi)
- Elevation: 495 m (1,624 ft)

Population (2026-01-01)
  - Total: 945
  - Density: 47.6/km^{2} (123/sq mi)
- Time zone: UTC+1 (CET)
  - Summer (DST): UTC+2 (CEST)
- Postal code: 569 63
- Website: www.lubna.cz

Lubná is a municipality and village in Svitavy District in the Pardubice Region of the Czech Republic. It has about 900 inhabitants.

Lubná lies approximately 19 kilometres (12 mi) west of Svitavy, 43 km (27 mi) south-east of Pardubice, and 133 km (83 mi) east of Prague.

== Demographics ==
Historical population
Year	Pop.	±%
1869	1,604	—
1880	1,584	−1.2%
1890	1,493	−5.7%
1900	1,444	−3.3%
1910	1,448	+0.3%
1921	1,429	−1.3%
1930	1,440	+0.8%
1950	1,064	−26.1%
1961	1,077	+1.2%
1970	974	−9.6%
1980	949	−2.6%
1991	953	+0.4%
2001	977	+2.5%
2011	1,007	+3.1%
2021	892	−11.4%
Source: Censuses

== Notable people ==
- Lubor Bárta (1928–1972), composer
