= Athar Minallah =

Pakistani judge (born 1961)

- اطہر من اللہ
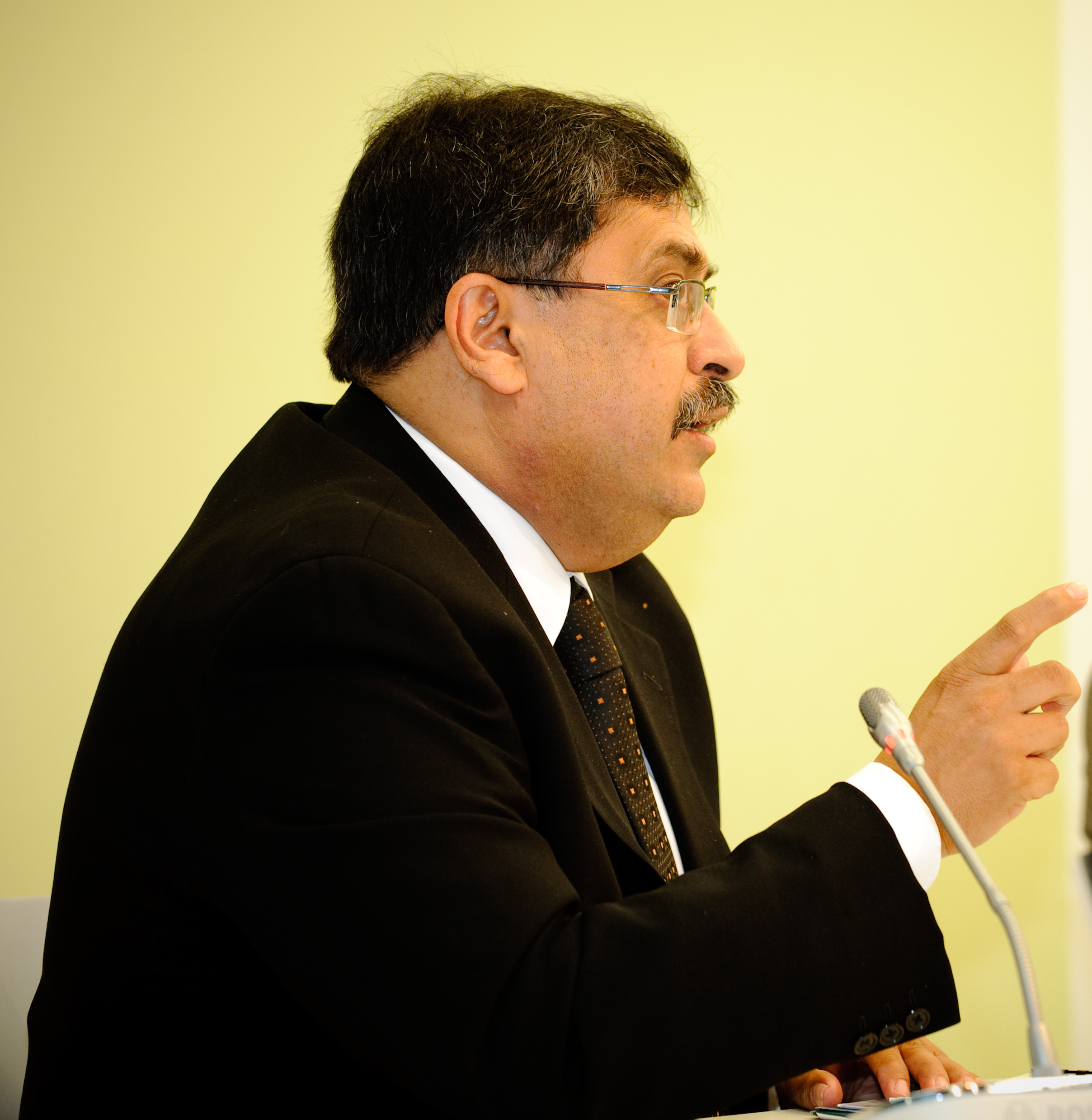
- Athar Minallah in 2009

Justice of the Supreme Court of Pakistan
- In office 11 November 2022 – 13 November 2025
- Nominated by: Judicial Commission of Pakistan
- Appointed by: President of Pakistan

5th Chief Justice of Islamabad High Court
- In office 28 November 2018 – 10 November 2022
- Preceded by: Muhammad Anwar Khan Kasi
- Succeeded by: Aamer Farooq

Justice of Islamabad High Court
- In office 17 June 2014 – 28 November 2018

Personal details
- Born: 30 December 1961 (age 64) Haripur, North-West Frontier Province, Pakistan
- Citizenship: Pakistani
- Relations: Samar Minallah (sister)
- Parent(s): Nasrum Minallah (father); Bilquis Nasrum Minallah (mother)
- Education: University of Cambridge (LLM)

Athar Minallah (Urdu: اطہر من اللہ; born 30 December 1961) is a Pakistani lawyer, and jurist who has served as a judge of Supreme Court of Pakistan from 11 November 2022 to 13 November 2025. Before his appointment to the Supreme Court of Pakistan, he was a judge of the Islamabad High Court for 8 years, and also served as its 5th Chief Justice from 28 November 2018 to 10 November 2022.

Before becoming a judge, he was a lawyer by profession and played an active part in the Lawyers' Movement which was backed by former Prime Minister Nawaz Sharif. He also served as a provincial caretaker minister in the Khyber Pakhtunkhwa during the regime of Musharaf, but later chose to resign.

== Early life and career ==
Athar Minallah was born on 30 December 1961 in Haripur, Khyber Pakhtunkhwa (then North-West Frontier Province) to Bilquis Nasrum Minallah, and Nasrum Minallah.

His father Nasrum Minallah was a senior civil servant, who served as the Chief Secretary of Balochistan from October 1976 to July 1977, and was removed soon after the imposition of the 1977 Martial Law because of his opposition to Pakistan Army's role in the matters of provincial government. His mother Bilquis Nasrum Minallah served as a member of National Assembly of Pakistan from 1985 to 1988.

Minallah obtained his early education from his hometown, Haripur. He has a Master of Laws from University of Cambridge. After getting his masters, he initially joined the Civil Services, and worked in the Custom Department. However, he soon resigned, and joined the legal profession.

In 2002 he took charge as the Minister of Law, Parliamentary Affairs and Human Rights, Local Government, and Rural Development in the then NWFP Provincial Government of Governor Lt. General Syed Iftikhar Hussain Shah which was formed under the Governor's Rule following the 1999 Pakistani coup d'état.

Minallah was amongst the early supporters of Military Dictator General Pervez Musharraf but in 2007, following the sacking of the then Chief Justice of Pakistan, Iftikhar Muhammad Chaudhry by Musharraf, he joined the Lawyers' Movement for the restoration of the judiciary, and became one of the faces of the movement.

However, after Justice Chaudhry's restoration, he became a critic of the judiciary because of excessive suo motu cases which led to the pendency of routine cases.

=== Appointment to Islamabad High Court ===
He was third on the seniority list in the Islamabad High Court till the sacking of Justice Shaukat Aziz Siddiqui, the former senior puisne judge who was removed on the recommendation of Supreme Judicial Council that found him guilty of misconduct over claims of manipulation of judicial proceedings against the Inter-Services Intelligence, Pakistan's intelligence agency. Subsequently, Justice Minallah became the senior puisne judge.

He became the 5th Chief Justice of Islamabad High Court on 28 November 2018, following the retirement of Justice Muhammad Anwar Khan Kasi.

=== Elevation to Supreme Court of Pakistan ===
The appointment of Justice Athar Minallah to the Supreme Court was approved by the Judicial Commission of Pakistan (JCP) on 24 October 2022. He took oath as a Judge of the Supreme Court of Pakistan on 11 November 2022.

Through his judicial note which was released to the public on 7 April 2023, he criticised the Chief Justice of Pakistan Justice Umar Ata Bandial. He contended that the court should not involve itself in politically motivated cases, as when it does so, it looks as it is furthering the political interests of a select group. He further stated that in political cases one side loses and the other side wins, but the Court in all circumstances is the loser.

During his service as a Supreme Court Justice in 2024, him and the Supreme Court bench faced multiple cases involving the Pakistan Tehreek-e-Insaf (PTI) regarding the 2024 Pakistani general election, as part of these cases Minallah has criticised the Election Commission of Pakistan (ECP) for removing PTI's electoral bat symbol and for not giving PTI reserved seats as part of the SIC reserved seats case. He has also urged other judges to not take any external influence to avoid meddling in judicial matters.

On 13 November 2025, Minallah resigned from the Supreme Court in protest over the passage of the 27th constitutional amendment. He wrote, "The constitution that I swore an oath to uphold and defend is no more. What is left is a mere shadow, one that breathes neither its spirit, nor speaks the words of the people to whom it belongs."

== Personal life ==
He is married to Ghazala Safdar, daughter of Ghulam Safdar Shah, a former Justice of the Supreme Court of Pakistan, who was 1 of 3 dissenting judges of the 7 member Supreme Court of Pakistan bench that upheld the Lahore High Court conviction of former Prime Minister Zulfikar Ali Bhutto, and was hounded out of Pakistan by the then military dictator, General Muhammad Zia-ul-Haq.

== See also ==
- Supreme Court of Pakistan
