= Lubna Nasir =

British veterinary oncologist

- Born: Bradford, England

Academic background
- Education: University of Liverpool (BSc) University of Glasgow (MSc) University of Glasgow (PhD)

Academic work
- Discipline: Veterinary medicine
- Sub-discipline: Comparative oncology, bovine papillomavirus, molecular biology, gene therapy
- Institutions: University of Glasgow

Lubna Nasir is a veterinary oncologist, academic, and educator. She is the professor of comparative oncology at the School of Biodiversity, One Health and Veterinary Medicine, College of Medicine, Life and Veterinary Sciences (MLVS), University of Glasgow. Her research focuses on "molecular mechanisms that promote immortalisation and transformation of animal cells as well as the identification of novel targets for therapeutic cancer intervention". She also studies Bovine Papillomaviruses (BPV) in the pathogenesis of equine sarcoid skin tumours; BPV is primarily associated with the BPV-1/2 infection with sarcoids representing the first known natural cross species papillomaviral infection.

== Early life and education ==
Nasir was born to Pakistani-Muslim parents who immigrated to the United Kingdom after being recruited to join the National Health Service (NHS) in the 1960s. She grew up in Bradford, England, surrounded predominantly by white families during the 1970s and 1980s–a period marked by growing racial tensions in country.

In 1988, Nasir graduated from the University of Liverpool with a Bachelor of Science degree in genetics. Her longstanding association with University of Glasgow began in the early 1990s when she enrolled in their graduate programme to study medical genetics. In 1993, she received a doctorate in molecular biology, and started working as a postdoctoral researcher to better understand the genetics and molecular biology of tumours in horses. She served as the senior lecturer of veterinary biosciences for six years starting in 2005, and was appointed as a personal chair in 2010.

== Career ==
Between 2005 and 2008, Nasir received a grant from Dog Trust, United Kingdom to study novel systems delivering targeted gene therapy for the treatment of canine cancers, as part of which her research team suggested a two-step transcriptional activation system that targets epithelial cells. She has also received grants from Wellcome Trust, Medical Research Council, Horserace Betting Levy Board, The Horse Trust, Natural Environment Research Council,Petplan Charitable Trust and Morris Animal Foundation while working with the University of Glasgow.

Nasir has been involved in the diversity, equity, and inclusion (DEI) activities at the University of Glasgow for almost a decade. She is the director of DEI at the School of Biodiversity, One Health and Veterinary Medicine, and led the School's Athena SWAN charter award that recognizes "commitment and progress towards gender equality in higher education". In 2024, she received the Outstanding Contribution to Diversity and Inclusion in the Workplace Award by the Scottish Association of Minority Ethnic Educators (SAMEE).

Following several years of research, comprising grant acquisition, publications and PhD supervision, Nasir's interests have moved towards learning and teaching with her current primary focus being course design, development and evaluation in veterinary medicine and biosciences.

== Personal life ==
Nasir has two daughters.

== Selected publications ==
=== Journal articles ===
- Terron-Canedo, N.; Weir, W.; Nicolson, L.; Britton, C.; Nasir, L. (2017). "Differential expression of microRNAs in bovine papillomavirus type 1 transformed equine cells". Veterinary and Comparative Oncology. 15 (3): 764–774. doi:10.1111/vco.12216. PMID 27039895.
- Abel-Reichwald, Hans; Hainisch, Edmund K.; Zahalka, Sophie; Corteggio, Annunziata; Borzacchiello, Giuseppe; Massa, Barbara; Merlone, Luca; Nasir, Lubna; Burden, Faith; Brandt, Sabine (2016-11-30). "Epidemiologic analysis of a sarcoid outbreak involving 12 of 111 donkeys in Northern Italy". Veterinary Microbiology. 196: 85–92. doi:10.1016/j.vetmic.2016.10.021. PMID 27939161.
- Staiger, Elizabeth A.; Tseng, Chia T.; Miller, Donald; Cassano, Jennifer M.; Nasir, Lubna; Garrick, Dorian; Brooks, Samantha A.; Antczak, Douglas F. (2016-08-15). "Host genetic influence on papillomavirus-induced tumors in the horse". International Journal of Cancer. 139 (4): 784–792. doi:10.1002/ijc.30120. PMID 27037728.
- Stocco, Rita de Cassia; Roperto, Franco Peppino; Nasir, Lubna; Sircili, Marcelo Palma (2014). "Oncogenic Processes". BioMed Research International. 2014: 1–4. doi:10.1155/2014/879013. PMC 3914301. PMID 24551854.
- Nasir, Lubna; Brandt, Sabine (2013-11-29). "Papillomavirus associated diseases of the horse". Veterinary Microbiology. 167 (1–2): 159–167. doi:10.1016/j.vetmic.2013.08.003. PMID 24016387.
