= Arbab Muhammad Tahir =

Pakistani jurist

Justice of the Islamabad High Court
- Incumbent
- Assumed office 17 December 2021

Islamabad

Arbab Muhammad Tahir is a Pakistani jurist who has been a Justice of the Islamabad High Court, since 17 December 2021.

== Biography ==
In November 2021, Tahir was recommended by the Judicial Commission of Pakistan (JCP) for appointment as a judge of the Islamabad High Court (IHC). He had previously served as the Advocate General of Balochistan before being appointed to the IHC on 17 December 2021.

== Controversies ==
=== Allegations of harassment by intelligence agencies ===
On 26 March 2024, six judges of the Islamabad High Court, including Tahir, wrote a letter to the Supreme Judicial Council of Pakistan, alleging interference by the Inter-Services Intelligence in judicial matters. They cited instances of pressure on judges through the abduction and torture of their relatives and secret surveillance within their residences. Additionally, they questioned the existence of a state policy aimed at intimidating and coercing judges. Subsequently, the next day, Chief Justice of Pakistan (CJP) Qazi Faez Isa convened a full court session to investigate the accusations raised by the judges.
