= Samar Minallah =

Pakistani anthropologist, activist and filmmaker

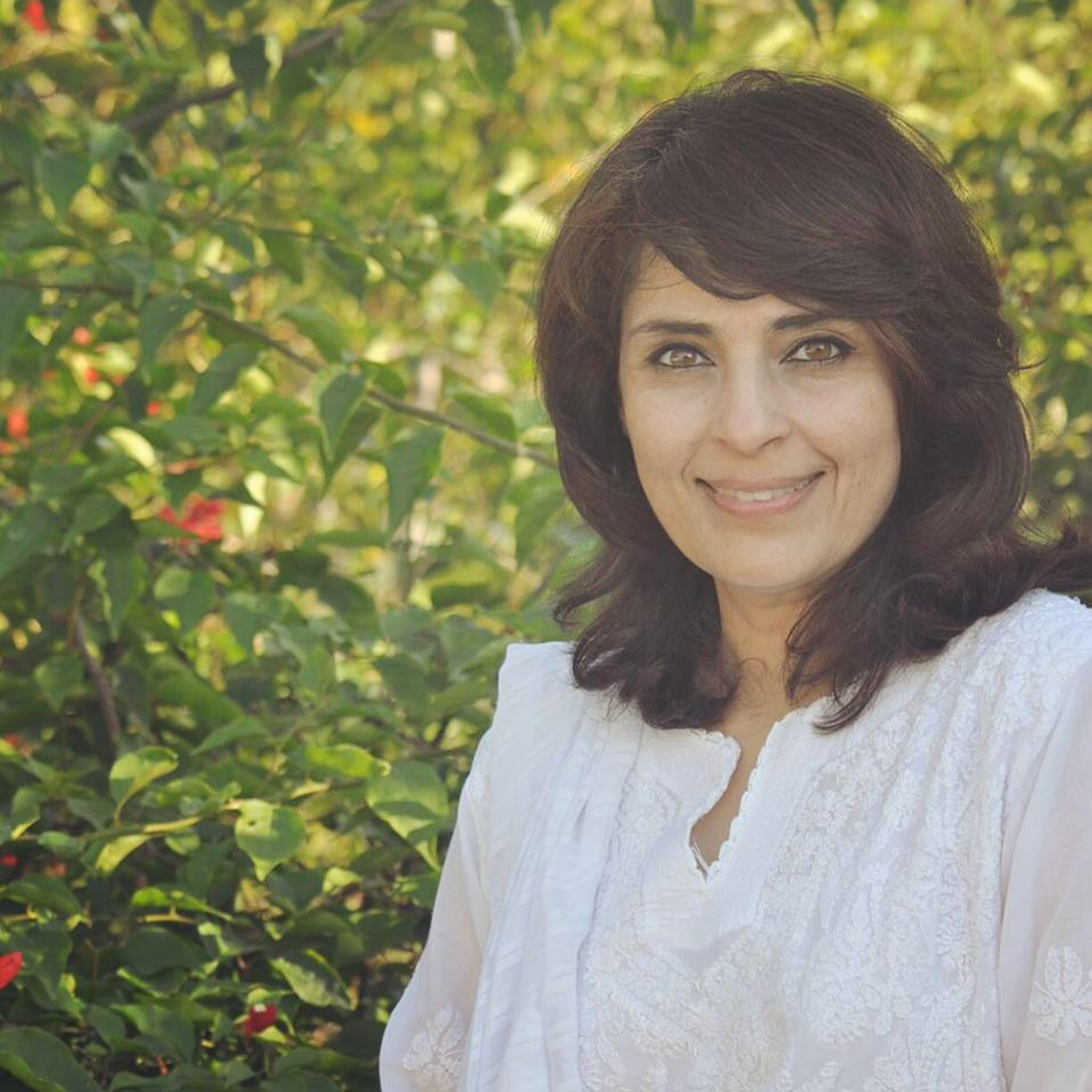
- Samar Minallah Khan
- Born: 1970 (age 55–56); Peshawar, Pakistan
- Education: University of Cambridge (MPhil)
- Occupations: Anthropologist, documentary filmmaker, and human rights activist

Samar Minallah Khan (ALA-LC: S̱amar min Allāh IPA: [ˈsəmər mɪn əlˈlɑːh]) is a Pakistani anthropologist, activist, and documentary filmmaker. She is known for her work documenting cultural practices that affect women and children, particularly within Pashtun communities in Pakistan. Her films address topics including compensation marriage, honor crimes, and child marriage.

== Early life and education ==
Samar Minallah Khan was born in Peshawar, Khyber Pakhtunkhwa, Pakistan to Bilquis Nasrum Minallah, a social activist, and Nasrum Minallah, a civil servant who served as the Chief Secretary of Balochistan from October 1976 to July 1977.

She received a degree in anthropology from Quaid-i-Azam University in Islamabad and an M.Phil. in anthropology from the University of Cambridge.

== Career ==
After starting her career as a journalist, Minallah transitioned to documentary filmmaking.

In 2003, she released her first film, Swara – A Bridge over Troubled Waters. The documentary examined the tradition of swara, or compensation marriage, where girls are given in marriage to settle disputes. The film was submitted as evidence in a 2004 Supreme Court of Pakistan case concerning the practice. In the same year, the government of Pakistan criminalized swara through an amendment to the Pakistan Penal Code (Section 310-A).

In 2005, Minallah released Dar-Pa-Dar: Where the Heart Lies, a documentary about Afghan refugees in Pakistan. The film recorded the living conditions and personal accounts of displaced Afghans who had resided in Pakistan for decades. In 2008, she produced Bajaur Gooloona: Homeless at Home, which documented the circumstances of people displaced from the Bajaur Agency due to military operations against militants.

In 2011, amid threats to girls' schools by militants, she directed Allaho – A Lullaby for You My Daughter, a Pashto/Dari music video featuring the famed singer Naghma to address the cultural preference for sons by celebrating the birth of daughters. In the same year, Minallah released Kuch Khaab Hain Meray (I Have a Dream), a 35-minute documentary about child domestic workers. It documented the conditions of children in domestic labor and was used in advocacy campaigns for increased legal protections for underage workers.

Minallah's 2012 film Poles Apart: Chains Do Not Keep Marriages Together turned its focus to forced marriages in both Pakistan and the diaspora. Filmed in Punjab and among the Pakistani community in Norway, this 32-minute documentary followed several individuals who managed to escape involuntary marriages and rebuild their lives. Her 2012 film, The Dark Side of Migration, examined the practice of "contract marriages" where Pakistani families, particularly in the Gujrat District district, arrange marriages for their daughters with citizens of European countries for financial or migratory benefits.

She also produced Bibi Shireenay: Where Honor Comes From, another music video that portrayed Pashtun men celebrating and supporting the women in their families as a means to redefine concepts of honor within the culture.

In 2021, she released the documentary OutSwing, which follows an all-girls cricket team in an Islamabad slum. Prize winnings from the film's festival circuit appearances were donated to the school attended by the girls featured in the documentary. The film was named Best Film in the documentary-short competition at the Nordic International Film Festival and won Best Short Film at the 7th Sport Film Festival Rotterdam. It also received the Humanitarian Award from the LifeArt Film Festival. At the 7th SOFIE Short Film Awards, it was recognized with awards for Best Documentary Short Film and Best Director (Documentary). Additional accolades included the SDGs Award at the Sapporo International Short Film Festival and Market, as well as both the Ron Kovic Peace Prize and the Eva Haller Women Transforming Media Award from the MY HERO International Film Festival. The film also received the Jury Prize for Empowerment at the UN Women USA Global Voices Film Festival, Best Documentary Film at the Mosaic International South Asian Film Festival, Best Short Documentary at the DESIblitz Film Fusion Festival, and Best Sports Film at the Toronto Women Film Festival.

== Advocacy and truck art ==
In addition to film, Minallah uses other media for advocacy. In the late 2010s, she initiated a truck art project in collaboration with Pakistan's Ministry of Human Rights. The project involved painting trucks with images and slogans promoting girls' education, serving as mobile information carriers in remote regions. One slogan used was "Mujhe sona chandi nahin, kitab aur qalam do" ("Don't give me silver or gold, give me a book and pen").

In 2019, Minallah launched the Truck Art ChildFinder campaign which involved replacing traditional decorative portraits on transport trucks with images of missing children and a helpline number. The campaign was credited with the recovery of several children and received two Silver and two Bronze Lions at the Cannes Lions International Festival of Creativity, a Clio Award, a D&AD Wood Pencil, and the Grand Effie for Pakistan in 2020. In 2021, Khan received a Commonwealth Innovation Award "for turning folk art into a vehicle for child-protection advocacy."

In 2021, Minallah initiated the Truck Art for Girls' Right to Play campaign to promote gender equality in sports. The project involved painting portraits of female athletes and related slogans on cargo trucks. It was shortlisted for the Sport for Equality prize at the Beyond Sport Global Awards.

== Personal life ==
Samar Minallah is married to a civil servant, and they have two children.

== Awards and recognition ==
- 2010: Perdita Huston Human Rights Award
- 2010: Women Have Wings Courage Award
- 2012: Fern Holland Award from Vital Voices
- 2015: Vital Voices Global Leadership Award
- 2021: Eva Haller Women Transforming Media Award
