= Sardar Ejaz Ishaq Khan =

Pakistani jurist

Justice of the Islamabad High Court
- Incumbent
- Assumed office 17 December 2021

Personal details
- Born: 19 July 1968 (age 58)
- Education: University of Oxford; University of the Punjab

Islamabad

Sardar Ejaz Ishaq Khan is a Pakistani jurist who has been a Justice of the Islamabad High Court since 17 December 2021.

== Biography ==
Khan completed his BA Hons (Juris) from the University of Oxford. He also holds a Barrister degree from Lincoln's Inn, England, and is an alum of the University of the Punjab.

He became an advocate of the Lahore High Court in 1994.

In November 2021, Khan was recommended by the Judicial Commission of Pakistan (JCP) for appointment as a judge of the Islamabad High Court (IHC).

On 17 December 2021, he was appointed as a Judge of the Islamabad High Court.

== Controversies ==
=== Allegations of harassment by intelligence agencies ===
On 26 March 2024, six judges of the Islamabad High Court, including Khan, wrote a letter to the Supreme Judicial Council of Pakistan, alleging interference by the Inter-Services Intelligence in judicial matters. They cited instances of pressure on judges through the abduction and torture of their relatives and secret surveillance within their residences. Additionally, they questioned the existence of a state policy aimed at intimidating and coercing judges. Subsequently, the next day, Chief Justice of Pakistan (CJP) Qazi Faez Isa convened a full court session to investigate the accusations raised by the judges.
