= Lubná (Kroměříž District) =

- Municipality
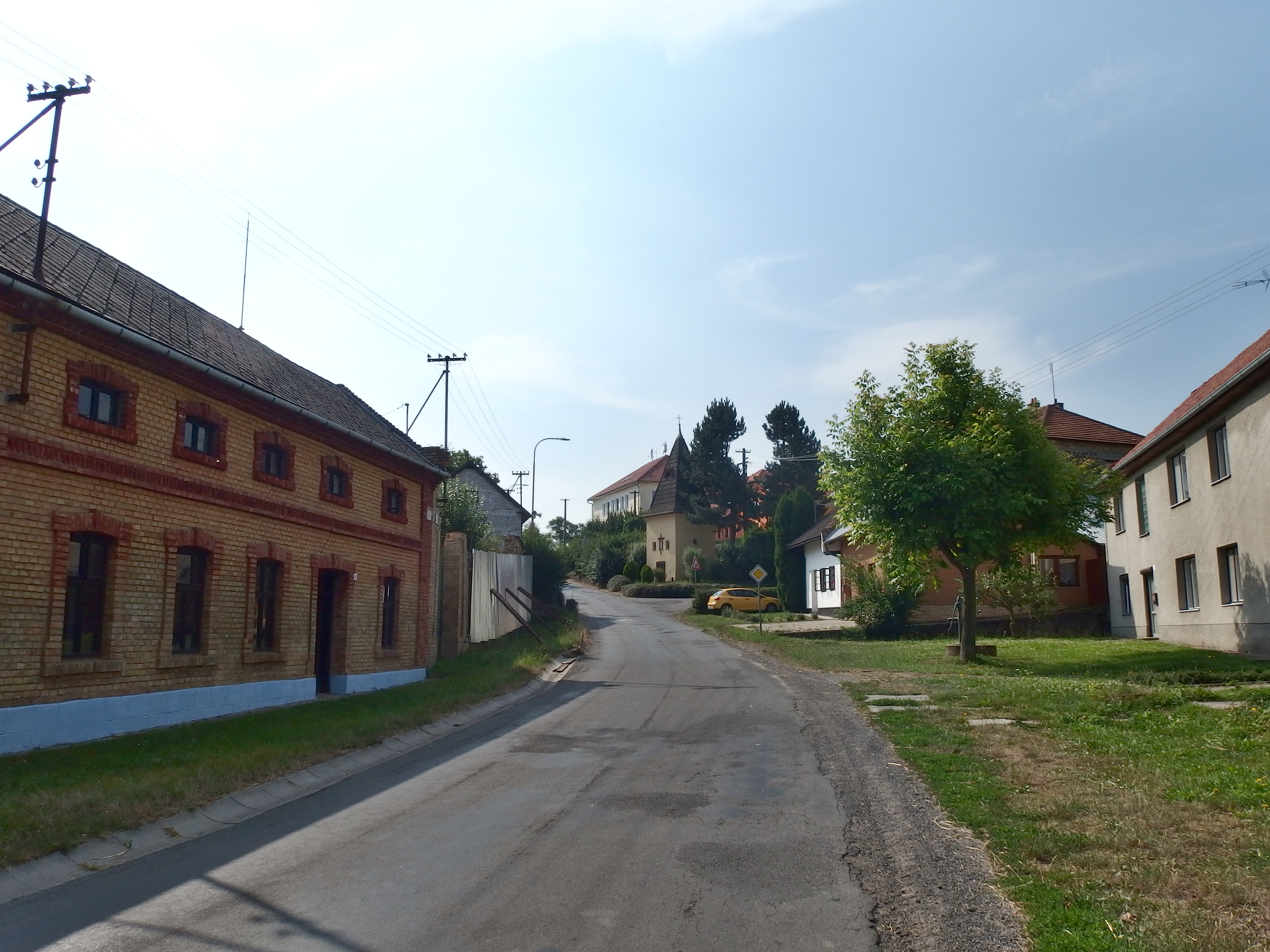
- Centre of Lubná

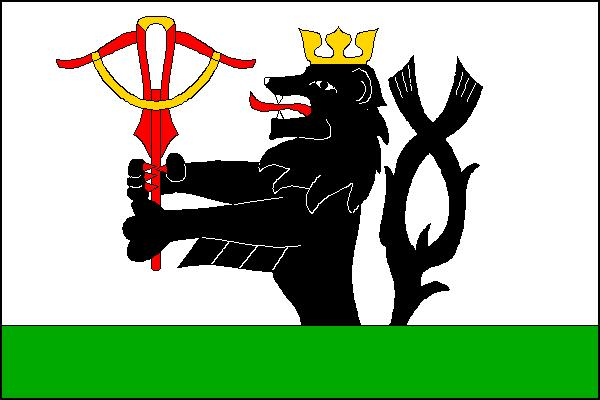
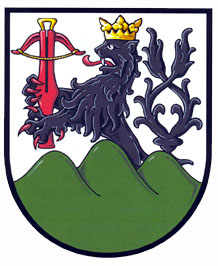
- Flag Coat of arms

- Location in the Czech Republic
- Coordinates: 49°13′15″N 17°23′53″E
- Country: Czech Republic
- Region: Zlín
- District: Kroměříž
- First mentioned: 1141

Area
  - Total: 6.76 km^{2} (2.61 sq mi)
- Elevation: 245 m (804 ft)

Population (2026-01-01)
  - Total: 476
  - Density: 70.4/km^{2} (182/sq mi)
- Time zone: UTC+1 (CET)
  - Summer (DST): UTC+2 (CEST)
- Postal code: 767 01
- Website: obeclubna.cz

Lubná is a municipality and village in Kroměříž District in the Zlín Region of the Czech Republic. It has about 500 inhabitants.

Lubná lies approximately 10 kilometres (6 mi) south of Kroměříž, 20 km (12 mi) west of Zlín, and 236 km (147 mi) south-east of Prague.

== Demographics ==
Historical population
Year	Pop.	±%
1869	660	—
1880	717	+8.6%
1890	773	+7.8%
1900	770	−0.4%
1910	784	+1.8%
1921	767	−2.2%
1930	694	−9.5%
1950	669	−3.6%
1961	605	−9.6%
1970	562	−7.1%
1980	467	−16.9%
1991	431	−7.7%
2001	432	+0.2%
2011	460	+6.5%
2021	455	−1.1%
Source: Censuses
