= Aamer Farooq =

Pakistani jurist

Justice of Supreme Court of Pakistan
- In office 14 February 2025 – 14 November 2025

Chief Justice of Islamabad High Court
- In office 11 November 2022 – 11 February 2025
- Nominated by: Judicial Commission of Pakistan
- Appointed by: President of Pakistan
- Preceded by: Athar Minallah
- Succeeded by: Sardar Muhammad Sarfraz Dogar

Senior Justice of the Islamabad High Court
- In office 28 November 2018 – 10 November 2022
- Preceded by: Athar Minallah

Justice of the Islamabad High Court
- In office 31 December 2014 – 11 February 2025

Personal details
- Born: 26 April 1969 (age 57)

Aamer Farooq (born 26 April 1969) is a Pakistani jurist who served as the Chief Justice of Islamabad High Court from 11 November 2022 till 11 February 2025 and also served as the Justice of the Islamabad High Court from 31 December 2014 to 10 November 2022. He currently serves as a Justice of Supreme Court of Pakistan He is judge of Federal Constitutional Court of Pakistan since 14 November 2025.

== Early life and education ==
Aamer received his Senior Cambridge diploma from St. Anthony's High School in Lahore in 1986 and his higher senior cambridge diploma from Aitchison College in 1988. In 1993, he graduated from Lincoln's Inn Law School in London with an LLB degree from London University in the United Kingdom.

== Judicial career ==
Farooq started his practice in Lahore and also has an office in Islamabad. He focuses on civil, commercial, tax, and banking law. He served as adjunct faculty at Lahore University of Management Sciences from 2009 until his promotion in Lahore High Court. Aamer took his oath on January 1, 2015, and on December 23, 2015, he was confirmed as a judge of the Islamabad High Court.

=== Named in Rana Shamim affidavit controversy ===
The former top Gilgit Baltistan judge, Rana Shamim gave the statement under oath before the Oath Commissioner on November 10, 2021. The affidavit was duly notarized by Notary Public Charles Drostan Guthrie, which is located in Golden Cross House, 8 Duncannon Street, London. According to Rana Shamim, former chief justice Saqib Nisar had directed IHC judge Aamer Farooq not to release Nawaz Sharif and Maryam Nawaz till the 2018 general elections.

=== Chief Justice of the Islamabad High Court ===
On 1 November 2022, the Judicial Commission of Pakistan (JCP) suggested that Justice Aamer be named Chief Justice of the Islamabad High Court. President Alvi approved Justice Aamer Farooq’s appointment as the IHC chief justice after the recommendations of parliamentary committee for judges appointment. The committee had on November 4 approved the Judicial Commission of Pakistan’s recommendations for the promotion of Justice Athar Minallah to the SC and Justice Farooq as the IHC chief justice, respectively.

=== Justice of Supreme Court of Pakistan ===
He was elevated on 11 February 2025 as a Justice of the Supreme Court of Pakistan.
