= Beyond Sport =

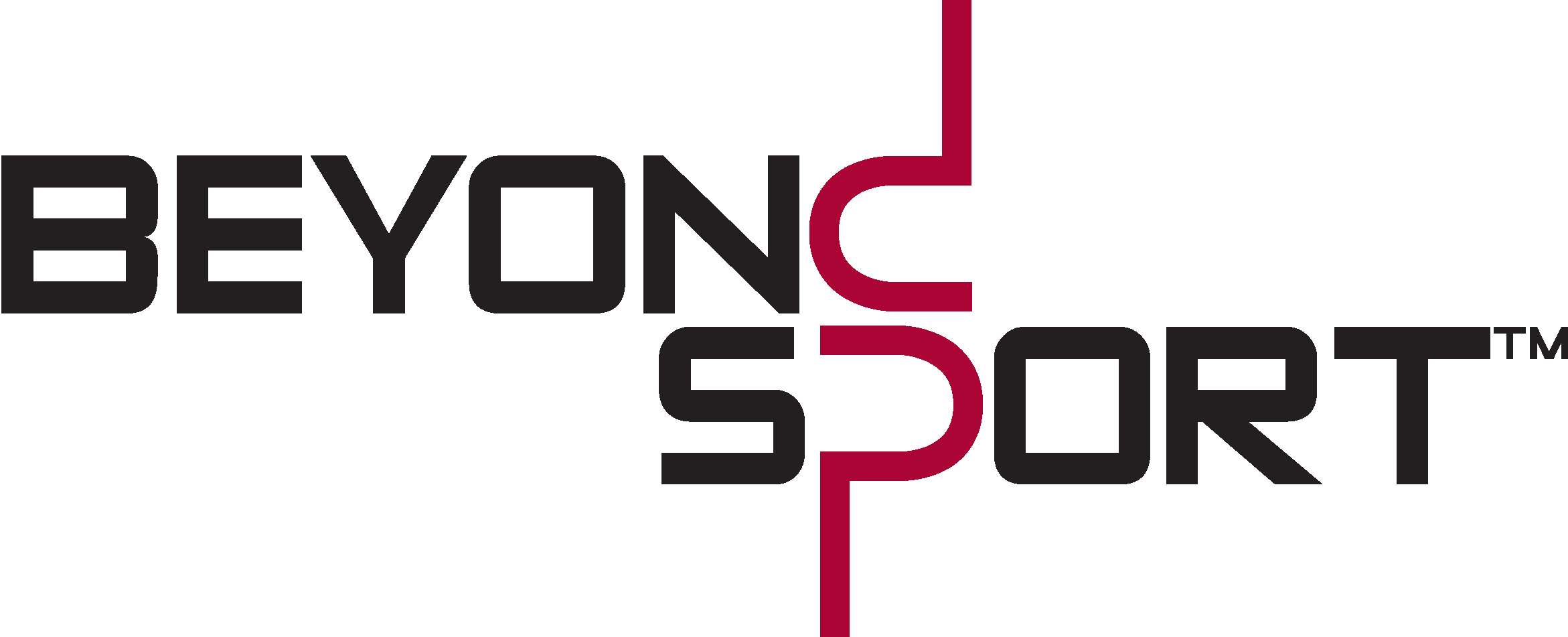
Beyond Sport logo

Beyond Sport is a UK-registered global foundation, having the role of promoting sustainable social change through sports. Over the past 14 years, the Foundation has given out grants totaling $6.7 million and supported over 490 projects in 150 countries. Its support has gone to a diverse range of organizations and individuals using sports ranging from yoga to martial arts to football to tackle social issues head-on. It works in partnership with other organizations including NBA, ESPN, Comic Relief, Sport England, The North Face, Unilever, MLB, MLS, NHL, and UK Sport. It has a global Board of Directors and a Youth Advisory Board.

== Board members ==
Board of directors:

- Jean Afterman, Senior Vice President and Assistant General Manager, The New York Yankees

- David Becker, International Sports and Entertainment Lawyer

- Alexandra (Lex) Chalat, Executive Director, Partnerships and Strategic Alignment - Qatar Foundation

- John Gleasure, Non-Executive Director

- Nick Keller, Founder and Chair, Beyond Sport

- Kely Nascimento, Founder and CEO, The Impact Game;Documentary filmmaker

- Melissa Potter, Executive Director, Content for Change and Vice President, Strategy and Impact - Paramount

- Cameron Rogers, Private Wealth Advisor, Ellevest

- Ambassador A. Shabazz, Diplomat, Lecturer, Consultant and Professor

Youth Advisory Board:

- Siham Abdullahi, UK

- Carolina Agurcia, Honduras

- Tyrel Butler, Trinidad

- Nuth Chork, Cambodia

- Andrea Golli, US

- Laiba Masoud, Pakistan

- Daniel Ocenar, Philippines

- Ferdnand Wakalile, Uganda
