= Islamabad High Court =

Senior court of the Islamabad Capital Territory

- عدالتِ عالیہ اسلام آباد
- Established: 2010 (16 years ago)
- Jurisdiction: Islamabad Capital Territory
- Location: Constitution Avenue, Sector G-5/1, Islamabad
- Composition method: Presidential appointment on Judicial Commission recommendation
- Authorised by: Constitution of Pakistan
- Appeals to: Supreme Court of Pakistan
- Appeals from: Islamabad District Courts
- Judge term length: Until 62 years of age
- Number of positions: 13
- Website: ihc.gov.pk

Chief Justice of Islamabad High Court
- Currently: Sardar Muhammad Sarfraz Dogar
- Since: 14 February 2025

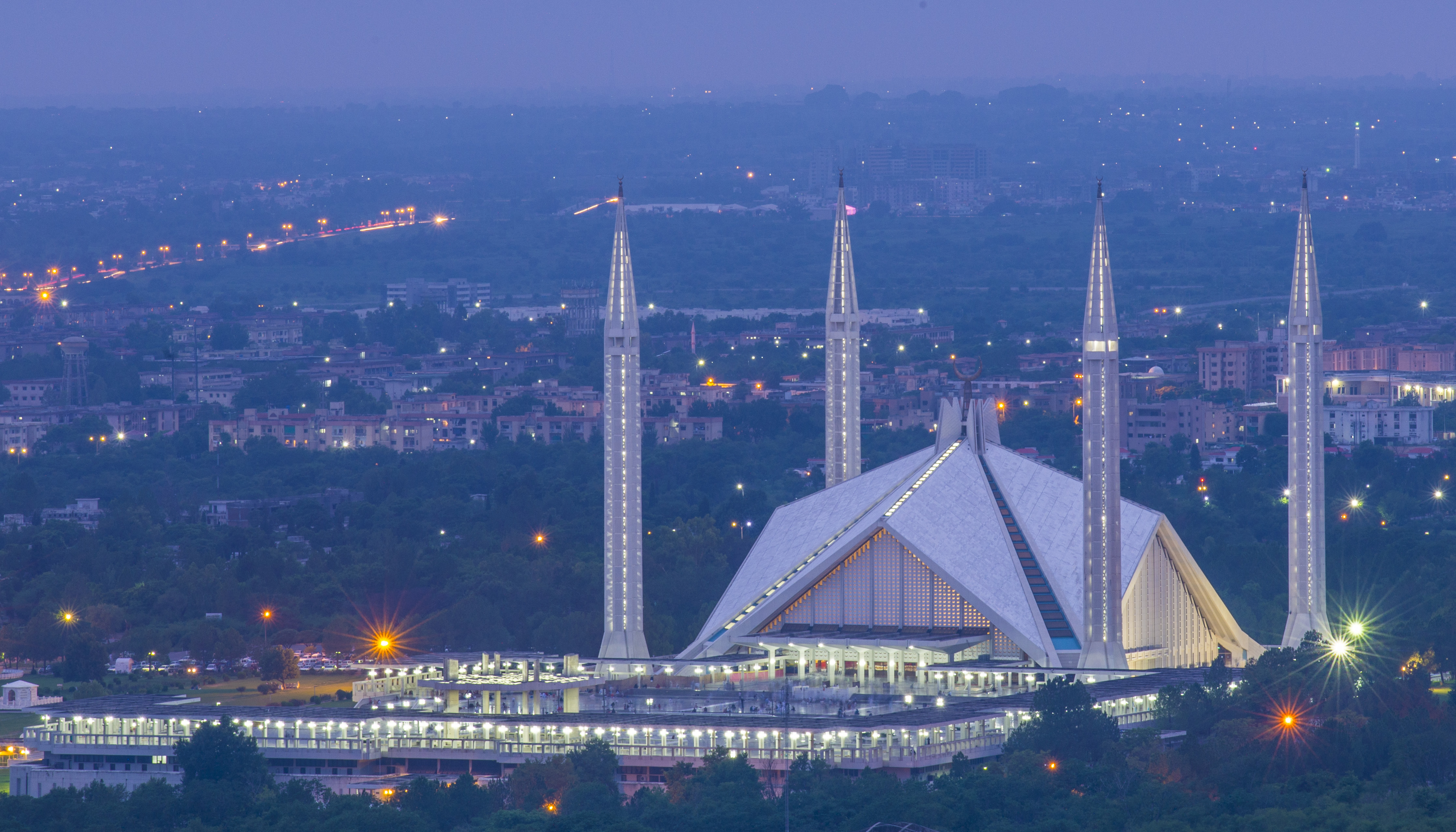
Islamabad

The Islamabad High Court (IHC) is the senior court of the Islamabad Capital Territory, Pakistan, with appellate jurisdiction over the following district courts:

- Islamabad District Court (East)
- Islamabad District Court (West)

Justice Sardar Muhammad Sarfraz Dogar is the current Chief Justice, having taken oath on 8 July 2025.

== History ==
The Court was originally established on 14 August 2007 by Presidential Order of Pervez Musharraf, the military ruler at the time. The Court ceased to exist on 31 July 2009 by a decision of the Supreme Court of Pakistan following Constitution Petition No. 09 and 08 of 2009.

The Court was re-established under the Islamabad High Court Act, 2010 following the 18th Amendment to the Constitution of Pakistan. President Asif Ali Zardari administered the oath to the first Chief Justice, Iqbal Hameed ur Rahman on 3 January 2011 at the Governor's House, Karachi.

In a 116-page judgment released on 24 February 2026, the IHC detailed the removal of Tariq Mehmood Jahangiri in his appointment to the bench. An IHC division bench made up of Chief Justice Sardar Muhammad Sarfraz Dogar and Justice Muhammad Azam Khan ruled ex-Jahangiri's elevation to the high court was a "legal nullity" since his foundational law degree was void ab initio.

== Current composition ==
The Islamabad High Court is headed by a Chief Justice. After the passing of Islamabad High Court (Amendment) Act 2024, the court will consist of 12 judges, in addition to the Chief Justice. The mandatory retirement age of the Chief Justice and Justices is 62 years. The Additional Judges are initially appointed for one year. After that, their services could either be extended or they may be confirmed or retired. The current composition of the High Court is as follows:

No.	Name	Appointed	Retirement Date	Appointed From	Comments
1	Sardar Muhammad Sarfraz Dogar	8 June 2015	2 July 2030	Punjab	Chief Justice since 14 February 2025. Transferred from LHC on 1 February 2025.
2	Sardar Ejaz Ishaq Khan	17 December 2021	18 July 2030	Islamabad	Senior Puisne Judge since 29 April 2026
3	Arbab Muhammad Tahir	17 December 2021	6 September 2029	Balochistan	
4	Khadim Hussain Soomro	14 April 2023	11 September 2037	Sindh	Transferred from SHC on 1 February 2025
5	Muhammad Azam Khan	20 January 2025	22 April 2030	Khyber Pakhtunkhwa	
6	Muhammad Asif Reki	20 January 2025	9 June 2031	Balochistan	Transferred from BHC on 1 February 2025
7	Inaam Ameen Minhas	20 January 2025	10 January 2032		
8	Ayyaz Shaukat	11 August 2026			Additional Judge, subject to confirmation
9	Umair Majeed Malik	11 August 2026			Additional Judge, subject to confirmation
10	Shahrukh Arjumand	11 August 2026	20 December 2040		Additional Judge, subject to confirmation
11	Vacant				
12	Vacant				
13	Vacant				

== List of former chief justices ==
No.	Name	Date of appointment
1	Sardar Muhammad Aslam	9 February 2008-March 2009
2	M. Bilal Khan	9 March 2009-July 2009
3	Iqbal Hameed Ur Rahman	3 January 2011-February 2013
4	Muhammad Anwar Khan Kasi	24 February 2013-November 2018
5	Athar Minallah	28 November 2018-November 2022
6	Aamer Farooq	11 November 2022-February 2025

== Registrar ==
Sardar Tahir Sabir, Judge is appointed as Registrar Islamabad High Court on 30 September 2022.

== See also ==
- Islamabad District Court
- Judiciary of Pakistan
- Islamabad Bar Council
