= Swift (surname) =

Swift is an English surname.

== People ==
Notable people with the surname include:

=== A ===
- A. Ervine Swift (1915–2003), American Episcopalian bishop
- Adam Swift (born 1961), British political philosopher and sociologist
- Adam Swift (rugby league) (born 1993), English rugby league footballer
- Al Swift (1935–2018), American broadcaster and politician
- Alf Swift (1871–1953), Australian rules footballer
- Alfred Swift (1931–2009), South African cyclist
- Allen Swift (1924–2010), American voice actor, writer and magician
- Andrew Swift (disambiguation), several people
- Arthur Swift (1810–1855), American merchant, surveyor, politician and soldier
- Arthur Swift (footballer) (1892–1954), English footballer and football coach
- Austin Swift (born 1992), American actor, music executive and producer

=== B ===
- Barry Swift (born 1976), Trinidadian and Tobagonian former association footballer
- Ben Swift (born 1987), British racing cyclist
- Benjamin Swift (1780–1847), American banker, lawyer and politician
- Benjamin Swift, pen name of William Romaine Paterson (1871–1941), Scottish writer
- Bill Swift (born 1961), American baseball player
- Bill Swift (1930s pitcher) (1908–1969), American baseball player
- Brian Swift (disambiguation), several people

=== C ===
- Caroline Swift (born 1955), British barrister and former High Court judge
- Carleton B. Swift Jr. (1919–2012), U.S Navy, Office of Strategic Services and CIA officer
- Carter Swift (born 1998), New Zealand swimmer
- Charles Swift (born 1961), American attorney and former Navy officer
- Charles Swift (disambiguation), several people
- Claire Swift (born 1974), American politician
- Clement Nye Swift (1846–1918), American painter
- Clive Swift (1936–2019), British actor
- Colette Swift (born 1973), Irish former road cyclist
- Connor Swift (born 1995), British racing cyclist

=== D ===
- D'Andre Swift (born 1999), American football player
- David Swift (disambiguation)
- Daystar Swift (born 1991), Trinidadian and Tobagonian netball international player
- Deborah Swift (born 1955), English writer and historical novelist
- Doug Swift (born 1948), American former football player
- Duncan Swift (1943–1997), British jazz musician and stride pianist

=== E ===
- E. J. Swift, British author of speculative fiction
- Eben Swift (1854–1938), U.S. Army general
- Edna P. Lowe Swift (born 1949), American educator and first Black graduate of Agnes Scott College
- Edward D. Swift (1870–1935), American astronomer
- Eleanor Swift (1945–2023), American legal scholar
- Ellen Swift (living), British archaeologist
- Ember Swift (living), Canadian singer-songwriter and guitarist
- Emma Swift (born 1981), Australian singer-songwriter and former radio broadcaster
- Eugene Swift (born 1964), American former hurdler

=== F ===
- Frances Swift (disambiguation), several people
- Francie Swift (born 1969/1970), American actress
- Francis Swift (1827–1892), Irish dean
- Frank Swift (1913–1958), English footballer
- Fred Swift (1938–1983), Australian rules footballer
- Frederick W. Swift (1831–1916), U.S. Army colonel

=== G ===
- George Swift (disambiguation)
- Graham Swift (born 1949), British novelist, poet and writer
- Granville Swift (disambiguation), several people
- Greggmar Swift (born 1991), Barbadian hurdler
- Gustavus Franklin Swift (1839–1903), American entrepreneur, founder of Swift & Company meatpacking plants

=== H ===
- Harlan J. Swift (1843–1910), U.S. Army captain and Medal of Honor recipient
- Harry Swift (disambiguation)
- Heman Swift (1733–1814), U.S. Army soldier and American judge
- Henry Swift (disambiguation)
- Hildegarde Swift (1890–1977), American author

=== I ===
- Ike Swift, pen name of Owen Davis (1874–1956), American dramatist, playwright and screenwriter
- Innis P. Swift (1882–1953), U.S. Army general
- Ira P. Swift (1898–1987), U.S. Army major general

=== J ===
- Jack Swift (born 1985), New Zealand athlete
- James Swift (disambiguation), several people
- Jamie Swift (living), Canadian activist, author and journalist
- Jane Swift (born 1965), American politician and executive
- Jason Swift (born 1970), Australian cricket coach and former cricketer
- Jason Swift (1971–1985), English gang rape and murder victim; see Sidney Cooke
- Jasper Swift (died 1620), English archdeacon
- Jennifer Patrick-Swift (living), American former softball coach
- Jeremy Swift (born 1960), English actor
- Joe Swift (born 1965), English garden designer, journalist and television presenter
- Joel Swift (born 1990), Australian water polo player
- John Swift (disambiguation), several people
- Jon Swift, pseudonym of Al Weisel (1963–2010), American writer
- Jonathan Swift (1667–1745), Irish author, satirist, political pamphleteer and cleric
- Jonathan Swift (disambiguation), several people
- Joseph Gardner Swift (1783–1865), American army officer and superintendent of the United States Military Academy
- Joy Swift (born 1956), British businesswoman, writer and events organiser
- Justin Swift (born 1975), American former football player

=== K ===
- Kate Bisschop-Swift (1834–1928), English-born Dutch painter
- Kate Swift (1923–2011), American feminist writer and editor
- Katherine Swift (1956–2004), Irish-born Portuguese artist, ceramicist and illustrator
- Kay Swift (1897–1993), American composer and songwriter
- Kelly Jack Swift (1920–1965), American baseball player
- Ken Swift (born 1966), Puerto Rican breakdancer
- Kiana Swift (born 2000), Canadian-born Tongan soccer player
- Kim Swift (born 1982 or 1983), American video game designer

=== L ===
- L.E. Swift, pseudonym of Elie Siegmeister (1909–1991), American author, composer and educator
- Lela Swift (1919–2015), American television director and producer
- Lewis A. Swift (1820–1913), American astronomer
- Louis Swift (1861–1937), American industrialist
- Lucy Swift, birth name of Lucy Hardcastle (early 1770s–1834), British botanist and teacher

=== M ===
- Malcolm Swift (born 1974), English former cricketer
- Mark Swift (living), American screenwriter and film producer
- Mary Swift (disambiguation), several people
- Matthew Swift (born 1986), American entrepreneur
- Michael Swift (disambiguation), several people
- Morrison I. Swift (1856–1946), American activist, organizer, social theorist and writer

=== N ===
- Nate Swift (born 1985), American former football player

=== O ===
- Oscar W. Swift (1869–1940), American attorney and politician
- Owen Swift (1814–1879), British bare-knuckle prize fighter

=== P ===
- Parton Swift (1876–1952), American judge, lawyer and politician
- Patrick Swift (1927–1983), Irish artist, painter, art critic, editor, illustrator, writer and magazine founder
- Paul Swift (1934–1994), American actor
- Paul Swift (driver) (born 1979), British driver
- Per Egil Swift (born 1972), Norwegian football player-manager and former footballer
- Philetus Swift (1763–1828), American politician

=== R ===
- R.B. Swift (living), American journalist
- Rebecca Swift (1964–2017), British poet and essayist
- Richard Swift (disambiguation), several people
- Rigby Swift (1874–1937), British barrister, judge and politician
- Robert Swift (disambiguation), several people
- Russ Swift (born 1951), British driver

=== S ===
- Sally Swift (1913–2009), American equestrian
- Samuel Swift (1659–1718), English politician
- Sarah Swift (1854–1937), English nurse and nursing administrator
- Scott H. Swift (born 1957), retired United States Navy admiral
- Sidney Swift (born 1988), American entrepreneur, inventor and record producer
- Skeeter Swift (1946–2017), American basketball player
- Stephen Swift (disambiguation), several people
- Stromile Swift (born 1979), American former basketball player
- Susan Swift (living), American actress
- Susie Forrest Swift (Sister M. Imelda Teresa; 1862–1916), American editor, Salvation Army worker and Catholic nun

=== T ===
- Theophilus Swift (1746–1815), Irish poet and writer
- Taylor Swift (born 1989), American singer-songwriter
- Toby Swift (born 20th century), British radio director and producer
- Todd Swift (born 1966), British-Canadian poet, screenwriter, university teacher, editor, critic and publisher
- Tom Swift (disambiguation), several people
- Tony Swift (born 1959), English former international rugby union player
- Trevor Swift (1948–2022), English footballer

=== V ===
- Veronica Swift (born 1994), American jazz and bebop singer
- Victoria Swift (born 1995), Trinidadian and Tobagonian association footballer

=== W ===
- Wally Swift (1936–2012), British boxer
- Wally Swift Jr (born 1966), British former boxer
- Wesley A. Swift (1913–1970), American minister
- William Swift (1848–1919), governor of Guam and United States Navy rear admiral
- William Swift (disambiguation), several people

=== Z ===
- Zephaniah Swift (1759–1823), American chief justice, diplomat, judge, law professor, lawyer, politician and writer

== See also ==
- General Swift (disambiguation)
- Governor Swift (disambiguation)
- Justice Swift (disambiguation)
- Senator Swift (disambiguation)
