= Swift (given name) =

People with the given name Swift include:

== As a first name ==
- Swift Berry (1887–1967), American forestry expert and politician
- Swift Burch (1969–2025), American and Canadian gridiron football player

== As a middle name ==
=== In arts and media ===
==== Writers ====
- Herbert S. Carter (1869–1927), American physician and writer
- Christopher Dickey (1951–2020), American author, journalist and news editor
- Mary Swift Lamson (1822–1909), American educator and writer
- Julia Swift Orvis (1872–1949), American college professor, pacifist and author
- Helen Swift Neilson (1869–1945), American writer and art collector

==== In other arts ====
- Winston Swift Boyer (born 1954), American photographer
- Frank Swift Chase (1886–1958), American painter
- William Swift Daniell (1865–1933), American painter
- Lemuel Punderson (1824–1910), American engraver and printer

=== In business ===
- Martin S. Auer (1918–1991), American businessman and politician
- Franklin Swift Billings (1862–1935), American businessman and politician
- Briggs Cunningham (1907–2003; born Briggs Swift Cunningham II), American entrepreneur and sportsman
- Zephaniah Swift Spalding (1837–1927), American businessman, soldier and sugar plantation owner
- F. S. Wolcott (1882–1967; born Fred Swift Wolcott), American entertainment businessman and cotton planter

=== In politics ===
- Martin S. Auer (1918–1991), American businessman and politician
- Franklin Swift Billings (1862–1935), American businessman and politician
- Patricia Swift Blalock (1914–2011), American librarian, social worker and civil rights activist
- Edward Swift Isham (1836–1902), American lawyer and politician
- J. G. Swift MacNeill (1849–1926; born John Gordon Swift MacNeill), Irish politician
- Susan J. Swift Steele (1822–1895), American social reformer

=== In science and academia ===
- Frank Swift Bourns (1866–1935), American ornithologist and medical doctor
- Herbert S. Carter (1869–1927), American physician and writer
- Mary Swift Lamson (1822–1909), American educator and writer
- Helen S. Mitchell (1895–1984), American biochemist and nutritionist
- Zephaniah Swift Moore (1770–1823), American academic administrator and educator
- Julia Swift Orvis (1872–1949), American college professor, pacifist and author

=== In sport ===
- Briggs Cunningham (1907–2003; born Briggs Swift Cunningham II), American entrepreneur and sportsman
- Harold Kaye (1882–1953), English cricketer
- Dick Steane (1939–2007, born Richard Swift Steane), British sprinter

=== In other fields ===
- Patricia Swift Blalock (1914–2011), American librarian, social worker and civil rights activist
- Charles Lillicrap (1887–1966), British naval architect
- Helen Swift Neilson (1869–1945), American writer and art collector
- Zephaniah Swift Spalding (1837–1927), American businessman, soldier and sugar plantation owner
- F. S. Wolcott (1882–1967; born Fred Swift Wolcott), American entertainment businessman and cotton planter

== See also ==
- Swift (disambiguation) § People, including people with Swift as a nickname, stage name, or epithet
- Swift (surname)
