= Swift =

Swift may refer to:

== Arts and media ==
=== Fictional characters ===
- Jack Swift, in the 2004 video game Red Dead Revolver
- Jonathan Swift, alter ego of Blue Streak (Jonathan Swift), in Marvel Comics
- Logan Swift, in The Edge of the Night
- Margaret Swift-Bejarano, played by Dana Delany
- Philip Swift, in Pirates of the Caribbean: On Stranger Tides
- Tom Swift, the central character in five series of books of juvenile science fiction and adventure novels, first appearing in 1910
- Tom Swift Jr., following in the tradition of the earlier Tom Swift novels, first appearing in 1954
- Swift (character), comic-book character from The Authority
- Swift Alternetter, in the film Cars
- Swift Otter, played by Brett Halsey
- Swift Paul, in Blaze and the Monster Machines
- Swift Saber Qi Liu, nickname of Qi Laoliu character in Demi-Gods and Semi-Devils
- Swift Wind, a fictional character from She-Ra: Princess of Power
- Swift Wolf, played by Miguel Ángel Landa
- Miss Swift, in Cardiacs

=== Other uses in arts and media ===
- Swift, a newsletter of the James Randi Educational Foundation
- Swift (comic), a Hulton Press publication related to Eagle

== Military ==
- HSV-2 Swift, a non-commissioned catamaran leased by the US Navy
  - Swift Boats, used by the US Navy in the Vietnam War
- Swift-class coastal patrol craft, patrol vessels built for the Republic of Singapore Navy
- HMS Swift, several ships of British Royal Navy
- Operation Swift, in the Vietnam War
- .220 Swift, a rifle cartridge

== Organizations ==
=== Sport ===
- Swifts F.C., a defunct English football club
- Berlin Swifts F.C., a Northern Irish football club
- Dungannon Swifts F.C., a Northern Irish football club
- Linfield Swifts, Northern Irish reserves football team
- Markethill Swifts F.C., a Northern Irish football club
- Ballysillan Swifts F.C., a Northern Irish football club
- Bangor Swifts F.C., a Northern Irish football club
- St James Swifts F.C., a Northern Irish football club
- New South Wales Swifts, an Australian netball team
- Swifts (aerobatic team), a Russian aerobatic team

=== Transportation companies ===
- Swift Cooper, a British racing car manufacturer
- Swift Leisure, a British manufacturer of caravans
- Swift Motor Company, of Coventry, England
- Swift Transportation, a US trucking company

=== Other organizations ===
- SWIFT, an international organization facilitating transactions between banks
  - SWIFT code or ISO 9362, the SWIFT/BIC code standard in banking
- Swift Engineering, an American engineering firm
- Swift & Company, a meat processing company
- Swifts (aerobatic team), a Russian aerobatic team

== People ==
=== Surname ===
- Swift (surname)
- Jonathan Swift, Anglo-Irish writer
- Taylor Swift, American singer and songwriter

=== Nickname, stage name, or epithet ===
- Ashot the Swift (died 939), Georgian prince
- Swift (rapper) (born Ondre Moore), US rapper in D12
- J-Swift (born 1971), Spanish-born American record producer
- K-Swift (1978–2008), American DJ, MC, radio personality and entrepreneur, musician, singer, rapper and record producer
- R-Swift (born 1981), American musician, rapper and singer
- Swift Nick, nickname of John Nevison (1639–1684), English highwayman
- Swift Runner, nickname of Maris Bryant Pierce (1811–1874), Seneca Nation chief, lawyer and teacher
- Swift Walker, nickname of Gurdon Saltonstall Hubbard (1802–1886), American pioneer

== Places ==
- River Swift, a river in England
- Swift County, Minnesota, a county in west-central Minnesota
- Swift, Minnesota, an unincorporated community in northern Minnesota
- Swift, Missouri, a ghost town in southeastern Missouri
- Swift Memorial College (1883–1952) in Rogersville, Tennessee, US
- Swifts, Darling Point, a mansion in Sydney, Australia

== Science and technology ==
=== Astronomy ===
- Neil Gehrels Swift Observatory, a NASA spacecraft in low-Earth orbit dedicated to X-ray astronomy and the study of gamma-ray bursts
- Swift (lunar crater), a crater on the Moon
- Swift (Deimian crater), a crater on Deimos
- 5035 Swift (1991 UX), a Main-belt Asteroid

=== Biology ===
- Swift (bird), a family of birds
- Swift butterflies, several genera in the skipper butterfly tribe Gegenini
- Swift lizards, iguanian lizards typically of the genus Sceloporus
  - Snow swift lizards, of the iguanian genus Liolaemus
- Swift moth, of the family Hepialidae
- Swift fox, a species of North American fox

=== Computing and telecommunication ===
- Acer Swift, a thin and lightweight line of laptops by Acer
- Swift (distributed storage), OpenStack's distributed storage component
- Swift (programming language), developed by Apple Inc.
- Swift (parallel scripting language), a programming language for parallel computing developed at the University of Chicago and Argonne National Laboratory
- Swift, the ARM architecture CPU core in the Apple A6 and Apple A6X
- Swift, an XMPP client for Windows, Mac and Linux
- SWIFT (system for wireless infotainment forwarding and teledistribution), a Data Radio Channel (DARC) subcarrier messaging standard

=== Vehicles ===
==== Aircraft ====
- Aériane Swift, a Belgian sail plane design
- Comper Swift, a British 1930s single-seat sporting aircraft
- Globe GC-1 Swift, an American two-seat light airplane produced from 1946 to 1951
- Swift S-1, a Polish sailplane
- Supermarine Swift, a British jet fighter built after World War II

==== Land ====
- Leyland Swift, a British mid-sized bus
- Suzuki Swift, a Japanese hatchback

==== Water ====
- Swift Boat (disambiguation)

=== Other uses in science and technology ===
- Swift (textiles), tool used to hold a hank of yarn
- .220 Swift, a rifle cartridge
- SWIFT code or ISO 9362, a standard for business identifier codes, issued by the Society for Worldwide Interbank Financial Telecommunication
- Swift water rescue, a subset of technical rescue dealing in white water river conditions
- Swiftfuel, an ethanol-derived replacement for leaded gasoline airplane fuel

== Transit ==
- Skokie Swift, now known as the CTA Yellow Line, between Chicago and Skokie, IL, US
- Swift Bus Rapid Transit, in Snohomish County, Washington, US
- Swift card, a public transport smartcard-based ticketing scheme operated by Transport for West Midlands in Birmingham, UK

== Other uses ==
- Structured What If Technique, in risk management
- Swift water rescue, a subset of technical rescue dealing in white water river conditions
- Swift v. Tyson, an 1842 case in the Supreme Court of the United States
- Justice Swift (disambiguation)

== See also ==
- Zwift, a multiplayer, online cycling and running game
