= Thomas R. Swift =

American neurologist and academic

Thomas R. Swift MD, FAAN
- Citizenship: United States
- Occupation: Neurologist
- Known for: American Academy of Neurology President (2005–2007)
- Title: Emeritus Professor of Neurology
- Spouse: Margaret Brown
- Awards: Association of Indian Neurologists in America Lifetime Achievement Award (2012); Medical College of Georgia Lifetime Achievement Award (2022)

Academic background
- Education: Trinity College Hartford (BA); Cornell University Medical Center (MD)

Academic work
- Institutions: National Leprosarium Hospital; Medical College of Georgia
- Main interests: Peripheral nervous system disorders; Health care policy

Thomas R. Swift is an American neurologist, researcher, and educator specializing in peripheral nervous system disorders. A professor emeritus and former neurology chairman at the Medical College of Georgia, Swift has held leadership roles in numerous neurological organizations. From 2005 to 2007, he served as president of the American Academy of Neurology (AAN), the world's largest academic association for neurologists and neuroscientists, where he led national initiatives on embryonic stem cell research, stroke awareness, reimbursement reform, and political advocacy.

== Early life and education ==
Raised in Bay Ridge, Brooklyn, New York, Swift attended Brooklyn Polytechnic Preparatory Country Day School. He graduated from Trinity College (Connecticut) in 1961 and earned his medical degree from Cornell University Medical College in 1965. In 1962, neurology resident Alec Reeves taught Swift neuroanatomy; Reeves's enthusiasm inspired Swift to pursue neurology. He later completed a medical internship at Cornell (2nd) Division, Bellevue Hospital, medical internship at University of Washington Medical Center, neurology residency at Cornell University Medical College, and residency training at Louisiana State University. Swift trained under physicians Jerome Posner and his mentor, Fred Plum. He then completed a clinical neurophysiology fellowship at Mayo Clinic Rochester.

== Academic and medical career ==
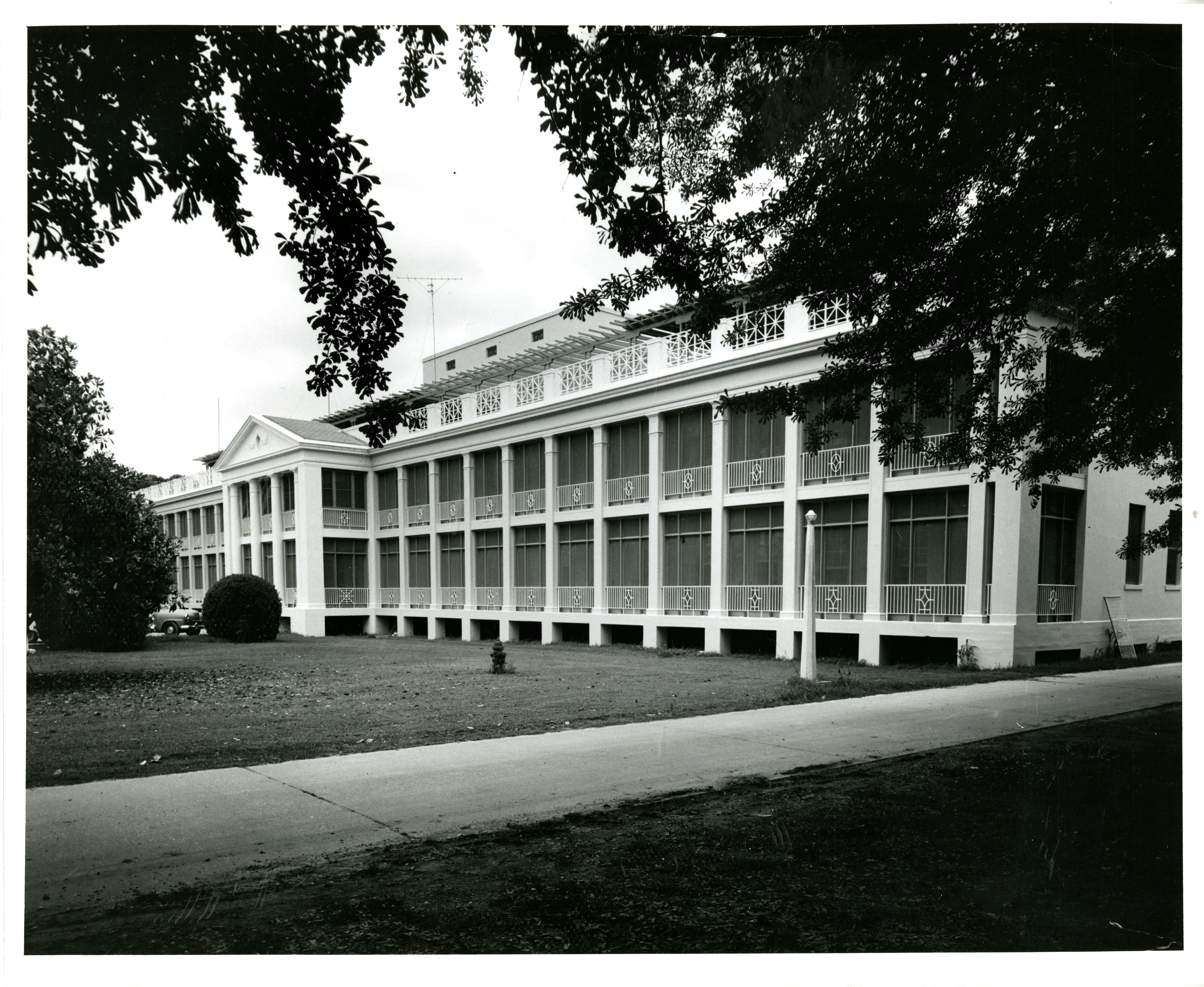
US Public Health Service National Leprosarium Hospital in Carville, LA

He began his clinical career with two years in the United States Public Health Service at Carville's National Leprosarium Hospital, where he treated leprosy patients and published research as Assistant Chief of the Rehabilitation Branch. He joined the Medical College of Georgia in 1973, ultimately serving as department chairman from 1982 to 2000. Swift contributed as a guest author for leading journals, including Neurology and JAMA Neurology. (Note: JAMA Neurology was formerly Archives of Neurology) In recognition of his achievements, he has received the Association of Indian Neurologists in America (AINA) Lifetime Achievement Award (2012) and the Medical College of Georgia Lifetime Achievement Award (2022).

== Leadership roles ==
Swift held leadership roles in many neurological organizations. He served as national president of the American Academy of Neurology (2005–2007), the Association of Academic Leaders of Neurology (Note: Association of Academic Leaders of Neurology was formerly Association of University Professors of Neurology) (1999), the American Association of Electrodiagnostic Medicine (1993), and the Society of Clinical Neurologists (1984). He served in an advisory role as the first electrodiagnostic delegate to the American Medical Association (1987–1991), a committee member for the Accreditation Council for Graduate Medical Education (1990–1997), and chairman of the Myasthenia Gravis Foundation Medical Advisory Board (1989–1991). Swift also served on the editorial boards of JAMA Neurology and NEJM Journal Watch. (Note: JAMA Neurology was formerly Archives of Neurology)

== AAN initiatives and advocacy ==
During his presidency, Swift led the American Academy of Neurology (AAN) through several major national policy and public health initiatives, and he remained a contributor to the academy's efforts outside his term.

=== Embryonic stem cell research ===
On July 12, 2005, the AAN delivered a position statement to the United States Senate supporting the Stem Cell Research Enhancement Act of 2005 (S.471). This statement advocated for National Institutes of Health (NIH) funding for ethically responsible research using embryonic stem cells discarded from fertility treatments. Swift stated that the legislation would give researchers a better chance to understand and treat neurological diseases such as Alzheimer’s disease, epilepsy, Lou Gehrig’s disease, multiple sclerosis, and Parkinson’s disease.

=== Stroke awareness ===
The AAN joined other global health organizations to declare October 26, 2006, as the first World Stroke Day to increase awareness of the global stroke epidemic. Recognizing stroke as a leading cause of death and long-term disability, Swift encouraged improved awareness of the "causes, emergency warning signs, and prevention of stroke."

=== Reimbursement reform ===
Swift recognized that the medical reimbursement system unfairly compensates brief procedures more over intensive, face-to-face cognitive evaluations. He worked to form a coalition of non-procedural medical groups including general internal medicine, family practice, pediatrics, and psychiatry to support payment reform.

=== Political advocacy ===
In 2007, the AAN established BrainPAC, the AAN's nonpartisan political action committee. This committee supports federal candidates backing the neurology profession. The AAN's legislative priorities have included healthcare reform, National Institutes of Health funding, Medicare policies, physician referrals, and diagnostic test supervision.

=== Healthcare reform ===
Following his presidential term, Swift and AAN colleagues published the AAN's position on health care reform in an invited series of articles. They compared U.S. healthcare with international systems and provided specific proposals to achieve universal, high-quality, and affordable care.

== Research ==
Swift has investigated topics ranging from bedside diagnosis of neurological disorders to laboratory research on disease mechanisms. His work in peripheral nervous system disorders includes leprosy, tick paralysis, ciguatera poisoning, myasthenia gravis, motor neuron diseases, focal neuropathy, myopathy, and electromyography.

== Neurological diagnosis and the "Neurobowl" ==
Swift developed an educational program to teach neurologists the rapid, intuitive diagnostic approach of experienced clinicians. He found that clinicians favored this approach because it represents what they do in their daily practice. During his experience as a medical examiner, he recognized his own reliance on instant visual recognition.

I was an examiner for the boards, at that time, the candidate had to examine a live patient. I walked into the room, and the patient was sitting on the bed, and I walked in with a candidate, and I looked at this young girl, and I knew she had Huntington’s disease. She hadn’t moved, hadn’t talked, and I said to myself, “How did I know that?” And I realized I didn’t know how I knew that. She did have Huntington’s disease. But then I began to realize that many of the diagnoses I was making, I had no idea how I was doing it.

To teach this intuitive skill, Swift created the "Neurobowl," an annual American Academy of Neurology (AAN) competition where teams compete to diagnose complex cases using limited clinical information. This diagnostic approach became the basis for his book Instant Neurological Diagnosis.

== Artistic and Literary ==
Swift is author of the novel Carville: Mischief, Mayhem, and Medicine in Cajun Country, a fictional account inspired by his life at Carville's National Leprosarium Hospital. Swift paints pastel and watercolor paintings and has exhibited his art at the Sacred Heart Cultural Center.

== Personal life ==
Swift is married to the noted Augusta florist Margaret Brown.

== Bibliography ==
- Aiken Standard, Post and (2022). "Events Calendar for Aiken, Edgefield and Barnwell". Aiken Standard.
- Association of Indian neurologists in America (2026). "AINA - Previous Award Winners". 4aina.com.
- American Academy of Neurology (2005a). "American Academy of Neurology Supports Embryonic Stem-Cell Research Bill". american academy of neurology.
- American Academy of Neurology (2005b). "Dr. Thomas R. Swift Elected 29th President of the American Academy of Neurology". American Academy of Neurology.
- American Academy of Neurology (2006). "American Academy of Neurology Signs World Stroke Day Proclamation".
- American Academy of Neurology (2017). "Interview with Thomas R. Swift, MD, FAAN". www.aan.com.
- American Academy of Neurology (2023). "AAN Advocacy Expresses Needs of Neurology to Lawmakers and Regulators".
- American Academy of Neurology (2026). "About the American Academy of Neurology". www.aan.com.
- Augusta University (2026). "Clinical Faculty". Augusta University.
- Avitzur, Orly (2004). "Is declining reimbursement forcing neurology into extinction?".
- Brown, M; Swift, TR; Spies, SM (1976). "Radioisotope scanning in inflammatory muscle disease". Neurology. 26 (6 Pt 1): 517–520. doi:10.1212/wnl.26.6.517. PMID 945491.
- Brown, Margaret (2015). A Florist's Walk Down Magnolia Lane: An Augusta Story. ISBN 978-0578174594.
- Brush, John E.; Sherbino, Jonathan; Norman, Geoffrey R. (2017). "How Expert Clinicians Intuitively Recognize a Medical Diagnosis". The American Journal of Medicine. 130 (6): 629–634. doi:10.1016/j.amjmed.2017.01.045. ISSN 1555-7162.
- Felz, Michael W.; Smith, Carrie Davis; Swift, Thomas R. (2000). "A Six-Year-Old Girl with Tick Paralysis". New England Journal of Medicine. 342 (2): 90–94. doi:10.1056/NEJM200001133420204. ISSN 0028-4793.
- Gulati, AK; Rivner, MH; Shamsnia, M; Swift, TR; Sohal, GS (1988). "Growth of skeletal muscle from patients with amyotrophic lateral sclerosis transplanted into nude mice". Muscle & Nerve. 11 (1): 33–38. doi:10.1002/mus.880110107. PMID 3340099.
- Hawkes, Christopher; Sethi, Kapil; Swift, Thomas (2019). Instant Neurological Diagnosis. Oxford University Press. ISBN 9780190930868.
- Medical College of Georgia (2022). "Faculty awards ceremony" (PDF). Medical College of Georgia.
- Medicalxpress (2009). "What do neurologists do for entertainment? They will play 'Neurobowl'".
- NEJM Clinician (2026). "Thomas R. Swift, M.D." Massachusetts Medical Society.
- New York Hospital, Society (1969). Annual Report - The Society of the New York Hospital. [New York] Society of the New York Hospital.
- New York Times (1964). "Miss Andrea A. Veruki Wed to Thomas Swift". The New York Times.
- Nuwer, MR; Esper, GJ; Donofrio, PD; Szaflarski, JP; Barkley, GL; Swift, TR (2008a). "The US health care system: Part 1: Our current system". Neurology. 71 (23): 1907–1913. doi:10.1212/01.wnl.0000336647.02564.59. PMID 18971443.
- Nuwer, MR; Esper, GJ; Donofrio, PD; Szaflarski, JP; Barkley, GL; Swift, TR (2008b). "Invited article: the US health care system: part 2: proposals for improvement and comparison to other systems". Neurology. 71 (23): 1914–1920. doi:10.1212/01.wnl.0000336343.20348.17. PMID 18971444.
- Pedley, TA; Swift, TR; Miller, A; Fahn, S (2002). "Pharmaceutical industry support of the AAN Annual Meeting: Policies and violations". Neurology. 58 (4): 519–521. doi:10.1212/wnl.58.4.519. PMID 11865126.
- Pedley, Timothy A.; Pulst, Stefan; Jósefowicz, Ralph F. (2002a). "Industry relations message" (PDF).
- Rivner, MH; Swift, TR; Malik, K (2001). "Influence of age and height on nerve conduction". Muscle & Nerve. 24 (9): 1134–1141. doi:10.1002/mus.1124. PMID 11494265.
- Sethi, KD; Rivner, MH; Swift, TR (1987). "Ice pack test for myasthenia gravis". Neurology. 37 (8): 1383–1385. doi:10.1212/wnl.37.8.1383. PMID 3614664.
- Strawn, Jessica (2021). Transcending transcending Quarantine: The Artful Communication of Dr. Guy Henry Faget and the Treatment of Hansen’s Disease at the s Disease at the National Leprosarium, 1940 - 1946 (Thesis). University of New Orleans Theses and Dissertations.
- Swift, T.R. (1971). "Neurofibromatosis and leprosy". Journal of Neurology, Neurosurgery, and Psychiatry. 34 (6): 743–749. doi:10.1136/jnnp.34.6.743. PMC 493976. PMID 5003511.
- Swift, T.R.; Nichols, FT (1984). "The droopy shoulder syndrome". Neurology. 34 (2): 212–215. doi:10.1212/wnl.34.2.212. PMID 6538012.
- Swift, AE; Swift, TR (1993). "Ciguatera". Journal of Toxicology: Clinical Toxicology. 31 (1): 1–29. doi:10.3109/15563659309000371. PMID 8433404.
- Swift, TR (2000). "Advances in neurology in the 20th century". Archives of Neurology. 57 (1): 60–61. doi:10.1001/archneur.57.1.60. PMID 10634446.
- Swift, Thomas (2023). Carville: Mischief, Mayhem, and Medicine in Cajun Country. ISBN 979-8854081719.
