= Skirmish near Fort Niagara =

Skirmish Near Fort Niagara
- Part of War of 1812
Date	January 8, 1814
Location	Fort Niagara
Result	American victory

Belligerents
United Kingdom	United States

Commanders and leaders
Unknown	John Swift

Strength
Unknown	70

Casualties and losses
4 killed 8 captured	1 killed

On January 8, 1814 a contingent of 70 Americans led by General John Swift attacked a group of British soldiers gathering wood a half-mile from Fort Niagara.

== Background ==
On December 10, 1813 Fort George, Ontario was abandoned by the Americans because of a stronger British force advancing toward them under the command of General Gordon Drummond. Before leaving the Americans burnt down the Canadian town of Newark. On December 19 Colonel John Murry led a surprise British attack on Fort Niagara while Phineas Riall led an attack on Lewiston, New York. Both were successful. Riall went south burning homes and captured Fort Schlosser. Fort Niagara was garrisoned by the British. Further British attacks at the Battle of Buffalo forced the Americans to abandon their positions on the Niagara River and retreat to Williamsville New York.

== Skirmish ==
The British did not pursue the Americans to Williamsville. Instead, they stayed in Fort Niagara and left Buffalo a burnt ruin. General John Swift of the American militia led 70 volunteers to scout Fort Niagara. A half-mile from the fort the Americans attacked a contingent of British soldiers gathering fire wood. 4 British were killed in the attack and another 8 taken prisoner. The skirmishes noise roused the Fort. A large British force was seen and the Americans retreated 5 miles away to defendable positions. The British did not attack Swift and soon returned to the fort. Swift was praised by Major-General Amos Hall though Swift was warned to stop actions until reinforcements arrived.

== Sources ==
- Cruikshank, Earnst (1902). The Documentary History of the campaign opun the Niagara. Welland Ontario: Lundys Lane Historical Society.
- Hanning, Bud (2012). The War of 1812:A Complete Chronology with biographies of 63 General Officers. McFarland and Company Inc.
