= John Swift =

John Swift may refer to:

- John Swift (barrister) (born 1940), English barrister and Queen's Counsel
- John Swift (cricketer) (1852–1926), Australian first-class cricketer and Test match umpire
- John Swift (footballer, born 1984), English footballer for Bradford City
- John Swift (footballer, born 1995), English footballer for West Bromwich Albion
- John Swift (general) (1761–1814), American military officer
- John Swift (politician) (1790–1873), American lawyer and politician
- John Swift (trade unionist) (1896–1990), Irish trade union leader
- John E. Swift (1879–1967), American judge and the ninth Supreme Knight of the Knights of Columbus
- John Franklin Swift (1829–1891), Republican member of the California State Assembly in the 19th century
- John H. Swift (1840–1911), Irish-American manufacturer and politician
- John Swift, a party in Swift v. Tyson, 41 U.S. (16 Pet.) 1 (1842)

== See also ==
- Jonathan Swift (1667–1745), Anglo-Irish writer
- Jonathan Swift (disambiguation), several people
- J. G. Swift MacNeill (1849–1926); born John Gordon Swift MacNeill), Irish politician
