= Amoris =

Amoris may refer to:

- Amoris, the stage name of Nyamu Yūtenji, a fictional character from BanG Dream!
- Amoris laetitia, a post-synodal apostolic exhortation by Pope Francis
- Sinus Amoris, a lunar mare

== See also ==
- Ludus amoris (disambiguation)
- Vena amoris
