= Frances Swift =

Frances Swift may refer to:

- Frances C. Swift (1834–1908), American Southern Unitarian lay leader and suffragette
- Frances L. Swift (1837–1916), American church and temperance leader

== See also ==
- Francie Swift (born 1969/1970), American actress
- Francis Swift (1827–1892), Irish dean
