= Conservative variants of feminism =

Some variants of feminism are considered more conservative than others. Historically, feminist scholars tend to not have much interest in conservative women. By the 21st century, there have been efforts at greater scholarly analysis of these women and their views.

== List ==
Note

Because almost any variant of feminism can have a conservative element, this list does not attempt to list variants of feminism simply with conservative elements. Instead, this list is of feminism variants that are primarily conservative. It may include organizations or individuals where conservative variants of feminism are more readily identified that way, but is primarily a list of variants per se. Generally, organizations and people related to a particular variant of feminism should not be included in this list but should be found by following links to articles about the variants of feminism with which such organizations and people are associated.

- Conservative feminism (in addition to various variants of feminism in this list that are conservative):
  - Katherine Kersten objects "that in many of their endeavors women continue to face greater obstacles to their success than men do", thus acknowledging that sexism exists, and does not reject feminism entirely but draws on a classical feminist tradition, for example Margaret Fuller. Kersten advocates for conservative feminism based on equality and justice defined alike for women and men and acknowledgment of historical and present injustice suffered by women. She also advocates building on Western ideals and institutions, with reform pursued slowly and cautiously and accepting that human failings mean that perfection is unattainable. Her concerns include crime and violence against women, cultural popular media's degradation of women, noncommittal sex, and poverty's feminization, but opposing affirmative action and class action litigation.
  - Sarah Palin "made her case for conservative feminism" in 2010, at a meeting of the Susan B. Anthony List.
  - Richard A. Posner "suggest[s]" "'conservative feminism' .... is ... the idea that women are entitled to political, legal, social, and economic equality to men, in the framework of a lightly regulated market economy." Posner tentatively argues for taxing housewives' at-home unpaid work to reduce a barrier to paid outside work, also argued by D. Kelly Weisberg to be rooted in a Marxist feminist argument for waged housework, and argues for sex being a factor in setting wages and benefits in accordance with productivity, health costs with pregnancy, on-the-job safety, and longevity for pensions. Posner is against comparable worth among private employers, against no-fault divorce, in favour of surrogate motherhood by binding contract, against rape even in the form of non-violent sex, and for a possibility that pornography may either incite rape or substitute for it. Posner does not argue for or against an abortion right, arguing instead for a possibility but not a certainty that the fetus is "a member of society"; this is because she says libertarianism and economics do not say one way or the other. (Note: Adam Smith was a pioneer of political economy and philosopher in the 18th century; John Stuart Mill, a philosopher and political economist in the 19th century; Herbert Spencer, a political theorist and philosopher in the Victorian era; and Milton Friedman, an economist in the 20th century.) Posner argues that the differences between the genders on average include women's lesser aggressiveness and greater child-centeredness, and has "no quarrel" with law being empathetic to "all marginal groups."
- Maternal feminism
- Equity feminism
- Individualist feminism was cast to appeal to "younger women ... of a more conservative generation", and includes concepts from Rene Denfeld and Naomi Wolf, essentially that "feminism should no longer be about communal solutions to communal problems but individual solutions to individual problems", and concepts from Wendy McElroy.
- Evangelical Protestant Christian pro-feminism:

"Karen .... articulates the Evangelical [Protestant] profeminist position particularly well. Like profeminist Catholics and Jews, she feels that the women's liberation movement was a necessary response to the oppression of women. She praises the achievements of feminism in society as well as in Evangelical communities and insists that sexism persists and that further changes are necessary. Yet Karen, too, criticizes the movement for seeking to eliminate gender differences, devaluing motherhood and homemaking, and being led by extremists who do not represent ordinary American women, particularly with respect to the issues of homosexuality and abortion. Her comments on the latter two issues ... resemble ... closely the statements made by antifeminist Evangelicals."

- The National Woman's Party in the U.S. was led by Alice Paul, described as articulating a "narrow and conservative version of feminism".
- New conservative feminism, or backlash feminism, (Note: This is apparently not entirely the Backlash: The Undeclared War Against American Women written about by feminist author Susan Faludi.) is arguably anti-feminist, and is represented by Betty Friedan in The Second Stage and Jean Bethke Elshtain in Public Man, Private Woman and anticipated by Alice Rossi, A Biosocial Perspective on Parenting. These authors do not necessarily agree with each other on all major points. According to Judith Stacey, new conservative feminism rejects the politicization of sexuality, supports families, gender differentiation, femininity, and mothering, and deprioritizes opposition to male domination.
- Old conservative feminism or domestic feminism, from the 19th century.
- Postfeminism
- Reactionary feminism, emphasizes traditional gender roles, heteronormativity, and the family as solutions to women's socio-economic challenges. Reactionary feminists argue that progressive politics deny biologically based, evolutionarily determined differences between men and women. Many reactionary feminists are anti-abortion. They align with aspects of maternal feminism and reject the sexual revolution.
- Right-wing feminism, or balanced feminism, includes the work of Independent Women's Forum, Feminists for Life of America, and ifeminists.net headed by Wendy McElroy. It generally draws on principles of first-wave feminism, and against both post-feminism and academic or radical feminism, the latter being defined to include left and progressive politics, not only feminism based on gender oppression. Right-wing feminism supports both motherhood and women having careers, and both individuality and biological determinism; it accepts gender equality in careers while believing that numerical equality will naturally not occur in all occupations.
- State feminism
  - Carceral feminism
  - Imperial feminism
- The Women's Equity Action League (WEAL) was formed originally by some of the more conservative members of the National Organization for Women (NOW) when NOW was viewed as radical. The members who founded WEAL focused on employment and education, and shunned issues of contraception and abortion. Its founders called it a "'conservative NOW'". Its methods were "conventional", especially lobbying and lawsuits. The departures from NOW left NOW freer to pursue reproductive freedom and the Equal Rights Amendment.

"[T]he fragmentation process, as organizations broke up and reformed, .... retained women within the movement who might otherwise have left it. This is what happened in the case of NOW, when it split up over internal divisions, and new feminism was nevertheless able to retain the most conservative elements through the formation of WEAL. At first, in fact, WEAL called itself the 'right wing of the women's movement.' Another NOW spinoff, Womansurge, tended to attract older women, who felt more comfortable in it than in NOW, which was becoming more politically radical under the influence of a new younger generation of militants."

- In the 21tst-century United Kingdom, it is common for prominent women in the Conservative Party to declare that they are feminists; this trend began with Theresa May wearing a T-shirt by the Fawcett Society emblazoned with the words "This is What a Feminist Looks Like". British female Conservative parliamentarians says that they are feminists and claim feminist justification, while advocating a range of policies, from equal career opportunities for women to, in the case of Anna Soubry and others, opposing pornography. The Conservative MP Nadine Dorries has even put forward a feminist argument for restricting abortion.

== See also ==
- Femonationalism
- List of feminists

== Bibliography ==
- Bailey, Courtney (2006). ""Taking Back the Campus": Right-Wing Feminism as the "Middle Ground"". Feminist Teacher. 16 (3): 173–188. JSTOR 40535471.
- Castro, Ginette (1990) [First published 1984 in French]. American Feminism: A Contemporary History. Translated by Loverde-Bagwell, Elizabeth. New York University Press. ISBN 0-8147-1448-X.
- Castro, Ginette (1984). Radioscopie du féminisme américain (in French). Paris, France: Presses de la Fondation nationale des sciences politiques. ISBN 978-2724605068.
- Dillard, Angela D. (March 2005). "Adventures in Conservative Feminism". Society. 42 (3): 25. doi:10.1007/BF02802982. S2CID 145067701.
- Echols, Alice (1989). Daring to Be Bad: Radical Feminism in America: 1967–1975. American Culture Series. Foreword by Ellen Willis. Minneapolis, Minn.: University of Minnesota Press. ISBN 0-8166-1787-2.
- Feldmann, Linda (14 May 2010). "Sarah Palin – feminist first, tea partyer second". The Christian Science Monitor.
- Manning, Christel J. (1999). God Gave Us the Right: Conservative Catholic, Evangelical Protestant, and Orthodox Jewish Women Grapple with Feminism. New Brunswick, N.J.: Rutgers University Press. ISBN 0-8135-2599-3.
- Posner, Richard A. (1989). "Conservative feminism". The University of Chicago Legal Forum. 1989. University of Chicago: 191–217. Table of contents.
- Siegel, Deborah (2007). Sisterhood, Interrupted: From Radical Women to Grrls Gone Wild. New York: Palgrave Macmillan. ISBN 978-1-4039-8204-9.
- Stacey, Judith (Autumn 1983). "The New Conservative Feminism". Feminist Studies. 9 (3): 559–583. doi:10.2307/3177616. hdl:2027/spo.0499697.0009.309. JSTOR 3177616.
- Swift, David (2018). "From "I'm not a feminist, but..." to "Call me an old-fashioned feminist..."". Women's History Review. doi:10.1080/09612025.2018.1482659. S2CID 150206204.
- Weisberg, D. Kelly, ed. (1993). Feminist Legal Theory: Foundations (Women in the Political Economy). Philadelphia: Temple University Press. ISBN 978-1566390293.
