= General Swift =

General Swift may refer to:

- Eben Swift (1854–1938), U.S. Army major general
- Innis P. Swift (1882–1953), U.S. Army major general
- James Swift (British Army officer) (born 1967), British Army lieutenant general
- John Swift (general) (1761–1814), New York Volunteers brigadier general in the War of 1812
- Joseph Gardner Swift (1783–1865), U.S. Army brevet brigadier general
