= Leprosy in Louisiana =

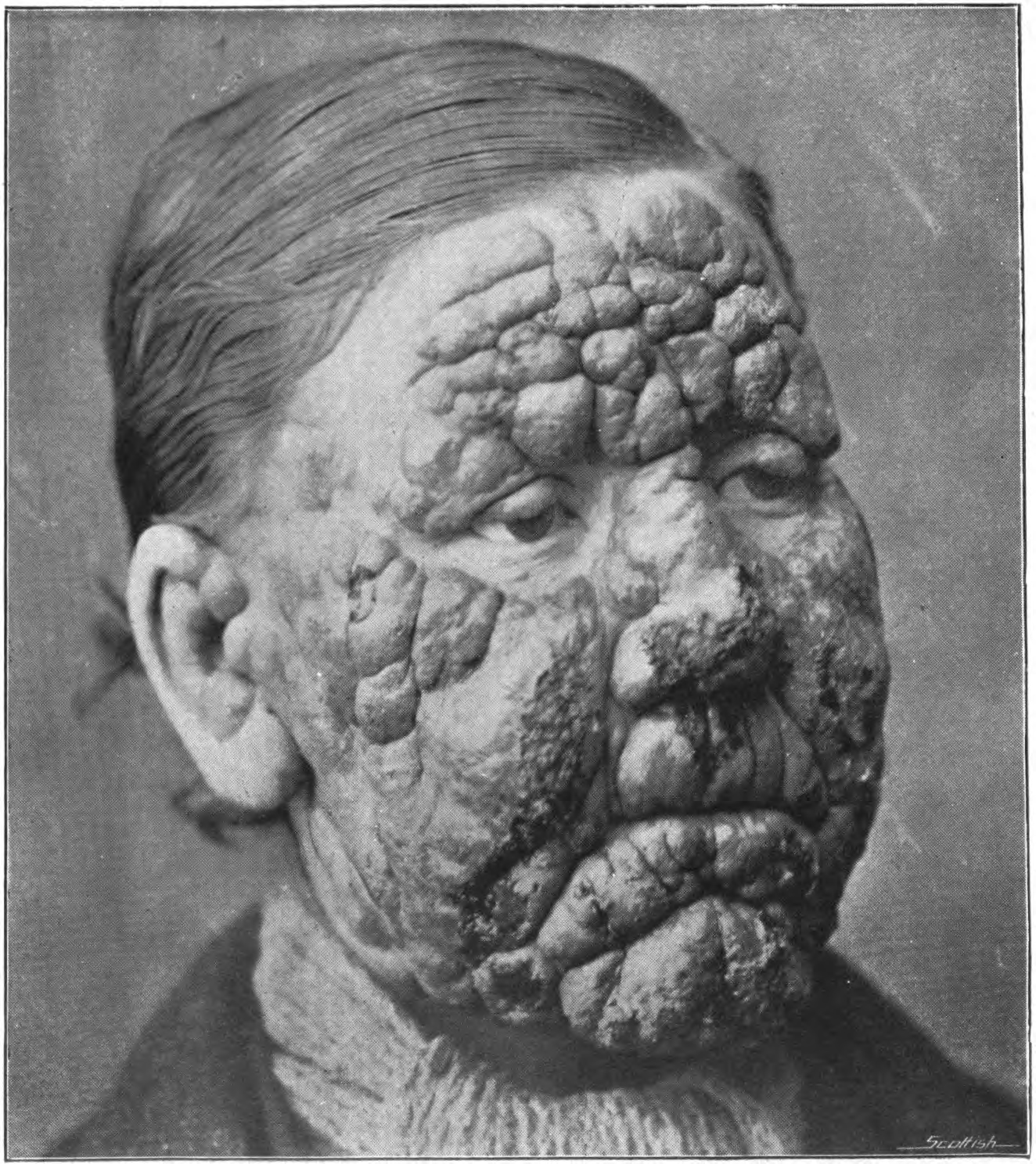
Man with leprosy

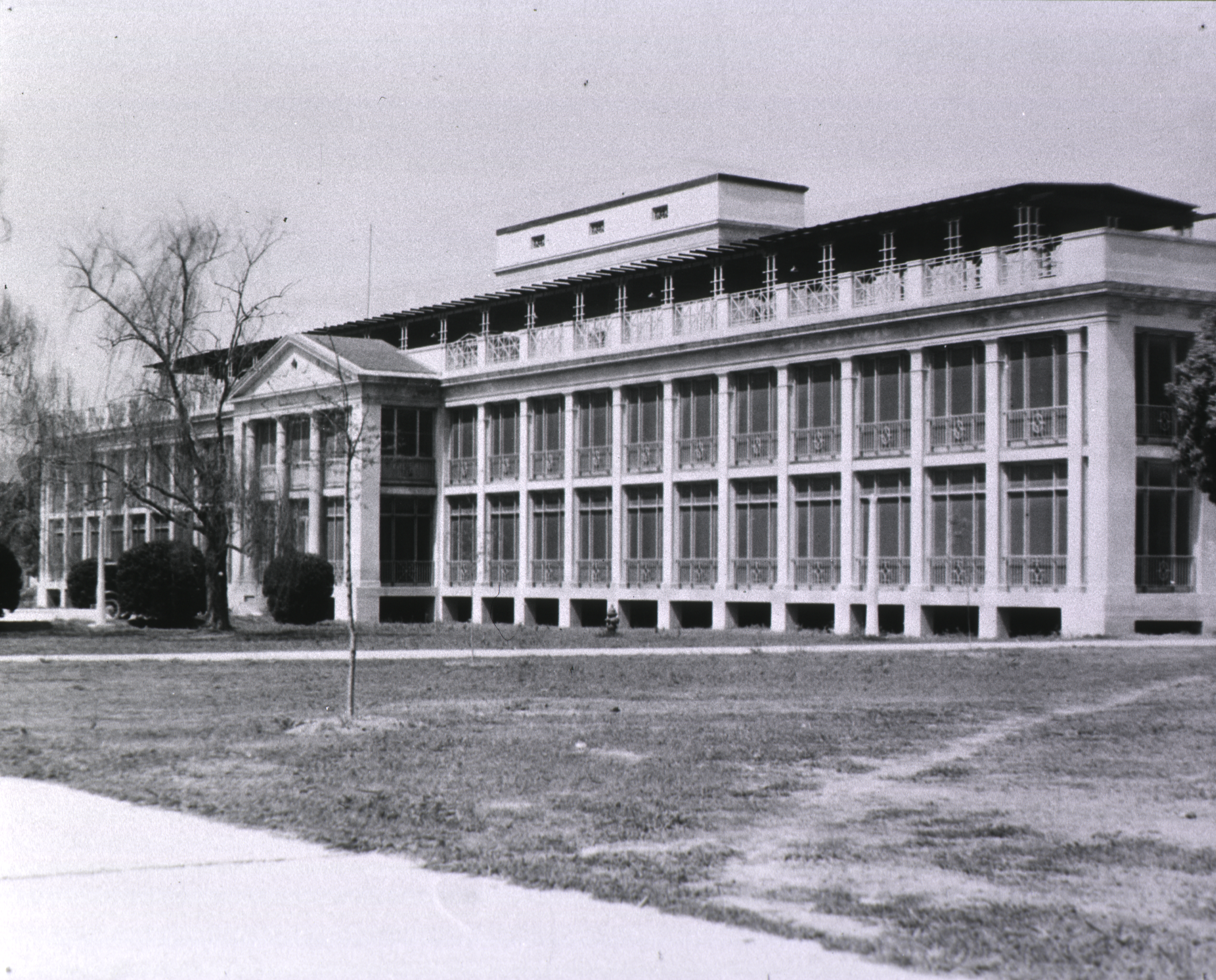
Carville, U.S. Marine Hospital era

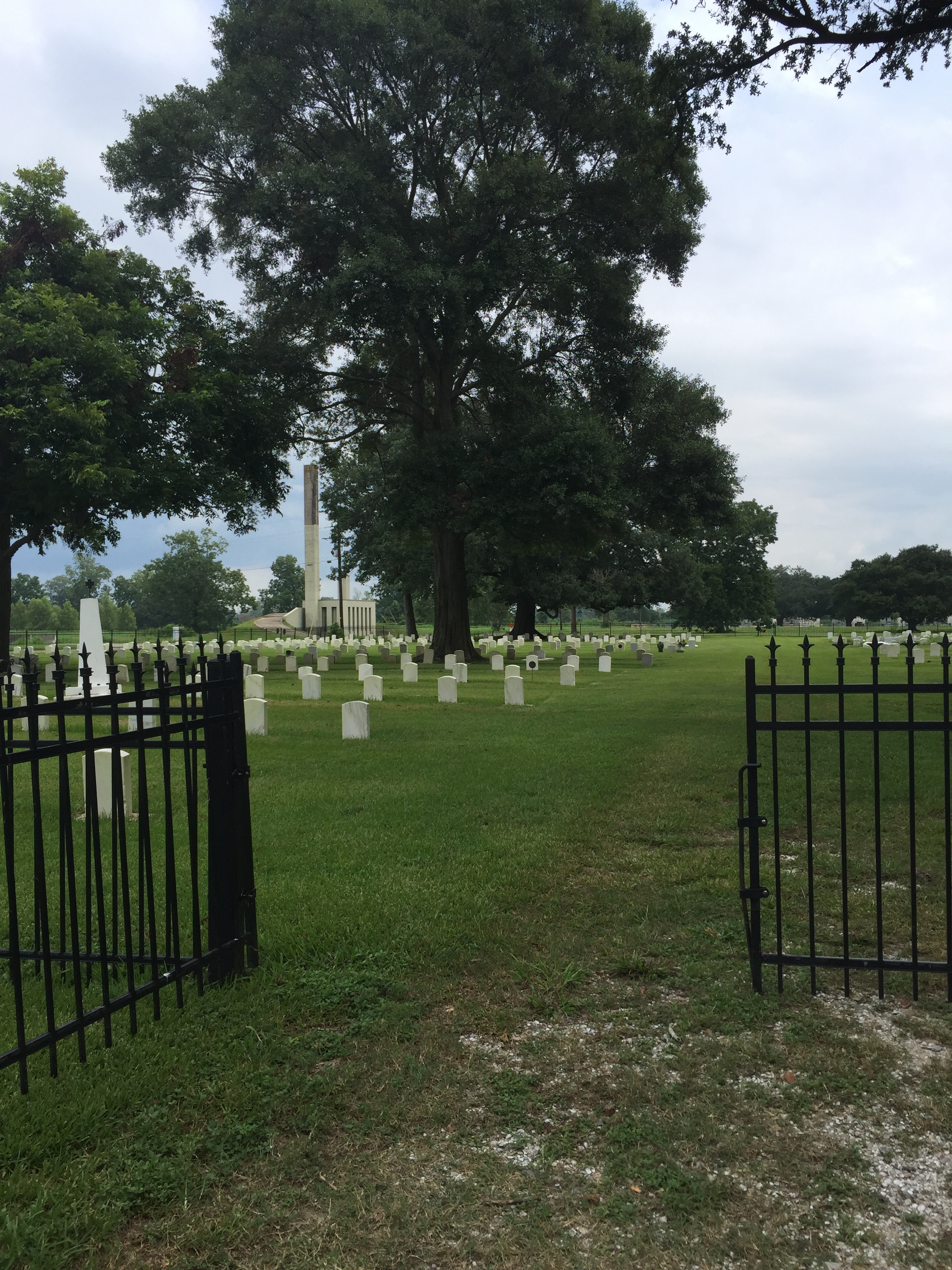
Cemetery at National Hansen's Disease Museum

Although leprosy, or Hansen's Disease, was never an epidemic in the United States, cases were reported in Louisiana as early as the 18th century. Shortly after the enactment of Act 85 in 1890, requiring all people with leprosy to be confined to an institution, the first leprosarium in the continental United States was established on an abandoned sugar plantation near Carville, Louisiana, about 20 miles south of Baton Rouge. It is now closed and houses The National Hansen's Disease Museum. Today, Baton Rouge, Louisiana is the home of the only institution in the United States that is exclusively devoted to leprosy consulting, research, and training.

== History ==
=== 18th Century ===
- The route of Leprosy into Louisiana has not been resolved. However, during the 18th century, while the Spanish controlled Louisiana, Spanish physicians and surgeons noted that many of the Africans brought to Louisiana during the slave trade were afflicted with Leprosy.
- According to City Counsel records, in 1776, the Spanish governor of Louisiana, Antonio de Ulloa, tried to banish all lepers to the outskirt of the colony. Three years later, after much objection from citizens of the colony and a devastating hurricane, this project was abandoned.
- In 1785, under the rule of a new governor, Don Estevan Miro, the issue of what should be done about leprosy was raised again. The solution was to erect Louisiana's first leprosarium. According to the minutes of an April 1784 City Council meeting, it was announced that the governor built a hospital, "so that the lepers may be kept together." This leprosarium was known as "La Terre des Lepreux," or Leper's Land. In 1799, the leprosarium was the home of five lepers. Due to complaints, allegations of unsanitary conditions at the leprosarium, and allegations and findings that none of the five inmates had leprosy, the leprosarium was closed in 1806.

=== 19th Century ===
Louisiana had very few written records concerning leprosy until the mid-1800s. The 1850 U.S. Census listed leprosy as a cause of death and recorded four deaths from the disease in Louisiana.

Beginning in 1857, annual reports from Charity Hospital (New Orleans) indicated that the hospital freely admitted those with leprosy. The large number of cases at Charity Hospital remained unreported to the general public until 1888. This data (known as the Blanc Data, after the doctor that released it) made it apparent that, contrary to popular belief, leprosy was occurring regularly in New Orleans, especially among white citizens.

In the 1880s, the incidence rate of leprosy in Louisiana was 4.5 per 100,000 people. By the 1890s, it was widely accepted that leprosy existed in Louisiana. But the way in which the disease was transmitted was unknown, and there was no cure. When a story in the Daily Picayune alerted residents that a physician, under state contract, was caring for leprosy patients in a "pest-house" near Bayou St. John in New Orleans, a clamor went up for new laws to be passed. This led to the passage of Louisiana Act 85 in 1890, requiring that all people with leprosy in Louisiana be confined in an institution.

Such an institution, The Louisiana Leper Home, was established in 1892 on an abandoned sugar plantation known as Indian Camp in Iberville Parish. Located near present-day Carville, Louisiana, this was the first in-patient hospital in the U.S. for the treatment of leprosy. The first seven patients arrived on December 1, 1894. At first, they lived in what had been slaves' cabins. Four Catholic sisters from the Daughters of Charity of St. Vincent de Paul came to care for these patients. They were housed in a dilapidated mansion on the site of the former plantation. There were several name changes over the years (see "Life at Carville"), but the treatment center was frequently referred to as "Carville" because of its location. The goal of this treatment center was to provide a place for patients to be isolated and treated humanely. By 1896, there were 31 patients at the leprosarium.

=== 20th century ===
In 1921 the U.S. Public Health Service took over the facility and funded a budget toward leprosy research. By the late 1920s, Louisiana's incidence rate of leprosy reached an all-time high of 12 per 100,000. However, leprosy never became an epidemic in Louisiana. The number of residents living at Carville peaked about 400 people.

Medical and therapeutic advances, a decreasing patient population and federal budget cutting put Carville's future in jeopardy by the early 1990s. In 1998 the U.S. government offered to pay the remaining patients $33,000 annually if they left the facility and never returned. 45 patients accepted the offer to leave, but more than 80 remained on the site. By 2015 all of them were gone.

=== 21st Century ===
As of 2001, there were fifteen total leprosy, or Hansen's Disease, cases reported in Louisiana. Thirteen of those reported cases were endemic. These thirteen endemic cases came from thirteen different parishes in Louisiana. However, most of these cases were concentrated in the southern half of the state.

Carville is now the home of The National Hansen's Disease Museum. Several out-patient care clinics around the United States provide primary treatment and medication of leprosy..

== Life at Carville ==
From 1894-1999, the leprosarium underwent several name changes: Louisiana Leper Home (1894), U.S. Marine Hospital No. 66 (1921), Gillis W. Long Hansen's (Leprosy) Disease Center (1986). Due to the various names, the leprosarium was commonly referred to as "Carville." Carville became known as the national leprosarium because all persons diagnosed with leprosy (Hansen's disease) in the U.S. were required, by law, to be quarantined and treated. The leprosarium soon became a center for leprosy research.

=== Identity ===
Due to the social stigmas that surrounded leprosy in Louisiana, upon arriving at Carville, patients were encouraged to take on a new identity. As a result, many patients at Carville changed their names. Additionally, some patients had very limited contact with family members. Visitors were allowed, but the remote location made this difficult. Even the staff of the leprosarium seldom knew the patients' real names or knew what town they came from.

=== Literature ===
- Numerous patients have written books, journals, and have done interviews about their times at Carville.
- Carville: Mischief, Mayhem, and Medicine in Cajun Country, is a novel published in 2023 by American neurologist Tom Swift, MD, based on his experiences as a physician there in 1970. ISBN 9798854081719
- Carville patients had an official publication called "The Star." Issues dating from 1941 to 1999 can be found online at the Louisiana Digital Library.

=== Film ===
- "Secret People" is a documentary that details personal accounts of men and women who were residents at Carville during the 20th century.
- "The Triumph at Carville" premiered on PBS in March 2008. This film retells the history of Carville and provides insight into the lives of people affected by leprosy, including patients, family members of patients, and staff members.

=== Leaving the leprosarium ===
- Patients at Carville were often granted short leaves from the institution. However, they were not allowed to use public transportation and they had to return to Carville once their official leave period was over.
- Escapes and attempted escapes from Carville were reported. Most of the attempts and escapes were made by men. If apprehended, one type of punishment was a sentence in the Carville jail. A first time escape was usually punished with "30 days in jail". Most people escaped through holes in the barbed wire fence.

=== Death ===
Residents of Carville could be buried in the leprosarium's cemetery, if the family couldn't afford to bring the body home or the patient preferred to be buried at the hospital. Each patient received a tombstone that contained his or her name—either their real name or pseudonym—and case number.

== Personalities ==
Many physicians in Louisiana have devoted their lives to researching leprosy. Additionally, numerous patients of Carville have worked to bring attention to the disease.

- In the 1940s, Dr. Guy Henry Faget, a physician at Carville, developed sulfone therapy to treat leprosy.
- During the 1950s, Dr. R. G. Cochrone, a consulting physician at Carville, developed the use of dapsone pills to treat leprosy.
- Edwina Parra, using the pseudonym Betty Martin while she was a resident of Carville, published an autobiography in 1950 entitled Miracle at Carville. Her autobiography was on The New York Times Bestseller List. In 1959, also under the name Betty Martin, she published a follow-up titled No One Must Ever Know.
- Stanley Stein, a resident of Carville published his autobiography in 1963. The book was titled Alone No Longer; his real name was Sidney Maurice Levyson and he died in the mid 1960s. He was the founder and, for many years, the editor of "The Star".
- In the 1960s, Dr. Paul W. Brand began the first leprosy rehabilitation research program.

== Policy ==
- On February 3, 1917, the United States Senate passed US Public Law 64-299, An Act to Provide for the Care and Treatment of Persons Afflicted with Leprosy and to Prevent the Spread of Leprosy in the United States.
- In 1920, the "Home" is sold by the State of Louisiana to the United States Federal Government for $35,000.
- 1921, The United States Public Health Service (USPHS) takes operational control and the 'Home' becomes the United States Marine Hospital Number 66. . . The National Leprosarium of the United States.
- In 1982, The Health Resources and Services Administration: U.S. Department of Health and Human Services, assumed responsibility for the management and operation of the leprosarium at Carville.
- In 1998, The U.S. Congress passed a bill to relocate the leprosarium to Baton Rouge, Louisiana.

== Medical advances ==
- The 1941 development of sulfone therapy, a type of chemotherapy, made leprosy non-contagious.
- Dapsone pills became widely used for treating leprosy in the 1950s.
- In 1981, The World Health Organization recommended using a multi-drug treatment regimen to treat leprosy.
- In 2011, researchers at the National Hansen's Disease Program published their findings that leprosy in Louisiana and in other southern states may be linked to contact with armadillos. They came to this conclusion after finding that armadillos had the same strain of leprosy as some human patients in Louisiana did.
- Currently, researchers are trying to develop a leprosy vaccine and are trying to find new methods of detection.
