= Evelyn Wells =

American writer

Evelyn Wells (7 April 1899 – 6 September 1984) was a 20th-century American biographer and author most known for her biographies of the ancient Egyptian royals of the 18th dynasty, Nefertiti and Hatshepsut.

== Biography ==
Evelyn Minerva Wells was born 7 April 1899 in Illinois to unknown parents. She was adopted by William James Wells and his wife, Edith Alice Squire by June, 1900. The family lived in the Chicago area until about 1905, when they moved to Ashland, Oregon, and then to San Jose, California.

While in the Chicago area (Palos), the family had become friends with Thorstein Veblen and his wife, Ellen. Around 1918, young Evelyn, armed with a letter from Veblen's divorced wife, went to Fremont Older seeking work. He asked instead that she do a piece on being an 18-year-old girl, which she promptly produced, after which she began working with Older at the San Francisco Call, and was even part of his household for a while.

During her tenure with the San Francisco Call, she interviewed Martha Jane "Patty" Reed Lewis of the Donner Party and wrote a series of articles in 1919 entitled "The Tragedy of Donner Lake." She also wrote serials about Lola Montez, Sarah Althea Hill, and other early California personalities.

She married Loyal James Podesta (1900–1987), the son of a well-known San Francisco florist, about 1925, and had two children with him. She retained her maiden name in her many books, though she is referred to in a few accounts as Evelyn Wells Podesta. She appears to have separated from her husband by 1950, when she purchased a home in New York for herself and her two children.

In addition to the books listed below, she also edited Betty Martin's best-selling "Miracle at Carville" (Doubleday, 1950) and its sequel, "No One Must Ever Know" (Doubleday, 1959).

In 1977, she travelled with "lifelong friend" Nathalia Walker Richmond to Colorado to revisit the childhood home of Nathalia (supposedly last living daughter of John Brisben Walker) at Mt. Falcon, near Morrison, Colorado.

She died 6 September 1984 in Seattle, Washington.

== Bibliography ==
- 1936 Fremont Older, A Biography
- 1939 Champagne Days of San Francisco
- 1940 Men at their Worst (with Leo Stanley)
- 1946 What to Name the Baby
- 1947 Jed Blaine's Woman
- 1949 The Forty Niners (with Harry C. Peterson)
- 1951 Life Starts Today
- 1953 The Gentle Kingdom of Giacomo
- 1964 Nefertiti
- 1964 Carlos P. Romulo: Voice of Freedom
- 1967 A City for St. Francis
- 1969 Hatshepsut
- 1974 I Am Thinking of Kelda
