= Robert Swift (disambiguation) =

Robert Swift (born 1985) is an American basketball player.

Robert Swift may also refer to:

- Bob Swift (Robert Virgil Swift, 1915–1966), American baseball catcher, coach, manager and scout
- Bob Swift (Canadian football) (born 1943), American offensive lineman in the Canadian Football League
- Rob Swift (born 1972), American hip-hop DJ and turntablist
- Robby Swift (born 1984), English windsurfer

== See also ==
- Swift (surname)
