= James Swift =

James Swift may refer to:

- James Swift (trade unionist) (1841/42–1904), British trade unionist
- James Swift (British Army officer), British major-general
- James M. Swift (lawyer) (1873–1946), attorney general of Massachusetts
- James M. Swift (American football) (fl. 1891), American football coach
- James Q. Swift, American oral and maxillofacial surgeon and academic
- Larry James (1947–2008), American sprinter also known as James Swift
