= Tom Swift (disambiguation) =

Tom Swift is the name of the central fictional character in six series of juvenile science fiction and adventure novels.

- Tom Swift Jr., a character in a series of 33 adventure novels
- Tom Swift III, unofficial name of the third series to feature Tom Swift
- Tom Swift IV, unofficial name of the fourth series to feature Tom Swift
- Tom Swifty, a phrase in which a quoted sentence is linked by a pun to the manner in which it's attributed - e.g., "'It's freezing,' Tom muttered icily."
- Tom Swift (TV series), which ran for one season in 2022.

Tom Swift may also refer to:

- Tom Swift (footballer) (born 1990), Australian rules footballer
- Tom Swift (politician) (born 1944), American politician in Pennsylvania
- Thomas R. Swift, American neurologist
