= 2nd New York Mounted Rifles Regiment =

2nd Regiment New York Mounted Rifles
- Active: August 24, 1863- August 10, 1865
- Country: United States
- Allegiance: Union
- Branch: Union Army
- Type: Mounted Infantry
- Nickname(s): Governor's Guard
- Engagements: American Civil War: Battle of Spotsylvania Court House; Battle of North Anna; Battle of Totopotomoy Creek; Battle of Cold Harbor; Second Battle of Petersburg; Siege of Petersburg; Battle of the Crater; Battle of Globe Tavern; Battle of Peebles's Farm; Battle of Hatcher's Run; Battle of Dinwiddie Court House; Battle of Five Forks; Battle of Namozine Church; Battle of Amelia Springs; Battle of Sailor's Creek; Battle of Cumberland Church; Battle of Appomattox Court House

Commanders
- Notable commanders: Col. John Fisk

The 2nd Regiment New York Mounted Rifles was a cavalry regiment of the Union Army during the American Civil War.

== Service ==
Organized at Lockport and Buffalo, N. Y., and mustered in by Companies as follows "A" October 31, "I" November 2, 1863; "B" January 12, "C" January 26, "D" January 27, "E" January 29, "L" January 29. "F" and "G" February 5, "H" February 4, "K" February 6 and "M" February 13, 1864. Moved to Washington, D. C., March 4, 1864, thence to Belle Plains, Va. Attached to 22nd Army Corps, Dept. of Washington, D. C., to May 15, 1864. Provisional Brigade, 1st Division, 9th Army Corps, Army of the Potomac, to June 1, 1864. 3rd Brigade, 1st Division, 9th Army Corps, June, 1864. 1st Brigade, 2nd Division, 9th Army Corps, to September, 1864. 2nd Brigade, 2nd Division, 9th Army Corps, to November 16, 1864. 3rd Brigade, 2nd Division, Cavalry Corps, Army of the Potomac, to May, 1865. Dept. of Virginia to August, 1865.

== Detailed History ==
This regiment, known as the Governor's Guard, was organized at Lockport and Buffalo in the summer and early fall of 1862. Col. Fisk had been authorized to recruit a regiment of infantry, but this authority was modified a month later, making the organization a regiment of mounted rifles. The companies of which it was composed were principally raised in the counties of Erie, Niagara, Wyoming, Orleans, Allegany and Wayne, and were mustered into the U. S. service from Oct., 1863, to Feb., 1864, for three years. The regiment left the state in March, 1864; served as infantry attached to the 22nd Corps at and near Washington until May; then joined the Army of the Potomac, engaged in the Richmond Campaign, where it was first assigned to the Provisional Brigade, 1st division, and later to the 1st Brigade, 2nd Division, 9th Corps; saw its first fighting at Spotsylvania Court House; lost heavily at Cold Harbor where its casualties amounted to 64 killed, wounded and missing; and in the assaults on the Petersburg works in June it again suffered severely, having 18 killed, 82 wounded and 2 missing. At the mine explosion it was again in action with Potter's division, and sustained a loss of 48 killed, wounded and missing. In the action at Poplar Spring Church its casualties were 76. The regiment was now mounted and served with the 3rd Brigade, 2nd Cavalry Division (Crook's), Army of the Potomac, losing 33 killed, wounded and missing at Hatcher's Run and Nottoway Station. It performed its full share during the campaign leading up to Lee's surrender at Appomattox, its casualties from March 28 to April 9, 1865, amounting to 62 killed, wounded and missing. After the close of the war it served in the Department of Virginia until mustered out under the command of Lieut.-Col. Joseph H. Wood, at Petersburg on Aug. 10, 1865.

Second Lieutenant Harlan J. Swift received the Medal of Honor for his actions during the Battle of the Crater on July 30, 1864.

== Casualties ==
During the war the regiment lost 8 Officers and 94 Enlisted men killed and mortally wounded and 1 Officer and 112 Enlisted men by disease; for a total of 215.

== See also ==
- List of New York Civil War units
