= 1st Connecticut Regiment (1775) =

- Active: 1775-1776
- Allegiance: Continental Congress of the United States
- Type: Infantry
- Size: 1000
- Engagements: Siege of Boston, Invasion of Canada and the Battle of Trois-Rivières.

Commanders
- Notable commanders: Major General David Wooster

The 1st Connecticut Regiment (1775) was raised on 27 April 1775 at Norwich, Connecticut in the Connecticut State Troops. The regiment consisted of ten companies of volunteers from New Haven and Litchfield counties of the state of Connecticut.

The regiment was adopted into the Main Continental Army on 14 June 1775 and was then assigned 24 June 1775 to the New York (Northern) Department. Two companies (Captain Bradford Steel's and Captain Caleb Trowbridge's) were detached 13 July 1775 and reassigned to the Main Continental Army and participated in the siege of Boston. The two companies were disbanded on 20 December 1775 at Cambridge, Massachusetts. The regiment was reassigned to the Canadian Department and was disbanded between 1 December 1775 and 15 April 1776 in Canada. The regiment would see action in the Invasion of Canada and the Battle of Trois-Rivières.

According to the national archives, enclosed below is a letter from the 1st Connecticut Regiment to General Washington dated 31 March 1778. In this letter, the regiment is requesting the appointment of a colonel to their regiment and requesting specifically that the colonel assigned be Colonel Sherman. But Colonel Sherman was not assigned to the 1st Connecticut Regiment in 1778. The post was appointed to Lt. Colonel Josiah Starr.

== From Officers of the 1st Connecticut Regiment ==
Captain Christor Darrow: Valley Forge 31 March 1778

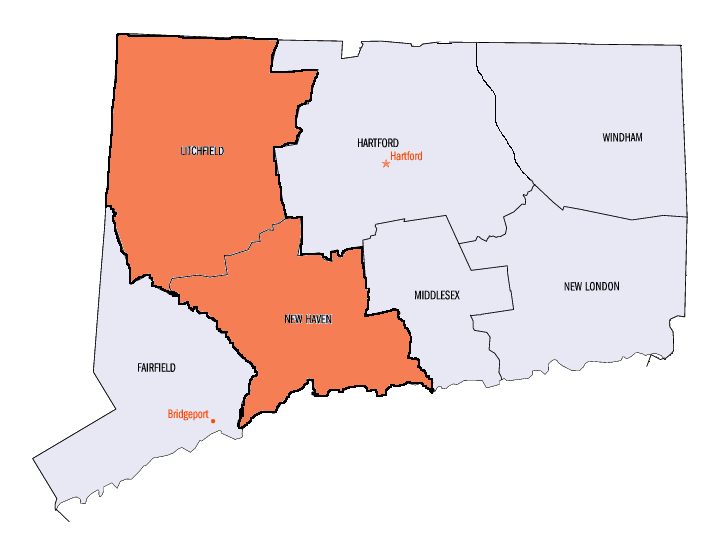
Recruitment areas

To His Excellency Geo. Washington Esq.; General and Commander in Chief of the Armies of the United States of America: The Petition of the commissioned Officers of the first Connecticut Regiment, Humbly Sheweth, That Your Petitioners, since they took the field the last Campaign to the present time, have been destitute of a chief Colonel to the Regimt—Our Lieut: Colonel, daily expecting some other gentleman would be put over him to command the Regiment, did not exert himself for the honor & benefit of the same, as he probably would have done had his situation been otherwise. The necessary inconveniences then, we have laboured under on this account, are too obvious to be particularis'd to Your Excellency: To avoid which, in future, and that the regiment may make that respectable & martial appearance which was intended by the first worthy Colonel of it;1 Your Petitioners humbly beg leave to request of your Excellency that a Colonel be appointed to the said regiment before the opening of the approaching campaign. And Your Petitioners further beg leave to petition your Excellency, that we may be indulged in having Lieut. Colonel Sherman; (whose accomplishments as an Officer, & a Gentleman, we highly vallue,) appointed to the command of said regiment,2 which we humbly conceive would greatly add to the peace & honour of the Same; and Your Petitioners, as in duty bound shall ever pray. Signed in behalf of the commission'd Officers of the afforsd Regiment.

1. The petitioners are referring to Jedediah Huntington, who had been promoted to brigadier general in May 1777. Since then the 1st Connecticut Regiment had been commanded by Lt. Col. Samuel Prentice, who resigned in May 1778 after being passed over for the colonelcy of the 6th Connecticut Regiment. The petitioners had previously spoken to Huntington about their opposition to an appointment of Prentice.

2. Lt. Col. Isaac Sherman did not get this appointment, which went instead to Lt. Col. Josiah Starr, whose commission as colonel evidently was backdated to May 1777.

== Major General David Wooster ==
Born in Derby, Connecticut on 2 March 1710, General David Wooster was a Yale graduate and took part in several early conflicts including the Spanish War, the Seven Years' War, and the Revolutionary War. On 22 June 1775, General Wooster was one of the eight Brigadier-Generals appointed to command the Connecticut Regiment. Of the eight generals, he was third in rank. General Wooster spent most of 1775 in the Boston area. He later took part in the Canada expedition while under the command of General Montgomery.

== Connecticut in the American Revolution ==
Immediately following the Battle at Lexington and Concord, Connecticut sent more than 3,700 men to help in the war against Great Britain. Six Connecticut regiments were adopted on 14 June 1775. These regiments were divided up geographically. Three were sent from the eastern and central parts of the colony to help defend Boston. In addition to supplying troops, Connecticut also aided the war effort by supplying food, clothing, and munitions for the Continental Army. Connecticut's numerous contributions led to the nickname of "The Provisions State."

== See also ==
- 1st Connecticut Regiment
