= Henry Swift =

Henry Swift may refer to:

- Henry Adoniram Swift (1823–1869), American politician, governor of Minnesota
- Henry Spencer Swift Jr. (1838–1863), American early settler of Edgerton, Wisconsin
- Henry Swift (photographer) (1891–1962), American photographer and member of Group f/64
- Harry Swift (footballer) (Henry Swift), English footballer
