= Ludus amoris (disambiguation) =

Ludus amoris is a term in the Western mystical tradition that refers to the divine play (play of God).

Ludus amoris may also refer to:

- Ludus Amoris, a 1902 book in English by Benjamin Swift (pseud. for William Romaine Paterson)
- Cantata: IV: Ludus amoris: for speaker, soprano & tenor soli, SATB, and orchestra, a 1977 musical score in English by Jonathan Harvey

== See also ==
- Ludus (love)
