= World Stroke Organization =

The World Stroke Organization
- Abbreviation: WSO
- Named after: World Stroke Federation; International Stroke Society
- Type: Non-governmental organization (NGO)
- Website: www.world-stroke.org

The World Stroke Organization (WSO) is a non-profit medical association that works to raise awareness of prevention and treatment of stroke. The organization was founded in 2006 from the merging of two organizations previously in existence, the International Stroke Society (ISS) and the World Stroke Federation (WSF). Its membership consists of both professional individuals and organizations that share the WSO's goals.

== Mission ==
The mission of the World Stroke Organization is to "provide access to stroke care and to promote research and teaching in this area that will improve the care of stroke victims throughout the world." The association also works to "increase visibility and credibility of its activities among stroke clinicians, researchers, other health professionals, international professional and lay organizations, and the general public."

== Activities ==
World Stroke Congress

The WSO hosts a biennial congress that provides skill-building workshops to participants. In the past, congresses have attracted up to 2400 participants. Each year the WSO also endorses several conferences hosted by national regional societies that are members of the WSO.

World Stroke Campaign

The World Stroke Organization is responsible for the creation of World Stroke Day and its associated campaigns. World Stroke Day is held on 29 October each year.

World Stroke Academy

The World Stroke Organisation runs the World Stroke Academy, which is the global e-learning platform for stroke education.

== Publications ==
The WSO produces the bimonthly International Journal of Stroke, published by SAGE. The journal contains both original contributions and topical reviews, focusing on the clinical aspects of stroke. It has an international focus, with editors from six different regions. The journal was created in 2005 and became the official publication of the WSO with the organization's creation in 2006.

== Board members ==
There are 20 elected board members from ten regional zones.
