= David Swift =

David Swift may refer to:

- Dave Swift (born 1964), British musician and multi-instrumentalist
- David Swift (actor) (1931–2016), English actor
- David Swift (author) (born 1987), English writer
- David Swift (director) (1919–2001), American director
