= Herbert S. Carter =

American physician and writer (1869–1927)

Herbert Swift Carter
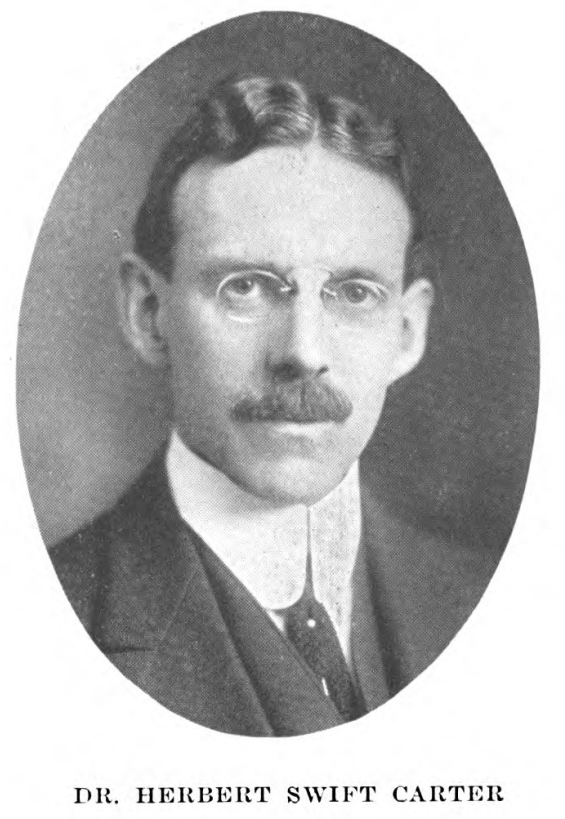
- Born: September 19, 1869; Orange, New Jersey
- Died: October 25, 1927 (aged 58); Baltimore
- Education: Lawrenceville School, Dearborn Morgan School, Princeton University
- Occupations: Physician, writer
- Spouse: Mabel Stewart Pettit (married 1898-1927)

Herbert Swift Carter (September 19, 1869 – October 25, 1927) was an American physician and writer.

== Biography ==
Carter was born in Orange, New Jersey. He was educated at Lawrenceville School and the Dearborn Morgan School in Orange, New Jersey. He obtained his B.A. in 1892 from Princeton University. He studied medicine at Columbia University and graduated M.D. in 1895.

He took a post-graduate course at Berlin University researching pathology. On his return to the United States, he established his private practice in New York City. Carter was an instructor in pathology at Cornell University Medical College for a year. He was assistant professor of clinical medicine at the Columbia University, associate visiting physician of the NewYork–Presbyterian Hospital and consulting physician to the Lincoln Hospital.

Carter married Mabel Stewart Pettit in 1898, they had several children. He was a Fellow of the New York Academy of Medicine and member of the American Medical Association. He co-authored Nutrition and Clinical Dietetics which went through many editions. Medical reviews were positive and described it as a valuable reference textbook for dietitians and nurses.

Carter died after an operation for a peptic ulcer at Johns Hopkins Hospital.

== Selected publications ==
- Diet Lists of the Presbyterian Hospital, New York (1913)
- Nutrition and Clinical Dietetics (with Paul E. Howe and Howard H. Mason, 1921)
