= Andrew Swift =

Andrew Swift may refer to:

- Andrew Swift (bishop) (born 1968), British Anglican bishop and engineer
- Andrew Swift (singer) (living), Australian singer
