= Michael Swift =

Michael Swift may refer to:

- Michael Swift (American football) (born 1974), American football player
- Michael Swift (ice hockey) (born 1987), Canadian-born South Korean ice hockey player
- Michael Swift (rugby union) (born 1977), English rugby union player
