= Henry Spencer Swift Jr. =

Early settler of Edgerton, Wisconsin

Lieutenant Henry Spencer Swift Jr.
- Born: 1838; Waits River, Vermont, US
- Died: April 19, 1863 (aged 24–25); Coldwater, Mississippi, US
- Burial place: Fassett Cemetery, Edgerton, Wisconsin
- Education: Albion Academy; Albany College
- Spouse: Mary Catherine Williams
- Relatives: Joseph Gardner Swift (Ancestor)
- Military career
- Allegiance: Union Army
- Branch: United States Army
- Service years: 1862-1863
- Rank: First Lieutenant
- Unit: 33rd Wisconsin Infantry Regiment
- Commands: Company E, 33rd Wisconsin
- Conflicts: American Civil War; Vicksburg Campaign

Henry Spencer Swift Jr. (1838 - April 19, 1863) was an early settler of Edgerton, Wisconsin and Officer in the Union Army in the American Civil War. Swift was the first person from Edgerton to be killed in the American Civil War.

== Early life ==
Henry Spencer Swift Jr. was born in 1838 in Waits River, Vermont, the exact date of Swift's birth is unknown. Swift was the first child of Henry Spencer Swift Sr. and Diana C. Holden, the niece of Henry Dearborn. The Swift family first moved to Edgerton, Wisconsin in 1854 and were some of the first citizens to plat the city. In total Swift Sr. and Diana had 14 children, only 10 of which survived their infancy. Swift and his nine brothers all graduated from the Albion Academy in Albion, Dane County, Wisconsin before enrolling into a four-year degree in Albany, New York.

== American Civil War ==
At the outbreak of the American Civil War several of the Swift brothers, including Henry, all enlisted into the Union Army. Henry was enrolled as a First lieutenant in Company E of the 33rd Wisconsin Infantry Regiment on September 3, 1862. The 33rd Wisconsin fought in the Western theater of the American Civil War primarily in Arkansas, Mississippi, Louisiana, and Alabama. Lieutenant Swift was Killed in action on April 19, 1863, during the early stages of the Vicksburg Campaign in a skirmish with the 9th Arkansas Infantry Regiment across the Coldwater River and 2nd Missouri Cavalry Regiment at Perry's Ferry, about four miles south of Coldwater, Mississippi.

Private Arthur J. Robinson of Company Wrote in his memoirs years later:

We were in pursuit of a detachment of Forest's army and drove them into their breastworks at Coldwater, where we had the river between us and they in a fortified camp. We had proved our mettle in the fight at Coldwater and won the cheers of the old battle-scarred comrades of our brigade. But we bad lost five noble officers. Our first lieutenant, Henry Swift, was killed in the first volley. Captain Lindsly, of Company H, and three of Company A were also killed, and 17 in the regiment were wounded.

Swift's body was returned to Edgerton by his company commander Captain Ira Miltimore and was buried in Fassett Cemetery. Swift's brother Pardon Holden Swift, originally part of the 11th Wisconsin Infantry Regiment later commanded Swift's old company and resigned from service on September 8, 1864.

Many of Swift's brothers also participated in the American Civil War: Adrian Constantine "Aldo" Swift was enrolled as a Private in Company E of the 33rd Wisconsin, Pardon Holden Swift was originally enrolled as a Sergeant in company C of the 11th Wisconsin Infantry Regiment and later promoted to the rank of Captain of Company E of the 33rd Wisconsin, Byron S. Swift (1843–1862) enlisted as a private in Company A of the 11th Wisconsin as well and died of disease in Batesville, Arkansas while fighting in the Western theater of the American Civil War, lastly William Prescott Swift (1849–1899) enlisted in Company A of the 16th Infantry Regiment, William later became the County Judge in Barton, Wisconsin.

== Personal life ==
Swift was married to Mary Catherine Williams in 1860. Mary was later remarried to Henry's younger brother Pardon Holden Swift on May 25, 1865. Swift and Mary had one child together.

== Legacy ==
Both Henry Street and Swift Street in Edgerton, Wisconsin, were named in honor of Henry Spencer Swift and his father. Likewise, the local Grand Army of the Republic post; H. S. Swift Post 137 was named in honor of Swift, as it was common for GAR posts of the time to name their post in honor of a locally killed comrade. H. S. Swift Post 137 was organized on February 11, 1884, and was disbanded in 1926.
