= James Q. Swift =

American oral surgeon

- Occupations: Oral and maxillofacial surgeon and academic

Academic background
- Education: BA; DDS; Certificate of Completion of Oral and Maxillofacial Surgery Training
- Alma mater: Cornell College; University of Iowa; University of Oklahoma College of Medicine

James Q. Swift is an American oral and maxillofacial surgeon and academic. He is a professor in the Division of Oral and Maxillofacial Surgery at the University of Minnesota School of Dentistry.

Swift's work focuses on pain and pain management, temporomandibular disorders, inflammatory mediators in the temporomandibular joint, and implant research, including clinical trials and basic science studies on dental implants. He has received awards, such as the Ambassador Service Award from the Oral and Maxillofacial Surgery Foundation in 2004, the American Dental Education Association Distinguished Service Award in 2009, the OMS Foundation Research Recognition Award in 2013, and the RV Walker Distinguished Service Award from the American Association of Oral and Maxillofacial Surgeons in 2015. He is a Fellow of the American College of Dentists and the International College of Dentists.

== Education ==
Swift earned a BA from Cornell College in 1976, followed by a DDS from the University of Iowa College of Dentistry in 1980. He then completed a General Practice Residency at Oklahoma Children's Hospital in 1981 and trained in oral and maxillofacial surgery at the University of Oklahoma College of Medicine from 1981 to 1985.

== Career ==
Swift began his academic career as a lecturer at Oklahoma Children's Memorial Hospital in 1985 before becoming a clinical assistant professor at the University of Oklahoma College of Medicine from 1985 to 1989. In 1989, he joined the University of Minnesota as an assistant professor in the Division of Oral and Maxillofacial Surgery and was promoted to associate professor in 1995. From 1990 to 2014, he directed the Division of Oral and Maxillofacial Surgery. Since 2005, he has been a professor in the Division of Oral and Maxillofacial Surgery at the University of Minnesota School of Dentistry.

Swift has also been engaged with the American Board of Oral and Maxillofacial Surgery, acting as president in 2005. He was president of the American Dental Education Association in 2007–2008 and held a board position from 2002 to 2008. From 2009 to 2012, he was a director of the Oral and Maxillofacial Surgery Foundation. His involvement with the MPL Association began in 2015, where he became board secretary in 2016, vice chair in 2018, and chair in 2020. He has been part of the OMSNIC Claims Committee, acting as director in 2006, vice chair from 2011 to 2013, and chair in 2014. He was also a director of Fortress Insurance Company in 2014 and Chair of the Fortress Board in 2016.

== Research ==
Swift has researched pain management, temporomandibular disorders, and implants. With Louis G. Mercuri, he explored the challenges of managing temporomandibular joint (TMJ) disorders in growing patients, highlighting the complexities of preserving facial growth while addressing anatomical and functional issues through total joint replacement. Comparing treatments for TMJ closed lock, he found no significant differences between them and recommended medical management or rehabilitation to avoid unnecessary surgery.

In a collaborative study, Swift introduced two methods, clinical microdialysis and superfusion of dental pulp, to investigate the pharmacology of neuropeptides and inflammatory mediators in orofacial pain management, demonstrating that these methods provide a biochemically based approach to understand and manage pain mechanisms better. Alongside Mark T Roszkowski and Kenneth M Hargreaves, he investigated the effects of the NSAID flurbiprofen on post-operative pain and inflammatory mediators, finding that flurbiprofen significantly reduced pain and tissue levels of prostaglandin E2 (iPGE2) without affecting leukotriene B4 (iLTB4) levels in patients undergoing third molar extraction. Building upon this, he analyzed whether preoperative flurbiprofen affects bradykinin levels during third molar extraction, finding that it reduces pain and iBK levels, indicating an antibradykinin effect. In addition, evaluating the analgesic effects of ibuprofen, pentazocine/naloxone, and placebo on postoperative endodontic pain, he showed that ibuprofen and pentazocine/naloxone were more effective than placebo, with sex-dependent differences in the pentazocine/naloxone group. His research further highlighted that despite new antibiotics being developed, penicillins remain the most effective treatment for odontogenic infections.

Another area of Swift's work has centered on bone health, examining nitrogen-containing bisphosphonate (n-BIS)-related osteonecrosis of the jaw (BRONJ), revealing that long-term n-BIS therapy and recent dental procedures are common risk factors, with spontaneous lesions responding better to treatment than those following dental procedures. He also studied how physical properties of bone, such as elastic modulus and composite apparent density, correlate with initial implant stability and vary between different regions of the maxilla and mandible. Furthermore, assessing the differences in elastic properties and apparent density of bone across different anatomical regions of the maxilla and mandible, he revealed regional variations in bone characteristics.

== Awards and honors ==
- 2004 – Ambassador Service Award, Oral and Maxillofacial Surgery Foundation
- 2009 – Distinguished Service Award, American Dental Education Association
- 2013 – Research Recognition Award, Oral and Maxillofacial Surgery Foundation
- 2015 – RV Walker Distinguished Service Award, American Association of Oral and Maxillofacial Surgeons (AAOMS)
- 2025 – Annual Meeting Dedication, AAOMS

== Selected articles ==
- Hargreaves, K. M., Swift, J. Q., Roszkowski, M. T., Bowles, W., Garry, M. G., & Jackson, D. L. (1994). Pharmacology of peripheral neuropeptide and inflammatory mediator release. Oral Surgery, Oral Medicine, Oral Pathology, and Oral Radiology, 78(4), 503-510.
- Swift, J. Q., & Gulden, W. S. (2002). Antibiotic therapy—managing odontogenic infections. Dental Clinics, 46(4), 623-633.
- Schiffman, E. L., Look, J. O., Hodges, J. S., Swift, J. Q., Decker, K. L., Hathaway, K. M., ... & Fricton, J. R. (2007). Randomized effectiveness study of four therapeutic strategies for TMJ closed lock. Journal of Dental Research, 86(1), 58-63.
- Ryan, J. L., Jureidini, B., Hodges, J. S., Baisden, M., Swift, J. Q., & Bowles, W. R. (2008). Gender differences in analgesia for endodontic pain. Journal of Endodontics, 34(5), 552-556.
- Thumbigere-Math, V., Ma'Ann, C. S., Gopalakrishnan, R., Huckabay, S., Dudek, A. Z., Basu, S., ... & Basi, D. L. (2009). Bisphosphonate-related osteonecrosis of the jaw: clinical features, risk factors, management, and treatment outcomes of 26 patients. Journal of Oral and Maxillofacial Surgery, 67(9), 1904-1913.
