= Justice Swift =

Justice Swift may refer to:

- Heman Swift (1733–1814), associate justice of the Connecticut Supreme Court of Errors
- Jonathan Swift (judge) (born 1964), a justice of the British High Court of Justice
- Zephaniah Swift (1759–1823), chief justice of the Connecticut Supreme Court of Errors

== See also ==
- Swift Justice, detective series
- Swift Justice with Jackie Glass, syndicated court show
