= Brian Swift =

Brian Swift may refer to:

- Brian Swift (cricketer) (1937–1958), Australian cricketer
- Brian Swift (politician) (born 1952), Irish Fianna Fáil politician
