= Stephen Swift =

Stephen Swift may refer to:

- Stephen Swift, pen name of Charles Granville (fl. 1867–1910s), English book publisher
- Stephen Swift (footballer) (born 1980), Scottish football manager and former footballer
- Stephen Swift (judge) (born 1943), American former judge
