= Harlan J. Swift =

American Medal of Honor recipient

Captain Harlan J. Swift
- Born: 2 October 1843; Allegany County, New York
- Died: 6 October 1910 (aged 67); Lakeview, New York
- Military career
- Allegiance: United States (Union)
- Branch: Army
- Service years: 1864-1865
- Rank: Captain
- Units: Company H, 2nd New York Mounted Rifles
- Conflicts: Petersburg, Virginia (1864)
- Awards: Medal of Honor

Harlan J. Swift (2 October 1843 – 6 October 1910) was a captain in the United States Army who was awarded the Medal of Honor for gallantry during the American Civil War. He was awarded the medal on 20 July 1897 for actions performed during the Siege of Petersburg in Virginia in 1864.

== Personal life ==
Swift was born on 2 October 1843 in Allegany County, New York to parents Calvin Swift and Sevilla R. Ault. He was one of four children in the family. He married Martha A. Higgins and fathered three children. Swift died in Lakeview, New York on 6 October 1910 and was buried in Cuba Cemetery in Cuba, New York.

== Military service ==
Swift enlisted in the Army as a private on 5 January 1864 in Buffalo, New York. He was assigned to Company H of the 2nd New York Mounted Rifles. He was commissioned as a sergeant on 6 January 1864. He was quickly promoted to second lieutenant on 4 February 1864. On 30 July 1864, during a Union charge at the Siege of Petersburg, he singlehandedly captured four retreating Confederate infantrymen, an action which earned him the Medal of Honor.

Swift's account of the action states:

Of course it was hot work, but was in no way a surprise, because our entire line had been waiting long for just such an experience. We reached the objective point in short order, to see the enemy going pell-mell toward their second line of defense, a considerable distance away on the Jerusalem plank road. As we reached the top of the first line I could see several Confederates not far off, and, calling my company to halt, I sprinted on after the fugitives. I was very good on my feet and soon overhauled four of the men who, with guns loaded and bayonets fixed, had given me such a stubborn chase. Placing the muzzle of my revolver against the temple of one of the ‘Johnnies’ while still running, I ordered the four to surrender, which they did instantly, fancying, I suppose, that I had my whole company at my back. Then I formed them on either side and in front of me—as a protection against possible shots from their more speedy companions — and so marched them back to our line.

— Harlan J. Swift, Deeds of Valor, page 404

He was promoted to first lieutenant on 20 October 1864 and to captain on 5 January 1865.

Swift's Medal of Honor citation reads:

Having advanced with his regiment and captured the enemy's line, he saw four of the enemy retiring toward their second line of works. He advanced upon them alone, compelled their surrender and regained his regiment with four prisoners.

— R. A. Alger, Secretary of War

He was mustered out of the Army on 10 August 1865. His medal is attributed to New York.
