= George Swift =

George Swift may refer to:

- George Bell Swift (1845–1912), mayor of Chicago, Illinois
- George Herbert Swift Jr (1926–2014), American mathematician and computer scientist
- George R. Swift (1887–1972), Alabama senator
- George Swift (footballer) (1870–1956), English footballer

== See also ==
- George W. S. Trow (1943–2006; third name Swift), American essayist, novelist, playwright and media critic
