= HMS Swift =

HMS Swift has been the name of numerous ships of the Royal Navy:

This list may be incomplete.

- HMS Swift (1697) was a 10-gun ship that was launched 1697 and ran aground off Port Comfort, Virginia in 1698.
- HMS Swift (1704) was a sloop-of-war of the Swift group, built in 1704 and sold in 1719. See List of corvette and sloop classes of the Royal Navy for this vessel and the four following sloops.
- HMS Swift (1721) was a sloop of the Otter class, built in 1721 and sold in 1741.
- HMS Swift (1741) was a sloop of the Drake class, built in 1741, and lost in 1756.
- HMS Swift (1761) was the French 10-gun cutter Le Comte de Valence, captured in 1760 and purchased by the Royal Navy on 6 March 1761. She was re-captured by the French privateer Manley on 30 June of the same year.
- HMS Swift (1763) was a 14-gun sloop of the Swift class, built in 1763. She sank at Puerto Deseado, Patagonia, in 1770.
- HMS Swift (1777) was a 302-ton burthen, ship-sloop which served in the American Revolutionary War. She ran aground after sinking an American privateer and was burnt by her crew in 1778 to avoid capture.
- HMS Swift (1779) was a 14-gun brigantine, launched in 1767, that the British captured from the United States in August 1779. She was commissioned in November under the command of Robert (or Richard) Sutton. (Note: Although some sources state that the French frigates Friponne and Résolue captured her on 11 August 1782, there is evidence that the two vessels the French captured were actually Falmouth packets. It is not currently possible to confirm, or rule out, that Swift became the Falmouth packet Swift.)
- HMS Swift (1793) was a 16-gun Hawk-class sloop launched in 1793 that was lost with all hands while sailing from Macao to England, presumed foundered in the South China Sea in a typhoon after last being seen on 2 July 1797.
- HMS Swift (1794) was a 4-gun pilot-boat schooner built at Norfolk, Virginia, that the Royal Navy purchased in 1794 and that was broken up in 1802.
- HMS Swift (1804) was the mercantile sloop Pacific, launched at Rotherhithe in 1802 that the Navy purchased in 1804, laid up in 1807, converted to a store ship in 1810, and sold in 1814.
- HMS Swift (1817), a Quail-class schooner in service from 1817 to 1821
- HMS Swift (1835) was a packet brig launched in 1835.
- HMS Swift (1879) was a gunvessel launched 1879, and sold in Hong Kong in 1920 for mercantile use. See List of gunboat and gunvessel classes of the Royal Navy.
- HMS Swift (TB81) was a torpedo boat launched between 1884 and 1887, and broken up in 1921.
- HMS Swift (1907) was a unique flotilla leader that saw service in the First World War. She was sold for breaking up in 1921.
- HMS Swift (G46) was an S-class destroyer sunk by a mine off the Normandy beaches on 24 June 1944.
- HMS Swift (P243) was a Peacock-class patrol corvette built in 1984 and sold to the Irish Naval Service in 1988 renamed LÉ Orla.
