= Julia Swift Orvis =

American college professor

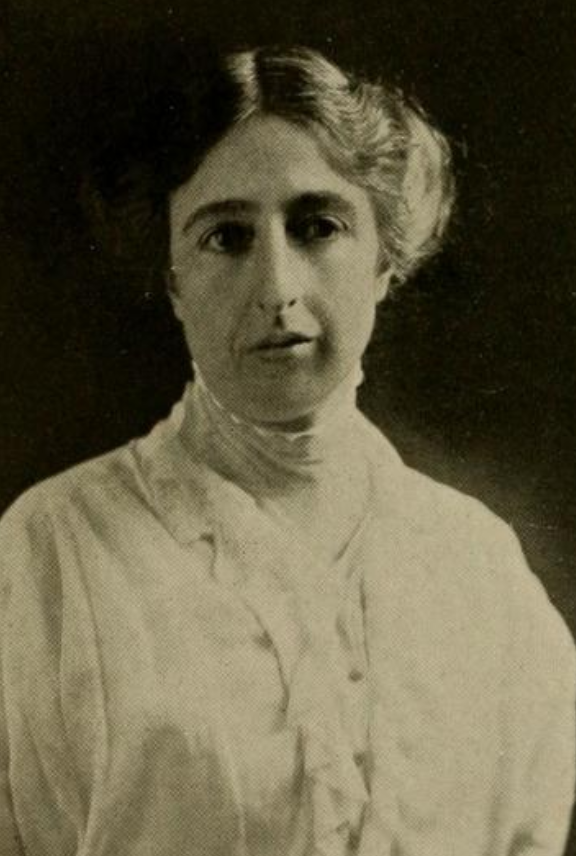
- Julia Swift Orvis, from the 1915 Wellesley College yearbook
- Born: November 22, 1872; Dixon, Illinois
- Died: March 16, 1949 (aged 76); Boston, Massachusetts
- Occupations: College professor, pacifist, author
- Known for: Taught at Wellesley College from 1899 to 1941
- Notable work: A Brief History of Poland (1916)

Julia Swift Orvis (November 22, 1872 – March 16, 1949) was an American college professor, pacifist, and author of A Brief History of Poland (1916). She taught history and political science at Wellesley College for 42 years, before she retired in 1941.

== Early life and education ==
Orvis was born in Dixon, Illinois, the daughter of Franklin Keese Orvis and Susanna Appleton Swift Orvis. Her father was a Union Army veteran of the American Civil War, serving as a white first lieutenant of the 26th United States Colored Infantry Regiment. He manufactured plows and ran a hotel in Illinois after the war; he also wrote a letter of support to suffragist Amy Kirby Post in 1872.

Orvis earned a bachelor's degree from Vassar College in 1895, where Lucy Maynard Salmon was her mentor. She pursued graduate studies at Cornell University and the Sorbonne, with a fellowship from the Women's Education Association of Boston. She completed doctoral work at Cornell University in 1907, with a dissertation titled "The Committees of the Constituent Assembly: A Study in the Origins of Committee Government in France".

== Career ==
Orvis taught European history and political science at Wellesley College for 42 years, from 1899; she became an associate professor in 1907, and retired in 1941 as professor emeritus. Orvis and fellow faculty member Phillips Bradley co-founded the campus book store, Hathaway House Bookshop, in 1925. She also ran a faculty club, and gave lectures to alumnae and community groups.

Orvis was known for political and humanitarian activities beyond campus. She wrote A Brief History of Poland (1916,). From 1920 to 1925, she was executive secretary of the Society to Eliminate Economic Causes of War. From 1937 she represented her precinct in Wellesley town meetings. After retirement, she raised money for the Persian Relief Fund.

== Personal life and legacy ==
Orvis died at a hospital in Boston in 1949. She was 76 years old. Hathaway House Bookshop continued as the campus book store until 1979.
