= Senator Swift =

Senator Swift may refer to:

== Members of the United States Senate ==
- Benjamin Swift (1781–1847), U.S. Senator from Vermont from 1833 to 1839
- George R. Swift (1887–1972), U.S. senator from Alabama in 1946; also served in the Alabama State Senate

== United States state senate members ==
- Charles F. Swift (1825–1903), Massachusetts State Senate
- Henry Adoniram Swift (1823–1869), Minnesota State Senate
- Jane Swift (born 1965), Massachusetts State Senate
- Parton Swift (1876–1952), New York State Senate
