= Governor Swift =

Governor Swift may refer to:

- Henry Adoniram Swift (1823–1869), 3rd Governor of Minnesota
- Jane Swift (born 1965), Acting Governor of Massachusetts
- William Swift (1848–1919), Naval Governor of Guam
