= Mary Swift =

Mary Swift may refer to:

- Mary Amelia Swift (1812–1875), American teacher and textbook writer
- Mary Wood Swift (1841–1927), American suffragist and clubwoman
- Mary Swift Lamson (1822–1909), American educator and writer
