= World Stroke Day =

Day of awareness on 29 October

- Type: Secular
- Significance: Awareness of strokes
- Date: October 29
- Next time: 29 October 2027
- Frequency: Annual
- First time: 2006
- Started by: World Stroke Organization

World Stroke Day is observed on October 29 to underscore the serious nature and high rates of stroke, raise awareness of the prevention and treatment of the condition, and ensure better care and support for survivors. On this day, organizations around the world have facilitated events emphasizing education, testing, and initiatives to improve the damaging effects of stroke worldwide. The annual event was started in 2006 by the World Stroke Organization (WSO) and the WSO declared stroke a public health emergency in 2010. The WSO now has an ongoing campaign that serves as a year-round interface for advocacy, policy, and outreach to support strides and continue progress made on World Stroke Day.

The World Stroke Campaign's goodwill ambassadors include Indian Cricketer Sunil Gavaskar, former Miss Egypt Dalia El Behery and cyclist Alberto Contador.

== History ==
Stroke has been and continues to be a widespread disease worldwide, it is currently the single largest cause of disability and the second largest cause of death globally. In 2016 alone, stroke was responsible for 116 million days of life lost to death and disability. The individual lifetime risk of stroke is currently 1 in 4, and 5.5 million people will die each year. The idea to create a day of awareness began in the 1990s with the European Stroke Initiative. Due to financial limitations, however, the effort was limited only to Europe. The European Stroke Organization continued the project, and celebrates its awareness day on May 10.

WSO World Stroke Day on October 29 was established in 2004 at the World Stroke Congress in Vancouver, Canada. Under the direction of Dr. Vladimir Hachinski, a working group was formed, which was incorporated into a World Stroke Proclamation in October 2006. Around the same time, the International Stroke Society and the World Stroke Federation merged to form the World Stroke Organization, which took over the management of World Stroke Day.

In 2009, WSO leadership moved from a focus on a single awareness day, to a year-round campaign to build a more sustained approach to public awareness of key issues in stroke recognition and prevention and treatment. World Stroke Day continues to provide a focal point for the campaign with biennial themes which seek to draw attention to key issues in stroke prevention, treatment In 2010, the WSO launched the "1 in 6" campaign that would encompass future campaigns.

== Past Campaigns ==
=== 2007 Stroke is treatable ===
The focus for World Stroke Day 2007 was "Stroke is a treatable and preventable catastrophe and hypertension is its most common and treatable factor."

=== 2008 ===
The theme for World Stroke Day 2008 was "Little strokes, big trouble."

=== 2009 Stroke - what can I do? ===
In 2009, WSO launched the World Stroke Campaign, a year-round approach that is intended to sustain efforts at stroke prevention and awareness globally. The campaign was entitled "Stroke, what can I do?," asking individuals to examine what they could do about stroke. It included a competition to create a message related to the theme. The 2009 winner was the National Stroke Association of Sri Lanka, which organized a series of media conferences, promotional materials, and training programs.

Around eighteen countries participated in WSD activities. Among them were Sri Lanka and Australia, which created the "StrokeSafe" awards, Saudi Arabia, which organized a week of public education activities, and Brazil, where healthcare professionals distributed educational materials in a public square. Also in 2009, the Mongolian Stroke Association was formed in response to increasing levels of stroke in the country and joined the WSO in 2010.

=== 2010 - 1 in 6 ===
In 2010, the "1 in 6" campaign was launched to emphasise that, at that time, the lifetime risk of stroke was 1 in 6. The campaign aimed to underline that stroke can happen to anyone, of any age and that everyone should take up the responsibility to learn more about stroke and to share stroke related information. Forty-eight countries participated in this extensive campaign. The Indian Stroke Association announced its decision to sponsor two hundred ‘Stroke Units,’ or centers across India that will be equipped to treat strokes. A Malawian nurse wrote an article describing the campaign, hoping to spread awareness of the disease to Malawi. In the United States, the American Heart Association developed the My-Life Check online health assessment in cooperation with World Stroke Organization.

=== 2011 1 in 6 ===
On World Stroke Day 2011, the World Stroke campaign completed its first year of a full campaign. World Stroke Day 2011 was a huge success with over 2,000 participants from all over the world. It gained recognition from over 20 online publications in several languages. The global reach of World Stroke Day 2011 was a step up from 2010 with increased participation came from Africa, Asia, Europe, North America, and South America. World Stroke Day 2011 received increased response in the media with coverage in English, Spanish, Portuguese, Arabic, Chinese, and many other languages. The day gained recognition across various fields like health, business, and technology and in publications such as the International Herald Tribune. WSD also received special attention in Brazil as the Minister of Health created a video in recognition of the day. Additionally, players from Brazilian football clubs Ceará and Flu wore shirts and carried signs, in a match attended by President Vargas, in support of stroke awareness. World Stroke Day 2011 drew global response through both the WSD Twitter and WSD Facebook

=== 2012 - Because I care ===
In 2012, the Slogan "Because I care… " was launched. The campaign asked people to commit to six stroke challenges:

- Know your personal risk factors: high blood pressure, diabetes, and high blood cholesterol.
- Be physically active and exercise regularly.
- Maintain a healthy diet high in fruit and vegetable and low in salt to stay a healthy state and keep blood pressure low.
- Limit alcohol consumption.
- Avoid cigarette smoke. If you smoke, seek help to stop now.
- Learn to recognize the warning signs of a stroke and how to take action.
- 1st Prize: Neurology Department, University Hospital, Monterrey, Nuevo León, with an Urban and Rural Stroke Campaign.
- 2nd Prize: Brazilian Academy of Neurology/Brazilian Stroke Society with Brazilian Ministry of Health.
- 3rd. Prize: Mongolian Stroke Association.

=== 2013 - Because I Care ===
In 2013, the "Because I care" slogan was used again used alongside the overarching theme of the World Stroke Campaign: "1 in 6". The campaign aimed to address prevailing misinformation about the disease. It encouraged everyone, regardless of cultural background, to think of his/her responsibilities, whether it is to be equipped with stroke prevention information, to correct previous misunderstandings about stroke, or to learn more for family members who are at risk, or survivors of strokes. It also celebrated the contributions of care givers, who are the conduits between the stroke community and the public, as well as an important channel for disseminating correct information. The campaign built extensive collaborations with local organizations around the world and received successful media coverage both internationally and locally.

The campaign was observed in more than 70 countries, from Sweden to Mongolia with coverage in over 23 languages, from Urdu to Flemish. It was featured in over 700 newspaper articles and over 50 TV broadcasts. A diverse range of events were held to raise stroke awareness. The National Stroke Association of Malaysia held a "Hope Walk" in Kuala Lumpur. The "WSC Initiative Mexico 2013" was formed with the collaboration of the Mexican Academy of Neurology (AMN), the Mexican Association of Cerebrovascular Disease (AMEVASC), the National Health Authorities and the help of over 50 medical associations and institutions in Mexico. Health talk shows were held in both English and local language in Nigeria. In Peru, a parade was held. In the US, The American Heart Association launched an iPhone app for stroke prevention. In Sri Lanka, a musical group FLAME held a concert to celebrate World Stroke Day. In Sweden, a TV series with a Swedish comedian on tour promoting stroke knowledge was aired. Numerous other activities also took place around the world in a joint effort to raise stroke awareness and improve care quality.

=== 2014 - I am Woman ===
In 2014 the focus of the campaign was on the specific impact of stroke on women, both in terms of their specific stroke risk factors and the balance of caregiving responsibilities. The campaign theme was 'I am Woman. Globally, women have higher stroke mortality than men, so that 6 in 10 of all stroke deaths occur in women. This is largely due to the greater numbers of elderly women; however, there are also a number of important risk factors that are more common in women. These include atrial fibrillation in older women, diabetes, depression, and hypertension. Some stroke subtypes are more common in women, such as aneurysmal subarachnoid hemorrhage and cerebral venous thrombosis. Gender-specific risk factors include pregnancy and a variety of associated conditions such as preeclampsia, other pregnancy-related hypertensive disorders, and gestational diabetes. Hormonal medications are relevant in some cases. Women tend to have worse stroke outcomes than men. There is some evidence that women with stroke may not receive the necessary quality of care, compared with men with stroke. Furthermore, the burden of caregiving falls predominately on women, and female caregivers report a decrease in mental health and significant rates of depression. These themes will be emphasized at WSD activities around the world.

=== 2015 - I am Woman ===
In 2015 the World Stroke Campaign continued its focus on women. The year-round stroke campaign aimed to intensify global awareness of the fight against stroke with a focus on providing knowledge and enhancing discussion about and with women to international audiences. This year saw 141 event registrations from 190 countries and created 12.9 billion opportunities to read World Stroke Day related articles online.

In 2015 the WSO Campaign Committee held a World Stroke Campaign Strategy Workshop in Glasgow and developed a three-year forward plan for the campaign. It was agreed to provide more support with member advocacy and to move to an annual instead of a biennial World Stroke Day theme. Each year the campaign would focus on a different part of the care continuum covering recognition and treatment, prevention and life after stroke.

=== 2016 - Face the Facts: Stroke is Treatable ===
World Stroke Day 2016 aimed to address a public perception that stroke was an inevitable disaster, by increasing awareness of the role of symptom recognition and access to specialist stroke care. The campaign recognised that although stroke is a complex medical issue, there are ways to significantly reduce its impact. The campaign called on everyone - individuals, families, communities, health professionals and governments to join the fight against stroke. The campaign focus linked to the dissemination of the Global Stroke Services Guideline and Action Plan by the WSO, which was developed to support and drive improved quality of stroke treatment and care around the world.

=== 2017 - What's Your Reason? ===
In 2017 the World Stroke Campaign was focused again on stroke prevention, driven by research data from the 2017 Interstroke study which identified key global risk factors for stroke and their prevalence around the world. The campaign highlighted that 90% of strokes are linked to 10 key risk factors and that there is something that we can all do to help prevent a stroke. On World Stroke Day, WSO mobilised members, partners and stroke stakeholders to do what they could to improve community and individual awareness of stroke risk and take action to prevent stroke at individual and population level. Stroke survivors and caregivers were mobilised to share their stroke experiences on social media, in WSO blogs and at events, highlighting the impact of stroke on their lives and emphasising that it is easier to prevent a stroke than to recover from one.

The campaign in 2017 broke all WSO records in terms of recorded engagement and reach with 208 events being registered in 62 countries, over 10,000 document downloads (brochure, poster, infographic, web banner, news release) a 110,000 Facebook reach on World Stroke Day and 20,000 views of campaign video on Facebook and YouTube channels. Survivor and caregiver blogs generated 7,500 on the newly launched campaign blog platform.

=== 2018 - Up Again After Stroke ===
In 2018 the campaign focus was on issues associated with life after stroke. The focus responded to data from the 2016 Global Burden of Disease which showed that the global prevalence of stroke (people living with stroke) now stands at 80 million and that stroke alone was responsible for 116 million days of life lost to death and disability in a single year. Patient and caregiver testimonies were gathered from around the world to be shared on social media, included in an e-book as well as exhibited during the World Stroke Congress in Montréal.

== Outreach ==
Beyond World Stroke Day, the World Stroke Campaign continues to serve as a source for activism and policy resources worldwide. Through advances in research, and communications at the international level, WSC strives to promote advocacy towards making stroke less of a global threat. The Campaign has supported WSO engagement in partnership initiatives to address common risk factors for NCDs.

== World Stroke Campaign Committee ==
The World Stroke Campaign Committee consists of the following experts:

- Sheila Martins MD PhD, CEO Rede Brazil AVC, Vice President WSO
- Deirdre da Silva, Singapore Stroke Association, WSO Board Member
- Bo Norrving, MD, PhD, WSO Immediate Past-President, Professor, Department of Clinical Neuroscience, Lund University, Sweden
- Patrice Lindsay, RN, PhD, WSC Director, Heart and Stroke Foundation, Canada
- Sharon McGowan, CEO Stroke Foundation, Australia
- Robert Mikulik PhD, Masaryk University, Czechoslovakia https://www.muni.cz/en/people/38765-robert-mikulik

== See also ==
- Stroke
- World Stroke Organization
