= Edwina Parra =

American writer (1908–2002)

Edwina Parra (August 26, 1908 – June 7, 2002), known as Betty Martin, was an American writer and advocate for leprosy patients.

== Biography ==
Parra was born on August 26, 1906, to a wealthy New Orleans family. She completed her education in 1927. Parra was engaged to a medical student when she discovered the first symptoms of leprosy on her thigh. Her family sent her to Carville for treatment and explained her absence to acquaintances by saying that she was recovering from tuberculosis.

At Carville, Parra used the alias "Betty Parker" and worked in the hospital as a laboratory technician. She also worked as a staff member for The Star, a monthly magazine published by Carville patients. On The Star, she was involved in advocating for better treatment of leprosy patients, writing editorials in support of their rights to marry each other and vote. Parra met her husband Harry Martin, a fellow patient, at Carville and they were married in New Orleans after they escaped through a hole in the hospital's fence. Due to their escape, the couple was punished after their return by forced detention in the institution. In 1941, Parra and her husband became some of the first patients to be treated with sulfone drugs. This treatment improved their condition and allowed the couple to leave Carville.

Through her work at The Star, Parra received letters from readers outside Carville and established a correspondence with Hilda Scheer. Scheer, the mother of journalist Julian Scheer, encouraged Parra to write about her experiences for a memoir. Parra began writing a book with Evelyn Wells editing her draft, though the two women never met in person, communicating solely through correspondence.

The book was published by Doubleday in 1950, as Miracle at Carville, and Wells and Parra received the Christopher Award the next year. Edith Sitwell suggested to John Lehmann that he publish the book in England and recommended it to Graham Greene, when he was writing the novel A Burnt-Out Case. Graham's novel, set in a leper colony, eventually included many references to the sulfone treatment that Martin had used. An adaptation of Miracle at Carville was performed on NBC Matinee Theater in 1956.

In 1959, Parra published a second book, No One Must Ever Know, which continued the story of the Martins' lives following their release from Carville. Reviewing the book for the Los Angeles Evening Citizen News, Walter L. Scratch described her treatment after her release as "an indictment of the American people". Following her release, she and her husband purchased a house and an orchard in California using the money from her Christopher Award as a down payment.

In 1989, Parra and her husband returned to Carville to live permanently and receive medical treatment. They both refused to reveal their real names. Harry Martin explained in 1995 that they still had family nearby who would be ashamed of their illness. She described her time at Carville in a 1996 interview with the New York Times. Parra's identity as Betty Martin was kept secret when she died in 2002, with her family omitting any mention of Carville from her funeral service. Her obituaries also ignored her literary career.
