= Patricia Swift Blalock =

American librarian and human rights activist

- Patricia Swift Blalock was instrumental in desegregating the Selma library in 1963.
- Born: May 9, 1914; Gadsden, Alabama, U.S.
- Died: September 7, 2011 (aged 97); Birmingham, Alabama, U.S.
- Education: University of Chicago
- Occupations: librarian, social worker, civil rights activist

Patricia Swift Blalock (May 9, 1914 – September 7, 2011) was an American librarian, social worker, and civil rights activist born in Gadsden, Alabama.

Blalock graduated from the University of Montevallo and studied social work at the University of Chicago. She returned to Alabama and worked for the State Department of Education and Rehabilitation, where she helped establish clinics for children with birth defects and other illnesses. She was director of the Selma-Dallas County Public library for 27 years, where she was instrumental in integrating the institution during the 1960s, and retired in 1988.

== Early life ==
Patricia Blalock was born on May 9, 1914, in Gadsden, Alabama. She had two siblings, a sister, Irene, and a brother, James. Her parents were "racially moderates," and more liberal than most families in her area. Her grandfather was one of the first members of the Populist Party in the area and had taught her "not to fear blacks." She attended the University of Montevallo in Montevallo, Alabama, and received a master's degree in social work from the University of Chicago. In 1937, she moved to Selma, Alabama, where she became the district supervisor of the State Crippled Children's Services and oversaw the work of the agency in 28 counties. Blalock got married and had a daughter in 1946, after which she retired from social work.

== Desegregating the Dallas County Public Library in Selma ==
In 1951, "Miss Betty" asked Blalock to work in the Dallas County Public Library in Selma, Alabama, on a part-time basis. Blalock began working as an assistant for the library, a position she held for nearly ten years. When the library director became ill, Blalock became temporary director. The library board then asked her to become the permanent director when it was clear that the current director would not be able to continue. Blalock was apprehensive at first because she did not have a library degree but was, instead, a social worker. The board expressed their faith in her and asked that she take the position which she assumed in 1963.

At the time, there was only one library in Selma. The Selma Library began in 1904 with a $10,000 grant from Andrew Carnegie, who wanted to provide libraries to small communities. Unlike other segregated southern communities which provided a branch for black patrons, Selma's minority population was served through the back door of the library by the library maid.

At the time Blalock assumed her official role as the director, Selma was being informally, but influentially, run by the White Citizens' Council. Created in 1955 in response to the Supreme Court's Brown v. Board of Education, the White Citizen's Council sought to keep the status quo of white supremacy in city life and community affairs. Two influential ex officio members of the library board who attended board meetings regularly were Mayor Chris Heinz and Judge Bernard Reynolds, both leaders in the Citizen's Council. Both orthodox segregationists, Heinz and Reynolds wanted to protect Selma's way of life from people who they considered "outside agitators."

Blalock, upon becoming library director, immediately pushed for desegregation of the library with the library board. This was a difficult task, especially during the political climate of the 1960s, but Blalock was persistent. She personally visited each board member in order to try to convince them that desegregation was inevitable. Blalock had used recent integration orders by the federal government in Montgomery and protests in Birmingham as examples of trouble the people of Selma could expect. She argued that Selma could take control of its own integration process rather than have outsiders do it for them.

By May 1963, Blalock had become more urgent in her appeals. She told Board that there was a push to protest the library's segregation policies and that she was unsure if she would even be able to open the library on Monday without some sort of desegregation plan in place. The Board agreed to meet at Blalock's home that morning to work out a plan.

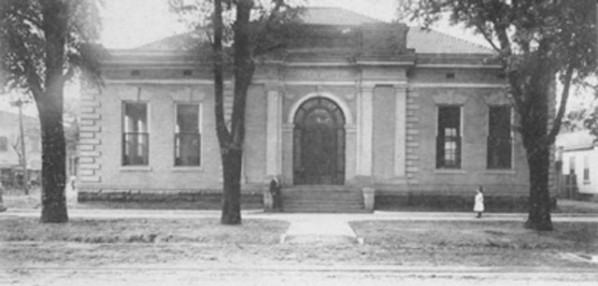
The original Selma Public Library which was built with a Carnegie library grant.

The desegregation plan that was developed for the Selma-Dallas County Library was not ideal to Blalock, but it did accomplish the goal she so eagerly sought. It was decided that the library would remain closed for one week, from May 13 to May 19. Following that period, it would reopen using "vertical integration" techniques; all of the chairs in the library would be removed in order to keep black and white patrons from sitting together. In addition, the library's desegregation would not be publicly announced and all library card applicants would be required to provide two references, a negligible impediment in the mind of Blalock.

On May 20, 1963, the library reopened, fully desegregated, without much fanfare. Library visitors who found the lack of chairs unusual were told that the chairs were in the basement being stored temporarily. Black patrons, unaware of the recent change, were slow to use the library at first; by November, they were becoming more common. Blalock slowly began taking the chairs out of storage and moved them back to the library. With the library desegregated, Blalock also pushed for integration of the library staff. Annie Molette, the library maid who quietly used her position to provide library services to the community's blacks through the back door, was told by Blalock that the library would be hiring a new maid. Molette was then told that she was being hired as Selma's first African-American library assistant.

Desegregation of the library was not universally accepted by Selma's white community; the skills Blalock learned as a social worker became indispensable in her service to all members of the community in order to keep the city calm on the issue. An anecdote tells of a white library patron who, upon seeing African-American patrons using the library, tore up his library card in anger and vowed never to return. Two weeks later when the man returned to check out a book, he was met by Blalock who had earlier taken the time to tape back together the pieces of his card and save it in case he did return.

== Later life and recognition ==
In 1988, Blalock retired from her role as director of the Selma-Dallas County Public Library. In 1992, Blalock was recognized by the Alabama Library Association with its Distinguished Service Award. This award recognizes an individual who has made a significant contribution towards the development of library services in the State of Alabama.

Blalock dedicated much of her later life to the development of her community in other spheres, serving two terms as a director of the Selma and Dallas County Chamber of Commerce, chairing the Tale Telling Association, serving two terms as vice president of the Selma and Dallas Tourism Council, and directing and chairing the Community Concern Association in Selma. Blalock was a longtime director and membership chairman of the Community Concert Association in Selma and also helped found the Performing Arts Center in Selma.

She spent the last years of her life in Birmingham, Alabama, surrounded by her two grandchildren and five great-grandchildren, along with a large extended family. In 2000, she was recognized by the International Library Science Honor Society who designated her Librarian of the Year for Exceptional Leadership in Librarianship. Her daughter, Irene Blalock, is a noted librarian as well and recently retired as the Director of the Birmingham Public Library.
