= Swift Boat =

Swift Boat or swift boat may refer to:

- Patrol Craft Fast, known as "Swift Boats", boats operated by the United States Navy during the Vietnam War
  - Swift Boat Veterans for Truth, former name of the political group Swift Vets and POWs for Truth
- Flyboat (also called swift boat), a light and fast passenger boat

== See also ==
- Swiftboating, political jargon for a particular form of character assassination as a smear tactic
