= Swift, Missouri =

Ghost town in Pemiscot County, Missouri

Coordinates: 36°19′45″N 89°45′15″W

Swift is an extinct town in Pemiscot County, in the U.S. state of Missouri. The GNIS classifies it as a populated place.

A variant name was "Swifton". A post office called Swifton was established in 1914, the name was changed to Swift in 1926, and the post office closed in 1943. The community has the name of one Mr. Swift, the original owner of the town site.
