= Edna P. Lowe Swift =

Edna Patricia Lowe Swift (born September 30, 1949) was the first Black graduate of Agnes Scott College, earning a Bachelor's of Arts in Spanish in 1971. She went on to serve as an educator in the Atlanta Public Schools system for 28 years. Swift's legacy at Agnes Scott has since been recognized through campus honors, including a commemorative bench, a student lounge, and an annual award bearing her name.

== Early life ==
Swift was raised in Atlanta, Georgia, alongside her sister, by their mother and grandparents. She attended E.R. Carter Elementary School, where she was first introduced to Spanish in the fourth grade. Her early exposure to the language sparked a lasting interest, which she continued to pursue through the seventh grade. She graduated from Booker T. Washington High School in 1967.

== Education ==
In 1967, Swift enrolled at Agnes Scott College as a day student. She completed a Bachelor of Arts in Spanish in 1971. Although Agnes Scott admitted its first Black student, Gay Johnson McDougall, in 1965, McDougall transferred after two years, citing racial tensions on campus. In contrast, Swift later shared that she did not encounter open hostility or verbal attacks during her time at the college. However, she described feeling isolated and lonely, finding encouragement and support from Black campus staff.

As part of her scholarship, Swift worked on campus as a clerk-aide to fulfill her work-study requirement. She studied abroad in Mexico and served on the campus’ judicial council. She also founded Agnes Scott's Black student organization, Witkaze, and pledged Delta Sigma Theta sorority along with Belita Stafford Walker (Class of 1972), the college’s second Black graduate.

Despite being the first Black graduate from Agnes Scott, this milestone was not formally recognized by the institution at the time.

== Career ==
=== Teaching career ===
Swift became a Spanish teacher at Southside Comprehensive High School (now Maynard Holbrook Jackson High School) in Atlanta, where she taught for 28 years. Her teaching style incorporated cultural immersion, including student performances of Spanish-language renditions of songs such as Corazón Romántico, El Puro Dolor, and Spanish versions of Toni Braxton’s "Un-Break My Heart" and "Breathe Again".

Through a scholarship from the Georgia State Department of Education, Swift pursued graduate studies in Spain, earning a master's degree in Spanish Language and Culture from the University of Salamanca. She retired from teaching in 2005.

=== Post-retirement ===
After the death of her husband in 2006, Swift remained active through various social and community activities. She reconnected with Agnes Scott College and Delta Sigma Theta Sorority, participated in high school reunions, joined dance and fitness groups, and managed a rental property.

== Personal life ==
Swift married Alfred Swift shortly after graduating from Agnes Scott College. They had three children: two daughters and a son. Her eldest daughter, Shanika Dawn Swift, graduated from Agnes Scott in 1993 with a degree in mathematics. In 2018, her granddaughter, Tori Cervantes, also graduated from Agnes Scott, majoring in Spanish like her grandmother.

== Honors ==
In 2021, Agnes Scott College commemorated the 50th anniversary of Swift’s graduation with a bench and plaque placed in her honor at the campus’s Woodruff Quadrangle. In subsequent years, Swift has participated as a guest speaker at events held by the college.

A lounge on campus has been named in her honor, and the institution established the Edna Lowe Swift Trailblazer Award, presented annually during the Mosaic Awards Banquet. The award recognizes faculty or staff members who demonstrate a commitment to building a more inclusive community.
