= Arthur Swift (footballer) =

English footballer

Personal information
- Date of birth: 1892
- Place of birth: Hartlepool, England
- Date of death: 1954 (aged 61–62)
- Position: Forward

Senior career*
Years	Team	Apps	(Gls)
1914–1920	West Bromwich Albion		
1920–1921	Crystal Palace	1	(0)
- * Club domestic league appearances and goals

Arthur Swift (1892–1954) was an English professional footballer who played in the Football League as a forward for Crystal Palace and West Bromwich Albion.

== Career ==
Swift was born in Hartlepool, England in 1892. He signed for West Bromwich Albion in 1913 and made his debut in a home 1–0 win against Preston North End on 3 January 2014. Between then and 1920, he made 28 appearances in all competitions scoring 11 times.

It is known that he served in World War I, which would have limited his appearances for the club.

In 1920, Swift signed for Crystal Palace, then playing in the Football League Third Division in its inaugural season. However, after only one league appearance, in a 0–3 away defeat to Queens Park Rangers in December 1920, Swift retired from playing in 1921 to take up coaching duties.

== Personal life ==
Swift died in 1954, aged 61 or 62.
