= Charles Swift (disambiguation) =

Charles Swift (born 1961) is an American attorney and former Navy officer

Charles Swift may also refer to:

- Charles F. Swift (1825–1903), American politician and newspaper editor
- Charles M. Swift (1854–1929), American businessman
- Charles Thomas Swift (1846–1890), American businessman
- Charles Thomas Swift, birth name of Tom Swift (politician) (born 1944), American politician in Pennsylvania
- Charlie Swift (sportscaster) (died 1977), American sportscaster

== See also ==
- Bill Swift (born 1961 as William Charles Swift), American baseball player
- Charles Lillicrap (1887–1966; middle name Swift), British naval architect
- Justin Swift (born 1975; middle name Charles), American former football player
