= Richard Swift =

Richard Swift may refer to:

- Richard Swift (composer) (1927–2003), American composer and music theorist
- Richard Swift (politician) (1811–1872), member of the UK Parliament for Sligo County
- Richard Swift (musician) (1977–2018), American singer-songwriter
- Richard Swift, 17th-century Ambassador of the Kingdom of England to Russia
- Shade (character) or Richard Swift, a DC Comics villain
