= Francis Swift =

Dean of Clonmacnoise from 1885 to 1892

Francis Henry Swift (1827-1892) was Dean of Clonmacnoise from 1885 to 1892.

Dowse was born in County Westmeath and educated at Trinity College, Dublin (BA in mathematics 1851, MA 1865) and ordained in 1856. After a curacy in Mullingar he held incumbencies at Clonfad and Castletown.He spent his whole career at Mullingar (curate from 1855 to 1865; incumbent thereafter) before his appointment to the deanery.
