= Heman Swift =

American judge (1733–1814)

Heman Swift (October 14, 1733 – November 12, 1814) was a soldier in the American Revolutionary War, known as General Washington's Colonel. He was a Colonel in the Connecticut State Regiment from July to December 1776, the 7th Connecticut Regiment from January 1777 to January 1781 and the 2nd Connecticut Regiment from January 1781 to June 1783. He was brevetted Brigadier-General on September 30, 1783 and was discharged in December 1783. He was an Original Member of the Connecticut Society of the Cincinnati.

He was an associate justice of the Connecticut Supreme Court of Errors (now known as the Connecticut Supreme Court) from 1790 to 1802.

Gen. Heman Swift, born in Wareham. Plymouth county, Mass., became an early settler of Cornwall, Litchfield county. Conn History records him as having married four wives, one of which, as Mrs. Sarah Jay) was the grandmother of Ruth Robinson Calhoun, while his daughter, Dennis Swift, by another wife, became the mother of Hon. Frederick Kellogg, the husband of Ruth R. Calhoun. In relation to General Swift we find the following beautiful tribute to his memory, on pp. 406 and 407, third volume of "Travels in New England and New York," by Timothy Dwight, S. T. D., LL.D., late president of Yale College, 1822: "Cornwall is particularly distinguished for being the residence of Hon. Maj.-Gen. Heman Swift. This gentleman was born in Wareham, in the county of Plymouth, Mass. The only education which he received was that of a parochial school. Soon after his removal to Connecticut, when a young man, he was chosen a representative to the Legislature. In the American army he rose to the rank of brigadier-general. After the Revolutionary war was ended he was elected a member of the council. He resigned his seat at this board in 1802. For many years he was judge of the court of common pleas, for the county of Litchfield. He was distinguished for native strength of mind, regularly directed to practical and useful objects, and he solicitously sought improvement from the sources which were within his reach. In this manner he acquired extensively that knowledge which fits a man to be serviceable to his fellowmen. His affections were soft and gentle, his conversation mild, and unassuming. But his conceptions were bold and masculine, and his disposition invincibly firm. When he was once assured of his duty, nothing could move him from his purpose. Hence he possessed an independence of mind, which all men reverenced, and all bad men dreaded. As an officer, though distitute of the brilliancy so coveted in that character, he was highly respected by his fellow officers, and loved by the soldiers, every one of whom approached him with a certainty of being justly and kindly treated. His bravery was that of Putnam, tempered with consummate prudence. As a judge, probably no man ever held a more equal balance. As a councillor, he was wise, he was humble, sincere, upright, generous, charitable, and eminently pious. The great inquiry of his life was, what was his duty? and his great purpose, to do it." The biographer of General Swift relates of him that "he was a personal friend of General Washington, by whom he was held in high esteem, and who once paid him a visit at his home in Cornwall." He was an officer in the old French and Indian wars, serving likewise through the war of the Revolution. The archives of the state of Connecticut, under the official seal of the Adjutant-General Andrew H. Embler, relate that "General Heman Swift, of Cornwall, commanded the Seventh regiment Connecticut line, formation of 1777-1781, and the Second regiment Connecticut line, formation of 1781-1783."
