= David Swift (author) =

English writer, and historian

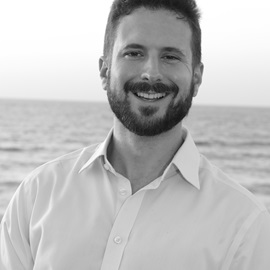
- Swift in 2022
- Born: 1987 (age 38–39); England
- Education: Girton College, University of Cambridge
- Occupations: Writer, historian
- Writing career
- Notable works: For Class and Country (2017); A Left for Itself (2019); The Identity Myth (2022); Scouse Republic (2025)

David Swift (born 1987) is an English writer and historian.

Swift studied history at Girton College, University of Cambridge.

== Works ==
- For Class and Country: the Patriotic Left and the First World War (2017)
- A Left for Itself: Left-wing Hobbyists and Performative Radicalism (2019)
- The Identity Myth: Why We Need to Embrace our Differences to Beat Inequality (2022)
- Scouse Republic: An Alternative History of Liverpool (2025)

Swift's early work focused on left-wing activism and on the importance of different identities, such as class, race and gender, in twentieth-century British history. His first book, a history of the British Left during the First World War, was described by reviewer Prof Peter Stansky as ‘an important contribution to the ever-fascinating subject of the history of the British left [and] the development of the Labour party’.

His second book, A Left for Itself, was the first analysis of 'political hobbyism' in the UK, and focused on what he termed 'performative radicalism' in the era of the internet and social media. It was heralded as a definitive analysis of the failure of Jeremy Corbyn's Labour party at the 2019 United Kingdom general election.

In 2022 Swift published his third book, The Identity Myth, which interrogated common understandings of different 'identities' such as class, race, gender, and generation. It was a Next Big Idea Club finalist for 2022.

Swift's most recent book, 2025's Scouse Republic, focused on the history of his home city of Liverpool, taking in the economic, social, political, and cultural transformation of the city over the past five centuries. It was widely reviewed, including in The Guardian, the New Statesman, the Literary Review, the Irish Independent, and The Irish Times.

He has written for a variety of newspapers and periodicals including the New Statesman, Tribune, The Times, The Independent and UnHerd.
