= Jonathan Swift (disambiguation) =

Jonathan Swift (1667–1745), was an Anglo-Irish satirist and cleric.

Jonathan Swift may also refer to:

- Jonathan Swift (British Army officer)
- Jonathan Swift (judge) (born 1964), British High Court judge.
- Blue Streak (Jonathan Swift), Marvel Comics character.
- HSC Jonathan Swift, high-speed ferry owned and operated by Baleària.
