= William Romaine Paterson =

Glasgow-based writer

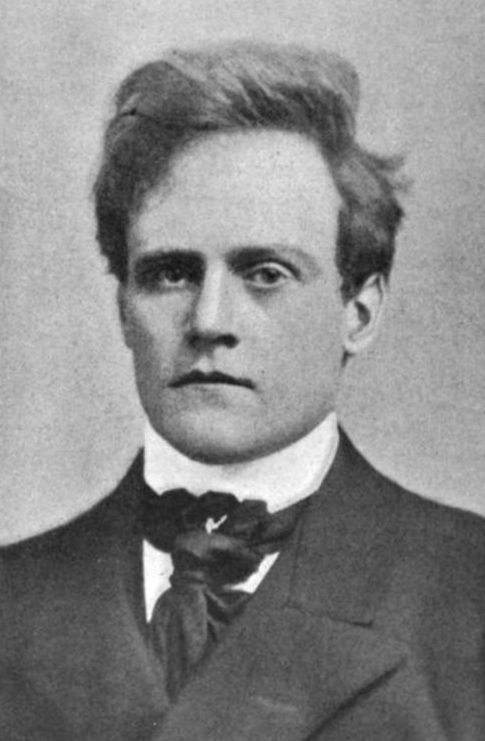
- In The Bookman, November 1899
- Born: 29 July 1871; Glasgow, Scotland
- Died: 3 December 1941 (aged 70); Moustiers-Sainte-Marie, France
- Education: University of Glasgow
- Occupation: Writer

William Romaine Paterson (29 July 1871 – 3 December 1941) was a Scottish, Glasgow-based writer often using the pen name Benjamin Swift. He wrote novels, poems, essays, and short stories.

== Biographical details ==
William Romaine Paterson was born in Glasgow on 29 July 1871. He lived at 25 University Gardens near the University of Glasgow.

He received the MA degree from the University of Glasgow in 1894.

His mother was Marion Paterson. His father was Robert Paterson. His sister, Catherine Paterson, gifted part his archive to University of Glasgow Special Collections. He also had a brother, James Venn Paterson, and a nephew, James Paterson, Doctor of Laws.

He was interned in Vichy France during World War II. He died in Moustiers-Sainte-Marie on 3 December 1941. (Note: Other sources list a death year of 1937 and 1942.)

== Works ==
- Nancy Noon, 1896
- The Tormentor, 1897
- The Destroyer, 1898
- Dartnell: A Bizarre Incident, 1900
- Nude Souls, a novel, 1900
- The Eternal Conflict, an essay, 1901, 228pp.
- Ludus amoris, reprinted as The Game of Love, 1902
- In Piccadilly, 1903
- Gossip, 1905
- Life's questionings: A book of experience, a collection of author's aphorisms and apothegms 1905
- The Nemesis Of Nations: Studies In History, 1907
  - From the preface: "...a humble attempt is made to utilise part of the expert evidence for the purpose of forming some opinions on the life and death of nations." Chapters: I. Introduction, II. Hindustan, III. Babylon, IV. Greece, V. Rome.
- The Death Man, 1908
- The Lady of the Night, 1913
- What Lies Beneath, 1917
- Siren City, 1923
- The Old Dance Master, 1923
- Problems of Destiny, an essay, 1935
