= John Swift (general) =

United States Army general

Brigadier General John Swift
- Born: June 17, 1761; Kent, Connecticut Colony
- Died: July 12, 1814 (aged 53); Queenston, Upper Canada
- Burial place: Gen. John Swift Memorial Cemetery; Palmyra, New York; 43.065°N 77.234°W
- Military career
- Allegiance: Thirteen Colonies; United States of America
- Branch: Continental Army; United States Volunteers
- Rank: Brigadier general

John Swift (June 17, 1761 – July 12, 1814) was an American military officer during the Revolutionary War and the War of 1812. He founded the town of Palmyra, New York.

== Early life ==
Swift was born on June 17, 1761, in Kent, in what was then the Connecticut Colony. His parents were Elisha Swift and the former Mary Ransom; one of his brothers, born two years later, was Philetus Swift, who eventually became a prominent legislator in New York State.

== Revolution ==
Swift enlisted in the Continental Army and served as a private in Elmore's Regiment (an unnumbered regiment in the Connecticut Line) under Captain Lathrop Allen.

== Pennamite Wars ==
Swift was among the Connecticuters who attempted to settle in the Wyoming Valley in northeastern Pennsylvania, sparking the Second Pennamite War. When the Pennsylvania legislature decided the land claims in favor of the Pennsylvania Mennonites, Swift decamped for Western New York (even though the Connecticut settlers were eventually granted Pennsylvania residency).

== Palmyra ==
In the winter of 1788–89, with the Wyoming Valley situation not going in the Connecticuters' favor, John Swift and John Jenkins purchased a large tract within the Phelps and Gorham Purchase in what is now Wayne County, New York, with the intent of helping their fellow Connecticuters settle there instead. When Swift set up residence near Ganargua Creek in 1790 (after buying out Jenkins), the area was named "Swift's Landing". It later was named "Tolland" before being renamed "Palmyra" at the first town meeting in 1796.

== Life in Palmyra ==
Swift had married Rhoda Sawyer on March 6, 1784; her brother was the one who proposed the name "Palmyra" in 1796. After Rhoda's death, Swift later married Hepsibah Treat Davidson. He had four children by his first wife and three more by his second.

== War of 1812 ==
Swift re-entered military service when the War of 1812 broke out, as a member of the New York Volunteers, and was assigned the rank of brigadier general. In July 1814 (between the Battle of Chippawa and the Battle of Lundy's Lane), Swift's unit was on the Canadian side of the Niagara River as the American forces attempted to invade Upper Canada. On July 12, Swift led a charge to take Fort George, near modern-day Niagara-on-the-Lake. After capturing a picket post, Swift was killed by one of the defenders, whose weapons he had not confiscated. He was initially buried there, but a group of Palmyrans repatriated his remains to the cemetery that today bears his name, the General John Swift Memorial Cemetery.
