= Cladomphalus =

Scientific classification
- Domain: Eukaryota
- (unranked): SAR
- (unranked): Heterokonta
- Phylum: Ochrophyta
- Class: Bacillariophyceae
- Subclass: incertae sedis
- Genus: Cladomphalus J.W.Bailey, 1894

Species
- Cladomphalus elegans J.W. Bailey in Bailey Collection (uncertain)

Genus of single-celled organisms

Cladomphalus is a genus of diatoms of uncertain affinity.
