= Cladomphalus elegans =

Scientific classification
- Domain: Eukaryota
- (unranked): SAR
- (unranked): Heterokonta
- Phylum: Ochrophyta
- Class: Bacillariophyceae
- Subclass: incertae sedis
- Genus: Cladomphalus
- Species: C. elegans

Binomial name
- Cladomphalus elegans J.W.Bailey, 1894 in Bailey Collection

Species of single-celled organism

Cladomphalus elegans is a species of diatom of uncertain affinity. It is found in Jacob Whitman Bailey's collection on a slide with the inscription "Monterey, California; lower stratum".
