= USS Maury =

USS or USNS Maury may refer to the following ships, named for Commodore Matthew Fontaine Maury:

- USS Commodore Maury (SP-656), was a fishing steamer that served in a non-commissioned status in the 5th Naval District during World War I
- USS Maury (DD-100) was a Wickes-class destroyer during World War I
- USS Maury (DD-401) was a Gridley-class destroyer during World War II
- USS Maury (AGS-16) ex-Renate was an Artemis-class attack cargo ship during World War II and a survey ship from 1946 until stricken in 1969
- USNS Maury (T-AGS-39), an oceanographic survey ship was built in 1989 and struck in 1994 then turned over to the Maritime Administration and renamed Golden Bear
- USNS Maury (T-AGS-66), is a Pathfinder-class survey ship launched 2013 and renamed Marie Tharp in 2023
