= Lemuel Punderson =

American engraver (1824–1910)

- Born: Lemuel Swift Punderson; October 20, 1824
- Died: October 11, 1910 (aged 85)
- Occupations: Engraver; printer
- Spouse: Mary Fuller (died 1904)
- Children: 2

Lemuel Swift Punderson (October 20, 1824 – October 11, 1910) was an engraver and printer in the United States.

== Family ==
Members of the Punderson family were among New Haven's earliest settlers. John Punderson was recorded as the last living in the city in 1904.

== Career ==
Punderson worked in New York City and then New Haven, Connecticut. Yale University has a collection of his papers. He did engravings from daguerreotype photographs.

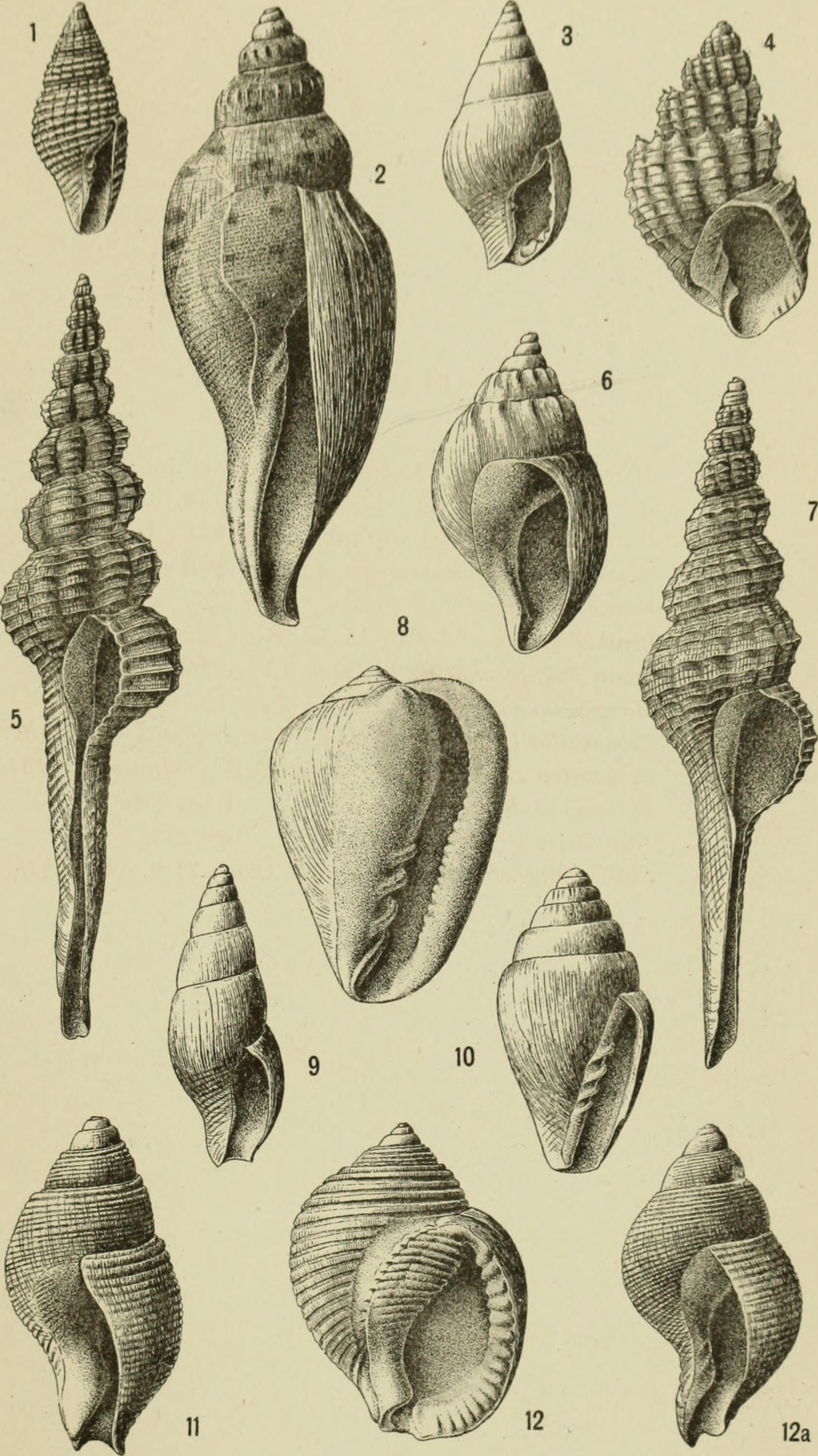
Lithograph by L. S. Punderson & Son in the Bulletin of the Museum of Comparative Zoology at Harvard College

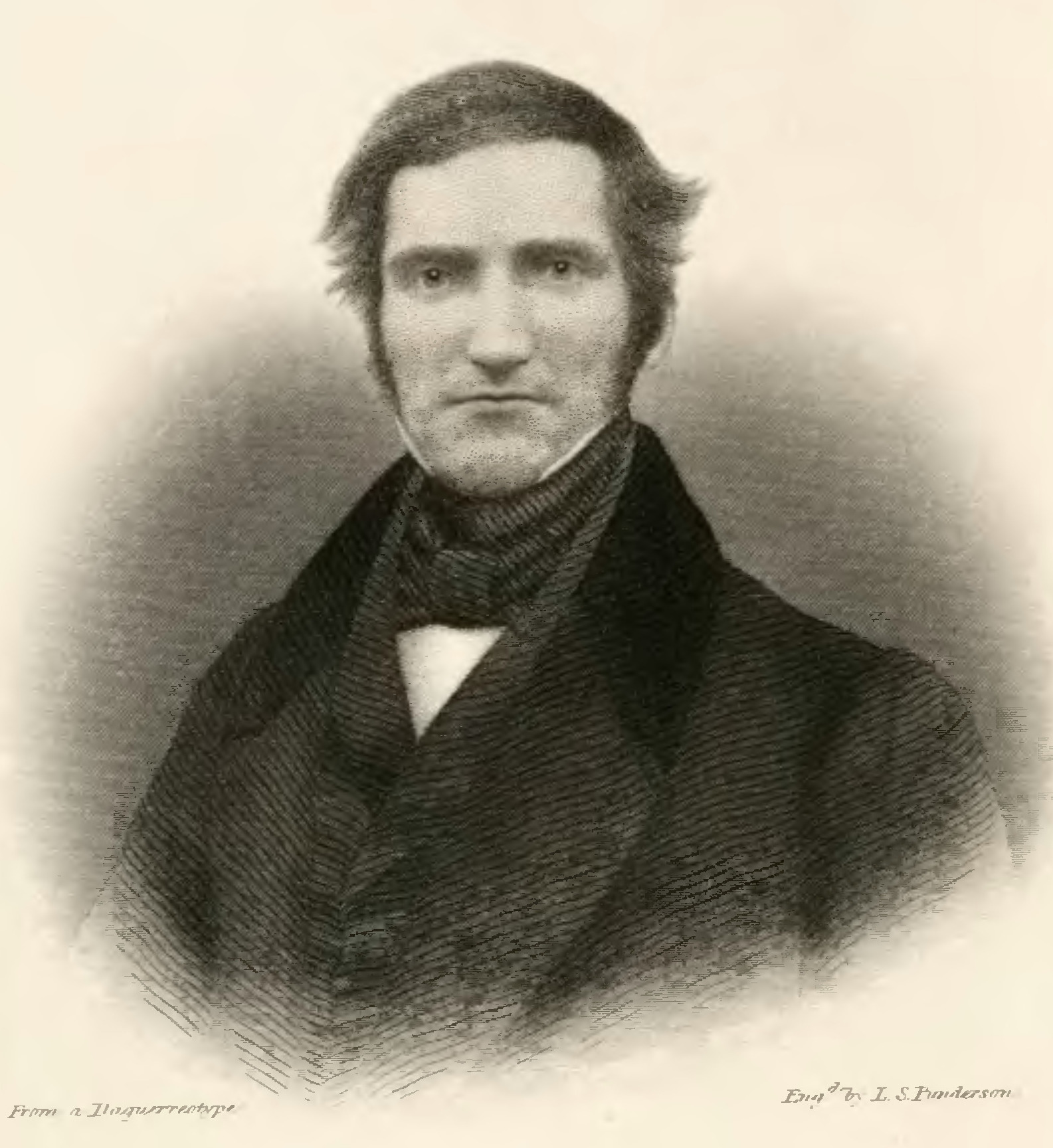
Engraving of Asahel Grant by Punderson from a daguerreotype

The book on the history and antiquities of New Haven he and John Warner Barber published in 1856 included an engraving of John Davenport. He also made an engraving of Yale College campus in New Haven showing trees and buildings on the campus. Punderson made an 1855 engraving of Matthew Fontaine Maury.

== Personal life ==
Punderson married Mary L. Fuller, daughter of Benjamin Fuller, of Wilbraham, Massachusetts. They had two sons, Samuel F. and Henry F. His wife died in 1904.

Punderson died in Springfield, Massachusetts, and is buried at Grove Street Cemetery in New Haven.

== Bibliography ==
- History and antiquities of New Haven, Conn., from its earliest settlement to the present time. With biographical sketches and statistical information of the public institutions, &c., &c. by L.S. Punderson and John Warner Barber, New Haven (1856)
