= Matthew Fontaine Maury =

American oceanographer and naval officer (1806–1873)

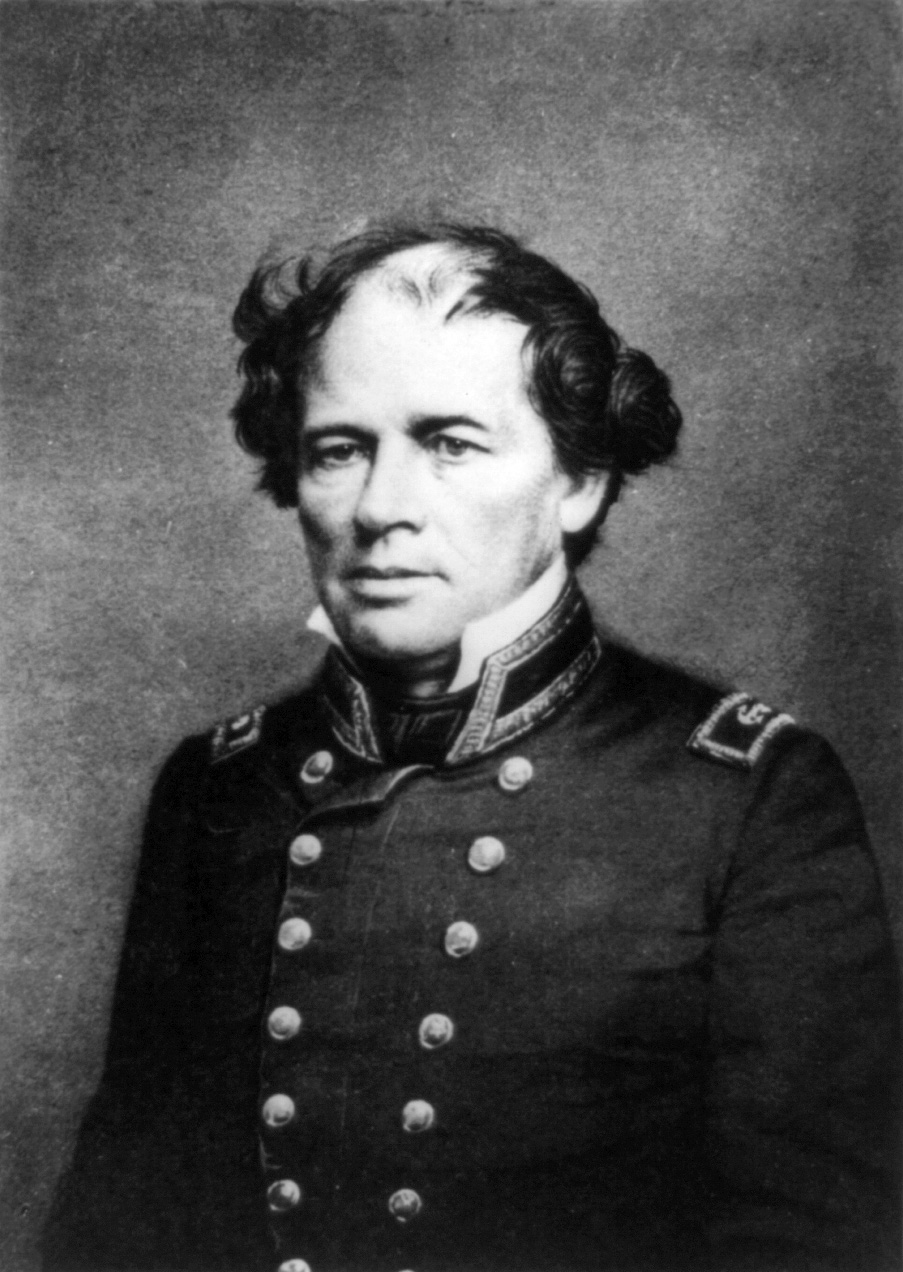
- as a U.S. Navy lieutenant in 1853
- Born: January 14, 1806; Spotsylvania County, Virginia, U.S.
- Died: February 1, 1873 (aged 67); Lexington, Virginia, U.S.
- Resting place: Hollywood Cemetery
- Occupations: Oceanographer, naval officer, educator, author
- Military career
- Allegiance: United States; Confederate States
- Branch: United States Navy; Confederate States Navy
- Service years: 1825–1861 (USN); 1861–1865 (CSN)
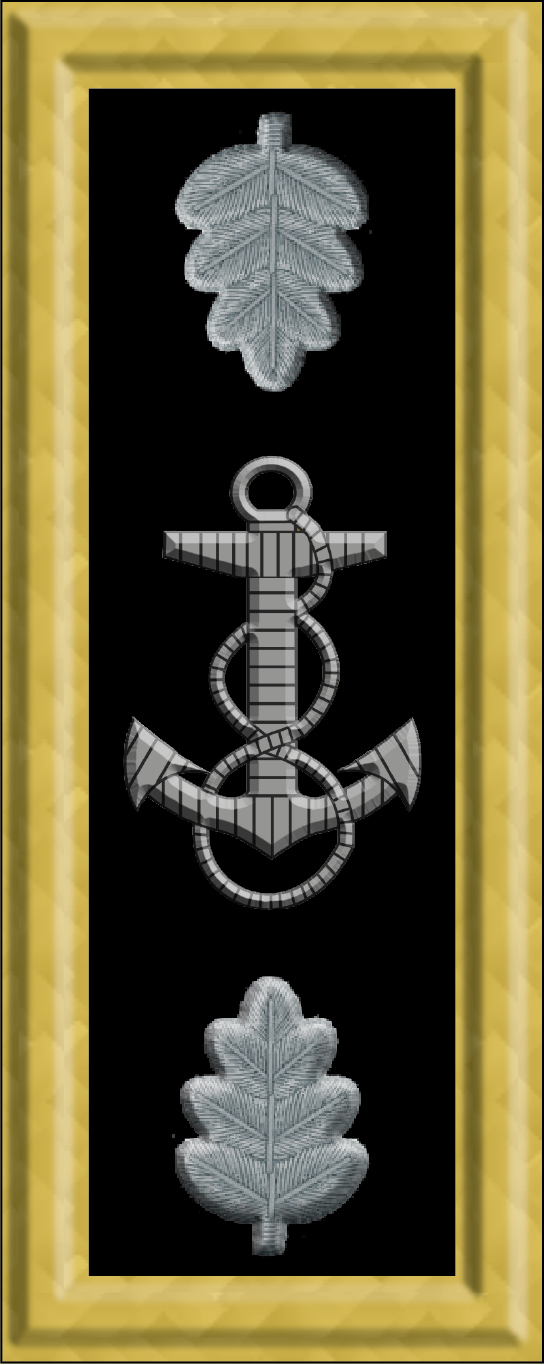
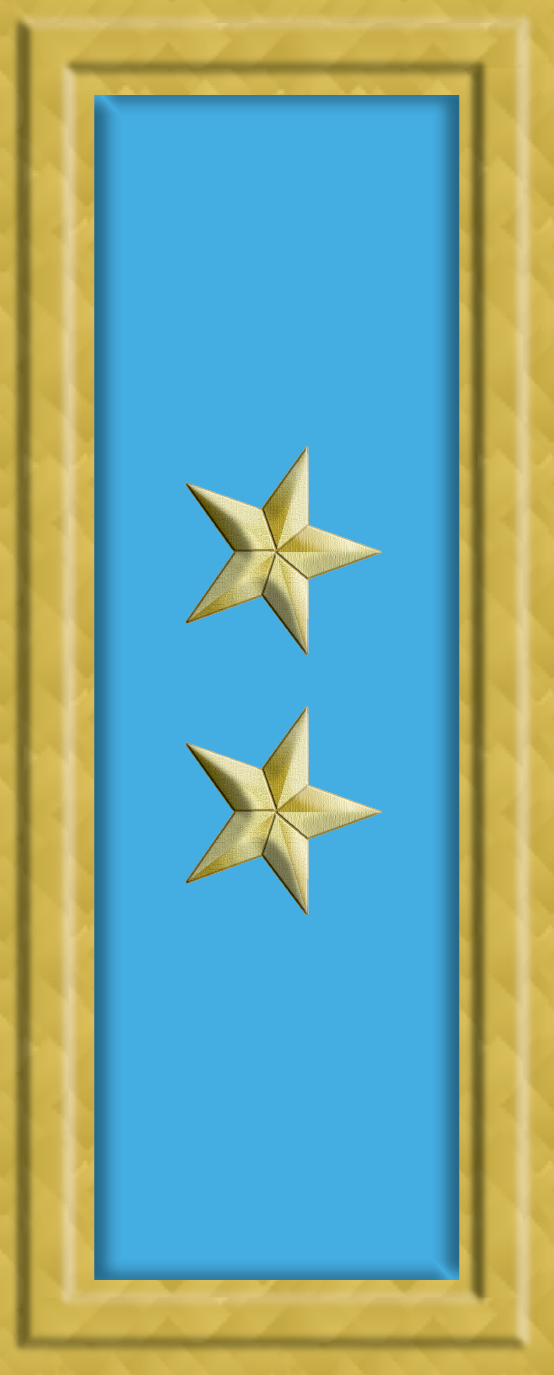
- Rank: Commander (USN) Commander (CSN)

Matthew Fontaine Maury (January 14, 1806 – February 1, 1873) was an American oceanographer and naval officer, serving the United States and then joining the Confederacy during the American Civil War.

He was nicknamed "Pathfinder of the Seas" and is considered a founder of modern oceanography. He wrote extensively on the subject, and his book, The Physical Geography of the Sea (1855), was the first comprehensive work on oceanography to be published.

In 1825, at 19, Maury obtained, through U.S. Representative Sam Houston, a midshipman's warrant in the United States Navy. As a midshipman on board the frigate USS Brandywine, he almost immediately began to study the seas and record methods of navigation. When a leg injury left him unfit for sea duty, Maury devoted his time to studying navigation, meteorology, winds, and currents.

He became Superintendent of the Depot of Charts and Instruments, later renamed the United States Naval Observatory, in 1844. There, Maury studied thousands of ships' logs and charts. He published the Wind and Current Chart of the North Atlantic, which showed sailors how to utilize the ocean's currents and winds to their advantage, thereby drastically reducing the length of ocean voyages. Maury's uniform system of recording oceanographic data was adopted by navies and merchant marines worldwide and was used to develop charts for all the major trade routes.

With the outbreak of the American Civil War, Maury, a Virginian, resigned his commission as a U.S. Navy commander and joined the Confederacy. He spent the war in the Southern United States, and Great Britain and France as a Confederate envoy. He helped the Confederacy acquire a ship, CSS Georgia, while trying to convince several European powers to intervene on behalf of the Confederacy. Following the war, Maury was eventually pardoned; he accepted a teaching position at the Virginia Military Institute in Lexington, Virginia.

He died at the institute in 1873 after completing an exhausting state-to-state lecture tour on national and international weather forecasting. He had also completed his book, Geological Survey of Virginia, and a new series on geography for young people.

== Early life and career ==
Maury was a descendant of the Maury family, a prominent Virginia family of Huguenot ancestry that can be traced back to 15th-century France. His grandfather (the Reverend James Maury) was an inspiring teacher to a future U.S. president, Thomas Jefferson. Maury also had Dutch-American ancestry from the Minor family of early Virginia.

He was born in 1806 in Spotsylvania County, Virginia, near Fredericksburg; his parents were Richard Maury and Diane Minor Maury. The family moved to Franklin, Tennessee when he was five. He wanted to emulate the naval career of his older brother, Flag Lieutenant John Minor Maury, an officer in the U.S. Navy, who caught yellow fever after fighting pirates. As a result of John's painful death, Matthew's father, Richard, forbade him from joining the Navy. Maury strongly considered attending West Point to get a better education than the Navy could offer. Instead, he obtained a naval appointment through the influence of Tennessee Representative Sam Houston, a family friend, in 1825, at the age of 19, with the rank of acting midshipman.

=== First voyage: France, England, & Mediterranean, 1825-1826 ===
Maury's first assignment was on the newly built frigate Brandywine, which was to carry the elderly Marquis de Lafayette home to France following his famous 1824 visit to the United States. Brandywine left from the Potomac River on September 9, 1825, and soon proved to be a fast sailer, making 11 knots as she left Chesapeake Bay and entered the Atlantic. They reached France on October 4, and the Marquis went ashore at Le Havre. They then sailed to Cowes on the Isle of Wight, where the ship was caulked. Maury was eager to learn as much as possible about navigation, and during his time ashore was able to buy a copy of Norie's Epitome of Practical Navigation. They next sailed for the Mediterranean, reaching Gibraltar on November 2, where there was again shore leave. Maury wished to learn Spanish, and bought a Spanish dictionary and a Spanish textbook of navigation. They then left for Port Mahon on Minorca, the winter American naval rendezvous. Brandywine then returned to the United States, leaving on February 26, 1826, and arriving off Sandy Hook on April 17. Once back in New York, Maury received his warrant confirming his position as midshipman.

=== Second Voyage: around the world, 1826-1830 ===
After taking the opportunity to visit relatives, Maury returned to New York on June 1, 1826 to rejoin Brandywine. They were to sail in company with the newly built sloop of war USS Vincennes for duty in the Pacific. They left in August headed for Rio de Janeiro. As they sailed into the South Atlantic, Maury was able to see the constellations of the southern skies and the Magellanic Clouds for the first time. They arrived in Rio on October 28. After some difficulties with the authorities caused by the ongoing war between Brazil and Argentina, they left on November 18, and as they sailed south, the ships were prepared for the stormy passage around Cape Horn, which took 17 days. On December 26, the two ships anchored in Valparaíso where they liaised with other American ships, as well as HMS Cambridge of the Royal Navy, and carried out maintenance. On January 24, Brandywine and Vincennes, together with the United States and Dolphin, sailed north to Callao, arriving there on February 9.

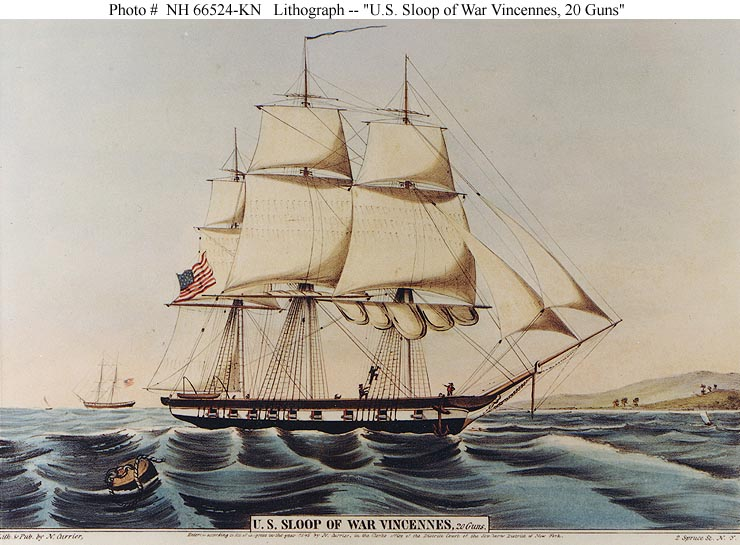
Colour lithograph of the Vincennes, 1845.

On March 9, 1827, Maury received orders to transfer to Vincennes, which was occupied in patrol duties on the west coast of South America from 1827 to 1829. These were unsettled times in the aftermath of the defeat of Spanish colonial rule, and there was a need to provide protection for American shipping in the event of war. During this time Maury continued his own studies, which at this stage included the works of the mathematician Edward Riddle on spherical trigonometry and lunar observations. In June 1829, Vincennes was ordered to sail across the Pacific to Canton. They set sail on July 4. The ship's chaplain was Charles Samuel Stewart, who included Maury on many of the excursions he took on the voyage. Stewart wrote an account of the cruise, which was published in two volumes in 1833.

The first port of call was Nuku Hiva in the Marquesas (then known as the Washington Group). Maury had good reason to be interested in this island, as his brother John Minor had been stranded there for nearly two years during the War of 1812. He made several trips to the island with Stewart, on one of which he was able to meet the old Happa chief who had known his brother. They then sailed to Tahiti, arriving at Papeete on August 17, and then to the Hawaiian Islands. In both Tahiti and Hawaii, William Bolton Finch, the ship's commander, had diplomatic duties, relating to trade, the welfare of Americans in the islands, return of deserters, and settlement of debts. Vincennes then left the Hawaiian Islands heading for China, anchoring off Macao on January 1, 1830. Finch's mission was both diplomatic, dealing with the Chinese authorities, and obtaining information from the many American traders there. Maury was able to visit the merchants' factories outside the walls of Canton, 70 miles upriver from Macao, but not to enter the city. Vincennes then sailed from Macao on January 22, and arrived at Manila Bay in the Philippines on January 29. Maury was able to visit Manila with other officers and chaplain Stewart. On February 9, they left Manila, provisioning in Java, then heading west into the Indian Ocean towards South Africa. During this trip, Maury worked through Euclid and studied the mathematics of Laplace. They arrived in Cape Town on 7 April. The next stop was St Helena, where they visited the tomb of Napoleon. They arrived off the New Jersey shore on June 8, 1830. Vincennes became the first US warship to travel round the world. Maury had been away from the United States for nearly four years, and had learned much of sailing, weather, and navigation, but also seen the importance of practical diplomacy.

Given three months leave, Maury traveled to visit relatives, including his father in Tennessee. Returning via Virginia, he stayed with the Herndon family in Fredericksburg, and renewed his acquaintance with the 19-year-old Ann Hull Herndon. In October 1830, Maury reported to the school for midshipmen in New York where he was to prepare for his examination. He was dissatisfied with the teaching at the school, and requested leave to study on his own. This was granted, and in December he moved to Washington, staying with his cousin Richard B. Maury, who was register of the Navy Department and lived in Georgetown. During this time, Ann came to visit. Maury was summoned to take his examination on March 3, 1831. He passed, but was rated 27th out of a class of 40. This low placement may be explained by the account Maury later wrote of his experience:

He who repeats "by heart" the rules of Bowditch, though he does not understand the mathematical principles involved in one of them, obtains a higher number from the Board than he who, skilled in mathematics, goes up to the blackboard, and drawing his diagram, can demonstrate every problem in navigation.

After passing his examination, Maury returned to Fredericksburg to visit Ann, and they soon became engaged.

=== Third voyage: Pacific, 1831-1834 ===
Maury's next assignment was with the Falmouth, which was scheduled for patrol in the Pacific. He joined the ship on June 11, 1831 as acting sailing master. Being directly responsible for navigation, he wanted to find out about the winds and current he might expect to encounter during the voyage, but to his surprise was unable to find such information. The ship left Sandy Hook on July 5. After calling at Rio de Janeiro, Falmouth headed south towards Cape Horn. On his second rounding of the Horn, Maury, faced with a contrary westerly gale, took the option of a long tack to the south and found more favorable winds. Another ship, HMS Volage, rounding the Cape at about the same time took the inshore passage and was twice blown back before finally managing to beat her way west, taking days longer and sustaining considerable damage in the process. This experience led Maury to write one of his first published works On the Navigation of Cape Horn. As in his previous voyage, Maury visited Valparaiso and Callao. As well as his navigation duties, Maury conducted a number of surveys while on patrol on the coast of South America. His performance was approved sufficiently that he received lieutenant's pay for the latter part of this tour of duty. In November 1833 in Callao, Maury transferred to the Potomac, which was returning to the United States. On March 10, after rounding the Horn, the Potomac encountered strong gales and many icebergs, colliding with one in the fog, but without being seriously damaged. After repairs in Rio de Janeiro, the ship headed home, arriving in Boston on May 24. Granted three months leave, Maury traveled to Fredericksburg, and on July 15, 1834, he and Ann were married.

== Scientific career ==
=== On leave, writing, mining engineer, 1834-1839 ===
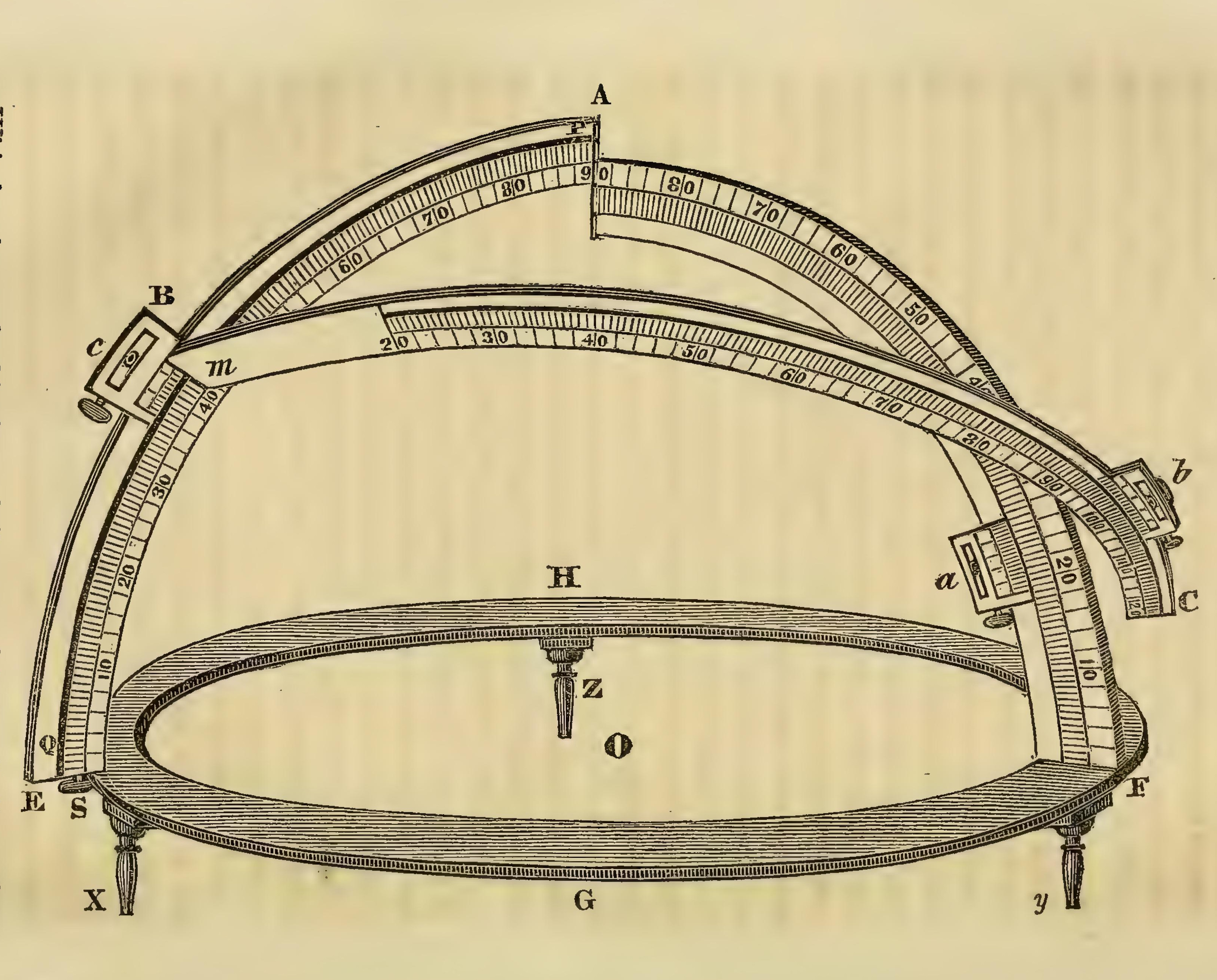
Instrument for finding true lunar distances from Maury's 1834 article

In the same month as the wedding, the American Journal of Science and Arts published Maury's article on the navigation of Cape Horn, as well as an article describing a device he had invented for determining lunar distances. While on the Falmouth, Maury had considered writing a textbook on navigation for the instruction of midshipmen. It would cover both the theoretical and practical aspects of the subject, unlike Bowditch, which relied on learning rules by rote. With no indication of when he might be ordered to a new posting, he set to work on the book, which he completed at the end of April 1835. The manuscript was accepted by the Philadelphia publishers, Key and Biddle. Maury was frustrated by the slow progress of publication, and travelled to Philadelphia to try to speed things up. The book, A New Theoretical and Practical Treatise on Navigation was finally published on 29 April 1836.

Navigation, as the book was generally called, was well-received, with favourable reviews by Edgar Allan Poe as well as a number of naval officers including Maury's former Captain on the Brandywine Francis Gregory who described it as "far superior as a book of instruction than Bowditch". Benjamin Silliman, editor of the American Journal of Science and Arts which had published Maury's articles in 1834, and to whom Maury had dedicated his book, wrote "The estimation in which the work is held among those best qualified to appreciate is worth, may be inferred from the fact that a copy has been ordered to be placed on board all our nautical vessels. It cannot fail to be of important service to the interests of nautical science". It became the standard textbook for midshipmen for many years. Maury was promoted Lieutenant on 10 June 1836.

In the summer of 1836 Maury took employment in a local gold mine. Maury was responsible for a team of fifty men involved in both mining and refining operations. The refining involving amalgamating the ore with mercury to extract the gold, then distillation to separate the gold from the mercury. There was a loss of both metals in this process which Maury thought was excessive, and he invented an alembic that would prevent this loss. This was described in a paper in the American Journal of Arts. On 30 August Professor Silliman visited the mine as part of a tour of the gold-mining region. Maury showed him the mine and its facilities, and was thus able to meet for the first time the man to whom he had dedicated his Navigation.

Maury had seen at first hand the disputes and delays involved in preparation for the United States Exploring Expedition which finally set out in 1838. Frustrated with this, and more generally with what he had seen of the way the navy was managed, he wrote a series of highly critical articles under the pseudonym "Harry Bluff", which appeared in the Richmond Whig and Public Advertiser in August and September of that year. He then composed a series of letters from an equally pseudonymous "Will", to his old messmate Harry. These commented on the issues raised, and were published ion the same paper in December. During the same period, Maury wrote his first article concerning issues specific to the southern States of the USA. A scheme for rebuilding Southern commerce: direct trade with the south was published in the Southern Literary Messenger in January 1839. Maury's next naval assignment was a local one, starting in December 1838, surveying on the Atlantic coast between North Carolina and Georgia, initially in a small steamer, the Engineer. The work was then transferred to the Brig Consort, which would not be ready until October. Given leave until then, Maury visited his parents in Tennessee.

=== Injury, more writing, 1839-1842 ===
Returning from leave to join Consort in New York, Maury was travelling by stagecoach through Ohio. On the night of 17 October 1839, the stagecoach overturned, and Maury, who was travelling on the top, was thrown to the ground. His right leg suffered multiple fractures, and his knee was dislocated. As a result of this serious injury he spent two years convalescing, but though he improved considerably, in November 1841 it was finally accepted that he would never be fit enough to return to service at sea. During this period, he reviewed his experiences in the Navy, and decided to write about the bungling, and inefficiency in the Navy, which he thought might jeopardise the future of the nation. He revived the "Harry Bluff" pseudonym, and chose to submit the articles to the Southern Literary Messenger which had a broad circulation, and had already published one of his pieces. The series was aimed at a general audience, who might be unfamiliar with naval issues, and was called Scraps from the lucky bag, the lucky bag being a receptacle for lost and found objects at sea. Articles dealt with the necessity of a navy both for security and national prestige, the need for coastal fortifications, the state of education and the status of officers, the cost of naval shipbuilding and repairs, and the need for re-organisation. The articles gained a wide readership, being reprinted and also circulated by naval officers, and generated considerable controversy.

Maury was elected a corresponding member of the National Institute for the Promotion of Science. The first bulletin of the Institute published in 1841 included a letter from him arguing for exploration of the bottom of the ocean, suggesting that this could be done by equipping revenue cutters with trolls to drag the bottom in the areas they were working, and instructing their crews in carrying out and recording the results of this work. Maury continued to write articles for the Messenger both under the pseudonym "Harry Bluff" and also "Union Jack". In an 1841 Letter to Mr Clay he argued for the development of a Navy yard in Memphis which would help support defences in the Gulf of Mexico, and also suggested a canal should be built to link the Upper Mississippi River to the Great Lakes to support the Naval defence of that area. The following year, he raised the question of the search of American vessels by the Royal Navy on anti-slavery patrol. He likened the British behaviour to a return to the abuses that had led to war between Great Britain and the United States thirty years earlier. Maury made it clear that he did not want war with Britain, but stated "In the Navy, there is but one sentiment ... avert war honorably if you can: if not, let it come: right or wrong the stars and stripes shall not be disgraced on the ocean."

=== Depot of charts and instruments ===
In June 1842, Maury was appointed officer-in-charge of the Navy's "Depot of Charts and Instruments". He arrived in Washington on July 4. This was a significant period for the Navy, as two bills were being discussed in Congress. The first was a bill to re-organise the Navy, and it included many of the measures that Maury had advocated in his "Harry Bluff" articles, including the abolition of the three-officer Board of Commissions, which Maury and many other officers saw as a source of inefficiency in naval procurement. The second was an appropriation bill authorising spending on a new building for the Depot as well as an attached observatory. Both bills passed in August. Maury located a suitable building on Pennsylvania Avenue, and moved the records and equipment of the Depot there. The equipment included chronometers, sextants, barometers and thermometers, as well as a telescope mounted to determine transit times and thus to rate chronometers according to solar and sidereal time. With the approval of additional funds, purchasing of astronomical instruments in Europe, as well as local manufacture, was organised.

Among the records for which Maury was responsible were the logbooks that officers kept during a voyage with a daily record of position, speed, winds, currents, and other weather conditions and observations. The archive contained logs for most of the voyages made by Navy ships since the Navy was created. Maury quickly realised the value of this information, which if properly organised could provide the kind of data he was unsuccessfully looking for when preparing for his assignment on Falmouth as sailing master. Maury decided to start with voyages from New York to Rio de Janeiro, a frequently made voyage for which there were many logbooks. Maury and his assistants worked to extract and summarise the data to provide average conditions for each season of the year for the sea areas along the route. Analysis of the many logs convinced Maury that navigators were not following the best routes, and that substantial savings could be made, and safety improves, if the data were made generally available. But there were many gaps, and he needed additional data to produce satisfactory charts. Maury prepared an abstract log for collection of data in a standard format. This was authorised by the Navy, and an order issued for its use by all naval vessels in late 1842. A version of the log was also prepared for the merchant service.

The first published product of the work on logs was Directions for approaching the west coast of Sumatra which appeared in March 1843. This helped Maury to publicise his plan, which he presented at a meeting of the National Institute for the Advancement of Science in July. He also published a paper aimed at the general public in the Southern Literary Messenger in August. While waiting for more data, Maury continued analysing the old logbooks, and also carried on with the other work of the Depot, including maintaining and calibrating nautical instruments, managing charts, and preparing weather reports, which were issued weekly. He was much involved in the organisation of the "first national Congress of Scientific men" which the National Institute was holding in April 1844. Maury gave a presentation entitled The Gulf Stream and Currents of the Sea on April 2. This was published in the Southern Literary Messenger. During 1844, work on the new observatory building, authorised in 1842, was nearing completion. He was confirmed as head of the Observatory, as well as of the Depot.

Taking up his duties in the Observatory on 8 October 1844, Maury was distressed to find that the instruments had been damaged as a result of being mounted before the building had stabilised and dust had settled, and because of the use of inappropriate materials in construction. Delays resulted while instruments were cleaned and repaired, and the mountings properly prepared. All was in order by April 1, 1845, when former president John Quincy Adams, who had been an early supporter of the Observatory, visited, and was curious to see the "lighthouse in the sky". He thought that there should be a house for the superintendent, and said he would like to return and look through some of the instruments. Maury arranged this on a clear night, and Adams recorded in his memoirs that "Lieutenant Maury came with a hack and took me to the Observatory, where I looked through the large Fraunhofer refractor at the nebula Orionis, at the cluster of spangles in Auriga, at the blazing light of Sirius, and at the double stars, orange and blue, in Andromeda."

Maury put together a team of nine naval officers who were trained as astronomical observers, and he carried out many observations himself. An important part of the work was cataloguing stars, both to provide additional information to that in existing catalogues, and to explore a new area of the sky. The existing star catalogues only covered the sky to 15°S. The Washington observatory, being considerably further south than the main observatories in Europe, could cover the skies to 30°S, and thus provide new and valuable information. Maury also pointed out that the sky is not static. Stars change in brightness, sometimes dramatically, and stars and nebulae are not fixed in position. With the power of telescopes it had become possible to show this movement, which suggested that our galaxy is rotating about a centre remote from our solar system. Thus continual observations are needed to track these processes. Maury made an unexpected observation on the night of January 13, 1846. He was observing Biela's Comet which had the short orbital time of 6.6 years. Until then, it was notable mainly as the only comet known to intersect the earth's orbit. When Maury turned his telescope to it, he saw a second object slightly to the north, and surmised the Biela had split in two. This was subsequently confirmed, and on the next expected return in 1852 both companions were seen. But in 1872 instead of the comets there was a spectacular meteor shower, indicating that the comet had disintegrated.

=== Wind and Current charts ===
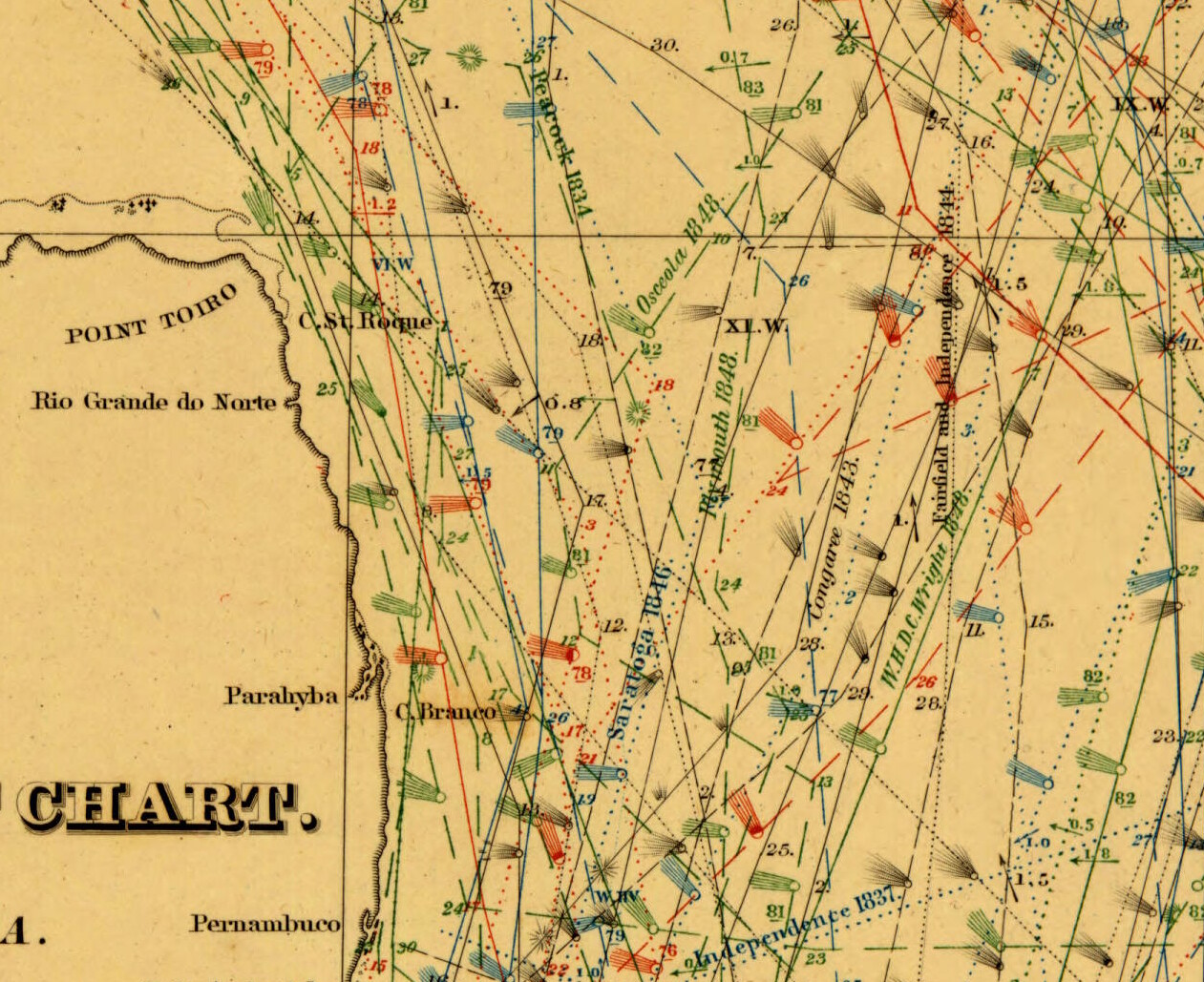
Portion of Maury's track chart of the S. Atlantic, showing winds and currents off the east coast of Brazil. The brushes "fly with the wind", and show the prevailing S.E. trade winds in this area.

In Autumn 1847, Maury sent a report on progress to John Quincy Adams in the form of a letter, which was published early the following year in the Southern Literary Messenger. He pointed out that astronomy was a rapidly advancing subject, and discussed some of the recent advances, both in the science and the attitudes toward it. Thus comets were seen in previous centuries as portents of doom, but were now subjects of eager interest. He gave an account of the instruments in the observatory and their purposes, and described the plan of observations and cataloguing to be carried out, and noted the progress that had already been made. He reminded his readers of the practical uses of astronomy, especially in navigation and surveying, but also the potential to help provide a universal basis for standards of weights and measures. He also dealt with the other activities for which he was responsible, those of the original Depot, of managing charts, records, and instruments, and making meteorological observations. He described the progress of the preparation of Wind and Current Charts, which would present the results of the work summarising data from the ships' logs. The first of eight sheets of the Atlantic had already been published, the others were with the engraver.

On the basis of the wind and current data, Maury was convinced that mariners sailing to Rio de Janeiro from the Eastern USA were taking an unnecessarily devious course, in particular sailing too far to the eastward. He recommended sailing no further east that 30°W when crossing the equator. The Doldrums, an area of variable, light, and often non-existent winds lies near the equator, but winds are more reliable further west. He then recommended staying fairly close to the Brazilian coast when rounding Cape St. Roque on the easterly "bulge" of Brazil. This ran counter to conventional wisdom among mariners, who preferred to stay well away from the Brazilian coast, but at the risk of calms or contrary winds. The first to try the new route was Captain Jackson of the Baltimore bark W. H. D. C. Wright who sailed to Rio in early 1848. Ho took 38 days, which was a saving of 17 days compared to the normal time. On his return trip he made a similar saving. This achievement was widely publicised, and did much to increase demand for Maury's charts. As Maury did not sell the charts, but made them freely available to those who would complete the abstract logs, it also did much to increase the amount of information coming into the depot.

In 1848, the American Association for the Advancement of Science (AAAS) was formed by the amalgamation of the American Association of Geologists and Naturalists, and the National Institute, of which Maury was a member. He gave a presentation at the Association's first meeting in September, giving a scientific account of the Wind and Current Charts and of the success in gaining the cooperation of navigators in submitting information. He asserted that "Never before was such a corps of observers known; and never before could the commercial marine of any country boast of such a body of navigators as those of America." The meeting adopted a resolution to set up a committee to promote cooperation with other nations to obtain observations to "extend and perfect" the charts for the benefit of all. The charts were certainly gaining international recognition. The "fair way to Rio", as Maury called it, was only the first of many routes to benefit from Maury's efforts. He suggested that by sailing further to the north, vessels from New York could save a day on the voyage to Liverpool, and a week on that to Le Havre. He also looked at voyages from Europe to south of the equator. Whether headed for Cape Horn or the Cape of Good Hope, the advice was the same as for the Rio passage - sail further to the west to avoid the worst of the doldrums.

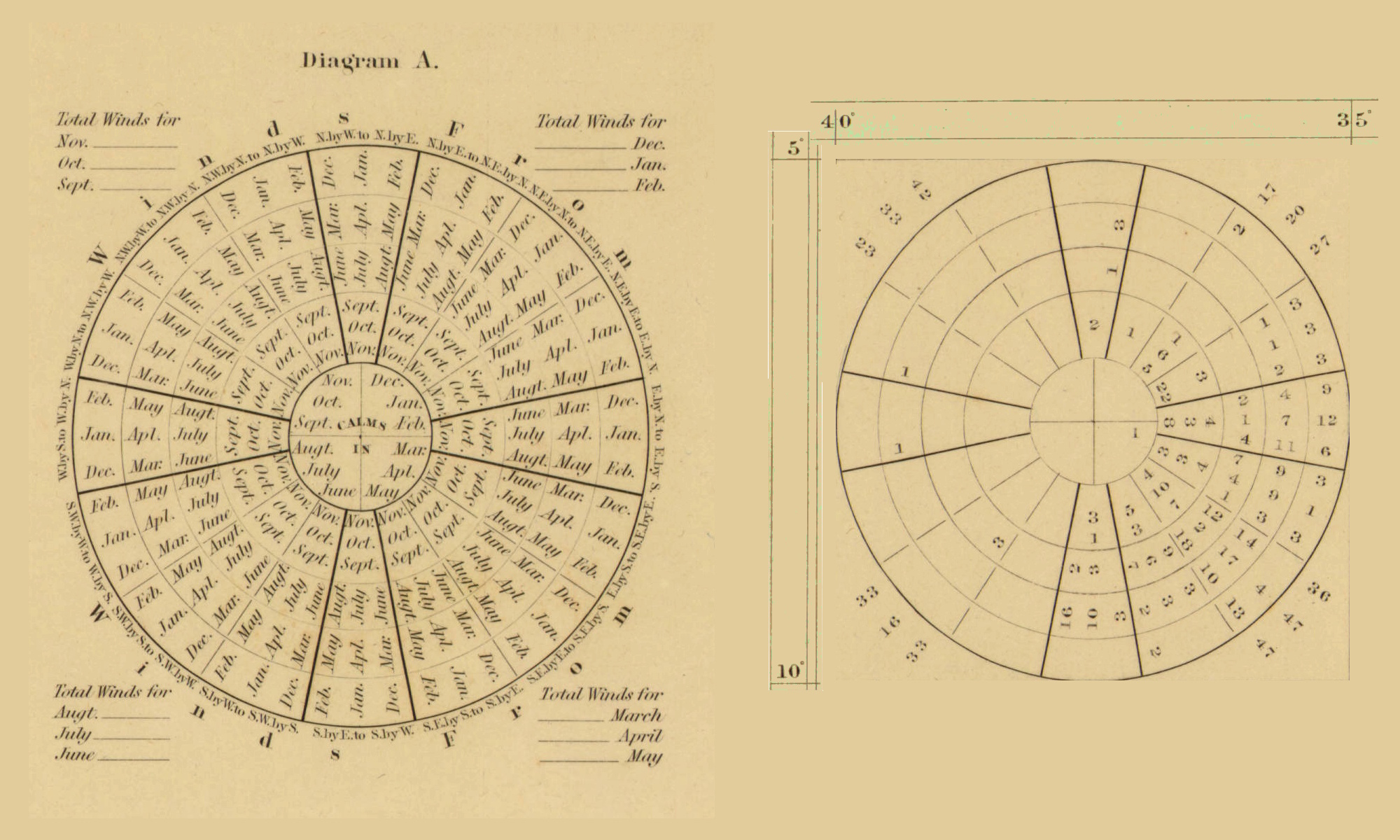
Composite diagram showing, on the right, a single square from a Pilot Chart, covering 5-10°S and 35-40°W, an area off the east coast of Brazil. Numbers are the frequencies with which winds blow from the corresponding compass point. The key on the left indicates how the months of the year are laid out. The prevailing SE winds in this area are apparent.

Illustration of a copepod. From Maury's Sailing Directions, 8th Edition, 1858

Maury's first series of charts, the track charts, covered all the major oceans, and were referred to as series A. Series B covered trade winds and monsoons. Series C, known as Pilot Charts, showed summarised data for 5° X 5° rectangles of latitude and longitude, with the winds from each of the 16 compass points charted by month of the year. Series D were charts of temperature, with colour coding. Series E were storm charts, and Series F were whale charts. To complement the charts, Maury provided a series of explanations. The first two editions were published in 1850, with the title Notice to Mariners. A much expanded third edition appeared in 1851 with the title Explanations and sailing directions to accompany the Wind and Current Charts, and this continued to be revised and expanded until the eight edition, in two volumes, in 1858/1859. The content of Explanations went well beyond issues directly concerned with navigation and meteorology, including material on the saltiness of the seas, deep-sea sounding and the nature of the sea floor, and microscopic life in the sea.

Maury's work on ocean currents and investigations of the whaling industry led him to suspect that a warm-water, ice-free northern passage existed between the Atlantic and Pacific. He thought he detected a warm surface current pushing into the Arctic, and logs of old whaling ships indicated that whales killed in the Atlantic bore harpoons from ships in the Pacific (and vice versa). The frequency of these occurrences seemed unlikely if the whales had travelled around Cape Horn.

Maury was active in the debates concerning transcontinental railroads. In 1849, as the gold rush to California was increasing, Maury advocated construction of a railroad across the Isthmus of Panama. This was built, opening to traffic in 1855. However, Maury considered a railroad through United States territory to be much more important than an isthmus link, for two reasons. Firstly, a railroad provided collateral advantages to the county and people in its vicinity, with improved communications and increased property values, which would not arise from a link in Central America. Secondly he saw that a railroad had military importance, enabling rapid transport of reinforcements and ordnance, which again would only be fully realised with a rail link within the United States. The military consideration also had implications for the Pacific terminus of the railroad, which in Maury's view needed to be at a port which would provide facilities for a naval base. In his view this could not be at the mouth of the Columbia River, another alternative being considered, as it was "under the very guns of our rival" the British, based on Nearby Vancouver Island. Maury argued for either San Francisco or Monterey, as being halfway along the U.S. Pacific coast, and having good harbours. The defence writer John Fass Morton has remarked that "Maury was among the ﬁrst to appreciate and articulate the strategic military importance of the telegraph and railroads". In October 1849 there was a convention held in Memphis to discuss railroad routes and policies. Maury was selected as president of the convention. Various routes were suggested, starting at Natchez, Alabama, Vicksburg and Memphis. The most favoured was a route from Memphis to Monterey, California, which could also could open up commerce with the northern states of Mexico. This was popularly known as the Maury plan.

The third meeting of the AAAS was held in Charleston in March 1850. Maury presented four papers: On the Gulf Stream; Electro-chronography in determining the figure of the earth; Atlantic currents; and Atmospheric circulation.

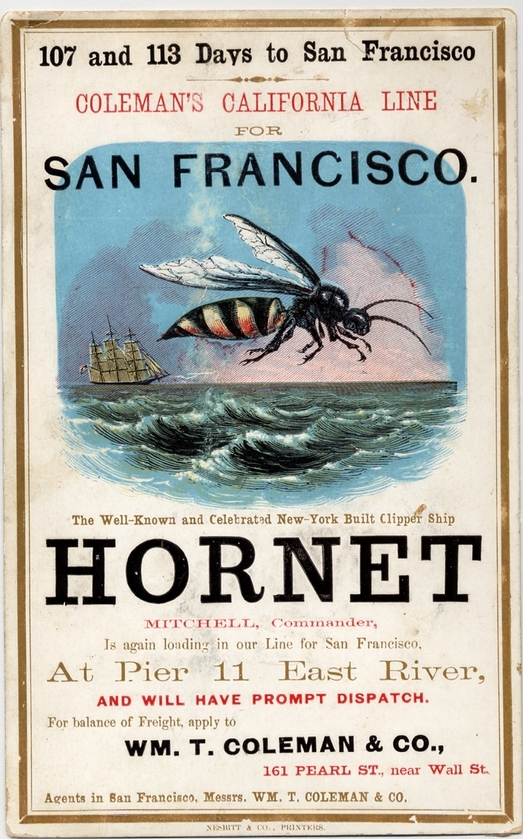
Sailing card for the Hornet, about 1855

In 1851, Maury was able to report that the use of his charts had shortened the passage from New York to San Francisco by 40–44 days. The average for ships using the charts was 144.5 days, for those not using the charts it was 187.5 days. The clippers, which were becoming increasingly popular at this time, achieved faster times. Flying Cloud set a record of 90 days in 1851, using Maury's charts. This stimulated great competition between clipper captains. In effect, the 15,000 mile route between New York and San Francisco became a race-course. A celebrated race, in 1852, was between the Wild Pigeon, the John Gilpin, the Flying Fish, and the Trade Wind. Flying fish won with a time of 92 days. The slowest passage was 118 days. The race was described in detail by Maury in his Physical Geography of the Sea. Another famous race was between Flying Cloud and the Hornet, which the Flying Cloud won with a passage of 104 days, against 106 for Hornet. These passage times were much used in advertising by the shipping companies. The savings in time meant both savings in costs, and a decrease in the hazards of these voyages. These were appreciated by merchants and shippers, by insurance companies, and by governments. For example, the British government noted the liberality of American provision of Wind and Current Charts charts, subject only to conditions which were regarded as "easy and just". Savings were estimated to be, at a minimum £2,000,000 a year on the Indian Ocean routes.

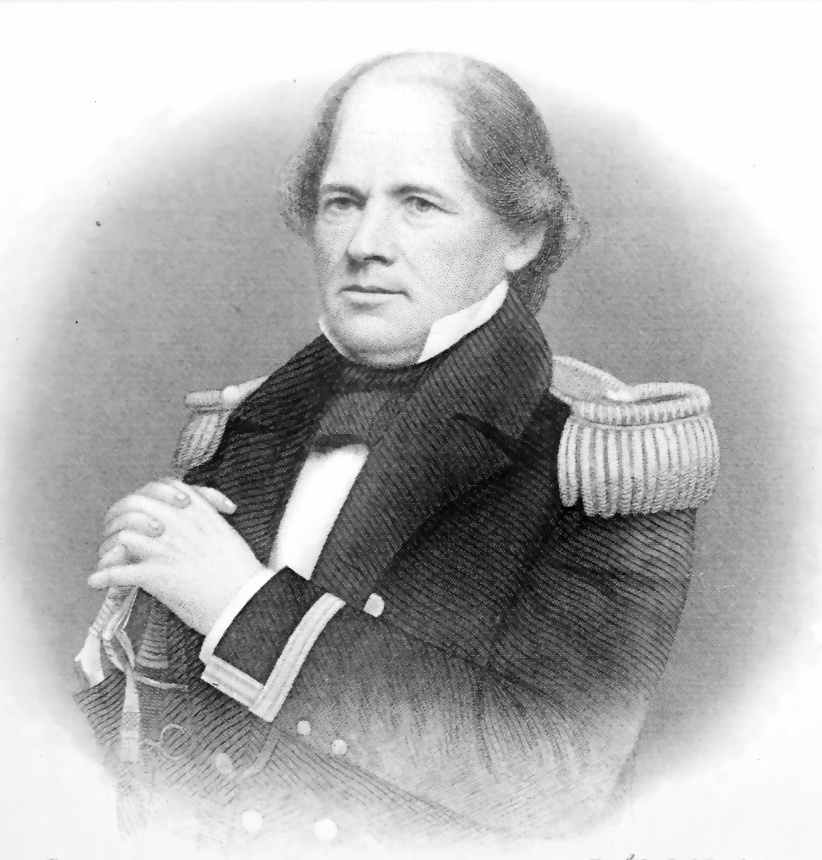
Maury in 1855, engraving by Lemuel Punderson

For his scientific endeavors, Maury was elected to the American Philosophical Society in 1852.

== International meteorological conference ==
Maury recognised the need for international cooperation in gathering information from the oceans of the world, writing:

The ﬁeld is as wide as the world, and as broad as the ocean, and the work is for the beneﬁt of all who use the sea, and therefore it appeared appropriate that all who use the sea should be invited to contribute, each his quota towards its safe and easy navigation. Every right-minded seaman will, I am sure, he glad of the invitation, because it affords him the privilege of increasing the value of this great magazine of nautical information.

In November 1851, Secretary of State Daniel Webster received a communication from the British Government suggesting United States co-operation in international land-based meteorological observations. This was passed to Maury, who saw the opportunity to expand this proposal to include sea-based observations, stating that "no general system of meteorological observation can be considered complete unless it embrace the sea as well as the land". He suggested that an international meteorological congress be held, at which a universal system of making meteorological observations could be agreed, and a programme of international collaboration collecting such data established. Webster and Secretary of the Navy William A. Graham approved this plan, and the proposal was sent as an official reply to the British. Maury was authorised to confer with relevant officials in at home and abroad on implementing the proposal. He first contacted diplomats representing and dealing with countries both in Europe and Latin America, as well as Turkey, Hawaii and China. He then obtained support from many prominent scientists abroad, including Alexander von Humboldt. He had less success at home. Both Joseph Henry, secretary of the Smithsonian Institution and Alexander Dallas Bache, superintendent of the U.S. Coastal Survey were suspicious of government initiatives in scientific matters, and Henry, who was working on land meteorology was actively opposed to the inclusion of land observations in the international programme. There was also opposition from London's Royal Society to the inclusion of land observations, probably because many countries already had established land-based programmes, and it would be more difficult to get agreement than for the sea, where work was much less advanced. However, the Royal Society's report to the Government strongly supported the idea of international sea-based meterology.

The United States decided early in 1853 that an invitation should be issued to an international conference for agreeing a universal system for observations at sea. In April, Britain had still not indicated whether it would take part, and Lord Wrottesley, a distinguished astronomer, made an important speech in the House of Lords supporting the proposal. When this had no immediate effect, the United States decided to send the invitation anyway, as several of the most important countries had already indicated their intention to send delegates. This was done, the International Maritime Meteorological Conference being announced to be held starting on 23 August 1853 in Brussels.

Maury was the United States representative at the conference, and sailed from New York to Liverpool on 23 July 1853. In Liverpool he addressed a meeting of shipowners and underwriters in the Town Hall. This resulted in a petition to the British Government to take part in the forthcoming conference. He then stayed with Lord Wrottesley near Wolverhampton, who was still trying to convince the government to take part in the Brussels conference. He then addressed a meeting at Lloyd's of London. Just before leaving England for the conference itself he heard that the British Government had agreed to take part.

The countries sending delegates to he conference were: Belgium, Denmark, France, Great Britain, The Netherlands, Norway, Portugal, Russia, Sweden, and the United States. The Belgian astronomer Adolphe Quetelet was elected presiding officer. Maury gave the opening address, in which he presented the system being used by the United States. He explained that charts would be made available freely to navies and merchant vessels of other nations on the same basis as to those of the United States, i.e. to those who agreed to provide log data in return. The system would be voluntary for merchant ships, but he suggested that participating navies would order their ships to use the system. Detailed discussions took place over a two-week period on the specific observations that would be made, and their frequency, the instruments to be used, the form of the abstract log, and the instructions to be given. Agreement was reached, and the final vote, to adopt the system, and to encourage the participation of additional counties, was unanimous. The conference closed on 8 September.

The delegate from the Netherlands was Lieutenant Marin Jansen, an early supporter of Maury's work, who had visited him in Washington the previous year. They would become life-long friends. After visiting scientists in Holland Germany France and Britain, Maury returned home, arriving in Washington on 5 October. His report was approved, and he started work on implementation of the plan. Within four months of the conference, Prussia, Spain, Portugal, the Free City of Hamburg, the Republic of Bremen, Chile, Brazil, and others agreed to join the enterprise. By 1858, Mary could state that nations owning more than nine-tenths of the world's shipping of the world's shipping were sending their oceanographic observations to Maury at the Naval Observatory, where the information was evaluated and the results were given worldwide distribution. The Pope established honorary flags of distinction for the ships of the Papal States, which could be awarded only to the vessels that filled out and sent to Maury in Washington, DC, the Maury abstract logs. In 1913, the oceanographer Sir John Murray could write:

[Maury's] plan has been followed [since 1853], the notes being as a rule entered once every watch, so that a formidable pile of material has now been amassed. Up to 1904 the Meteorological Office in London had collected 7 millions of these notes, the Deutsche Seewarte in Hamburg more than 10½ millions, the Dutch Meteorological Institute in De Bilt 3½ millions, the Hydrographical Bureau in Washington 5½ millions, and so on. Add to this the surface observations made by scientific and other expeditions, and it will be evident that in the course of the last sixty years a good deal of knowledge regarding the surface of the sea has been gained.

== The Physical Geography of the Sea ==
While Maury was preparing the sixth edition of the Sailing Directions the publisher, E.C. & J. Biddle suggested that the Directions contained sufficient material for a valuable book, and pointed out that as a government publication the Directions were not protected by copyright, so that any writer could take the information and publish it commercially. They advised that Harper and Brothers of New York would be a suitable publisher. Arrangements were made, Maury completed the book in 1854, and it was published as The Physical Geography of the Sea early in 1855. The title, which had been use as a section heading in the sixth edition of Directions had been suggested by Humboldt. The book, which has been described as "the first textbook of modern oceanography", included material on ocean currents and their effect on climate, the circulation of the atmosphere, evidence for an open arctic sea, the saltiness of the sea, the depths of the ocean, and storms. It was a great success, going through eight editions, and it remained in print for twenty years. A modern reprint of the eighth edition, with a critical introduction by the geographer John Leighly was published in 1963.

Opinions about the book were mixed, both when it appeared, and in more recent times. Leighly, reviewing contemporary judgements of the book, notes that that the most approving reviews were from general and literary periodicals, written from the viewpoint of the general reader, and not based on scientific expertise. Reviews by authors with a scientific background took issue both with some of the assertions and theories in the book, and with Maury's style and general approach. Specific issues raised at the time included Maury's rejection of any significant role of winds in generating ocean currents, his suggestion of a role of terrestrial magnetism in causing winds, and his scheme of the circulation of the atmosphere. Both Sir John Herschel in Britain and the American meteorologist James Pollard Espy took issue with Maury on a number of aspects of these theories.

Maury's wind diagram showing the "crossing over" of winds at the equator and tropics

Ferrel's wind diagram showing his tri-cellular model.

Regarding Maury's scheme on the circulation of the atmosphere, summarised in his Diagram of the Winds, both Herschel and Espy rejected Maury's idea that the currents of air crossed over at the tropics and at the equator. William Ferrel went further, in two publications in 1856 and 1860, the first descriptive, and the second theoretical. Ferrel became an important figure in American meteorology, but in 1856 was a school teacher in Nashville, Tennessee. Ferrel cited observational data showing that the prevailing winds in the polar regions blow away from the pole, not towards it, thus indicating a third zone in each hemisphere rather than Maury's two. His mathematical analysis supported this scheme, which also eliminated the crossing over of the winds. Ferrel's tri-cellular model is still used to represent the atmospheric circulation on a planetary scale.

Based on his review of these and other examples, Leighly comments:

It is evident from what has been cited that as a scientific treatise, The Physical Geography fell well below the level of the best contemporary knowledge. Maury did not know enough physical theory to recognise the difficulty of the problems he disposes of so confidently in his discussions of the motions of the sea and the atmosphere.

The reprint of Physical Geography, with Leighly's introduction, was published in 1963, the same year as the major biography by Frances Leigh Williams, Matthew Fontaine Maury: Scientist of the Sea. Several reviewers commented on the contrasting evaluations of Maury in the two books. Oceanographer George Deacon and historian of oceanography Margaret Deacon emphasise the importance of Maury's practical achievements in improving navigation, and also highlight the work he directed on the study of the ocean floor, but broadly agree with Leighly's assessment of Maury's scientific standing. Historian of science Nathan Reingold suggests that no one except Williams considers Maury a great theoretician, but raises the question of pure versus applied science, and is sympathetic towards Williams's support for Maury's desire that navigators and farmers could contribute to science by furnishing data. Social historian of science George Daniels refers to the contrast between the positive reception of Physical Geography by the general reading public in the 1850s and the generally unfavourable response by scientists, and compares this to the two 1963 books: Williams, the biographer without a scientific training, being an enthusiastic proponent of Maury the scientist, while the professional geographer Leighly being critical. He says: "this same division of opinion between the scientists and the public is still with us".

Leighly regarded the most valuable parts of Physical Geography to be those where Maury describes original observations carried out at his direction, which included deep-sea soundings. Margaret Deacon commented:

Though in some respects the Physical Geography of the Sea characterized the worst kind of superficiality which, while correcting some old errors, introduced a good many new ones, there was a lot of useful information in it, particularly in connection with the exploration of the deep sea floor which was just beginning in the early 1850s and in which Maury had a considerable share.

Deep sea sounding was a difficult problem at the time. The standard method of sounding was with "lead and line", a weight lowered on a line until it reached the bottom, when a shock would be felt, and the line would stop running out. Navigators routinely used this for depths of 100–200 fathoms (180–370 m) to determine when they were approaching land, and hydrographic surveyors were able to sound depths of up to 1,000 fathoms (1,800 m). At greater depths, it was difficult to tell when the bottom had been reached, and the line could be carried by currents giving spuriously high readings. A major step forward was the development of a sounding apparatus by John Mercer Brooke, a passed midshipman who was on Maury's Observatory staff. This used a heavy spherical weight drilled or cast to hold a vertical tube. When the apparatus struck the bottom, the weight was detached. The tube had a cavity in which a sample of the sea floor would be captured. The tube would then be brought to the surface. A heavy weight could be used, keeping the line taut on the descent. Only the much lighter tube was hauled to the surface, reducing the likelihood that the line would break. The presence of the sample proved that the bottom had been reached. The apparatus subsequently underwent many modifications, but it enabled the first reliable deep sea measurements, and allowed sea floor material to be obtained for analysis.

The first soundings with the Brooke device were made in depths of up to 2,000 fathoms (3,700 m) in the Atlantic by Lieutenant Otway Berryman in the survey ship Dolphin in 1853. The successful sounding and sampling of the sea bottom led to further work which enabled Maury to publish a detailed bathymetric chart of the North Atlantic in Physical Geography. Brooke later obtained samples in up to 2,700 fathoms (4,900 m) in the Sea of Kamchatka (eastern Bering Sea) while taking part in the Ringgold-Rodgers Expedition. Samples from both voyages were sent by Maury for examination by the naturalist Jacob Whitman Bailey at West Point, who noted that they were "believed to be the deepest ever submitted to microscopic examination". The material was found to consist almost entirely of the remains of living organisms, in the Atlantic samples mostly the shells of foraminifera and in the Pacific samples largely diatoms. Mineral particles became less common as the depth increased. The conclusion that the material on the deep ocean floor consisted almost entirely of microscopic shells was regarded as "astounding" by contemporary commentators. Maury interpreted the fact that many of the shells were intact as indicating the lack of currents in the deep ocean.

The deep sea data were important for the planning of the Atlantic telegraph cable. In 1854, businessman and financier Cyrus W. Field became interested in the idea of a telegraphic connection between Europe and North America. He consulted Samuel Morse about the possibility of transmission of signals over the distances involved, and Maury about the feasibility of laying a cable across the ocean floor. Maury responded with a summary of the findings from the deep sea work, and referred to a "telegraphic plateau" between Newfoundland and Ireland, with depths no greater than 2,000 fathoms (3,700 m), "which seems to have been placed there especially for the purpose of holding the wires of a submarine telegraph, and of keeping them out of harm's way". The description of the sea floor as a plateau has been criticised, since the cable was actually "draped across mountains and canyons. In crossing the Atlantic they are unavoidable". This part of the ocean floor is now considered to be the northern part of the Mid-Atlantic Ridge. The cable was successfully laid, and though it failed to transmit after about a month, this was attributed to the cable design, not to the terrain. A successful cable was laid in 1866 along a similar route.

Brooke's deep sea sounding apparatus. From Physical Geography, 1855.

Depth chart of the North Atlantic, showing attempted and proposed telegraph routes. From Physical Geography, 1860.

Microscopic forms collected from the bottom of the Sea of Kamchatka in 1856

== Proposed deportation of enslaved people to Brazil ==
Maury had long been interested in Latin America, and had argued for increased direct trade from southern ports such as Norfolk and Charleston to Latin America as a way of strengthening the economy of the American South. His interest in Brazil was particularly aroused by Brazil's "closed-door" policy towards Amazon navigation, prohibiting steamboat access for both trade and exploration. In 1852 he submitted a Memorial to Congress advocating the establishment of a mail steamboat line between Norfolk or Charleston and Pará at the mouth of the Amazon, which would both stimulate the commerce of the southern states, and facilitate direct trade between the USA and Brazil.

Maury had another reason for wanting to see the Amazon valley opened up. He saw the Black population of the southern states as a problem. He pointed out that when the northern states abolished slavery, they did not necessarily emancipate their slaves. Most states had a gradual policy that allowed the slaveholders to go south with their slaves and either settle in the south or sell the slaves and return home. Thus he saw the northern policy as effectively banishment of their Black population. But no such option existed for the South. Enslaved people could not go out of slave territory: "The South could not, if she would, banish her slaves and tell the world that it is emancipation; for she has no place of banishment to send them to". Maury did not believe that Black and White could freely co-exist peaceably: "the time will come ... when the two races will join in the death struggle for mastery". He did not consider African colonisation a practical option, but thought the valley of the Amazon was the solution. It was already slave territory; and it was, in his view, largely a wilderness that could be tamed by African labour. Thus he saw the valley of the Amazon as "the safety-valve of the South." Maury expressed these views in an article in the Southern Literary Messenger, and in a letter dat24 December 1851.</ to his cousin Mary Blackford.

Maury's position was criticised at the time, by Marcus C. M. Hammond of South Carolina, for implying the probable future extinction of slavery in the South. Hammond argued that the anti-slavery movement was running to seed, that Britain would re-establish slavery in its colonies in due course, that "slavery, this day, stands on a firmer basis than it has ever done!", and that if necessary the South could break the cordon restricting slavery by conquering Mexico to establish slavery there, or could introduce slavery into California and Oregon. While Maury was not himself a slaveholder, modern critics have tended to see his position as pro-slavery, international and expansionist, emphasising his reference to the work in clearing the Amazonian "wilderness" for cultivation which was "to be done by the African with the American axe in his hand."

While exploration of the Amazon by steamboat was forbidden, Maury proposed an alternative plan for exploration to William Alexander Graham, Secretary of the Navy. This involved sending explorers to cross over the Andes from Lima in Peru into the headwaters of the Amazon, and then to descend the river "as they might", gathering information on the way. Two naval officers led the expedition. One was Maury's brother-in-law, Lieutenant William Lewis Herndon, the other was midshipman Lardner Gibbon. The expedition left Lima on 21 May 1851. Herndon and Gibbon arrived back in the USA the next year, having taken different routes and experienced great hardship, and both men discussed their findings with Maury in detail. Maury wrote extensively about Brazil under the pseudonym "Inca". The first articles appeared in late 1852 as a series of letters in the Daily National Intelligencer. In these, He wrote at length on the geography and climate of the Amazon and La Plata valleys, emphasising their fertility, and the relative mildness of the climate compared to areas in other continents at similar latitudes. He described resources including gold, diamonds, ornamental woods, and other important plants. He pointed out the importance of the five republics whose territory included navigable tributaries of the Amazon, Bolivia, Peru, Granada (mainly present-day Colombia), Ecuador, and Venezuela, and which were forced by Brazil's policy to export commodities over the mountains to the Pacific or Caribbean coasts, rather than down the Amazon and to the Atlantic. He argued that Brazil had no right to shut of the navigation of these countries, and compared their policy unfavourably with that of Japan, which closed commerce only with its own territory. He suggested that it should be the policy of the great commercial nations not to permit such a situation to continue.

The interest aroused by the publication of the account of Herndon and Gibbon's expedition led the editor of De Bow's Review to request additional articles from Maury, which were published in 1853. The situation of La Plata had changed, and that valley had been opened to navigation. Also, Brazil had started steamboat navigation on the Amazon, but only by its own boats. Maury re-iterated the demand that Brazil opened its waters to international traffic, arguing that it would be beneficial to Brazil's prosperity as well as to other nations. He cited the fact that Brazil had ordered the arrest of the explorer Alexander von Humboldt if he ever entered Brazil, as evidence for the absurdity of the policy. However, Emperor Pedro II's government firmly rejected the proposals, and Brazil maintained its closed-door policy until 1866, when it was at war against Paraguay, and free navigation in the area had become necessary.

== American Civil War ==
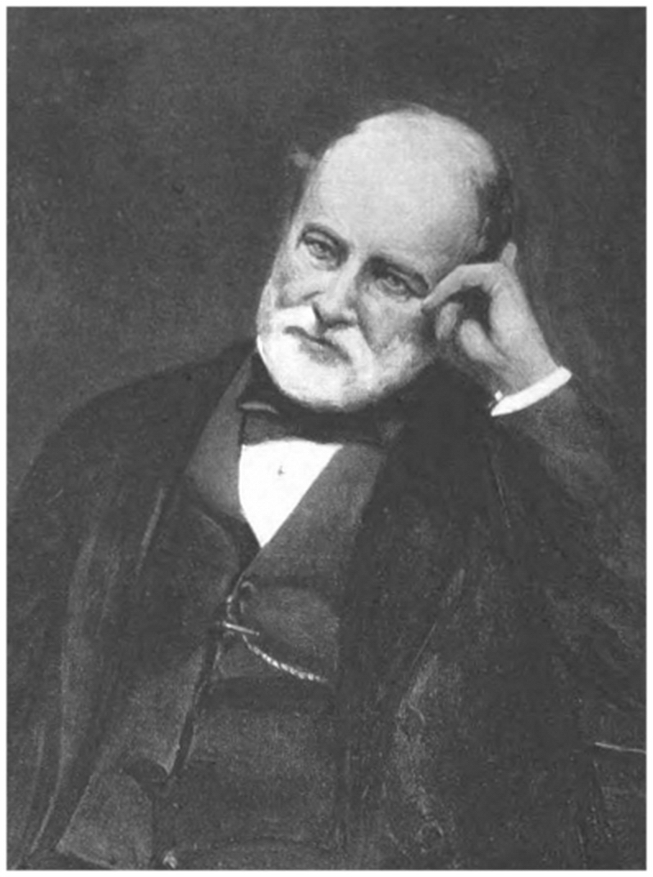
Commander Matthew Fontaine Maury

=== Secession of Virginia from the Union ===
Maury opposed secession, believing that the differences between North and South could and should be settled within the union. As the tensions increased, he wrote letters to the governors of New Jersey, Pennsylvania, Delaware, and Maryland urging them to stop the momentum toward war, and suggested that either New Jersey or Pennsylvania should act as mediator between the sections, as they were the northern states least hostile to southern interests. But this suggestion was not follwed up When Virginia declared secession in April 1861, Maury nonetheless resigned his commission in the U.S. Navy, choosing to fight against the North, rather than "fight against his own".

Upon his resignation from the U.S. Navy, the Virginia governor John Letcher appointed Maury as one of the three members of the Advisory Council to the Virginia Convention. The first act of this council was to recommend the appointment of Robert E. Lee as military commander of Virginia. Maury was soon assessing the resources available for the defence of Virginia. Union forces had abandoned the Navy Yard at Portsmouth, Virginia, but not before destroying as much as possible of the ships, munitions and structures of the yard. Much, though, was saved, including the dry dock, many Dahlgren guns and a large quantity of small arms and equipment. But assessing the resources available to the Union Navy, which he knew well, he concluded that the odds were overwhelmingly in favour of the Union, and that desperate measures would be needed. He considered that mining the harbours and rivers would be an effective defensive measure that could be quickly implemented. Various types of naval mines, then known as "torpedoes", had been and tested over the years, but had never been effectively used in warfare. Maury favoured electrically detonated mines,and sent an agent to New York to purchase insulated wire, but this did not succeed, and the initial development would be of torpedoes detonated by contact or by delay fuses. On April 23 Lee was received in Richmond as major general, and on the same day Maury was confirmed in the rank of commander in the Virginia Navy. An editorial in the Lynchburg Virginian rejoiced that: "these two noble men, the very flower of the Army and Navy of the late United States, respond to the call of their glorious old Mother".

=== A Confederate Naval Officer ===
A few days later, Virginia joined the Confederate States. Maury then became a commander in the Confederate Navy. Lacking any ships of war, the Confederacy initially gave priority to the construction of coastal batteries. In May, the Union blockade of Virginia ports began, and regular communication with the North ended. Also in May, Richmond became the Confederate capital, and President Davis and his cabinet, including Stephen Mallory, now Confederate Secretary of the navy, had arrived in the city by early June. Maury soon felt the tensions that developed between the "Kings of Cotton" from the deep South, and the men of Virginia. There were also personal antagonisms between Maury on the one hand and Davis an Mallory on the other from their time in Washington. Maury worried that his services would not be effectively used. Maury also worried about his family, particularly his daughter Betty, who was still in Washington with her husband and small daughter. However hey were able to cross the lines, and arrived in Fredericksburg in June.

Maury began experimenting with torpedoes, and working in ways of obtaining the necessary materials for explosives and detonators. He worked in a room in the house where he stayed with his cousin, exploding small charges of powder in a metal bathtub. In July 1861, he was able to carry out a successful demonstration of an underwater torpedo in the James River, which persuaded Mallory to arrange funding for further development. Shortly after, a Bureau of Coast, Harbor, and River Defense was created with Maury as chief. As soon as funds were available, Maury had torpedoes manufactured, and sent for the defence of the Mississippi.

In the autumn of 1861 Maury published two articles in the Richmond Enquirer proposing the building of a fleet of small mobile steam-powered gunboats to harass Union warships, and defend the coasts and rivers of the South. At the same time, an entirely different project was underway. John Mercer Brooke had proposed rebuilding the frigate Merrimac, raised after being sunk in the destruction of the Norfolk yard, as an armour-plated vessel, or Ironclad. Brooke had also designed rifled guns for the ship. Maury thought that building a fleet of such vessels was impracticable, and that only his proposal could deliver many armed craft quickly. While this was going on, Mallory had ordered Maury to discontinue the torpedo work, and travel to Cuba on a procurement mission. This was very controversial in government circles, and the order was later rescinded. He resumed work on torpedoes, and in December 1861 the construction of gunboats was authorised. 8 March 1862 saw the Merrimac, renamed CSS Virginia in action in Hampton Roads, successfully destroying or disabling several wooden Union warships. But the Union had also been developing armoured ships, and the following day their own ironclad the USS Monitor arrived and challenged the Virginia. The resulting battle of the ironclads was indecisive, with neither ship being able to inflict serious damage on the other. But the impact on policy was profound, as it was clear that wooden ships were unable to contend with armoured vessels. This led to the suspension of the building of gunboats.

A Confederale "torpedo" (naval mine), from a Union report of 1865.

In the spring of 1862, Maury was informed that 10 miles (16 km) of telegraph wire had been washed ashore near Norfolk, after being abandoned by Union forces. Obtaining this allowed him to start work on planting electric torpedoes in the James River to defend the approaches to Richmond. This was completed by June.

=== Special service in Europe ===
In September 1862, Maury, partly because of his international reputation, and partly due to jealousy of superior officers who wanted him placed at some distance, was ordered on special service to England in order to purchase and fit ships for the Confederacy and to help persuade European powers to recognize and support the Confederacy. He handed over responsibility for the torpedo work to his assistant Hunter Davidson, who, with other colleagues, would improve and expand the operation.

Maury took his young son Matthew Jr., then 13, with him to England, and was also accompanied by an aide, Midshipman James Morris Morgan, who had worked with Maury on mining the James River. After some delays due to blockade-running they travelled first to Bermuda, where Maury received a warm welcome from the British governor and many others. But Great Britain was neutral in the American conflict, and it was made clear that he was being recognized for his scientific standing, not as a Confederate naval officer. As the historian Warren F. Spencer noted, this would be a foretaste of his reception in Europe. They then travelled to Halifax, Nova Scotia, and on to Liverpool where they arrived on 23 November. There he met James Bulloch, the chief of the Confederacy's operations in England. Bulloch had already had considerable success in purchasing and equipping several ships for the Confederacy, including the CSS Florida and the CSS Alabama, both of which were commissioned shortly before Maury arrived, and went on to be successful commerce raiders.

Maury then moved to London, where he was welcomed by friends and admirers, including Lord Wrottesley, Robert FitzRoy, and Marin Jansen, who had travelled from the Netherlands to meet him. Maury discussed the progress of diplomatic negotiations on recognition with James Mason the Confederate Commissioner in London. Mason was optimistic that the economic difficulties arising from shortage of cotton due to the Union blockade would force Britain to seek an end to the war, and saw British sympathies as favouring the South. Maury was not convinced. He had many friends in England, and concluded that sympathy for the South "... is largely confined to the upper classes, and in the main more apparent than real. It is not that the sympathisers love us our our cause more, but they hate us less than they hate the Yankees, and as for the cause, they like ours less than the Yankee cause with its abolition and the like." He understood that the British government, though aristocratic, could not ignore public opinion, which generally favoured the North. This did not prevent him from continuing to advocate the southern cause, both through official contacts and by public activities such as speeches and newspaper articles, but the greater part of his efforts in Britain would be in support of the war effort.

As the war progressed the British government steadily tightened its neutrality policy. Bulloch had believed that by having ships leave British ports without armaments, and with a British crew, he was meeting the requirements of the Foreign Enlistment Act of 1819. Ships would then be armed, and taken over by Confederate officers outside British waters. The British authorities were concerned that since the ships were clearly designed as warships (and Union agents were active in British yards and knew this) Britain’s international obligations as a neutral power were being breached. They increasingly obstructed ship procurement, detaining vessels, and first attempting to obtain a broad interpretation of the law in the courts, and when that failed putting pressure on shipbuilders with threats of delays and court actions, and ultimately by buying ships to prevent their acquisition by the South. The Alabama only evaded detention by leaving port sooner that announced under a subterfuge.

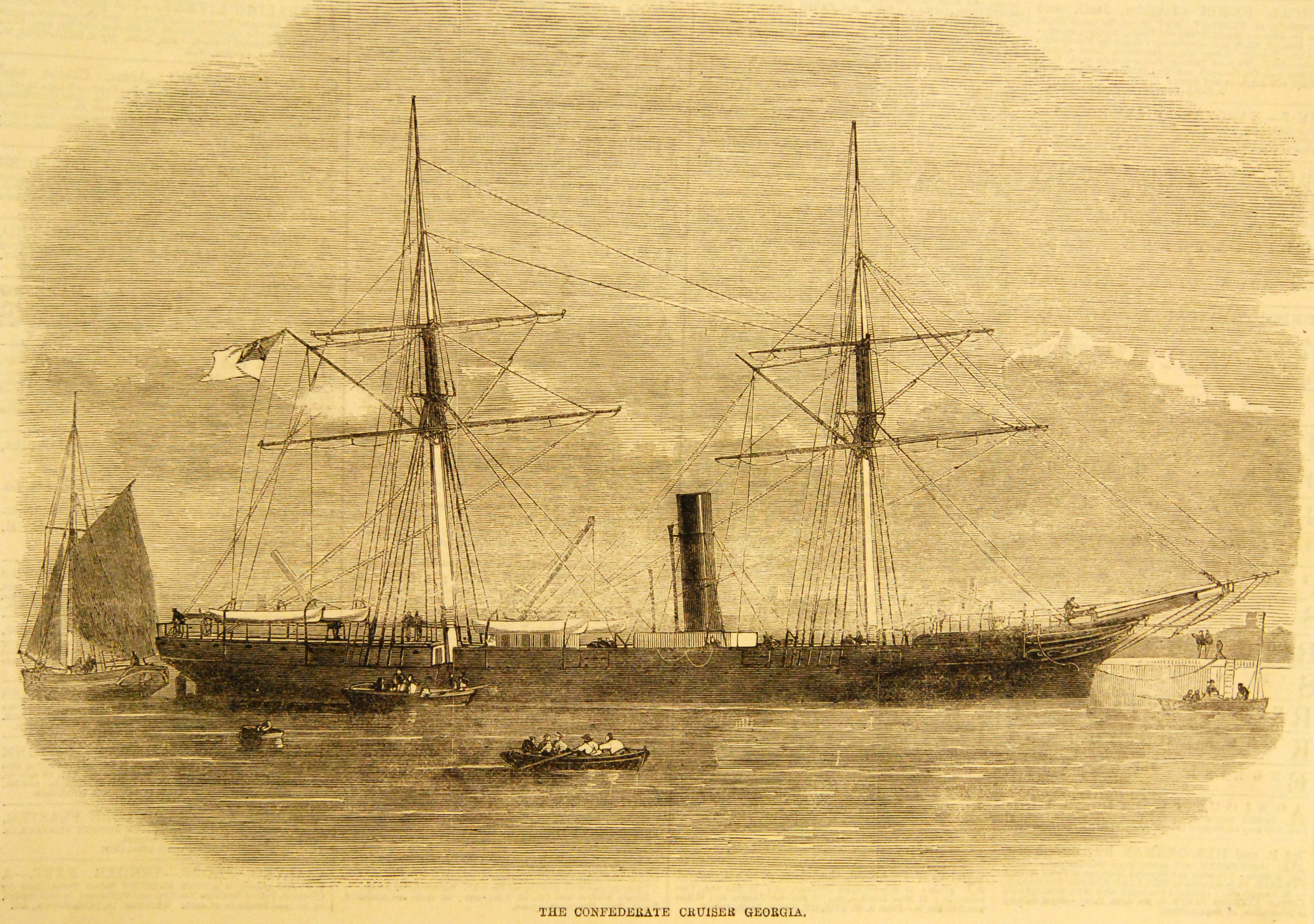
CSS Georgia

Against this background, Maury succeeded in acquiring and equipping one ship as a commerce raider, CSS Georgia, built in Dumbarton in Scotland as the Japan, an iron-hulled merchant ship. She was not modified from her original design, and Maury was able to keep Southern involvement secret, no small achievement given the vigilance of Union agents. His Dutch naval friend Marin Jansen undertook a search for suitable vessels and oversaw the details of construction. Thomas Bold, a cousin of Maury who was employed by a shipping company with offices in Liverpool was able to arrange finance that was not identifiable as Confederate money and purchased the ship. Maury recruited the officers that had been assembled to sail on the Alexandra, currently detained by the British. She sailed on 1 April 1863 with customs clearance as an ordinary ship of commerce. She was supplied with arms and stores off the coast of Brest, and had some success as a commerce raider, capturing and destroying six or seven American vessels. But she turned out to be a poor sailor and required frequent stops to take on coal. In October she returned to Europe and put into Cherbourg and did not return to the Atlantic. Maury's second ship was not in the end a success. She started life as HMS Victor and had been decommissioned and was in need of repair. Maury was able to buy her from the British Navy, and have repairs continued at the yard in Sheerness. The ship left Sheerness abruptly on 24 November 1863, before repairs had been fully completed, and was commissioned as CSS Rappahannock. But mechanical problems forced her put into Calais, where it sought to have repairs carried out, but was detained for the duration of the war, and never saw action.

Wheatstone's Exploder

Maury's other important activity in England was research into the use of electricity for detonating explosives. There was considerable experience in this field in Britain. An early example was the clearance of the wreck of HMS Royal George from the Solent in 1839, which used electric detonation of underwater charges, but Britain had not yet developed naval mines as a weapon of war. Maury collected as much information as he could about recent developments, and also carried out his own experiments on detonation. Charles Wheatstone had recently developed his "exploder", a hand-cranked generator, that could deliver a much more powerful current than could be obtained from a battery, and was also more portable. It allowed operators to fire charges from a greater distance, and several charges could be detonated simultaneously. Together with the copper-phosphide fuse developed by Frederick Abel specifically for underwater use, these provided a more flexible and reliable system for detonating naval mines. Maury met and exchanged ideas with Wheatstone, and also with General John Burgoyne of the Royal Engineers who was developing British policy on the use of mines for coastal defence. He obtained a number of exploders and Abel fuses, and sent them to the Navy Department in Richmond, along with information on the results of his experiments, and analyses of the fuses so that they could be manufactured in the South.

Maury continued his propaganda efforts in support of the South. In August 1863 he wrote a long letter to The Times on "Prospects of the Confederates". This provided the stimulus for a new effort to promote a peaceful solution. In December, The conservative politician Alexander Beresford Hope organised a meeting in London to promote this cause, and eventually more than 900 people signed up. Maury wrote and edited pamphlets in support of the initiative. The Canadian-born Anglican priest Francis Tremlett, had preached a sermon in November in support of the Confederate cause, and Maury helped to arrange for copies to be printed and distributed to every parish in England, to support a petition campaign. By the summer thousands of signatures had been obtained, and Maury, along with other leaders of the movement, met with the Prime Minister Lord Palmerston in July 1864 to present the case for British government action, but without success.

On 2 May 1865, having learned of Lee's surrender at Appomattox Maury left England, and sailed for Texas with a consignment of torpedo equipment, hoping to contribute to the defence of Galveston. However by the time he reached Havana he learned of the surrender of Johnston and the capture of Jefferson Davis. The Confederacy, and Maury's contribution to it were over.

Confederate torpedoes were described by the Secretary of the U.S. Navy in 1865 as "to have cost the Union more vessels than all other causes combined."

Maury established relations for the Confederacy with Emperor Napoleon III of France and Archduke Maximilian of Austria, who, on April 10, 1864, was proclaimed Emperor of Mexico.

At an early stage in the war, the Confederate States Congress assigned Maury and Francis H. Smith, a mathematics professor at the University of Virginia, to develop a system of weights and measures.

== Later life ==
The war had brought ruin to many in Fredericksburg, where Maury's immediate family lived. On the advice of Robert E. Lee and other friends, he decided not to return to Virginia but sent a letter of surrender to U.S. naval forces in the Gulf of Mexico and headed for Mexico. There Maximilian, whom he had met in Europe, appointed him "Imperial Commissioner of Colonization". Maury and Maximilian planned to entice former Confederates to emigrate to Mexico, building Carlotta and New Virginia Colony for displaced Confederates and immigrants from other lands. Upon learning of the plan, Lee wrote Maury saying, "The thought of abandoning the country, and all that must be left in it, is abhorrent to my feelings, and I prefer to struggle for its restoration, and share its fate, rather than to give up all as lost." In the end, the plan did not attract the intended immigrants and Maximilian, facing increasing opposition in Mexico, ended it. Maury then returned to England in 1866 and found work there.

In 1868, he accepted a pardon from the U.S. government. He returned to the US, teaching physics at the Virginia Military Institute in Lexington, Virginia. While in Lexington, he conducted a physical survey of Virginia, which he documented in the book The Physical Geography of Virginia. He had once been a gold mining superintendent outside Fredericksburg and had studied geology intensely during that time, so he was well-equipped to write such a book. He aimed to assist war-torn Virginia in rebuilding by discovering and extracting minerals, improving farming practices, and other efforts. He lectured extensively in the United States and abroad. He advocated for creating a state agricultural college as an adjunct to the Virginia Military Institute. This led to the establishment of the Virginia Agricultural and Mechanical College in Blacksburg in 1872, later renamed Virginia Polytechnic Institute and State University. Maury was offered the position as its first president but turned it down because of his age.

He had previously been suggested as president of the College of William & Mary in Williamsburg, Virginia, in 1848 by Benjamin Blake Minor in his publication the Southern Literary Messenger. He considered becoming president of St. John's College in Annapolis, Maryland, the University of Alabama, and the University of Tennessee. From statements that he made in letters, it appears that he preferred being close to General Robert E. Lee in Lexington, where Lee was president of Washington College. Maury served as a pallbearer for Lee. He also gave talks in Europe about cooperation on a weather bureau for land, just as he had charted the winds and predicted storms at sea many years before. He gave speeches until his last days, when he collapsed while giving one. He went home after he recovered and told his wife Ann Hull Herndon-Maury, "I have come home to die."

== Death and burial ==
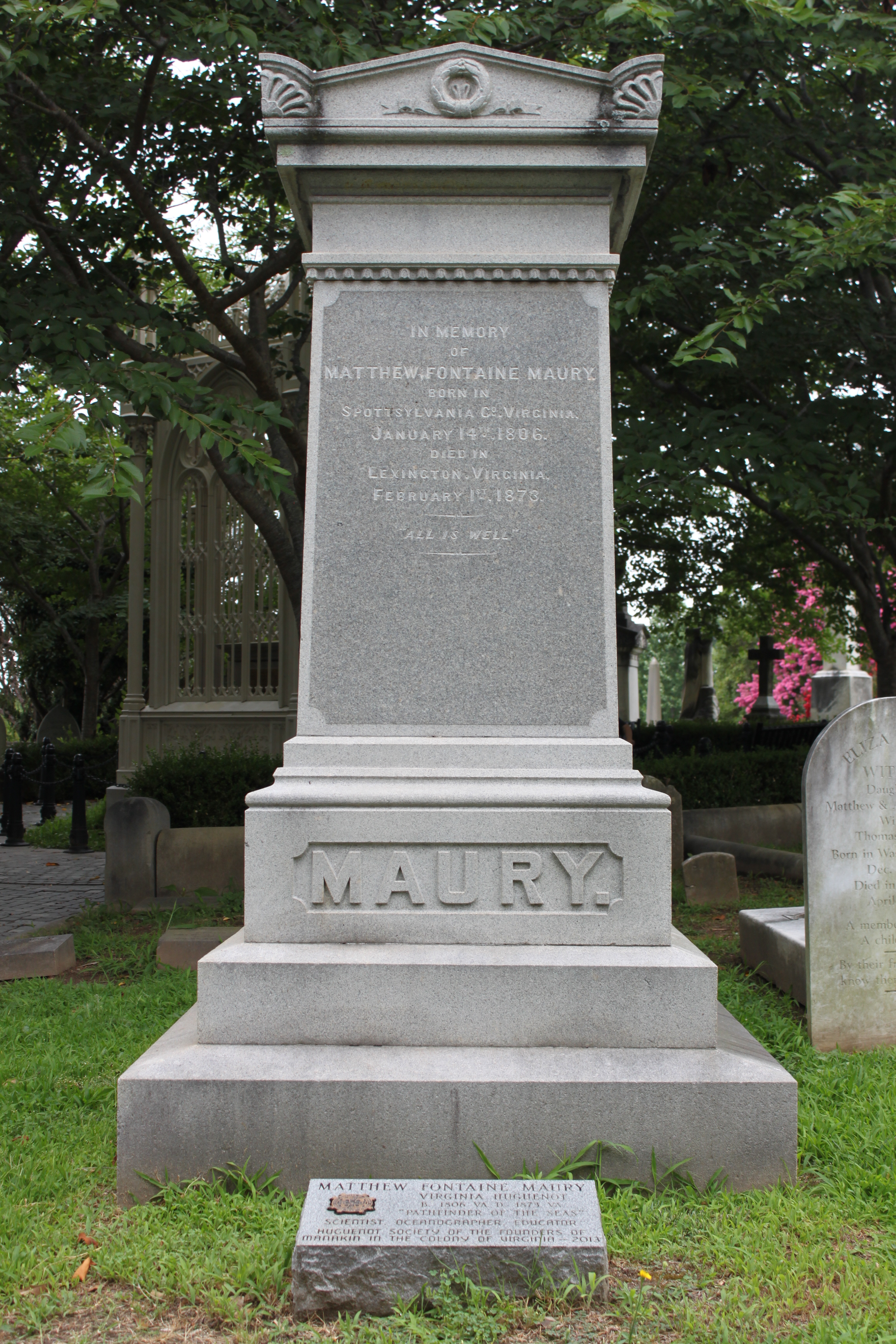
Grave of Maury in Hollywood Cemetery

He died at home in Lexington at 12:40 pm on Saturday, February 1, 1873. He was exhausted from traveling throughout the nation, giving speeches promoting land meteorology. His eldest son, Major Richard Launcelot Maury, and son-in-law, Major Spottswood Wellford Corbin, attended him at the time. Maury asked his daughters and wife to leave the room. His last words, recorded verbatim, were "all's well," a nautical expression meaning calm conditions at sea.

His body was placed on display in the Virginia Military Institute library. Maury was initially buried in the Gilham family vault in Lexington's cemetery, across from Stonewall Jackson, until, after some delay, his remains were taken through Goshen Pass to Richmond, Virginia the following year He was reburied between Presidents James Monroe and John Tyler in Hollywood Cemetery in Richmond, Virginia.

== Legacy ==
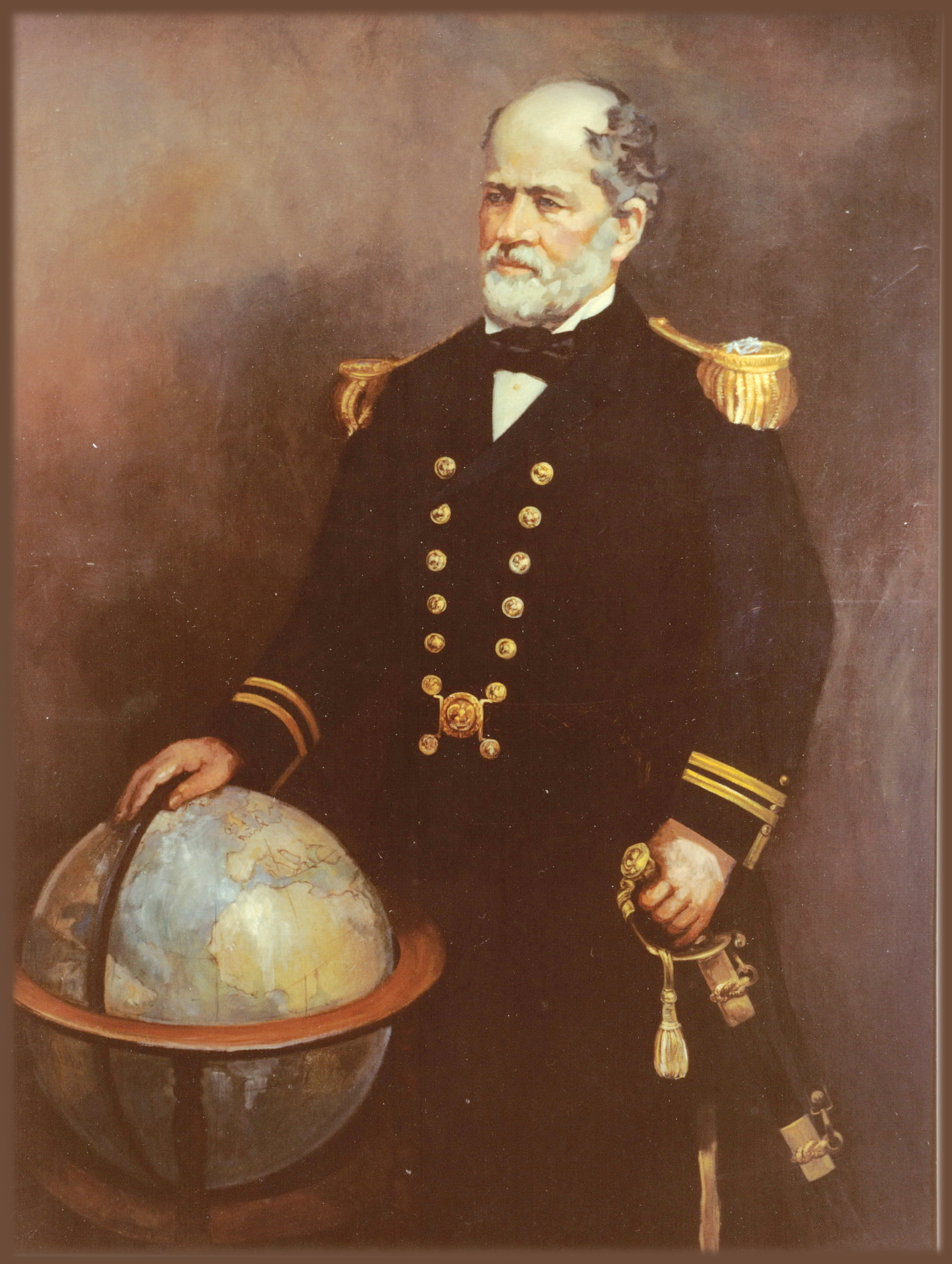
Portrait of Maury by Ella Sophonisba Hergesheimer, 1923

After decades of national and international work, Maury received fame and honors, including being knighted by several nations and given medals with precious gems as well as a collection of all medals struck by Pope Pius IX during his pontificate, a book dedication and more from Father Angelo Secchi, who was a student of Maury from 1848 to 1849 in the United States Naval Observatory. The two remained lifelong friends. Other religious friends of Maury included James Hervey Otey, first Episcopal Bishop of Tennessee and his former teacher who, before 1857, worked with Bishop Leonidas Polk on the construction of the University of the South in Tennessee. While visiting, Maury was convinced by his old teacher to deliver the "cornerstone speech."

As a U.S. Navy officer, he declined awards from foreign nations. Some were offered to Maury's wife, Ann Hull Herndon-Maury, who accepted them on her husband's behalf. Some have been placed at Virginia Military Institute or lent to the Smithsonian. He became a commodore (often a title of courtesy) in the Virginia Provisional Navy and a Commander in the Confederacy.

Maury advocated for naval reform, including a school for the Navy that would rival the Army's United States Military Academy. That reform was heavily promoted by Maury's "Scraps from the Lucky Bag" and other articles printed in newspapers. Some of these articles were reprinted and circulated by naval officers who supported his ideas. This helped to bring about numerous changes in the Navy, including Maury's long-awaited dream of creating the United States Naval Academy, which was established in 1845.

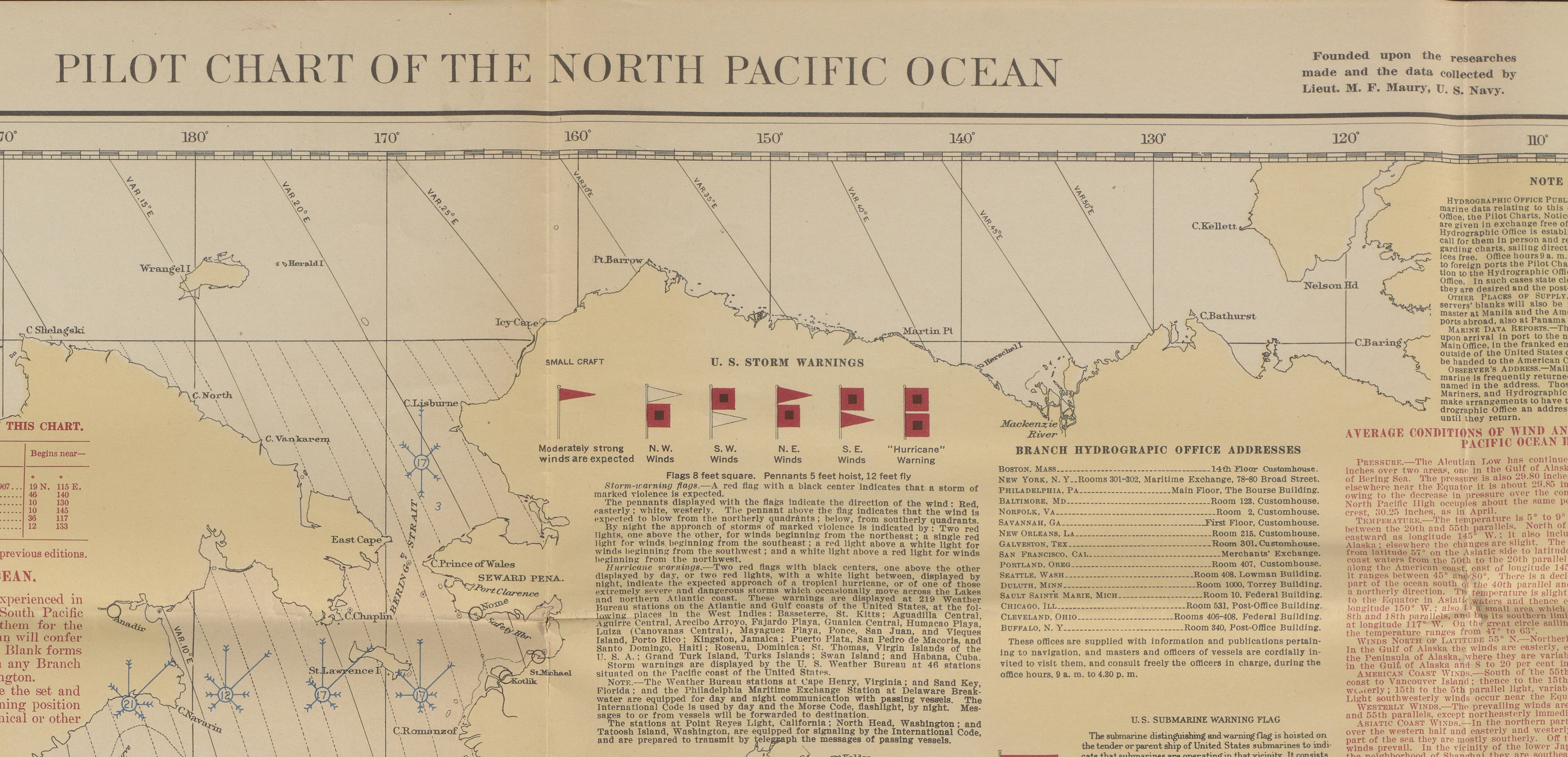
Detail of 1923 Pilot Chart showing the acknowledgement to Lieut. Maury

Maury's Wind and Current Charts provided a model for a class of charts that continue to the present as "Pilot Charts" or "Routeing Charts". Well into the 20th Century, the U.S. charts carried an acknowledgement to Maury as the originator of the series.

Maury has been honoured in a number of ways, including statues, and the naming of buildings, ships, paths, and natural features in his memory. These memorials have been contested due to Maury's role as a confederate officer and advocate. An early example of this was the action of the Salem Marine Society during the American Civil War. When Maury was in charge of the Naval Observatory, the Society elected him an honorary member on account of his labours to lessen the destruction of life and property on the sea. But they expelled him "when he turned traitor and sided with the rebels", and turned his portrait to the wall, hung head-down. The murder of George Floyd in May 2020 and subsequent protests led to a larger racial reckoning, including calls for the removal of statues of confederate politicians and military leaders, and the removal of their names from buildings, and Maury was among those targeted.

Buildings on several college campuses have been named in his memory. Maury Hall was the home of the Naval Science Department at the University of Virginia and headquarters of the university's Navy ROTC battalion until being renamed in 2022. The original building of the College of William & Mary Virginia Institute of Marine Science was named Maury Hall as well, but renamed York River Hall in 2020. Another Maury Hall housed the Electrical and Computer Engineering Department and the Robotics and Control Engineering Department at the United States Naval Academy in Annapolis, Maryland. On February 17, 2023, the Academy announced that it had renamed this building in honor of Jimmy Carter, the only Naval Academy graduate to become President of the United States. The change had been recommended by a naming commission created by federal law to reexamine Confederate-related names and symbols on military installations. James Madison University also has a Maury Hall, the university's first academic and administrative building. In the wake of the 2020 George Floyd protests, JMU student organizations called for renaming the building. On Monday, June 22, 2020, hearing the calls of students and alums, the university president announced it would recommend to the JMU board of visitors to rename Maury Hall, along with Ashby Hall and Jackson Hall.

Ships have been named in his memory, including various vessels named USS Maury; USS Commodore Maury (SP-656), a patrol vessel and minesweeper of World War I; and a World War II Liberty Ship. Additionally, Tidewater Community College, based in Norfolk, Virginia, owns the R/V Matthew F. Maury. The ship is used for oceanography research and student cruises. In March 2013, the U.S. Navy launched the oceanographic survey ship USNS Maury (T-AGS-66), in 2023 the ship was renamed USNS Marie Tharp.

The Mariners' Lake, in Newport News, Virginia, had been named after Maury but had its name changed during the George Floyd protests. The lake is located on the Mariners' Museum property and is encircled by a walking trail.

The Maury River, entirely in Rockbridge County, Virginia, near Virginia Military Institute (where Maury taught), also memorializes the scientist, as does Maury crater, on the Moon.

Matthew Fontaine Maury High School in Norfolk, Virginia, is named after him. Matthew Maury Elementary School in Alexandria, Virginia, was built in 1929. The school was renamed Naomi L. Brooks Elementary School in 2021 based on Maury's association with the Confederacy , with the school's student moniker changed from "Mariners" to "Bees". Nearby Arlington, Va., renamed its 1910 Clarendon Elementary to memorialize Maury in 1944; Since 1976, the building has been home to the Arlington Arts Center (rebranded in 2022 as the Museum of Contemporary Art Arlington). There is a county historical marker outside the former school. Matthew Fontaine Maury School in Fredericksburg was built in 1919-1920 and closed in 1980. The building was converted into condominiums and is on the National Register of Historic Places. Adjoining it is Maury Stadium, built in 1935 and still used for local high school sports events.

Numerous historical markers commemorate Maury throughout the South, including those in Richmond, Virginia, Fletcher, North Carolina, Franklin, Tennessee, and several in Chancellorsville, Virginia. Maury’s portrait, along with others, is painted on the ceiling of the State Library room in the Tennessee State Capitol in Nashville, Tennessee.

The Matthew Fontaine Maury Papers collection at the Library of Congress contains over 14,000 items. It documents Maury's extensive career and scientific endeavors, including correspondence, notebooks, lectures, and written speeches.

A bust of Maury was placed over the main entrance of the Deutsche Seewarte (Maritime Observatory) building in Hamburg, completed in 1881. In 1906, Gaston Lichtenstein, A Virginian, saw the bust in Hamburg, and later wrote a letter to the Richmond Times-Dispatch suggesting that if Germans considered Maury worthy of a memorial his native state should raise a statue in his memory. This led to a campaign, and a memorial was erected on Monument Avenue in Richmond on November 11, 1929. The Deutsche Seewarte building was destroyed by allied bombing in 1945. On July 2, 2020, Richmond Mayor Levar Stoney ordered the removal of the Maury staue. The mayor used his emergency powers to bypass a state-mandated review process, calling the statue a "severe, immediate and growing threat to public safety."

Maury's methods of data collection and analysis used for his charts have been seen by a number of authors as pioneering approaches that would be used in modern information technology. Thus his use of mariners to record wind, currents and weather on their voyages, and to provide the results on standardised forms, has been seen as an early form of crowd-sourcing. Viktor Mayer-Schönberger and Kenneth Cukier see Maury's analysis and presentation of the wind and current data as an early example of big data. They write:

Commander Maury, the "pathfinder of the seas" was among the first to realise that there is a special value in a huge corpus of data that is lacking in smaller amounts- a core tenet of big data. More fundamentally, he understood that the Navy's musty logbooks actually constituted "data" that could be extracted and tabulated. In so doing, he was one of the pioneers of datafication, of unearthing data from material that no one thought had any value.

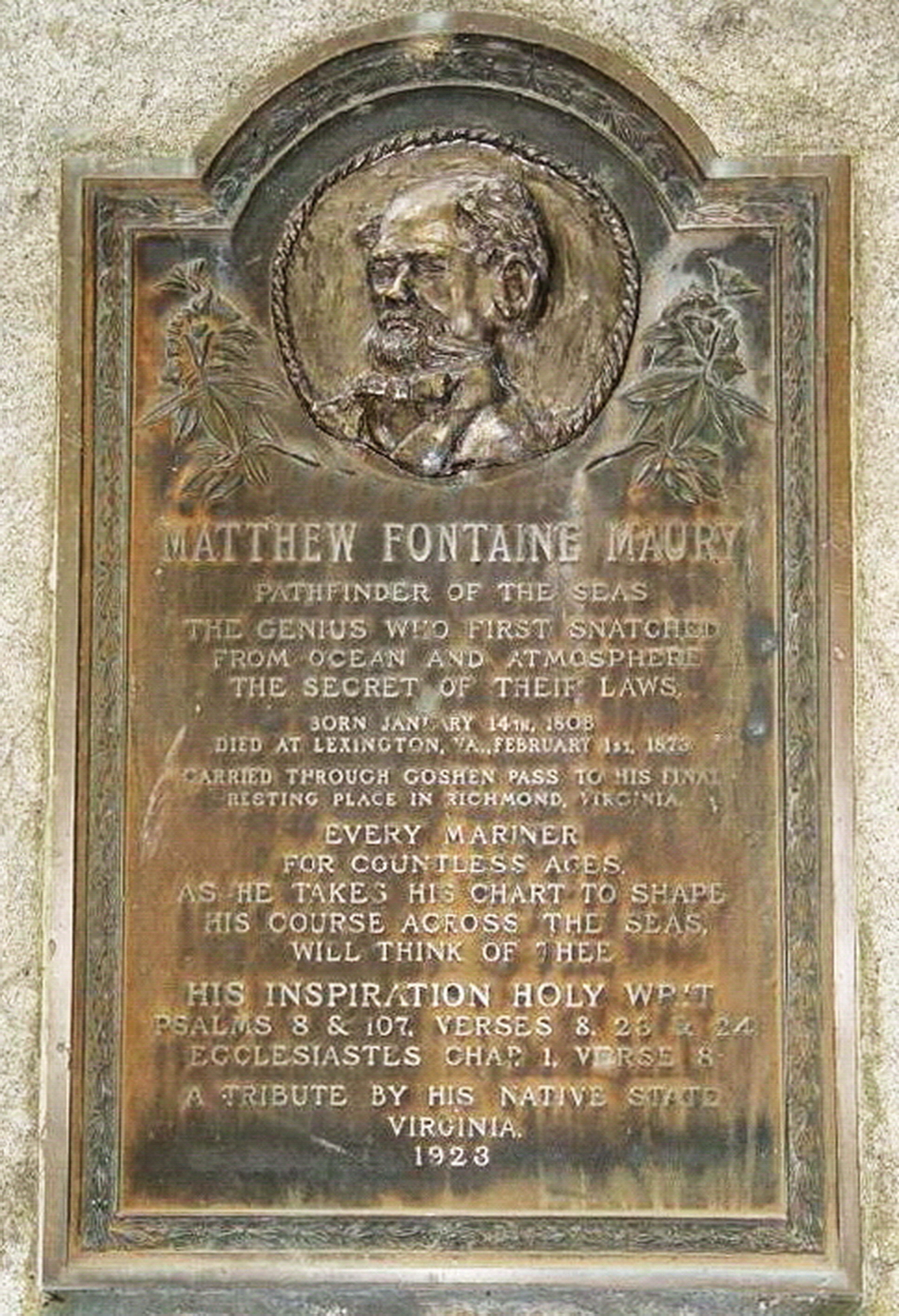
Maury Memorial at Goshen Pass overlooking the Maury River

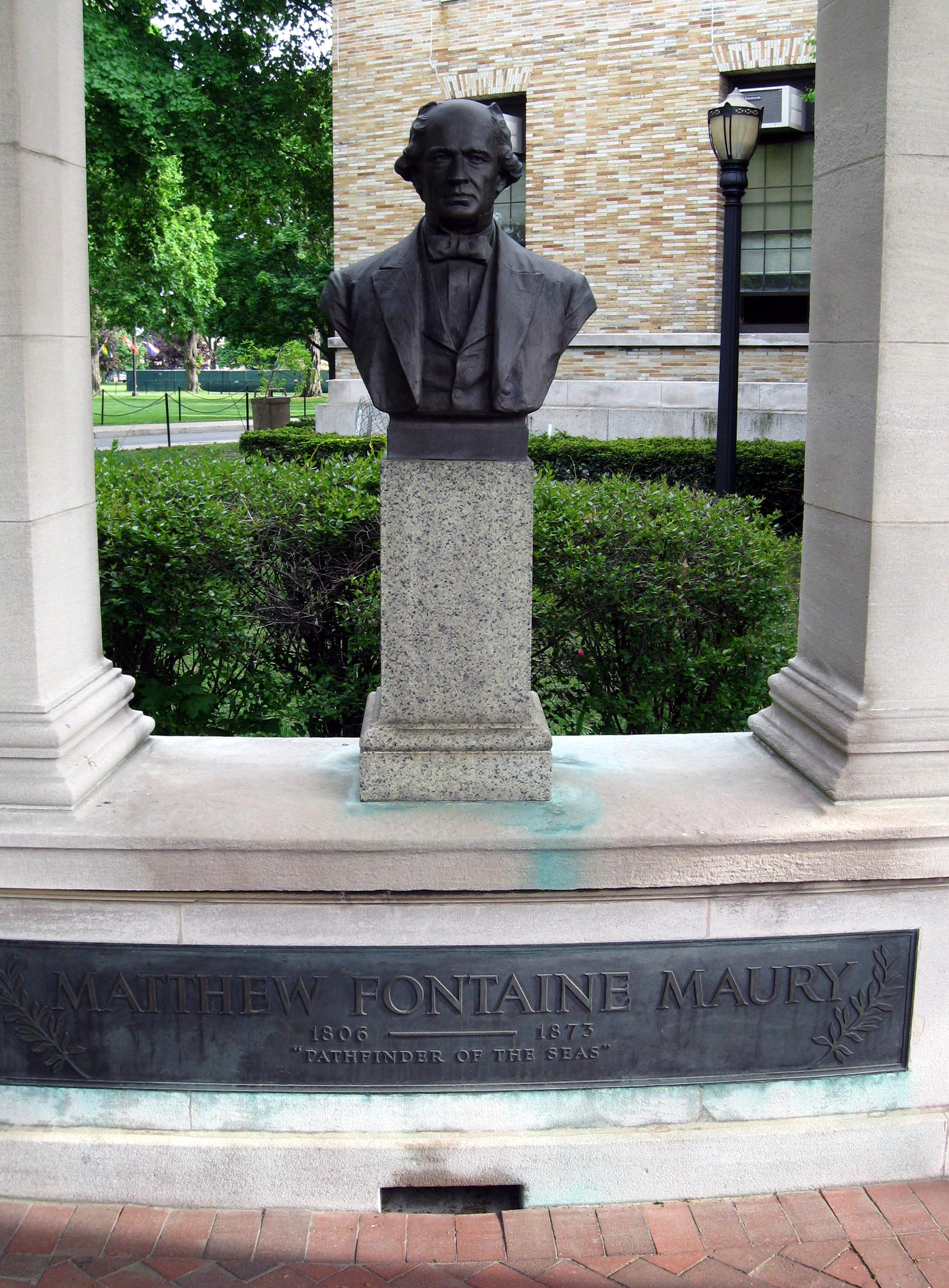
Bust of Maury in the Hall of Fame for Great Americans, New York City

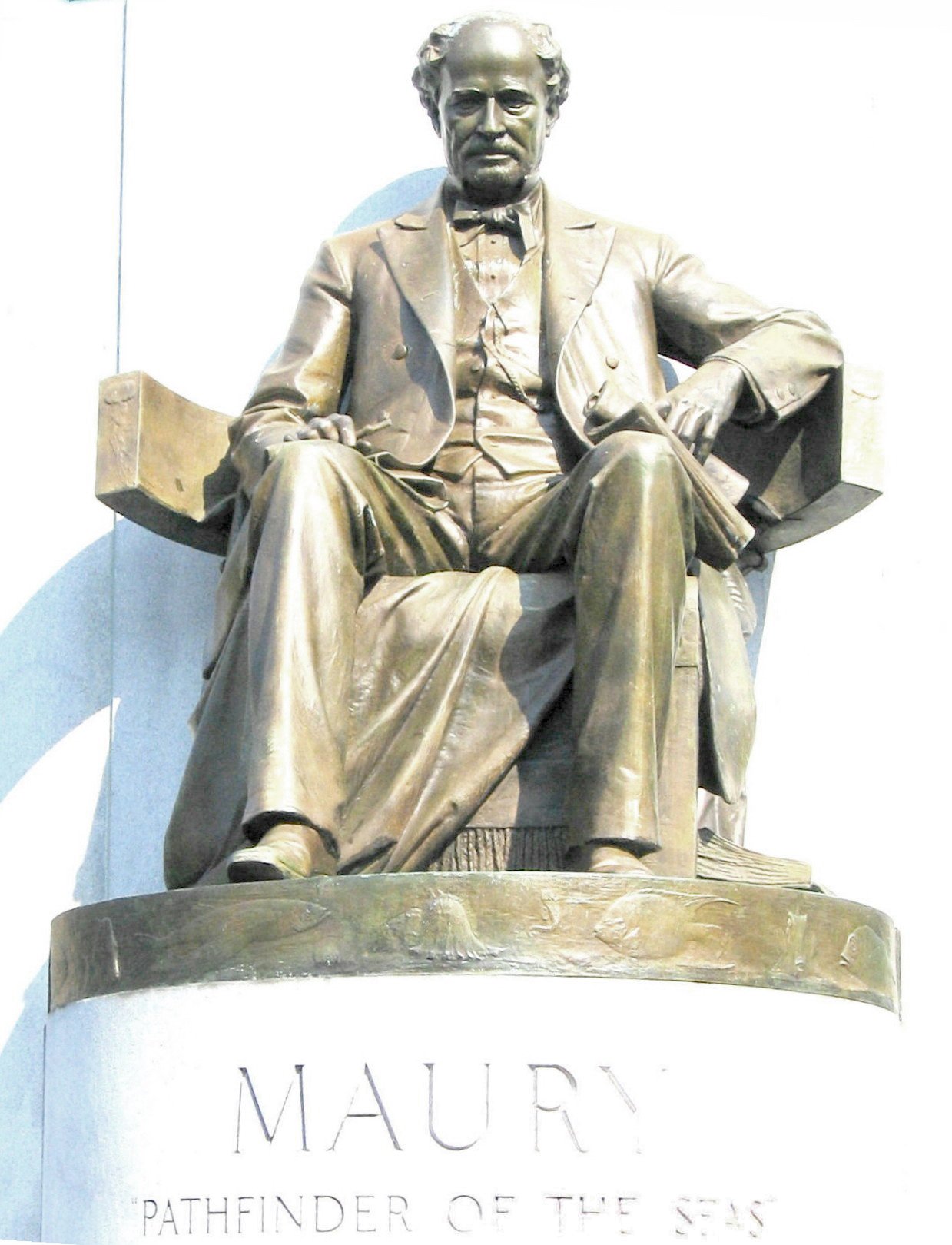
Pathfinder of the Seas monument, Monument Avenue, Richmond, Virginia. Dedicated November 11, 1929. Removed July 2, 2020.

Bust of Maury over the main entrance of the Deutsche Seewarte (Maritime Observatory) in Hamburg, destroyed in World War II.

== Selected Publications ==
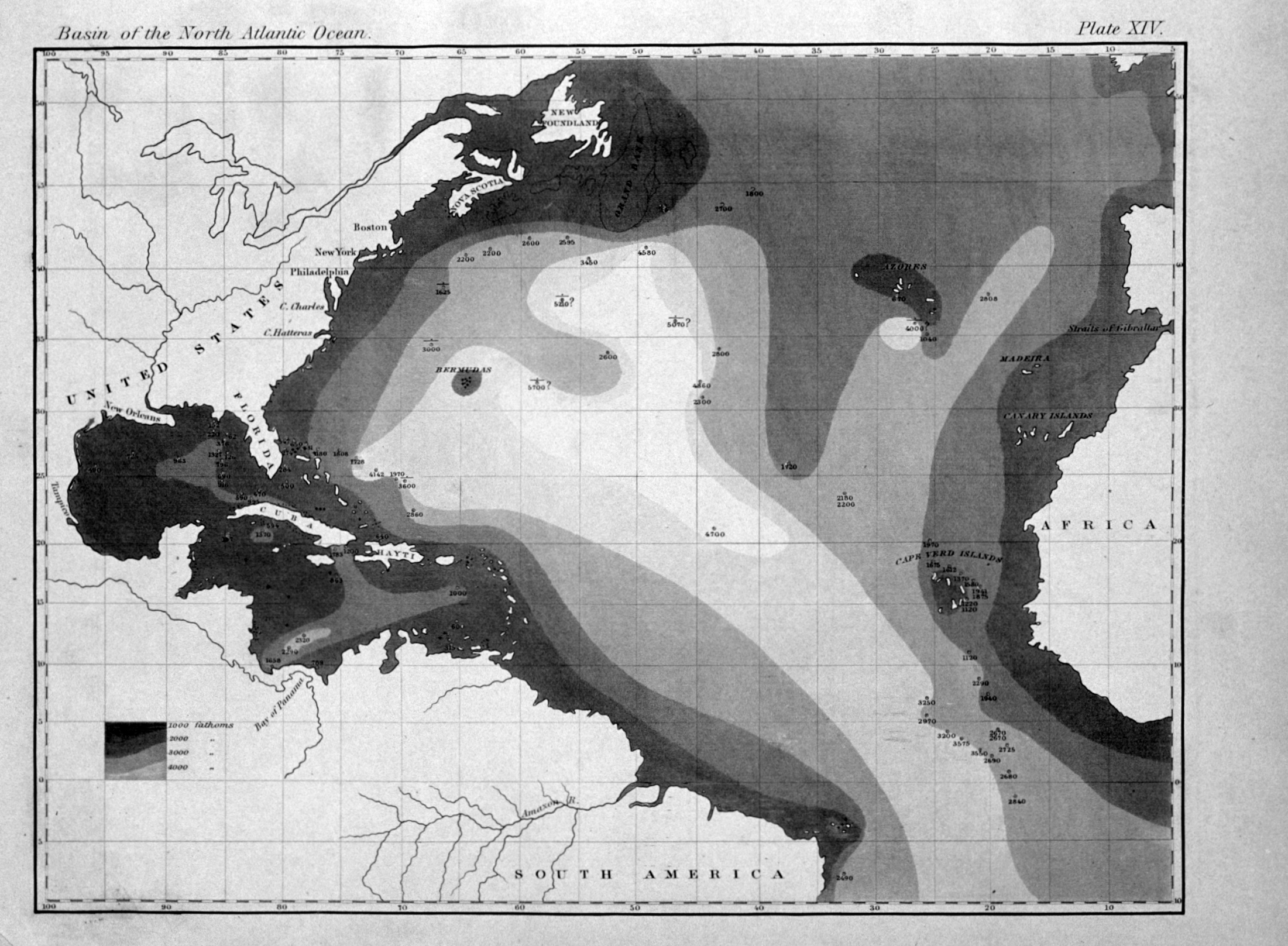
First printed map of oceanic bathymetry, published by Maury in Explanations with data from USS Dolphin (1836)

- Maury, M.F. (1834). "On the Navigation of Cape Horn". American Journal of Science and Arts. 26 (1): 54–63.
- Wind and Current Charts. These were published in several series
  - Series A: Track charts
  - Series B: Monsoon and trade winds charts
  - Series C: Pilot charts
  - Series D: Thermal Sheets
  - Series E: Storm and rain charts
  - Series F: Whale charts
- Explanations and Sailing Directions. Two editions of Notices to Mariners by Maury were published in 1850. A third edition, entitled Explanations and Sailing Directions to Accompany the Wind and Current Charts was published in 1851. The final edition, the eighth was published in two volumes, Volume 1 in 1858 and Volume 2 in 1859.
- The Physical Geography of the Sea. First edition, 1855. The book was published in numerous editions, not all numbered. The last edition revised by Maury was the Eighth edition, 1860. John Leighly provides useful information on the various editions in his introduction to the 1963 reprint of the work.
- Maury, Matthew Fontaine (1851). On the Probable Relation Between Magnetism and the Circulation of the Atmosphere. C. Alexander, Printer.
- Maury, Matthew Fontaine (1853). The Amazon, and the Atlantic Slopes of South America: A Series of Letters A series of letters published in the National intelligencer and Union newspapers, under the signature of "Inca,". Franck Taylor.
- Maury, Matthew Fontaine (1862). "Captain Maury's letter on American affairs". Captain Maury's letter on American affairs. : Hon. J.C. Breckinridge's address to the people of Kentucky. Ex-Gov. Lowe's letter to the Virginia legislature. Address of Geo. N. Sanders to the democracy of the Nohth-west [sic]. Gov. Letcher's message to the Virginia legislature. Message of Jefferson Davis to the Confederate Congress. Baltimore.
- Maury, Matthew Fontaine (1907). Maury's New Elements of Geography for Primary and Intermediate Classes. American Book Company.
- Maury, Matthew Fontaine (1868). First Lessons in Geography. Maury's Geographical Series. 1878 Edition
- Maury, Matthew Fontaine (1874). The World We Live in. University Publishing Company.
- Maury, Matthew Fontaine (1899). Elementary Geography: Designed for Primary and Intermediate Classes. University Publishing Company. Revised and Abridged from First Lessons and World we Live In
- Maury, Matthew Fontaine (1871). Address of Com. M. F. Maury, before the fair of the Agricultural & Mechanical Soc. of Memphis, Tenn. Delivered at the fair grounds Oct. 17th, 1871. Memphis, TN: Appeal Job Office.
- Maury, Matthew Fontaine (1868). Physical Survey of Virginia: Geographical Position of Its Commercial Advantages and National Importance. W.A.R. Nye, printer.
- Maury, Matthew Fontaine (1878). Physical Survey of Virginia: Her Resources, Climate and Productions. Preliminary Report. No. II. Richmond, VA: N.V. Randolph.

== See also ==
- Bathymetric chart
- Flying Cloud
- National Institute for the Promotion of Science
- Oceanography
- Prophet Without Honor

== Cited works ==
- Corbin, Diana Fontaine Maury (1888). A Life of Matthew Fontaine Maury. London: Sampson Low, Marston, Searle, & Rivington.
- Grady, John (2015). Matthew Fontaine Maury, Father of Oceanography: A Biography, 1806-1873. Jefferson, NC: McFarland. ISBN 978-0-7864-7821-7.
- Hearn, Chester (2002). Tracks in the sea: Matthew Fontaine Maury and the Mapping of the Oceans. Camden, Me: International Marine/McGraw-Hill. ISBN 0071368264.
- Lewis, Charles Lee (1927). Matthew Fontaine Maury: The Pathfinder of the Seas. Annapolis: The United States Naval Institute. There is also a 1980 reprint of this title, published by Ayer Publishing, ISBN 978-0-405-13045-8
- Maury, M.F. (1855). The Physical Geography of the Sea. New York: Harper and Brothers.
- Maury, Matthew Fontaine (1963). Leighly, John (ed.). The Physical Geography of the Sea: And Its Meteorology. Cambridge, Massuchusetts: Belknap Press of Harvard University Press. LCCN 63-10870.
- Spencer, Warren F. (1983). The Confederate Navy in Europe. University of Alabama Press. ISBN 978-0-8173-0861-2.
- Williams, Frances Leigh (1963). Matthew Fontaine Maury: Scientist of the Sea. New Brunswick: Rutgers University Press.
