= National Institute for the Promotion of Science =

The National Institution for the Promotion of Science organization was established in Washington, D.C., in May 1840, and was heir to the mantle of the earlier Columbian Institute for the Promotion of Arts and Sciences. The National Institution for the Promotion of Science was later renamed the National Institute and eventually became a part of the Smithsonian Institution.

The National Institute was the initial repository for collections of artifacts brought to the US by the United States Exploring Expedition, as well as various other object accumulated by the government, such as items owned by early American politicians, patent models, and natural objects. Housed in the Patent Office Building, these were the precursor to the Smithsonian Institution collection.

The cabinet was managed by a group of scientists in 1840 and others to secure control of the Smithson bequest and create a National Museum in Washington.

Among those who were elected as corresponding members were such distinguished men as:

- Matthew Fontaine Maury 1st superintendent of the United States Naval Observatory in Washington, D.C.,
- Jacob Whitman Bailey, professor of chemistry and mineralogy at the U.S. Military Academy at West Point;
- Professor Joseph Henry, of the College of New Jersey, at Princeton;
- Alexander Dallas Bache, president of Girard College of Orphans, Philadelphia;
- Denison Olmsted, professor of natural history at Yale College;

Foreign scientists were also represented:

- Professor Charles Wheatstone of King's College, London
- Adolphe Quetelet, the astronomer royal of Belgium;
- Professor Friedrich Georg Wilhelm von Struve, director of the Russian Imperial Central Observatory near St. Petersburg.
