= Jacob Whitman Bailey =

American naturalist (1811–1857)

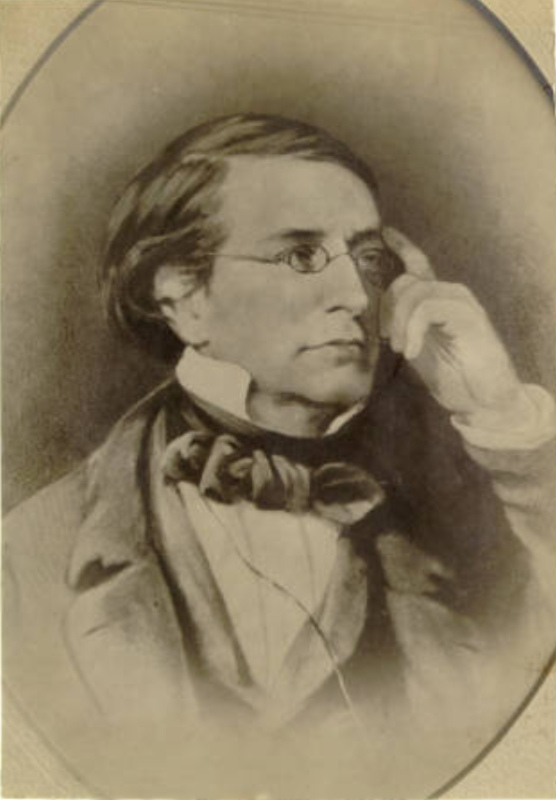

Personal details
- Born: April 29, 1811 Auburn, Massachusetts
- Died: February 26, 1857 (aged 45) West Point, New York
- Spouse: Maria Slaughter (m. 1835; died 1852)
- Children: 3
- Education: West Point
- Occupation: Naturalist

Jacob Whitman Bailey (1811–1857) was an American naturalist, known as the pioneer in microscopic research in America.

== Biography ==
Jacob Whitman Bailey was born in Auburn, Massachusetts on April 29, 1811.

In 1832 he graduated from West Point, where, after 1834, he was successively assistant professor, acting professor, and professor of chemistry, mineralogy, and geology.

At West Point he studied with John Torrey. He devised various improvements in the construction of the microscope and made an extensive collection of microscopic objects and of algae, which he left to the Boston Society of Natural History.

In 1857 he was president of the American Association for the Advancement of Science, as well as a member of the National Institute for the Promotion of Science, a precursor to the Smithsonian Institution. He was elected an associate fellow of the American Academy of Arts and Sciences (AAAS) in 1845. He was elected to the American Philosophical Society in 1852.

Bailey and his son William were survivors of the steamboat Henry Clay disaster on July 28, 1852, though his wife and daughter, both named Maria, were among the casualties.

He wrote many articles on scientific subjects for the American Journal of Science and for scientific societies, a report on the infusorial fossils of California, and a valuable volume of Microscopical Sketches, containing 3000 original figures.

Bailey died on February 26, 1857, at the beginning of his term of office as president of the AAAS. On August 19, 1857, Augustus Addison Gould delivered a speech to the AAAS in commemoration of Bailey's life. The speech was subsequently published in the American Journal of Science and Arts, volume xxv (second series, New Haven, May 1858). The standard author abbreviation Bailey is used to indicate this person as the author when citing a botanical name.

The genus Baileya (desert marigolds), a North American genus of sun-loving wildflowers native to the deserts of northern Mexico and the Southwestern United States, were named by botanists William Henry Harvey and Asa Gray in honor of Bailey, their colleague.

Lieutenant Matthew Fontaine Maury wrote a letter to Bailey inquiring as to the material from the sea floor brought up with Lt. John Mercer Brook's deep-sea soundings and core samples. From this, it was determined that the sea floor where the trans-Atlantic Cable was laid because the samples showed Lieut. M. F. Maury that his "Telegraphic Plateau" was perfect for the underwater cable. The samples Maury sent proved the "Telegraphic Plateau" samples were non-abrasive for such a cable to be laid.

Bailey was buried at the West Point Cemetery.

== Sources ==
- Several editions from 1855 to 1864 that were improved with time as more information was collected entitled "Physical Geography of the Sea" by Matthew Fontaine Maury. Specifically I cite this one: "The Physical Geography of the Sea, and its Meteorology" Eleventh Edition. By M. F. Maury, LL.D. Illustrated with numerous charts and diagrams. SAMPSON LOW, SON & MARSTON, 14 LUDGATE HILL. 1864. (This source is also a full book transcription on https://en.wikisource.org)
- https://en.wikisource.org/wiki/Page:Physical_Geography_of_the_Sea_and_its_Meteorology.djvu/343
- Page 317 section §587. Bailey's letter.
  [Professor Bailey's reply to Lt. Matthew Fontaine Maury on deep sea core samples using Lt. John Mercer Brook's deep sea sounding device and core sampling device. Also see pages 345+
- https://en.wikisource.org/wiki/Page:Physical_Geography_of_the_Sea_and_its_Meteorology.djvu/345
