= List of presidents of the Virginia Bar Association =

President of the Virginia Bar Association
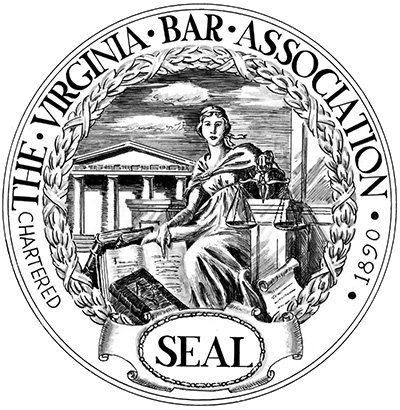
- Seal of the VBA
- Incumbent; Kimberlee Harris Ramsey since January 25, 2025
- Member of: Virginia Bar Association
- Nominator: Board of Governors
- Appointer: Direct popular vote by the members of the association
- Term length: One year
- Constituting instrument: Bylaws of The Virginia Bar Association
- Formation: July 6, 1888 (138 years ago)
- First holder: William J. Robertson
- Website: Official website

The president of The Virginia Bar Association is the chief executive officer of the Virginia Bar Association (VBA), the Commonwealth's voluntary statewide bar association. The president is the Association's chief spokesman and presides at all meetings of its members. Every year, a slate of candidates are nominated by the organization's Board of Governors. At the annual full meeting of the Association's members, a president-elect is chosen by direct popular vote from among the nominees. At the adjournment of the succeeding year's annual meeting, the president-elect is then sworn in as president. In the event of an emergency such as the death or resignation of the president elected as above, the president-elect discharges the duties of the president. If the president-elect is not available to succeed the president, a temporary replacement is appointed by the Board of Governors, and, if necessary, both a new president and president-elect are elected at the next annual meeting.

After the VBA's foundation in July 1888, William J. Robertson of Charlottesville became its first president. The presidency has a term of only one year. From 1888 to 1975, the VBA annual meeting was held during the summer. From 1975 onwards, it has been held in January.

A total of 137 people have served as the president of the Virginia Bar Association since its formation. Kimberlee Harris Ramsey is the current president.

== List of presidents ==
List of presidents from 1888 to 2025
No.	Year(s) of Presidency	Name	Portrait	Residence	Reference(s)
1	1888–1889	William J. Robertson	An image of William J. Robertson	Charlottesville	
2	1889–1890	Robert Garlick Hill Kean	An image of Robert Garlick Hill Kean	Lynchburg	
3	1890–1891	Edward C. Burks	An image of Edward C. Burks	Bedford	
4	1891–1892	John Randolph Tucker	An image of John Randolph Tucker	Lexington	
5	1892–1893	Robert T. Barton	An image of Robert T. Barton	Winchester	
6	1893–1894	Waller Redd Staples	An image of Waller Redd Staples	Christiansburg	
7	1894–1895	Charles Minor Blackford	An image of Charles Minor Blackford	Lynchburg	
8	1895–1896	Robert M. Hughes	An image of Robert M. Hughes	Norfolk	
9	1896–1897	William Wirt Henry	An image of William Wirt Henry	Richmond	
10	1897–1898	William B. Pettit	An image of William B. Pettit	Palmyra	
11	1898–1899	John Goode	An image of John Goode	Bedford	
12	1899–1900	William J. Leake	An image of William J. Leake	Richmond	
13	1900	William Alexander Anderson	An image of William Alexander Anderson	Lexington	
14	1900–1901	Lunsford L. Lewis	An image of Lunsford L. Lewis	Richmond	
15	1901–1902	Thomas C. Elder		Staunton	
16	1902–1903	Samuel C. Graham	An image of Samuel C. Graham	Tazewell	
17	1903–1904	Alexander Hamilton	An image of Alexander Hamilton	Petersburg	
18	1904–1905	Alfred P. Thom	An image of Alfred P. Thom	Norfolk	
19	1905–1906	Archer Allen Phlegar		Bristol	
20	1906–1907	Allen Caperton Braxton	An image of Allen Caperton Braxton	Staunton	
21	1907–1908	Wyndham R. Meredith		Richmond	
22	1908–1909	Micajah Woods	An image of Micajah Woods	Charlottesville	
23	1909–1910	R. Walton Moore	An image of R. Walton Moore	Fredericksburg	
24	1910–1911	George Llewellyn Christian	An image of George Llewellyn Christian	Richmond	
25	1911–1912	Joshua Fry Bullitt Jr.	An image of Joshua Fry Bullitt Jr.	Big Stone Gap	
26	1912–1913	William Minor Lile	An image of William Minor Lile	Charlottesville	
27	1913–1914	Samuel Griffin		Bedford	
28	1914–1915	Legh R. Watts	An image of Legh R. Watts	Portsmouth	
29	1915–1916	Eppa Hunton Jr.	An image of Eppa Hunton Jr.	Richmond	
30	1916	John B. Jenkins		Norfolk	
31	1916–1918	Harvey T. Hall		Roanoke	
32	1918–1919	Lucien H. Cocke		Roanoke	
33	1919–1920	Randolph Harrison		Lynchburg	
34	1920–1921	Armistead C. Gordon	An image of Armistead C. Gordon	Staunton	
35	1921–1922	A. W. Wallace		Fredericksburg	
36	1922–1923	Edward P. Buford		Lawrenceville	
37	1923–1924	George Bryan		Richmond	
38	1924–1925	Robert B. Tunstall		Richmond	
39	1925–1926	John Randolph Tucker	An image of John Randolph Tucker	Richmond	
40	1926–1927	R. Gray Williams		Winchester	
41	1927–1928	James H. Corbitt		Suffolk	
42	1928–1929	Whitwell W. Coxe		Roanoke	
43	1929–1930	J. Gordon Bohannon		Petersburg	
44	1930–1931	Robert L. Pennington		Bristol	
45	1931–1932	Virginius R. Shackelford		Orange	
46	1932–1933	James W. Gordon		Richmond	
47	1933–1934	S. V. Kemp		Lynchburg	
48	1934–1935	C. O'Conor Goolrick	An image of C. O'Conor Goolrick	Fredericksburg	
49	1935–1936	Stuart Bland Campbell		Wytheville	
50	1936–1937	James Green Martin		Norfolk	
51	1937–1938	Frank W. Rogers		Roanoke	
52	1938–1939	Lewis Catlett Williams		Richmond	
53	1939–1940	Robert O. Norris Jr.	An image of Robert O. Norris Jr.	Lively	
54	1940–1941	Kennon C. Whittle		Martinsville	
55	1941–1942	William A. Stuart		Abingdon	
56	1942–1943	George E. Haw		Richmond	
57	1943–1944	Christopher B. Garnett		Arlington	
58	1944–1946	Howard C. Gilmer Jr.		Pulaski	
59	1946–1947	Thomas B. Gay	An image of Thomas B. Gay	Richmond	
60	1947–1948	John L. Walker		Roanoke	
61	1948–1949	David Nelson Sutton		West Point	
62	1949–1950	James S. Easley		Halifax	
63	1950–1951	W. R. Broaddus Jr.		Martinsville	
64	1951–1952	Alex W. Parker		Richmond	
65	1952–1953	Fred B. Greear		Norton	
66	1953–1954	T. Justin Moore		Richmond	
67	1954–1955	Michael B. Wagenheim		Norfolk	
68	1955–1956	F. D. G. Ribble		Charlottesville	
69	1956–1957	Edwin B. Meade		Danville	
70	1957–1958	J. Sloan Kuykendall		Winchester	
71	1958–1959	David J. Mays		Richmond	
72	1959–1960	William P. Dickson Jr.		Norfolk	
73	1960–1961	Robert J. McCandlish Jr.		Fairfax	
74	1961–1962	William T. Muse		Richmond	
75	1962–1963	Waldo G. Miles		Bristol	
76	1963–1964	Thomas C. Gordon		Richmond	
77	1964–1965	Virginius R. Shackelford Jr.		Orange	
78	1965–1966	George M. Cochran	An image of George M. Cochran	Staunton	
79	1966–1967	A. C. Epps		Richmond	
80	1967–1968	William A. Moncure		Alexandria	
81	1968–1969	George R. C. Stuart	An image of George R. C. Stuart	Abingdon	
82	1969–1970	Toy D. Savage Jr.	An image of Toy D. Savage Jr.	Norfolk	
83	1970–1971	E. Waller Dudley		Alexandria	
84	1971–1972	John S. Davenport III		Richmond	
85	1972–1973	Vernon M. Geddy Jr.		Williamsburg	
86	1973–1975	W. Gibson Harris		Richmond	
87	1975	Thomas V. Monahan		Winchester	
88	1976	William B. Spong Jr.	An image of William B. Spong Jr.	Portsmouth	
89	1977	A. Hugo Blankingship Jr.		Fairfax	
90	1978	Edward R. Slaughter Jr.		Charlottesville	
91	1979	Jesse B. Wilson III		Fairfax	
92	1980	Lorenzo Lee Bean Jr.		Arlington	
93	1981	Hugh L. Patterson		Norfolk	
94	1982	John F. Kay Jr.		Richmond	
95	1983	John L. Walker Jr.		Roanoke	
96	1984	George G. Grattan IV		Earlysville	
97	1985	Evans B. Brasfield		Richmond	
98	1986	Edmund L. Walton Jr.		McLean	
99	1987	R. Gordon Smith		Richmond	
100	1988	John M. Ryan		Norfolk	
101	1989	Thomas T. Lawson		Roanoke	
102	1990	F. Claiborne Johnston Jr.		Richmond	
103	1991	Allen C. Goolsby		Richmond	
104	1992	Thomas C. Brown Jr.		McLean	
105	1993	Whittington W. Clement		Danville	
106	1994	M. Langhorne Keith		Fairfax	
107	1995	R. Terrence Ney		Fairfax	
108	1996	Douglas P. Rucker Jr.		Richmond	
109	1997	Phillip C. Stone Sr.		Bridgewater	
110	1998	G. Franklin Flippin		Roanoke	
111	1999	David Craig Landin		Richmond	
112	2000	Anita O. Poston		Norfolk	
113	2001	Jeanne F. Franklin		Alexandria	
114	2002	J. Edward Betts		Richmond	
115	2003	Frank A. Thomas III		Orange	
116	2004	E. Tazewell Ellett		Alexandria	
117	2005	James V. Meath		Richmond	
118	2006	William R. Van Buren III		Norfolk	
119	2007	Glenn C. Lewis		Washington, D.C.	
120	2008	G. Michael Pace Jr.		Roanoke	
121	2009	John D. Epps		Richmond	
122	2010	Stephen D. Busch		Richmond	
123	2011	Lucia Anna Trigiani		Alexandria	
124	2012	Hugh M. Fain III		Richmond	
125	2013	Thomas R. Bagby		Roanoke	
126	2014	John L. Walker III		Richmond	
127	2015	Harry M. Johnson III		Richmond	
128	2016	James Patrick Guy II		Richmond	
129	2017	David S. Mercer		Alexandria	
130	2018	C. J. Steuart Thomas III		Staunton	
131	2019	Richard E. Garriott Jr.		Virginia Beach	
132	2020	Alison M. McKee		Virginia Beach	
133	2021	Richard H. Ottinger		Norfolk	
134	2022	Victor O. Cardwell		Roanoke	
135	2023	Benjamin D. Leigh		Leesburg	
136	2024	W. Ryan Snow		Norfolk	
137	2025	Kimberlee Harris Ramsey		Richmond	

== See also ==
- List of presidents of the American Bar Association
