= William Wirt Henry =

American politician, lawyer, and historian from Virginia (1831-1900)

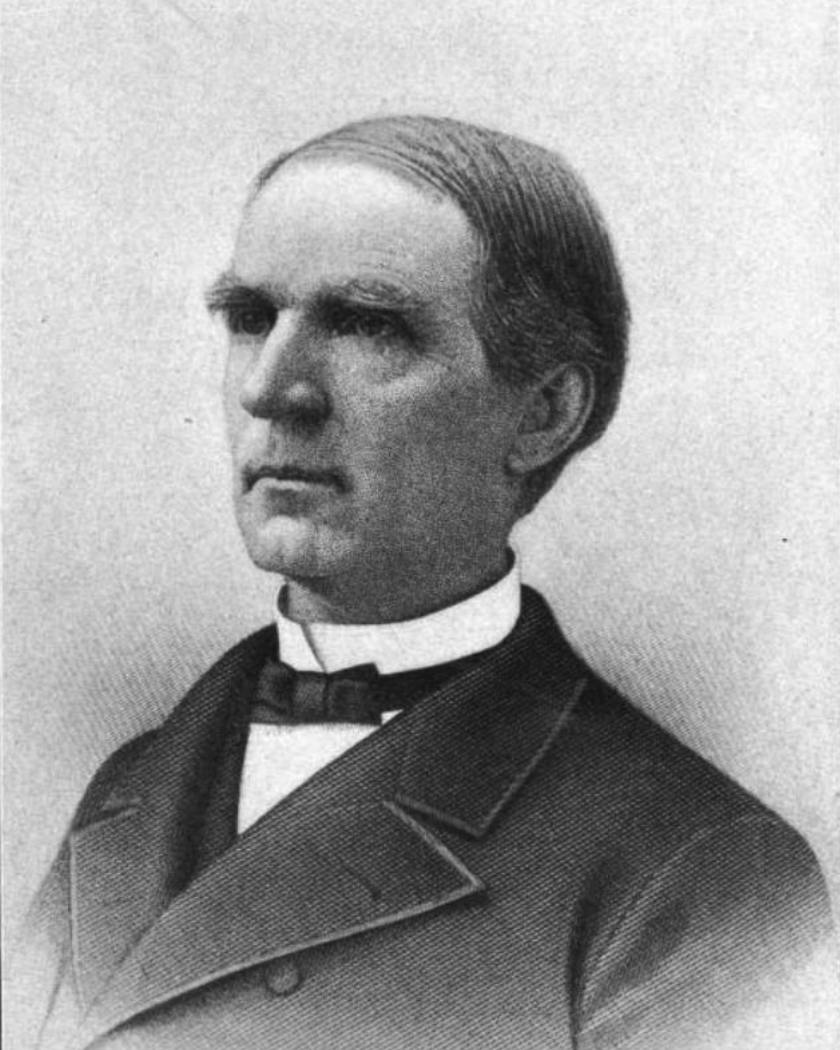

9th President of the Virginia Bar Association
- In office July 16, 1896 – August 5, 1897
- Preceded by: Robert M. Hughes
- Succeeded by: William B. Pettit

Member of the Virginia Senate from the 35th district
- In office December 3, 1879 – December 7, 1881
- Succeeded by: William Lovenstein

Member of the Virginia House of Delegates from Richmond City
- In office December 5, 1877 – December 3, 1879
- Preceded by: W. S. Gilman
- Succeeded by: S. B. Witt

Personal details
- Born: William Wirt Henry; February 14, 1831 Red Hill, Charlotte, Virginia, U.S.
- Died: December 5, 1900 (aged 69) Richmond, Virginia, U.S.
- Resting place: Hollywood Cemetery
- Party: Democratic
- Spouse: Lucy Gray Marshall (m. 1854)
- Education: University of Virginia

Military service
- Allegiance: Confederate States
- Branch/service: Confederate States Army
- Battles/wars: American Civil War

William Wirt Henry (February 14, 1831 – December 5, 1900) was a Virginia lawyer, politician, historian, writer, and a biographer of his grandfather Patrick Henry. Henry served in both houses of the Virginia General Assembly and as president of The Virginia Bar Association and the American Historical Association.

== Biography ==
Born at Red Hill in Charlotte County, Virginia, Henry graduated from the University of Virginia, and was admitted to the bar in 1853. He served in the Confederate Army. After the War, he moved his practice to Richmond in 1873, and specialized in appellate advocacy, and was elected two terms in the Virginia House of Delegates and a term in the Senate of Virginia. He was a charter member of the Virginia Society of the Sons of the American Revolution and served as its first president from 1890 to 1897.

Henry served as president of the American Historical Association in 1891, and was president of the Virginia Historical Society for 1891–1892. Henry collected and wrote a three-volume work, Patrick Henry: Life, Correspondence and Speeches, of which the first volume was first published in 1891. Henry also wrote on the trials of Aaron Burr and Jefferson Davis. He also wrote widely cited articles about Captain John Smith and Sir Walter Raleigh. Henry was elected a member of the American Antiquarian Society in 1893.

Henry served as president of The Virginia Bar Association in 1896–1897, and was a vice-president of the American Bar Association, which included his obituary in its annual report for 1900. Henry received honorary law degrees from both the College of William & Mary and Washington & Lee University.

He died at his home in Richmond on December 5, 1900. He was buried in Hollywood Cemetery.
