= William Pettit =

William Pettit may refer to:

- William B. Pettit, American attorney
- William H. Pettit, New Zealand missionary
