= John B. Jenkins =

American lawyer (1859–1916)

- Born: John Benson Jenkins; September 8, 1859; Norfolk, Virginia, U.S.
- Died: December 7, 1916 (aged 57); Norfolk, Virginia, U.S.
- Education: University of Virginia (MA)
- Occupation: Lawyer
- Political party: Democratic
- Spouse: Eunice Wortham (m. 1888)
- Children: 3

John Benson Jenkins (September 8, 1859 – December 7, 1916) was an American lawyer. He served as president of the Virginia State Bar Association from July 1916 until his suicide the following December.

Legal offices
Preceded by Eppa Hunton Jr.	President of the Virginia State Bar Association; 1916	Succeeded by Harvey T. Hall
