= Charles A. Graves =

American lawyer

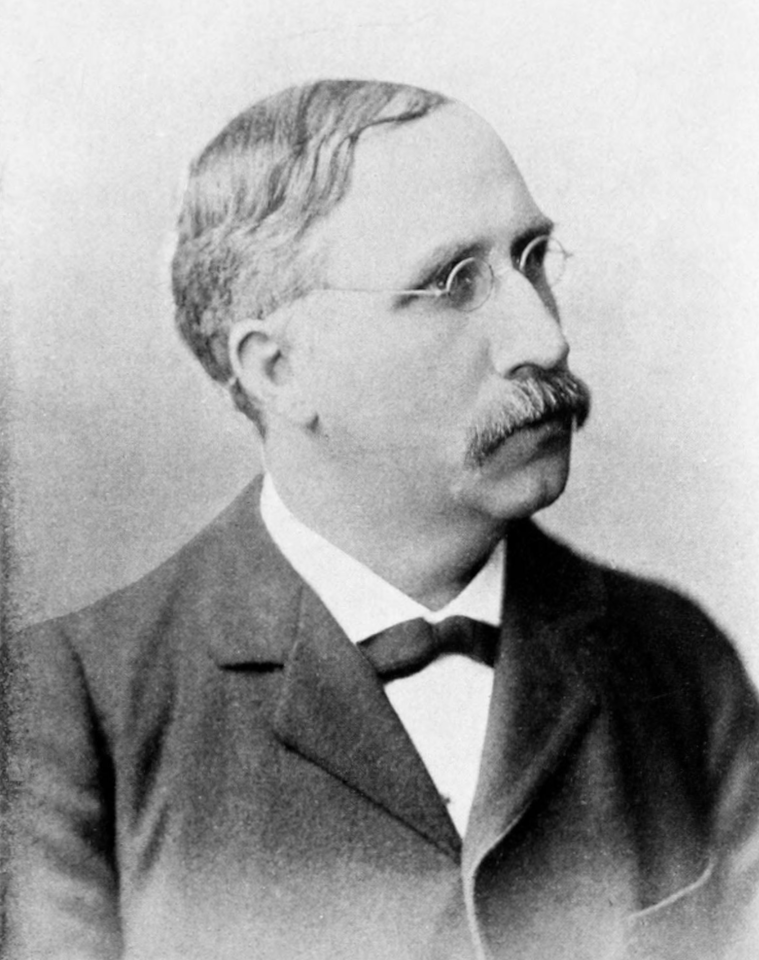
- Born: Charles Alfred Graves; October 20, 1850; Mechums River, Virginia
- Died: November 10, 1928 (aged 78); Charlottesville, Virginia
- Burial place: University of Virginia Cemetery
- Education: Washington and Lee University
- Occupation(s): Legal scholar, professor

Charles Alfred Graves (October 20, 1850 – November 10, 1928) was a legal scholar and law professor, who taught at the law schools of Washington and Lee University and the University of Virginia.

== Biography ==
Charles A. Graves was born on Mechums River in Albemarle County, Virginia on October 20, 1850. He graduated from Washington and Lee, where he studied under John W. Brockenbrough and John Randolph Tucker, then joined the faculty in 1873. From 1875 to 1887, Graves taught alone, while Tucker served in Congress. Tucker returned, then in 1896, a third faculty member was added, John W. Davis. Graves became dean in 1897 upon Tucker's death. From 1899 to 1928, Graves was a professor of law at the University of Virginia.

Graves was a charter member of The Virginia Bar Association in 1890. With Judge Edward C. Burks and Professor William M. Lile, Graves issued the first volume of the Virginia Law Register in May 1895.

In 1907, on the one hundredth anniversary of the birth of Robert E. Lee, Graves gave a poignant speech at the University of Virginia about Lee's years at Washington College. The speech was reprinted in the Alumni Bulletin.

In 1911, Washington and Lee conferred on Graves an honorary doctor of laws degree.

He died at his home in Charlottesville, Virginia on November 10, 1928, and was buried at the University of Virginia Cemetery.
