= Legh R. Watts =

American lawyer (1843–1919)

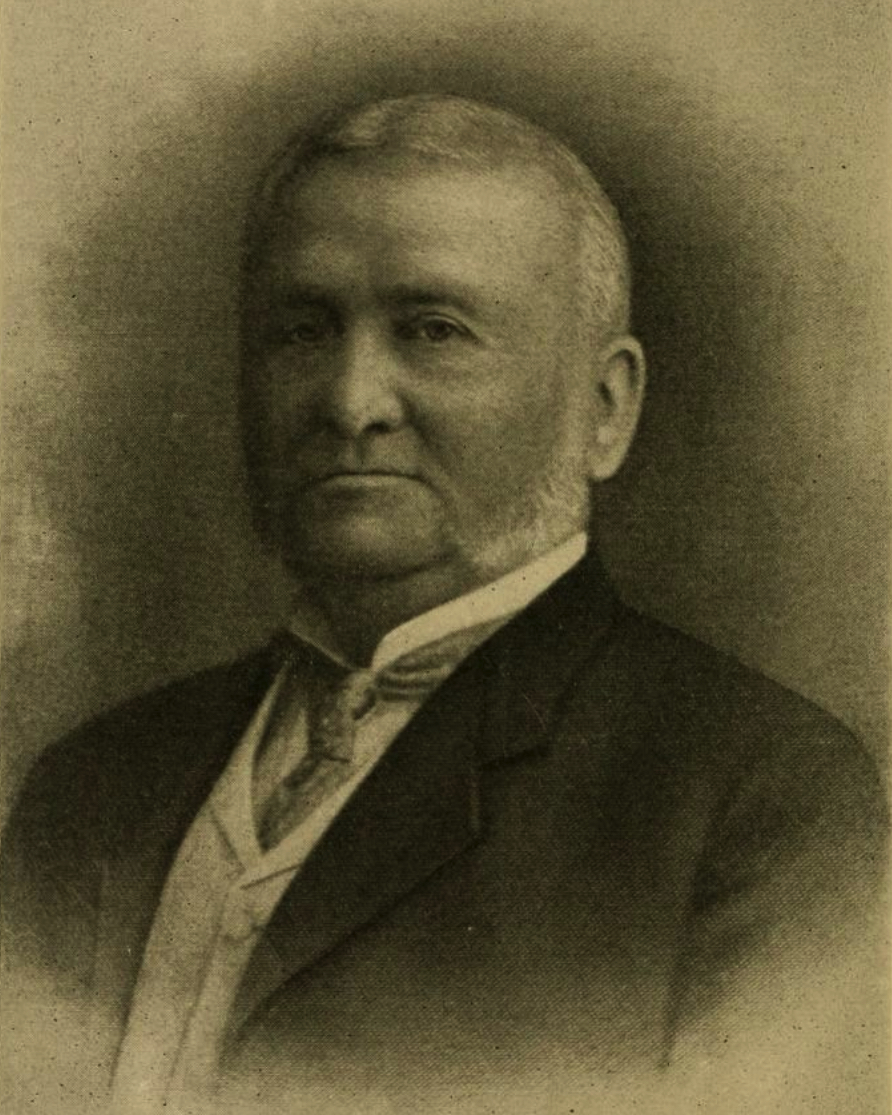
- Portrait of Watts, c. 1910s
- Born: Legh Richmond Watts; December 12, 1843; Portsmouth, Virginia, U.S.
- Died: December 30, 1919 (aged 76); Portsmouth, Virginia, U.S.
- Education: University of Virginia (LLB)
- Occupation: Lawyer
- Political party: Democratic
- Spouse: Mattie Peters (m. 1868)
- Children: 6

Legh Richmond Watts (December 12, 1843 – December 30, 1919) was an American lawyer. A veteran of the American Civil War, he served as president of the Portsmouth, Virginia city council, as president of the Virginia State Bar Association from 1914 to 1915, and as a member of the board of visitors of the University of Virginia.

Legal offices
Preceded by Samuel Griffin	President of the Virginia State Bar Association; 1914–1915	Succeeded by Eppa Hunton Jr.
