= William Minor Lile =

American lawyer and professor (1859–1935)

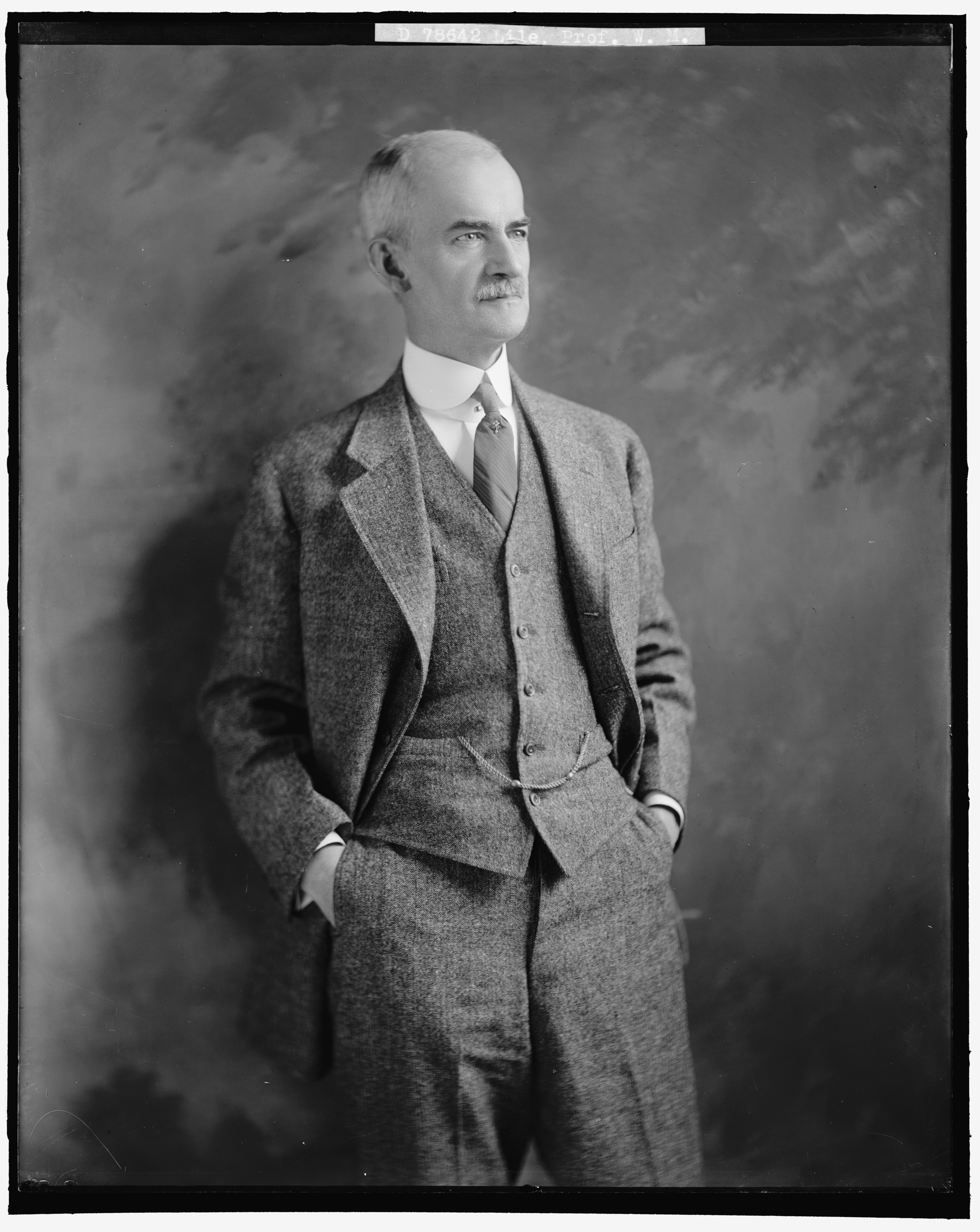
- Portrait of Lile, c. 1923
- Born: William Minor Lile; March 28, 1859; Trinity, Alabama, U.S.
- Died: December 13, 1935 (aged 76); Chesterfield, Virginia, U.S.
- Burial place: University of Virginia Cemetery
- Education: University of Virginia (LLB)
- Occupations: Lawyer; professor
- Title: Dean of the University of Virginia School of Law (1904–1932)
- Spouse: Maud Lee Carson (m. 1888)

William Minor Lile (March 28, 1859 – December 13, 1935) was an American law school professor and administrator. A graduate of the University of Virginia School of Law, he began teaching at that institution in 1893. In 1896, he was made administrative head of the law school, and, in 1904, he became its first dean. Along with Charles A. Graves and Raleigh C. Minor, he worked to modernize the school, requiring two years of undergraduate study for admittance and increasing the length of instruction from one to three years. During his tenure, the faculty also increased from four professors to eight. In 1913, he helped establish the Virginia Law Review. He retired in 1932.

From 1912 to 1913, he served as the president of the Virginia State Bar Association.

Lile died on December 13, 1935, in Chesterfield County, Virginia. He was buried in the University of Virginia Cemetery.

The William Minor Lile Moot Court Competition at U.Va. Law is held annually in his honor and has included many notable participants and judges.

Legal offices
| Preceded by Joshua Fry Bullitt Jr. | President of the Virginia State Bar Association; 1912–1913 | Succeeded by Samuel Griffin |
Academic offices
| Preceded by John B. Minor | Head/Dean of the University of Virginia School of Law; 1896–1932 | Succeeded by Armistead M. Dobie |
