= Thomas Elder (disambiguation) =

Thomas Elder (1818–1897) was a Scottish-Australian pastoralist, businessman, philanthropist and politician.

Thomas Elder may also refer to:

- Murray Elder, Baron Elder (Thomas Murray Elder, born 1950), British Labour politician and member of the House of Lords
- Thomas Elder (lawyer) (1767–1853), Harrisburg lawyer and businessman
- Thomas Elder (Lord Provost of Edinburgh) (1731–1799), Scottish wine merchant
- Thomas C. Elder (1834–1904), Civil War soldier and Virginia lawyer
