= Mary Blackford =

Mary Blackford may refer to:

- Mary Berkeley Minor Blackford (1802–1896), American anti-slavery activist
- Mary Blackford, birth name of Mary Tighe (1772–1810), Irish poet
- Mary Blackford Fowler (1892–1982), American painter and sculptor
