= Robert M. Hughes Memorial Library =

Coordinates: 36°53′14.5″N 76°18′13.6″W

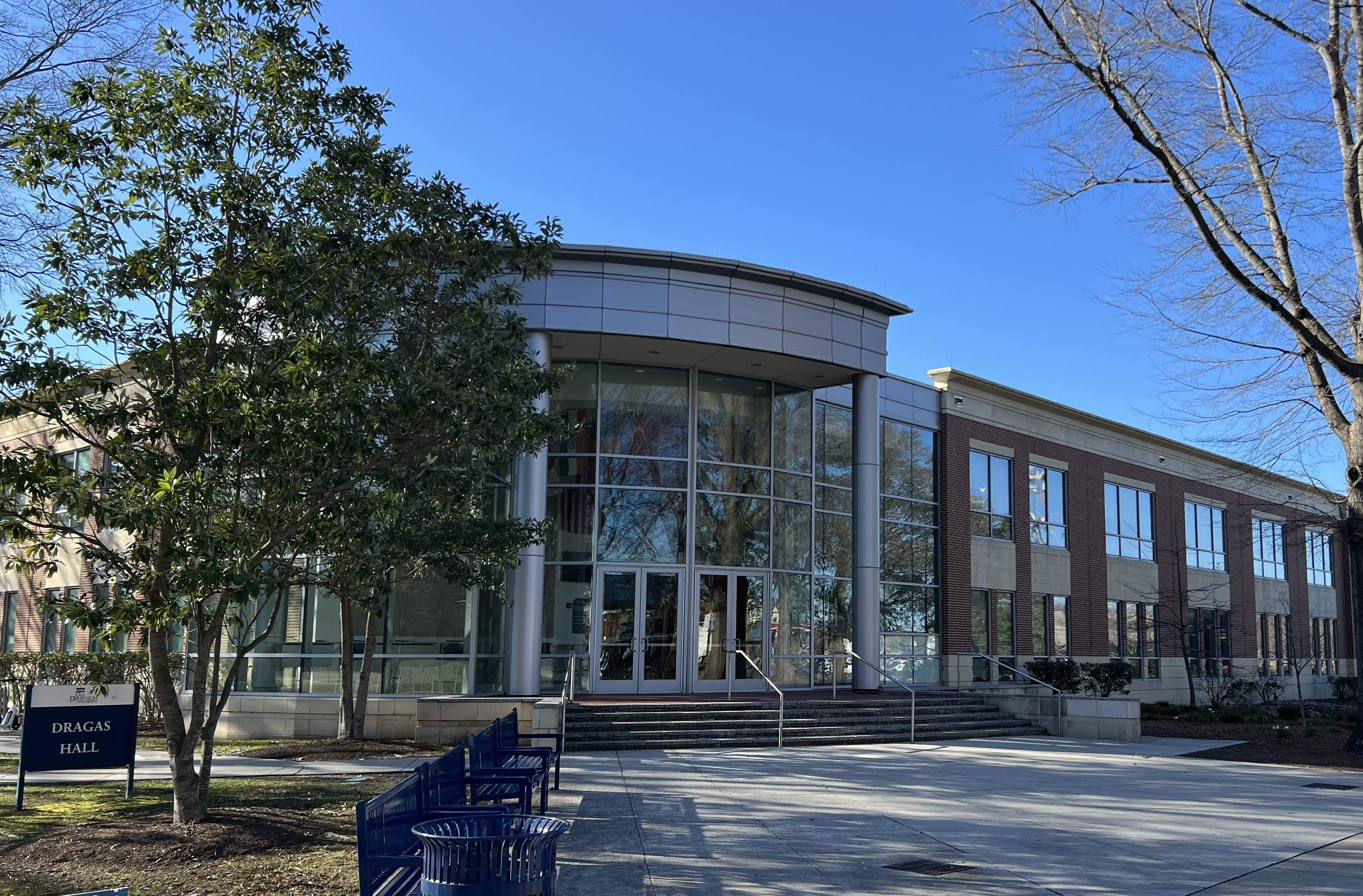
Dragas Hall at Old Dominion University, formerly the library.

Hughes Hall, the former Robert M. Hughes Memorial Library, is a notable building on the Old Dominion University campus in Norfolk, Virginia, designed by Edward Durell Stone in 1959. When the building was dedicated, it was the Norfolk Division of the College of William & Mary. In the book Architecture in Virginia, published by the Virginia Museum of Fine Arts, author William B. O'Neal writes that the building, completely encased in a solar block screen, has a glass interior. While it has practical energy saving benefits, O'Neal says the blocks give "a beautiful unity and a repose not always found in libraries today."

The building was named for Virginia lawyer Robert M. Hughes, who helped establish the Norfolk division of William & Mary in 1930 along with J. A. C. Chandler, Joseph Healy and Albert Foreman It was dedicated with speech on "The Place of the College Library" by historian Louis B. Wright, editor of the colonial diaries of William Byrd II of Westover.

It sits at the corner of Hampton Boulevard and 49th Street in Norfolk. Today it holds many of ODU's Computer Science faculty offices.

Beginning in 2009, the building – which had been renamed to Dragas Hall – was extensively renovated to unify the architectural character of Kaufmann Mall, bring the building into compliance with requirements of the Americans with Disabilities Act, and upgrade the interior for modern technological needs. This resulted in a complete reconfiguration of the building, including the removal of the solar screen, alteration of the roof line, and the addition of a rounded glass atrium. The building now looks significantly different. The new two-story glass atrium was dedicated as the Hughes Atrium in remembrance of Robert M. Hughes for whom the building was originally named.
