= John Minor (politician) =

American lawyer and politician from Virginia (1761–1816)

John Minor Jr.

Personal details
- Born: May 13, 1761 Caroline County, Colony of Virginia, British America
- Died: June 8, 1816 (aged 55) Richmond, Virginia, U.S.
- Resting place: Masonic Cemetery; Fredericksburg, Virginia, U.S.
- Spouse(s): Mary Berkeley (m. 1786; died 1787) Lucy Landon Carter (m. 1793)
- Relations: Matthew Fontaine Maury (grandson); Charles Minor Blackford (grandson)
- Children: 7, including Mary
- Occupation: Politician; lawyer

John Minor Jr. (May 13, 1761 – June 8, 1816) was an American politician and lawyer from Virginia. He served in the Virginia House of Delegates.

== Early life ==
John Minor Jr. was born on May 13, 1761, at Topping Castle in Caroline County, Virginia, to John Minor. His grandfather John Minor was justice of the peace in Spotsylvania County.

== Career ==
Minor was the first commonwealth's attorney for Fredericksburg. He served in the Virginia House of Delegates. In the 1770s or 1780s, he proposed a bill in the Virginia General Assembly for the emancipation of slaves. He was a presidential elector during James Monroe's election.

Minor served as a soldier in the Continental Army during the American Revolutionary War. He attained the rank of general while serving in the War of 1812. He was a slave owner.

== Personal life ==
Minor married Mary Berkeley, daughter of Nelson Berkeley, of Airwell, Hanover County, Virginia, in February 1786. His wife died in 1787. He married Lucy Landon Carter, daughter of Landon Carter, of Cleve, King George County, Virginia, on December 12, 1793. They had seven children, including Lucian, Mary Berkeley, Lancelot Byrd and John. His grandsons were Matthew Fontaine Maury and Charles Minor Blackford. He lived at Hazel Hill on Princess Anne Street in Fredericksburg. He was friends with James Monroe.

Minor died on June 8, 1816, in Richmond. He was interred at the family burial ground at Hazel Hill (Sligo). He was reinterred at the Masonic Cemetery in Fredericksburg on December 29, 1855.
