= Micajah Woods =

American lawyer (1844–1911)

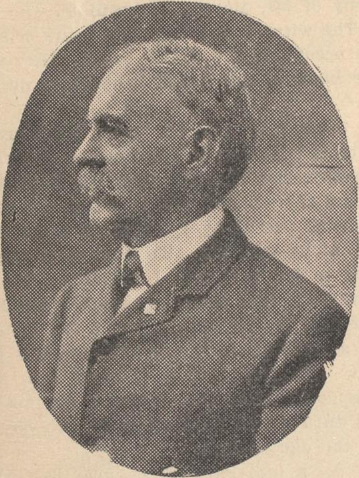
- Woods in 1904 publication
- Born: May 17, 1844; Albemarle County, Virginia, U.S.
- Died: March 14, 1911 (aged 66)
- Education: University of Virginia School of Law (LLB)
- Occupation: Lawyer
- Known for: Lawyer of murderer J. Samuel McCue
- Children: Maud Coleman Woods

Micajah Woods (May 17, 1844 – March 14, 1911) was a Virginia lawyer, who served as the Commonwealth's Attorney in Charlottesville, Virginia for 41 years, and was a president of The Virginia Bar Association.

Woods began life in Albemarle County, Virginia. He was educated at the Lewisburg Academy, the military school taught by Colonel John Bowie Strange, and the Bloomfield Academy. Woods joined the Confederate Army in August 1861 at the age of seventeen as a volunteer on the staff of John B. Floyd. Not yet of military age, he spent the winter of 1861-62 at the University of Virginia and then joined the 2nd Virginia Cavalry. In 1863, he became a First Lieutenant in Thomas E. Jackson's Battery, Virginia Horse Artillery, and saw action at Gettysburg, New Market, and Cold Harbor.

Woods returned to the University after the war and in 1868 earned a Bachelor of Laws degree. He practiced in Charlottesville and became Commonwealth's Attorney in 1870. In 1872 he was made a member of the board of visitors of the University of Virginia, a position which he held for four years, at the time of his appointment being the youngest member of the board ever selected. Woods served as president of The Virginia Bar Association in 1909. He was a member of the board of visitors of Virginia Tech in 1911.

Woods is remembered locally as the prosecuting attorney in the murder trial of J. Samuel McCue, a three-term Mayor of Charlottesville who was convicted of murdering his wife then became the last man to be hanged in Albemarle County, and as the father of Maud Coleman Woods, the first "Miss America," at least for the Pan-American Exposition of 1901. He is also remembered for his role in attempting to legitimate the lynching of John Henry James, whom Woods indicted posthumously. In 2023, at the request of Albemarle Commonwealth Attorney Jim Hingeley, Woods's indictment was dismissed, with the court noting that "[t]he indictment was not an instrument of justice; it was used as a sanction and to approve the lynching of a man simply because he was Black."
