= Robert Garlick Hill Kean =

American lawyer

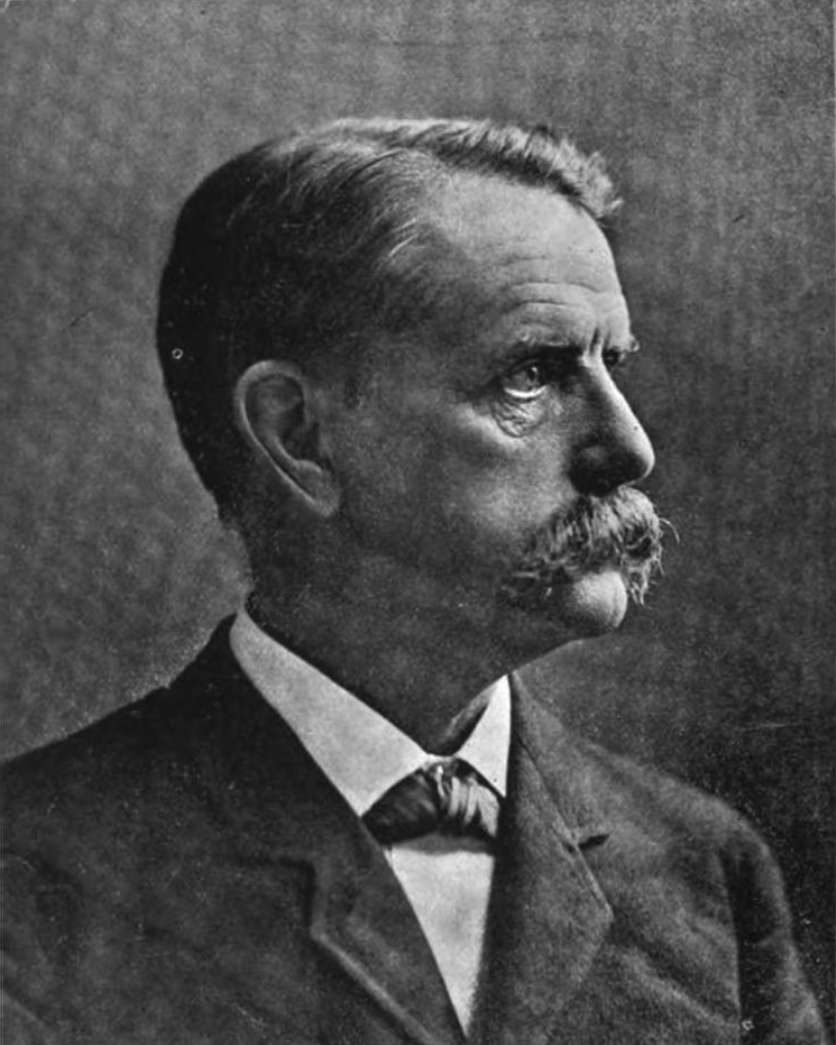

2nd President of the Virginia Bar Association
- In office July 25, 1889 – July 3, 1890
- Preceded by: William J. Robertson
- Succeeded by: Edward C. Burks

Confederate States of America Chief of the Bureau of War
- In office March 1862 – April 1865
- President: Jefferson Davis

Personal details
- Born: Robert Garlick Hill Kean; October 28, 1828 Caroline, Virginia, U.S.
- Died: June 13, 1898 (aged 69) Lynchburg, Virginia, U.S.
- Party: Democratic
- Spouses: Jane Randolph (m. 1854) Adelaide Prescott (m. 1874)
- Education: University of Virginia

Military service
- Allegiance: Confederate States
- Branch/service: Confederate States Army
- Years of service: 1861–1862, 1862–1865
- Rank: Captain
- Battles/wars: American Civil War

Robert Garlick Hill Kean (October 7, 1828 – June 13, 1898) was a Virginia lawyer. A Confederate States Army officer and bureaucrat during the American Civil War, he helped promulgate the Lost Cause of the Confederacy after the war, particularly since he became one of the last surviving members of the Confederate States bureaucracy. His wartime diary, published long after his death, provides insights into the inner workings of the Confederate government.

== Early and family life ==
Kean was born to Caroline M. Kean (1802-1831) on October 24, 1828, at "Mt. Airy" plantation in Caroline County, Virginia, the residence of her father, Col. Humphrey Hill (1766-1841), who in 1820 owned 25 enslaved persons but by 1840 would only own 4 slaves. His paternal grandfather, Dr. Andrew Kean (1775-1837) of "Cedar Plains" plantation in neighboring Goochland County, had studied medicine at Trinity College Dublin before emigrating from Ireland to Louisa County, Virginia with his father. Dr. Kean reportedly declined Thomas Jefferson's offer of a professor's chair at the newly established University of Virginia (from which his grandson would receive both undergraduate and legal degrees), and started a medical tradition which would include Robert G.H. Kean's uncle, brother and one of his sons. Dr. Andrew Kean owned 17 enslaved persons in 1830.

Robert G. H. Kean's mother died when he was three years old, and he was raised at Mt. Airy by his maternal aunt, Miss Elizabeth Hill, until his father, John Vaughan Kean (1803-1876) remarried in 1837 and brought his son back to his own Caroline County plantation, "Olney". John V. Kean owned 9 enslaved persons in Caroline County in the 1830 census and 23 enslaved persons in Caroline County in the 1850 federal census. R. G. H. Kean also had an elder brother, Dr. Launcelot M. Kean (1826-1850), who died in Philadelphia, Pennsylvania but was interred with their mother at the Hill family cemetery at Mt. Airy, Ruther Glen, Virginia.

Robert G. H. Kean attended the Episcopal High School in Alexandria, Virginia under Dr. William N. Pendleton (who later became a Confederate artillery chief) and the Concord Academy in Caroline County under Frederick W. Coleman, a University of Virginia graduate. In 1848 R.G.H. Kean began his own studies at the University of Virginia, and graduated with degrees of Bachelor of Arts and Master of Arts before studying law.

In 1854, Robert G. H. Kean married Jane Nicholas Randolph (1831-1868), a daughter of Thomas Jefferson Randolph of "Edgehill" plantation in Albemarle County. They had several children, most of whom survived to adulthood, including three of their four sons: Launcelot Minor Kean (1856-1931), Pattie Cary Morris (1858-1939), Dr. Jefferson Randolph Kean (1860-1950) and George Randolph Kean (1866-1869). On January 14, 1874, Kean remarried, at the residence of Col. Nicholas Long near Weldon, North Carolina, to Adelaide Navarro de M. Prescott (1845-1922), daughter of formerly prominent planter William Marshall Prescott (1808-1854) of St. Landry Parish, Louisiana, and whose brother Capt. L.D. Prescott led one of the last Louisiana Confederate companies to surrender. They had four children.

== Career ==
Upon admission to the Virginia bar in 1853, Kean began his law practice in Lynchburg, Virginia with J. O. L. Goggin. Lynchburg was a key slave trading city on the James River, and an early railroad hub as well. By the 1860 U.S. Federal census, R.G.H. Kean personally owned several enslaved people, and rented another.

When the Civil War began, Kean enlisted as a private with the 11th Virginia Infantry on April 28, 1861. The following February, he was commissioned a captain, and placed on the staff of his wife's uncle, George Wythe Randolph. When Randolph transferred to the War Department in Richmond, Kean followed him and received a civilian appointment as chief of the Bureau of War. His immediate supervisor was John Archibald Campbell, who had resigned from the U.S. Supreme Court.

After the Battle of Gettysburg, on July 7, 1863, Kean wrote that Lee had captured 40,000 of the enemy, but remained skeptical because of the lack of official news. The following day, he received those reports, and wrote "The week just ended has been one of unexampled disaster since the war began. Vicksburg had surrendered and Gettysburg was 'a virtual if not an actual defeat.'" Kean also ran to become a delegate in the Confederate House of Representatives.

During the Confederate evacuation of Richmond in April 1865, Kean took the War Department's papers to South Carolina. Following General Lee's surrender at Appomattox Court House, Kean traveled back to Lynchburg through Virginia's back country. He noticed devastation, which he attributed to the abolition of slavery, characterizing manumission as "the greatest social crime ever committed on Earth." Particularly after the death of General Robert E. Lee, Kean became active in the Lost Cause, as most prominently espoused by former Gen. Jubal Early, who also maintained a residence in Lynchburg and published the Southern Historical Society Papers, to which Kean contributed in 1876 (one paper using the military or honorific title "Colonel).

Kean became a charter member and served as the second president of The Virginia Bar Association. He also remained an active alumnus of the University of Virginia, serving eight years as a member of its board of visitors, and the board's rector for four years. Kean also served on the vestry of St. Paul's Church, and on the Standing Committee of the Episcopal Diocese of Southern Virginia after its creation.

== Death and legacy ==
Kean died on June 13, 1898. At the time of his death, only former Confederate Postmaster-General Reagan of Texas was living and held a higher civil office in the Confederacy bureaucracy.

The Kean collection at the University of Virginia includes many of the older Kean's papers, including volumes of correspondence with his son Jefferson Randolph Kean, who became a distinguished surgeon and Brigadier General in the U.S. Army. Both Jane Kean and Jefferson Kean were buried in the cemetery at Monticello. University of Virginia history professor Edward E. Younger published an edited version of Kean's diary, which was reissued in a paperback version in 1993, and also available on google books.
