= William J. Robertson =

American judge

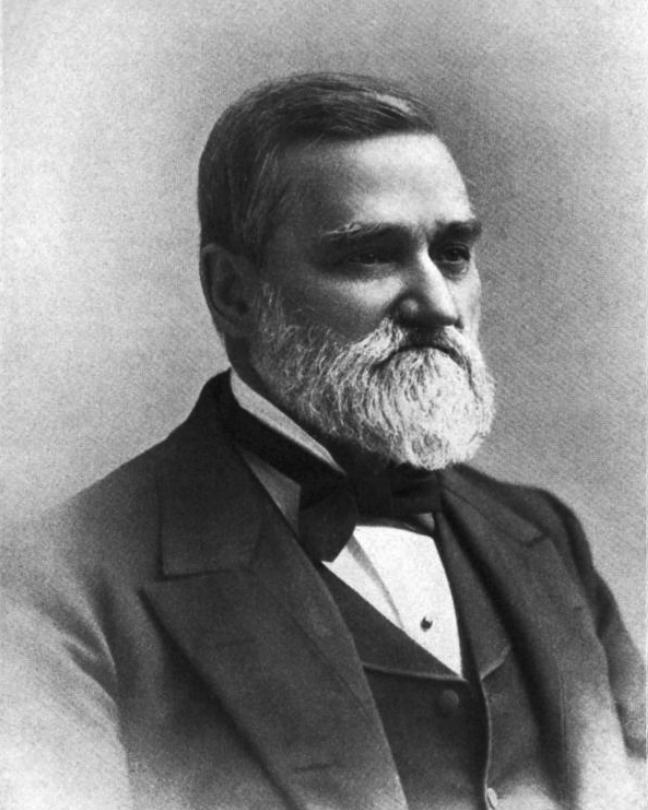

1st President of the Virginia Bar Association
- In office July 6, 1888 – July 25, 1889
- Preceded by: None (office created)
- Succeeded by: Robert Garlick Hill Kean

Personal details
- Born: William Joseph Robertson; December 20, 1817; Culpeper, Virginia, U.S.
- Died: May 27, 1898 (aged 80); Charlottesville, Virginia, U.S.
- Spouses: Hannah Gordon (m. 1842) Alice Watts (m. 1863)
- Education: University of Virginia

William Joseph Robertson (December 20, 1817 – May 27, 1898) was born in Culpeper County, Virginia in 1817. He attended the University of Virginia from 1834 to 1836 and again in 1841. After graduating, he was admitted to the bar in 1843, settled in Charlottesville to practice law, and won election as Commonwealth's Attorney for Albemarle County, Virginia in 1852. His Charlottesville home, the Judge William J. Robertson House, was listed on the National Register of Historic Places in 1999.

Robertson prosecuted the trial of John S. Mosby, who was accused of shooting another student. Mosby claimed self-defense, but was convicted and sent to jail. Afterward, Robertson became a friend and mentor to Mosby, who kept a portrait of Robertson on the wall of his home.

In 1859, Robertson was elected to the Court of Appeals on which he served until 1865, when Virginia's post-war governor declined to reappoint him to the reorganized court.

In 1860, on the death of Peter V. Daniel, some Virginians lobbied for President James Buchanan to select Robertson for the United States Supreme Court.

Returning to private practice, he was attorney in many important cases involving the interests of Virginia and her citizens following the war. Most famous among these was his representation of the Lee family in the Arlington estate case. He also was known as an accomplished railroad lawyer, serving as general counsel for the Norfolk & Western and as a board member of the Chesapeake & Ohio railroads.

Judge Robertson was a charter member and the first president of the Virginia Bar Association, whose first annual meeting was held at White Sulphur Springs, West Virginia on August 24 and 25, 1889. In his presidential address, Robertson recommended the merger of law and equity in Virginia civil procedure,. His ideas "fell like a thunderbolt on some of his hearers," reported the editor of the Virginia Law Journal, who concluded, "I doubt they will recover their serenity in a year." The merger of law and equity in Virginia was accomplished, only partially, more than 100 years after his death.
