= William J. Leake =

American judge

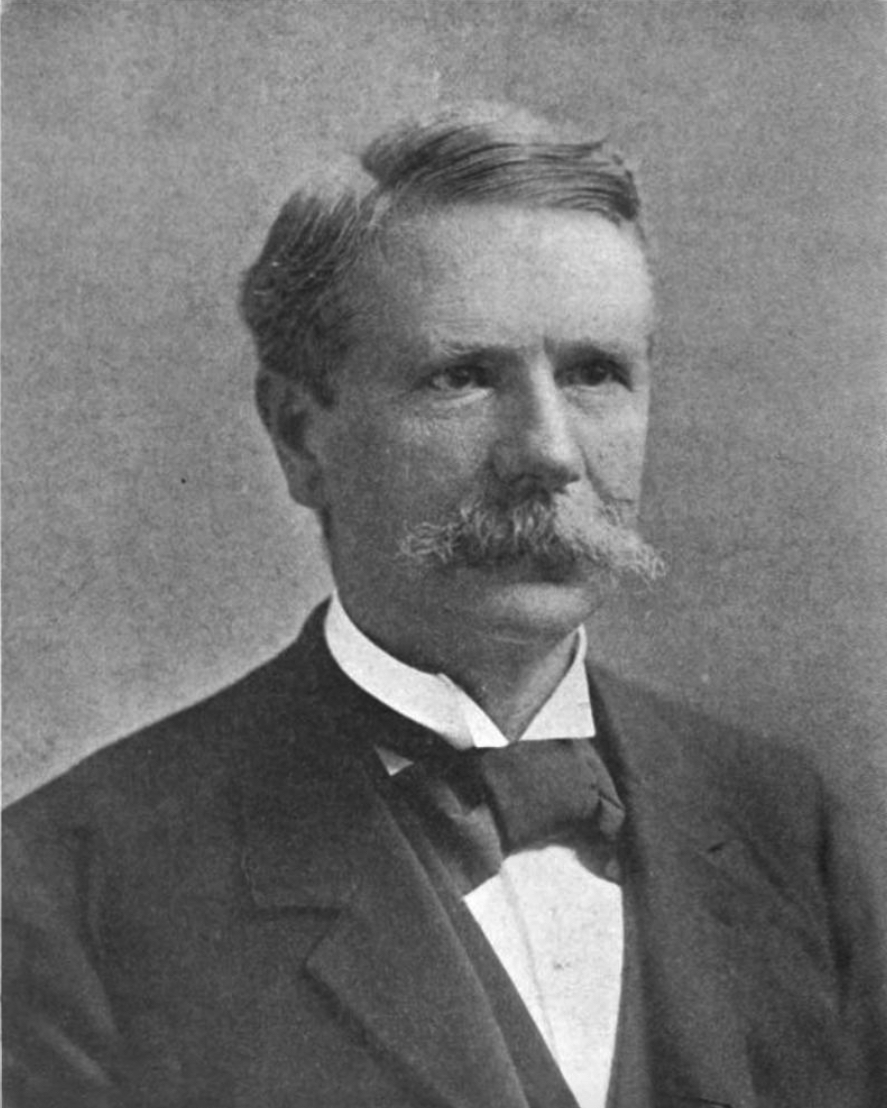

12th President of the Virginia Bar Association
- In office August 3, 1899 – July 19, 1900
- Preceded by: John Goode
- Succeeded by: William A. Anderson

Personal details
- Born: William Josiah Leake; September 20, 1843 Goochland, Virginia, U.S.
- Died: November 23, 1908 (aged 65) Richmond, Virginia, U.S.
- Spouse(s): Sarah Jordan; Clara Grundy

Military service
- Allegiance: Confederate States
- Branch/service: Confederate States Army
- Battles/wars: American Civil War

William Josiah Leake (September 20, 1843 - November 23, 1908) was a Virginia lawyer and judge, who served as a railroad president and president of The Virginia Bar Association.

== Biography ==
Leake was born in Goochland County, Virginia, and was a great-grandson of William O. Callis. He served four years in the Confederate Army. After the war, he was selected for a term as judge of the Virginia chancery court at Richmond, but declined to be re-elected.

In 1891, Judge Leake decided the case of Bettie Thomas Lewis, concluding that she was entitled to her deceased father's property. The father had owned the mother of Ms. Lewis as a slave. The New York Times reported that this ruling made Ms. Lewis "the richest colored person in Virginia." In a detailed opinion, the Virginia Supreme Court affirmed Judge Leake's decision.

Leake was from 1889 general counsel and from 1905 to 1906 president of the Richmond, Fredericksburg, and Potomac Railroad Company.

Leake was a charter member of the Virginia State Bar Association, beginning in 1890, and served as president of the Association for 1899–1900.

Judge Leake died at his home in Richmond.
