= Pantops Academy =

Pantops Academy is a school in Charlottesville, Virginia. John Leighton Stuart started attending the school in 1892 when it had one of the highest reputations among all the Southern private schools. After graduation, Stuart eventually came back to the school, teaching Latin and Greek there for three years.

== Notable alumni ==
- James S. McCue (1861–1905), mayor of Charlottesville, murderer
