= List of mayors of Charlottesville, Virginia =

The Mayor of Charlottesville is the president of the City Council in Charlottesville, Virginia. Before 1888, Charlottesville was a town within Albemarle County, Virginia, and the electorate directly chose a mayor in regular elections. In 1888, Charlottesville incorporated as a city independent of the county but continued to select its mayors in the same fashion. Since 1922, however, the popular electorate has chosen a number of individuals to serve on city council - initially three, then five from 1928 to the present. From 1922 through 2006 those elections took place in May or June each even-numbered year. Beginning in 2007, council elections moved to November of odd-numbered years. The elected councilors chose one of their own members to serve as leader of the council with the title of "mayor" but with no distinct legal or executive authority. The mayor presides over council meetings and occasionally plays a role as the ceremonial head of city government.

== List of mayors ==
=== Popularly elected mayors (1853–1922) ===
(partial list)

Mayor	Political party	Term start	Term end
Christopher L. Fowler			April 1868
T. W. Savage		April 1868	March 1870
N. H. Massie		March 1870	April 1870
Christopher L. Fowler		April 1870	1870
William L. Cochran		1870	1875?
Richard F. Harris		1875	1881
B. R. Pace		July 1, 1881	July 1, 1883
Richard F. Harris		July 1, 1883	1888
Samuel Baker Woods		1888	1892
L. T. Hanckel		1892	1894
John Shelton Patton	Democratic	1894	1896
J. Samuel McCue	Democratic	1896	August 31, 1900
Charles W. Allen		September 1, 1900	August 31, 1902
J. Samuel McCue	Democratic	September 1, 1902	August 31, 1904
George W. Olivier		September 1, 1904	August 31, 1908
Elbridge G. Haden		September 1, 1908	August 31, 1912
Alpheus V. Conway		September 1, 1912	August 31, 1916
Elbridge G. Haden		September 1, 1916	August 31, 1920
Benjamin E. Wheeler		September 1, 1920	August 31, 1922

=== City Council chosen mayors (1922–present) ===
Image	Mayor	Political party	Tenure start	Tenure end	Terms	Notes
	John R. Morris	Democratic	September 1, 1922	August 31, 1924	1	
	Jury Y. Brown	Democratic	September 1, 1924	August 31, 1930	3	
	Frederick L. Watson	Democratic	September 1, 1930	August 31, 1932	1	
	Frederick W. Twyman	Democratic	September 1, 1932	August 31, 1934	1	
	W. Dandridge Haden	Democratic	September 1, 1934	August 31, 1938	2	
	George T. Huff	Democratic	September 1, 1938	August 31, 1940	1	
	W. Dandridge Haden	Democratic	September 1, 1940	August 31, 1942	1 (3 total)	
	J. Emmett Gleason	Democratic	September 1, 1942	August 31, 1944	1	
	Roscoe S. Adams	Democratic	September 1, 1944	August 31, 1948	1	
	Gus Tebell	Democratic	September 1, 1948	August 31, 1950	1	
	Strother F. Hamm	Democratic	September 1, 1950	August 31, 1952	1	
	William R. Hill	Democratic	September 1, 1952	August 31, 1954	1	
	Sol B. Weinberg	Democratic	September 1, 1954	August 31, 1956	1	
	Robert M. “Jack” Davis	Democratic	September 1, 1956	August 31, 1958	1	
	Thomas J. Michie	Democratic	September 1, 1958	August 31, 1960	1	
	Louie L. Scribner	Democratic	September 1, 1960	August 31, 1962	1	
	Bernard J. Haggerty	Democratic	September 1, 1962	August 31, 1964	1	
	Lindsey B. Mount	Democratic	September 1, 1964	August 31, 1966	1	
	Burkett A. Reynolds	Democratic	September 1, 1966	August 31, 1968	1	
	Gunther "Dutch" Vogt	Republican	September 1, 1968	August 31, 1970	1	
	Mitchell Van Yahres	Democratic	September 1, 1970	July 3, 1972	1	
	Francis H. Fife	Democratic	July 3, 1972	July 1, 1974	1	
	Charles H. Barbour	Democratic	July 1, 1974	July 1, 1976	1	First African-American mayor
	Nancy K. O'Brien	Democratic	July 1, 1976	July 1, 1978	1	
	Laurence A. Brunton	Republican	July 1, 1978	July 1, 1980	1	
	Francis L. Buck	Democratic	July 1, 1980	July 1, 1988	4	
	Elizabeth "Bitsy" Waters	Democratic	July 1, 1988	July 2, 1990	1	
	Alvin Edwards	Democratic	July 2, 1990	July 1, 1992	1	
	Tom Vandever	Democratic	July 1, 1992	July 4, 1994	1	
	David Toscano	Democratic	July 4, 1994	July 1, 1996	1	
	Kay Slaughter	Democratic	July 1, 1996	July 1, 1998	1	
	Virginia Daugherty	Democratic	July 1, 1998	July 3, 2000	1	
	Blake Caravati	Democratic	July 3, 2000	July 1, 2002	1	
	Maurice Cox	Democratic	July 1, 2002	July 1, 2004	1	
	David Brown	Democratic	July 1, 2004	January 7, 2008	2	
	Dave Norris	Democratic	January 7, 2008	January 3, 2012	2	
	Satyendra Huja	Democratic	January 3, 2012	January 4, 2016	2	
	Michael Signer	Democratic	January 4, 2016	January 2, 2018	1	
	Nikuyah Walker	Independent	January 2, 2018	January 5, 2022	2	
	J. Lloyd Snook, III	Democratic	January 5, 2022	January 2, 2024	1	
	Juandiego Wade	Democratic	January 2, 2024	Incumbent	1	
