= Samuel C. Graham =

American lawyer

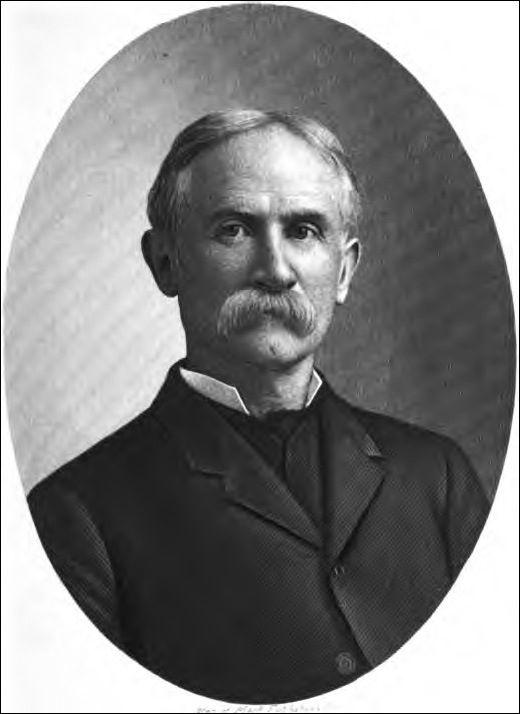
Samuel C. Graham

Samuel Cecil Graham (January 1, 1846 – January 11, 1923) was a Virginia lawyer and judge, who served as president of the Virginia Bar Association.

Graham became a soldier in the Confederate Army at age 17. He was wounded in action three times during the War. He attended Emory and Henry College for two years, beginning in 1867, then read law at Jeffersonville, which was then the county seat of Tazewell County, Virginia. He was admitted to the bar in 1870, and elected county judge in 1873, serving until 1880. He practiced for the rest of his career in Tazewell County.

Graham was the charter president of the Clinch Valley bank at its founding in 1889. In 2005, the successors of the bank chartered in 1889 were owned by National Bankshares, Inc.

Graham was president of the Virginia State Bar Association for 1902-1903.

Graham spent a month each winter in Florida. His old home on the Intracoastal Waterway is now a bed and breakfast, called Indian River House.
