= Charles H. Barbour =

American politician from Virginia

Mayor of Charlottesville, Virginia
- In office July 1, 1974 – July 1, 1976
- Preceded by: Francis H. Fife
- Succeeded by: Nancy K. O'Brien

Member of the Charlottesville City Council
- In office 1970–1978

Personal details
- Party: Democratic
- Profession: Politician

Charles H. Barbour is a politician from Charlottesville, Virginia. He served as the first Black mayor of Charlottesville from 1974 to 1976. Barbour was also the first African-American to be elected to the Charlottesville City Council (1970–1978), and was the first Black member of the Charlottesville Jaycees (Junior Chamber of Commerce). He relinquished his membership at the age of 35.
