= Lynching of John Henry James =

African American who was lynched in the U.S.

John Henry James was an African-American man who was lynched near Charlottesville, Virginia on July 12, 1898, for having allegedly raped a white woman. James had no known family in the area, and had lived in Charlottesville for only five or six years. He was an ice cream seller; "nothing else is known of him."

== Accusation ==
Julia Hotopp, 20, from a prominent white family, reported that on the morning of July 11, 1898, she been assaulted by a "very black man, heavy-set, slight mustache, [who] wore dark clothes, and his toes were sticking out of his shoes." The Commonwealth Attorney (prosecutor), Captain Micajah Woods, said after talking with her that "it was one of the most atrocious rapes ever committed. The circumstances were of such a character and so revolting that he was unwilling to state them in detail — of a character to stir any community to its deepest depths."

James was quickly arrested and then identified by Hotopp; there is no recorded statement on whether James matched the description she had given, or whether his body showed the scrapes that must have resulted since Julia clawed her attacker so hard there were particles of his skin under her fingernails. He was taken to the scene of the crime and his shoes matched tracks at the scene. As he was returned to jail in Charlottesville a large crowd grew and there was talk of lynching. For his protection James was smuggled out of the jail ("taken over the north wall of the jailyard, through some private premises out by the wine-cellar"), and taken by train 40 miles west to the jail in Staunton, Virginia, where he spent the night. The crowd in Charlottesville was described as "outraged". "It became necessary to take some of them through the jail to satisfy them that the man had really been taken away."

A grand jury was convened for the following morning.

== Lynching ==
As James was being returned to Charlottesville by train for his hearing, a crowd estimated at 150 was waiting at the Wood's Crossing station, 4 miles (6.4 km) west of Charlottesville, at the present site of the Farmington Country Club. When the train stopped, unmasked men overpowered the police chief and sheriff who were escorting him and took James from the train. Despite James's protestations of innocence (some reports say he admitted his guilt), they hanged him from a tree near the station. Once he was hanging members of the mob shot him; Hotopp's brother "emptied his pistol into the body". He received an estimated 40 bullets. People took pieces of his clothing as souvenirs.

The fact that the train stopped at the Wood's Crossing station, where a crowd was awaiting it, was commented on in the press. One said that the escorts should have taken him on the fast train, which did not stop there; another said that they did take the fast train, but "it was flagged down by some one." Another says that a man dressed in woman's clothing stood on the tracks, forcing a stop. "Several Staunton gentlemen who felt there would be a lynching got on the train and went along to see it."

At the time of the lynching, the grand jury was meeting, and had decided to indict him ("bring a true bill"), but the documents had not yet been prepared. The court adjourned when informed of the lynching but later reconvened and indicted the dead man for rape. The following morning, as a coroner's jury, they found that he "came to his death by the hands of persons unknown to the jury."

Although the lynchers did not conceal their identity, no one was ever charged with the killing. The only attacker whose name was recorded was Julia's brother, Carl. Carl Hotopp died at the age of 33 on May 25, 1901, under highly unusual circumstances. Hotopp was found dead near a railroad track, his corpse looted. However, one of his coat pockets, which had been missed contained $40 in cash, a life insurance policy for $5,000, and an accident policy for $5,000, and a ticket from his home to Staunton. It was determined that Hotopp had fallen from a moving train. The belief was that Hotopp had briefly gotten off the train, but when he got on again, the car door was closed. Hotopp then tried to hold on as long as he could, suffering serious scratches in the process, then fatal injuries after falling off the train.

== 2018 commemoration ==
On July 7, 2018, nearly 120 years after the lynching, about 50 people met at the lynching site and held a memorial service for James, since there is no indication that he had one at the time of his murder (his burial site is unknown). Nikuyah Walker, Charlottesville Mayor, and Ann Mallek, a member of the Albemarle County Board of Supervisors, members of the clergy, descendants of persons enslaved nearby, and racial justice activists were present, along with Susan Bro, mother of Heather Heyer, a counter-protester who was killed at the August 12, 2017, Unite the Right rally. Three containers were filled with soil: one for the City of Charlottesville, one for Albemarle County, and the third for the collection of soil from lynching sites deposited at the Equal Justice Initiative's National Memorial for Peace and Justice in Montgomery, Alabama. The Albemarle County soil will be part of a traveling exhibit on James, which will visit every library in the county, before being installed "semi-permanently" in the County Office Building. The story of James is told on a new Albemarle County Web page, devoted to its participation in the Equal Justice Initiative's Community Remembrance Project.

The next day, July 8, 2018, about 100 people from the Charlottesville area set off by bus with the soil on a week-long journey to Montgomery, Alabama, on a "pilgrimage through the civil rights landmarks of the South". The group was "expected to return with a six-foot tall steel monument commemorating James' lynching". The University of Virginia allowed 10 employees to make this trip without having to use vacation time; Albemarle County allowed 2. On July 12, 2018, the 120th anniversary of James' murder, the Charlottesville delegation arrived at the National Memorial for Peace and Justice in Montgomery, Alabama, where they delivered the soil from James' Albemarle County, Virginia, lynching site.

According to Washington Post reporter Joe Heim:

In this city, still bearing the wounds of the deadly display of modern white supremacy that visited last August [2017], remembering this earlier act of racial violence, organizers said, reminds the nation that the history of hatred is deep in its bones and seeped in its soil. Ignoring it has not made it go away, they say. Only by exhuming it and addressing it can America address its perpetual crisis with race.
