= Judge William J. Robertson House =

Historic house in Virginia, United States

- U.S. National Register of Historic Places
- Virginia Landmarks Register
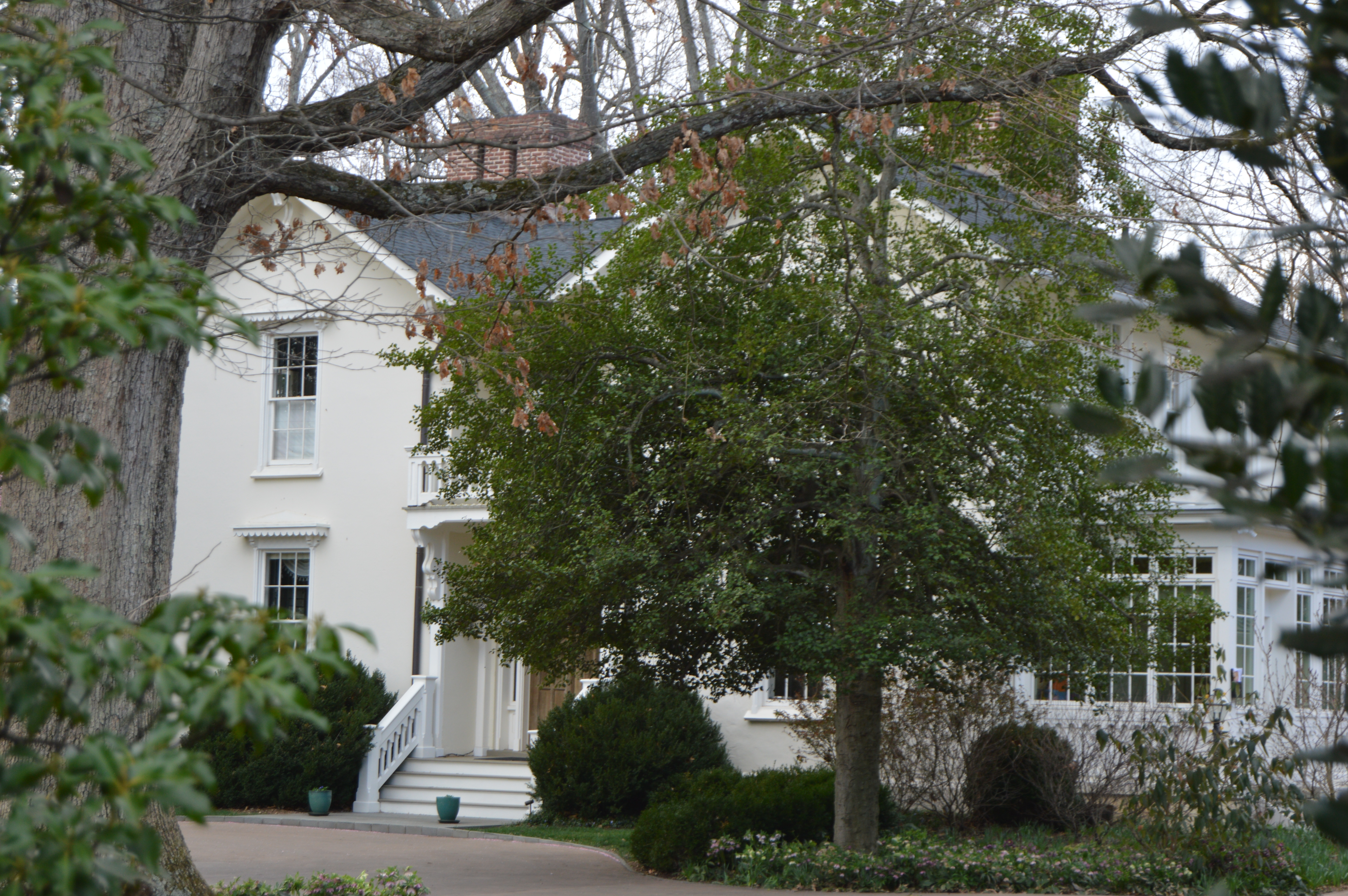
- Southern front of the house

- Location within Virginia Location within the United States
- Location: 705 Park St., Charlottesville, Virginia
- Coordinates: 38°2′13″N 78°28′34″W
- Area: 1.2 acres (0.49 ha)
- Built: 1859
- Architectural style: Italianate, Gothic Revival
- NRHP reference No.: 99001601
- VLR No.: 104-5074

Significant dates
- Added to NRHP: December 22, 1999
- Designated VLR: September 15, 1999

Judge William J. Robertson House is a historic home located at Charlottesville, Virginia. It was built in 1859, and is a two-story, roughly rectangular, brick dwelling with elements of the Italianate and Gothic Revival styles. It has rendered walls scored to simulate ashlar masonry, a hip-and-gable roof with broadly overhanging gable eaves supported by large decoratively carved brackets, and one-story wings and porches. It was built by Justice William J. Robertson (1817-1898), who was the "acknowledged leader of the Virginia bar" during the second half of the 19th century.

It was listed on the National Register of Historic Places in 1999.
