= Mary Berkeley Minor Blackford =

American anti-slavery activist

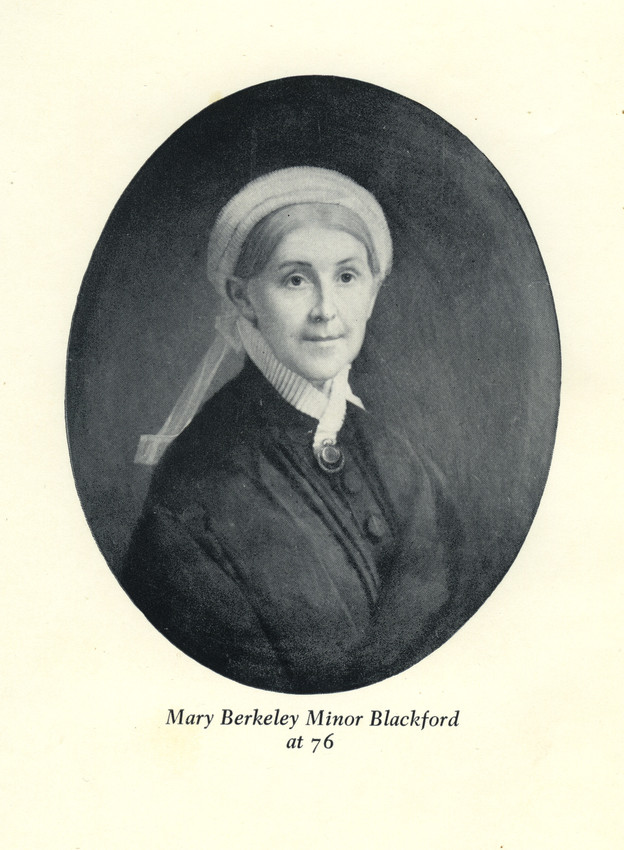
- Mary Berkeley Minor Blackford, from a portrait painted in the 1870s
- Born: December 2, 1802; Fredericksburg, Virginia
- Died: September 15, 1896 (aged 93); Alexandria, Virginia
- Father: John Minor
- Relatives: John B. Minor (cousin); John Minor Maury (cousin); Matthew Fontaine Maury (cousin)

Mary Berkeley Minor Blackford (December 2, 1802 – September 15, 1896) was an American anti-slavery activist, founder of the Female Auxiliary of the American Colonization Society in Fredericksburg.

== Early life ==
Mary Berkeley Minor was born in Fredericksburg, Virginia, the daughter of John Minor III and Lucy Landon Carter Minor. Her father was an American general in the War of 1812, and a close friend of James Monroe. Her extended family included her cousins John Barbee Minor, John Minor Maury, and Matthew Fontaine Maury.

== Activism ==
Blackford was active in the Episcopal church and the temperance movement, and in 1829 founded the Fredericksburg and Falmouth Female Auxiliary of the American Colonization Society. Colonization was a movement to resettle free black people from the United States to Liberia. The proponents of colonization had a range of anti-slavery, pragmatic, and racist motivations.

Blackford was herself opposed to slavery, and kept a journal, Notes Illustrative of the Wrongs of Slavery to record her personal experiences that shaped her beliefs on the topic. "From childhood I have bewailed the unnumbered ills of slavery," she wrote, while considering abolition itself impracticable. She taught slaves to read Bibles, against Virginia law, and was threatened with legal consequences. But her husband was not anti-slavery, and the Blackfords had slaves who worked in their household.

In 1834, she renamed the auxiliary as the Ladies' Society of Fredericksburg and Falmouth, for the Promotion of Female Education in Africa. Their emphasis moved to raising funds to support missionary teachers in Liberia. She raised funds, wrote pamphlets, and maintained an active correspondence with other anti-slavery activists, including her younger brother, a missionary in Liberia from 1837 until his death in 1843. Her direct work lessened when the Blackford family moved to Lynchburg in 1846, but she remained involved with the American Colonization Society and opposed secession before the American Civil War.

== Personal life ==
Mary Berkeley Minor married an attorney and newspaper editor, William Matthews Blackford (1801–1864) in 1825. They had eight children in fifteen years, and perhaps as a result, she experienced chronic severe back pain most of her adult life. Five of her sons served in the Confederate States Army during the American Civil War, which grieved her: “To see my sons arrayed against one part of their country,” she wrote in 1861, “is a sorrow that makes me feel the grave is the only place for me.” In 1892, her six living children gathered in Alexandria, Virginia, together for the first time since the war, to celebrate her ninetieth birthday with her.

She died in Alexandria in 1896, aged 93 years, survived by six of her children. The Blackford Family Papers, and a separate collection of her son Launcelot Minor Blackford's diaries, are held in the Southern Historical Collection at the University of North Carolina. Blackford's grandson, also named Launcelot Minor Blackford, wrote a biography of her, Mine Eyes Have Seen The Glory (Harvard University Press 1954). Her biographer's papers are archived at Emory University.
