= Nikuyah Walker =

Mayor of Charlottesville, Virginia

Mayor of Charlottesville, Virginia
- In office January 4, 2018 – January 5, 2022
- Preceded by: Michael Signer
- Succeeded by: Lloyd Snook

Personal details
- Party: Independent
- Children: 3
- Education: Virginia Commonwealth University (BA)
- Profession: Civil servant, activist

Nikuyah Walker is an American politician who was the mayor of Charlottesville, Virginia from 2018 to 2021. She became the city's first black female mayor in January 2018, after being elected to the Charlottesville City Council.

== Personal life ==
Walker was born and raised in Charlottesville. She graduated from Charlottesville High School in 1998 and received her bachelor's degree in political science from Virginia Commonwealth University in 2004. She has three children.

== Career ==
=== 2017 City Council Campaign ===
Walker began her campaign in March 2017. Her campaign gained traction after the Unite the Right rally in August 2017. Walker publicly pressured the City Council and then-mayor Michael Signer to answer questions about why a permit had been issued for the rally, and why the City Council was not addressing issues raised by the event. Walker and Heather Hill were elected to the city council, winning 29% and 28% of the vote respectively.

=== Mayor of Charlottesville ===
Walker was the first Independent candidate to be elected to the City Council since the 1940s. One of Walker's major goals was to increase affordable housing in the city.

Walker participated in The National Memorial for Peace and Justice to honor the memory of John Henry James, who was lynched just outside Charlottesville in 1898.

In March 2021, Walker began taking criticism of a Tweet published to both her Mayoral and personal Twitter and her Facebook pages stating "Charlottesville: The beautiful-ugly it is. It rapes you …"
