= Charles Minor Blackford =

American lawyer

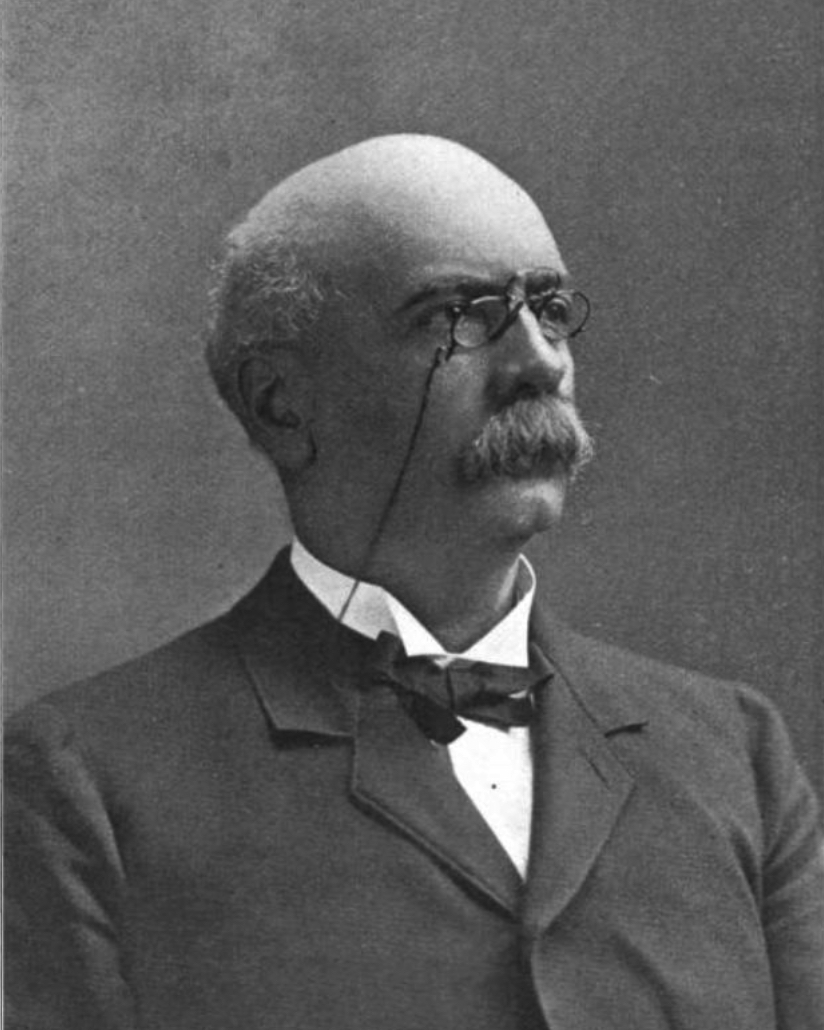

7th President of the Virginia Bar Association
- In office July 12, 1894 – August 8, 1895
- Preceded by: Waller Redd Staples
- Succeeded by: Robert M. Hughes

Personal details
- Born: Charles Minor Blackford; October 17, 1833 Fredericksburg, Virginia
- Died: March 11, 1903 (aged 69) Lynchburg, Virginia
- Spouse: Susan Leigh Colston

Military service
- Allegiance: Confederate States
- Branch/service: Confederate States Army
- Rank: Captain
- Battles/wars: American Civil War

Charles Minor Blackford (October 17, 1833 – March 10, 1903) was a Virginia lawyer and an author of American Civil War stories. His wartime correspondence with his wife, since published, remains a valuable resource for facts about life in the Confederate Army. Blackford's war experiences ranged from Manassas to Gettysburg to Appomattox.

== Biography ==
"Blackford enlisted in the 2nd Virginia Cavalry at the outset of the war and in 1863 was posted to Longstreet's Corps. Most of his service was in northern Virginia around the Rappahannock and the Rapidan Rivers, in the Shenandoah Valley, and with Lee's army at Gettysburg. In 1864 Blackford went west with Longstreet's army to Chattanooga, and he returned with Longstreet for the war's final days."

After the War, Blackford practiced law, and served as president of the People's National Bank of Lynchburg. Blackford was a charter member of The Virginia Bar Association, and served as its president for 1894–1895. Blackford was a director and counsel for the Virginia Midland Railroad, which became part of the Baltimore and Ohio Railroad. In 1881, Blackford wrote a legal history of the Virginia Midland Railroad.

In 1894, Blackford and his wife Susan Leigh Blackford of Lynchburg, Virginia privately published their Memoirs of Life in and Out of the Army in Virginia During the War Between the States. A seller of reprints of these volumes boasts that "Douglas Southall Freeman called Blackford's account of Appomattox one of the most important in existence."

Beginning in 1947, another, much-abridged version of Blackford's letters was sold publicly, under the name of Letters from Lee's Army, about which the reviewer in Time magazine wrote: "20th Century readers will be grateful for the sharp little anecdotes and graphic glimpses on almost every page." A new edition of this book became available in 1998.
