= William B. Pettit =

American politician

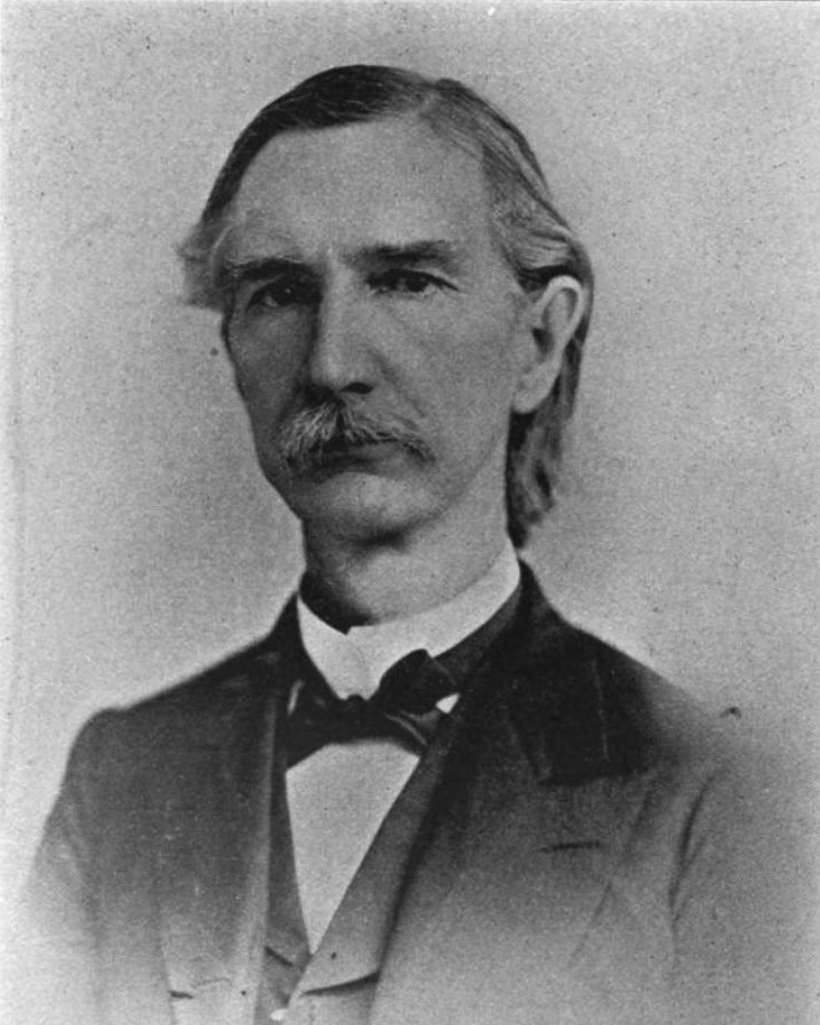

10th President of the Virginia Bar Association
- In office August 5, 1897 – July 7, 1898
- Preceded by: William Wirt Henry
- Succeeded by: John Goode

Personal details
- Born: William Beverly Pettit; October 10, 1825
- Died: January 11, 1905 (aged 79)
- Spouse: Arabella Speairs (m. 1851)

Military service
- Allegiance: Confederate States
- Branch/service: Confederate States Army
- Rank: Sergeant
- Battles/wars: American Civil War

William B. Pettit (October 10, 1825 – January 11, 1905) was a Virginia lawyer who served a term as president of The Virginia Bar Association, and was a delegate to the Virginia Constitutional Convention of 1901.

In 1851, Pettit married Arabella Speairs. During the Civil War, Pettit served in the Confederate Army, as an artillery sergeant in the unit from his home county. A collection of the wartime correspondence between Pettit and his wife has been published.

After the War, Pettit practice law in Fluvanna County. He also "had such a wide law practice at the court of Louisa that his portrait was hung in the courtroom." Pettit was elected Commonwealth's Attorney for Fluvanna County in 1874.

Pettit bought "Glen Burnie," now a historic landmark at Palmyra, Virginia, in 1878.

Pettit was the tenth president of the Virginia State Bar Association, for the term of 1897–1898. In 1901–02, Pettit was a delegate to the Virginia Constitutional Convention, including a stint as temporary chairman. "Each member of the convention received a pin oak seedling, and this oak still stands at Glen Burnie."

William and Arabella Pettit, and several of their children, are buried in the cemetery at Glen Burnie.
