= John Minor Maury =

US Navy officer (1795–1823)

- Born: 1795; Fredericksburg, Virginia, U.S.
- Died: June 23, 1823 (aged 27–28) near Norfolk, Virginia, U.S.
- Occupation: An officer the United States Navy between 1809-1823
- Known for: Being on the island of Nuku Hiva, in the South Pacific Ocean, when the American frigate USS Essex arrived there, on October 25, 1813
- Spouse: Eliza Maury (m. 1817)
- Relatives: John Minor (grandfather)

John Minor Maury (1795 – June 23, 1823) was an officer of the United States Navy. In 1888, fictionalized versions of his life story were published by his son, Dabney H. Maury, and his niece, Diana Fontaine Maury Corbin. These sensational stories became Maury's de facto biography for more than 130 years.

== Biography ==
John Minor Maury was born in 1795 (exact date unknown) near Fredericksburg, Virginia, to Richard Maury (son of Rev. James Maury) and Diana (Minor) Maury (daughter of General John Minor). He was appointed midshipman in the spring of 1809, on a warrant backdated to 16 January (a common practice in the navy at the time), and he was assigned to the USS United States.

In June 1811, Maury obtained a furlough and sailed on the merchant ship Pennsylvania Packet, commanded by US Navy lieutenant William Lewis, who was also on furlough. After trading for several weeks in Pernambuco and Rio de Janeiro, they sailed to Macau, arriving there on April 12, 1812. Once at Macau, they were informed of a recent sandalwood discovery by their agent, James Wilcocks, and at the end of May the Packet departed on what Lewis described as "a secret expedition."

The Packet arrived at Tahuata Island in the Marquesas Islands on September 25, 1812, and probably reached Nuku Hiva the next day. For four months they attempted to trade with the natives for sandalwood, but their success was limited because their trade goods were of little value to the island's chiefs. One thing that the chiefs did value, however, were whales' teeth.

In late 1811, the ship Hunter, Captain William Rogers, obtained two hundred tons of sandalwood from Nuku Hiva's Typee tribe in exchange for iron hoop, iron wares, and ivory, except that the ivory had been carved into the form of whales' teeth. The faux teeth were intended originally for trade in the Fiji Islands, but tribal warfare and general unrest in the Fiji Islands, aggravated largely by the sandalwood traders, prevented the teeth from being traded there. When the Hunter arrived at Nuku Hiva (on their second call there), Rogers discovered that elephant ivory was unknown to the Marquesans, and the fakes were apparently of such quality that the chiefs were duped into believing them to be genuine. That was the story that Rogers passed along to James Wilcocks, who passed the story to Lewis and Maury. When the Packet departed Macau, ivory was included in the cargo.

The forgeries passed off by Rogers were discovered eventually, and when Lewis and Maury arrived on Nuku, Hiva they discovered that the ivory they brought had no more value than their other trade items. Even so, the Packet departed Nuku Hiva with 100 tons of sandalwood on or about February 4, 1813, leaving behind Maury to continue trading for sandalwood. With Maury were crew mates Phineas Fairbanks and William Brudenell, a beachcomber named James Wilson, and the schooner Lydia, commanded by Nathaniel Lecatt and crewed by a mixture of European, Euro-American, and Chinese men.

Lewis learned of the War of 1812 when he arrived in China in March 1813. He promptly resigned as captain of the Packet and made plans to depart for the United States, but business affairs and his health kept him in Macau long enough to become stranded when the English blockaded the harbor beginning May 18, 1813. Lewis was unable to return to the US until after the war.

Maury knew nothing about the war against England until October 25, 1813, when the USS Essex appeared outside Taiohae Bay. During Lewis' absence, Maury continued to trade with the islanders for sandalwood and did his best to manage the men he commanded. He had considerable difficulty with Lecatt, who refused to accept Maury's authority for several weeks until crew desertions aboard the Lydia compelled the schooner's captain to seek Maury's assistance in getting them back. Lecatt was also responsible indirectly for the death of Phineas Fairbanks: Lecatt put Fairbanks ashore amongst the Typee, where he became the first known instance of a white man killed by natives in the Marquesas Islands.

Upon the arrival of the Essex Maury learned of the War of 1812 and immediately signed on with David Porter. He assisted in the building of a fort at Taiohae before he was assigned as first officer of the Essex Junior, which became a cartel after the Essex was defeated by HMS Phoebe. The Essex Junior returned to the United States in July, 1814.

Upon his return, Maury made his way to upstate New York in time to participate with the Battle of Lake Champlain as a subordinate of Commander Thomas Macdonough. He subsequently wrote to a friend in Fredericksburg, "We have gained a glorious victory. I hope the most important result of it will be to confirm the wavering allegiance of New York and Vermont to the Union. They have been threatening to secede unless peace be made with England on any terms!"

After the war, Maury traveled over the Appalacian Mountains to visit his family, who relocated near Franklin, Ohio at about the same time as Maury entered the navy. It was during this visit, around late 1814 or early 1815, that he told his siblings, including his youngest brother, Matthew Fontaine Maury, the stories of his island adventure.

Maury's next service was on the USS Guerriere in the Mediterranean Sea. He returned to Fredericksburg after that and married his first cousin, Eliza Maury, on April 3, 1817. He then sailed with the USS Macedonian as first lieutenant on a tour of duty along the South American coast. When that tour concluded, he transferred to the Mediterranean squadron, and again, David Porter was his commander. During that tour, he served for a time as flag captain of the Mediterranean fleet and was acting captain of the supply ship Decoy when he contracted yellow fever, and died just off Norfolk, Virginia, on June 23, 1823.

== 1888, 1964, and 2021 accounts ==
On April 19, 1888, an article appeared in the Moulton, Alabama newspaper, The Moulton Advertiser. During that same year, a biography of Matthew Fontaine Maury was published by Matthew's daughter, Diana Fontaine Maury Corbin. Both publications offered identical (albeit fictional) details of John Maury's life and adventures, stating that six men were with Maury and five of them were slaughtered by the natives and that Maury and "Baker" never saw a sail for two years and were forced to build a house in the tops of four cocoanut trees for survival.

In 1964, a scholarly biography of Matthew Maury was published by Francis Lewis. She amended John's shore party from six to four, with three killed, and shortened his stay to 18 months or more, during which "John lost hope of ever being rescued." Unfortunately, several of Lewis' references and footnotes turned out to be faulty, including the source of her new information, John's son Dabney.

In 2020, letters that John Maury wrote while on Nuku Hiva in 1813 were discovered alongside the correspondence of William Lewis, within the Conway Whittle Collection, at the College of William & Mary. These letters had somehow missed prior scholarly attention and provided details that rewrote the historical understanding of Maury's presence on Nuku Hiva.

Maury was indeed stranded but only for a few weeks, from the time the Lydia left (maybe late September) until the Essex appeared in late October. Also, he was not abandoned by Lewis either: the ship Albatross was sent from Canton weeks before the British blockaded Macau, and it arrived at Taiohae three weeks after the Essex.

== Footnotes ==
journalists.
