= Jefferson Randolph Kean =

United States Army general

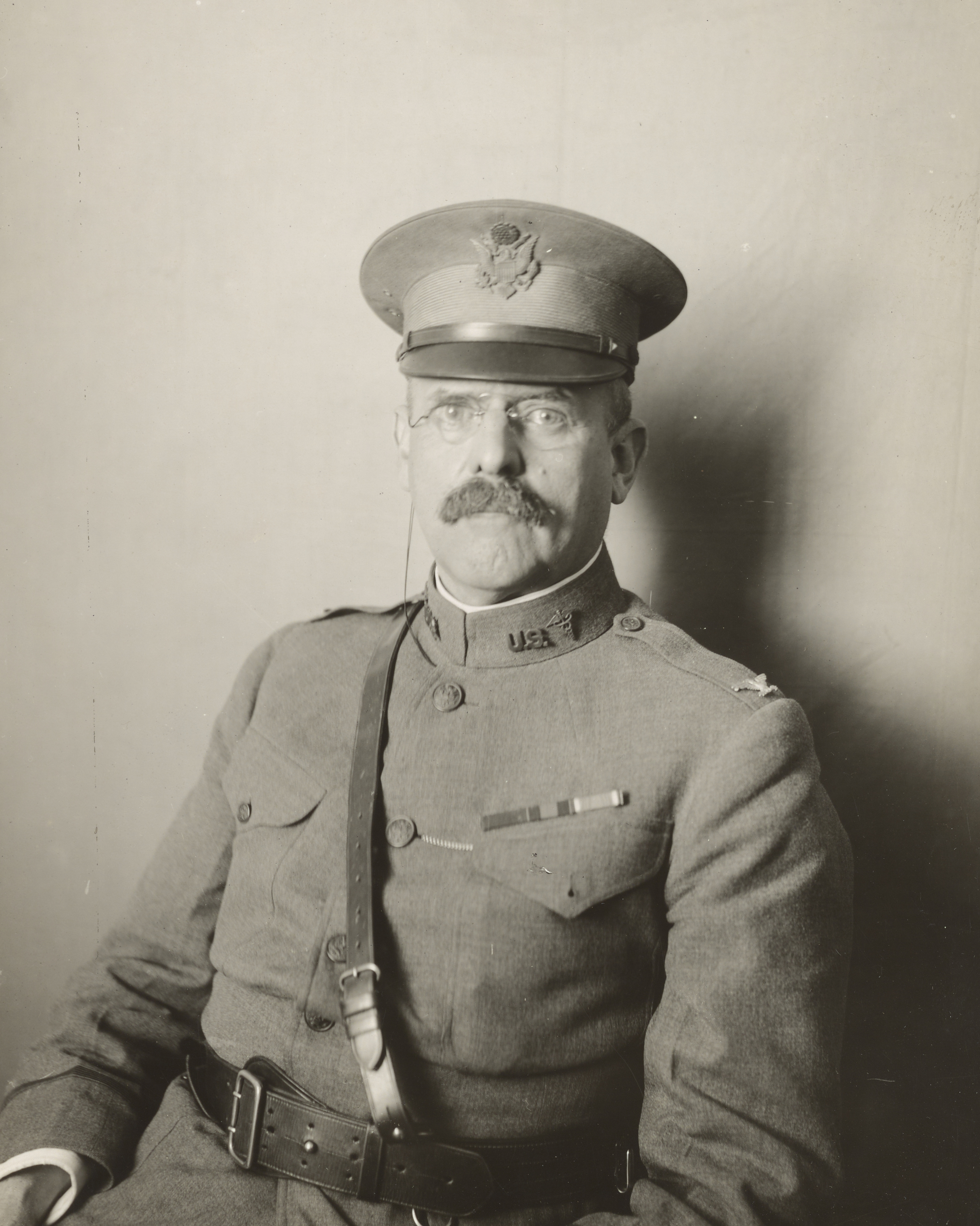
- Born: June 27, 1860; Lynchburg, Virginia, U.S.
- Died: September 4, 1950 (aged 90); Washington, D.C., U.S.
- Burial place: Monticello, Virginia, U.S.
- Military career
- Allegiance: United States of America
- Branch: United States Army
- Service years: 1884–1924
- Rank: Brigadier General
- Service number: 0-115
- Wars: Sioux Wars; Spanish–American War; World War I
- Awards: Distinguished Service Medal

Jefferson Randolph Kean, M.D. (June 27, 1860 – September 4, 1950) was an American military surgeon who served with the U.S. Army.

== Early years ==
Jefferson R. Kean was born in 1860 in Lynchburg, Virginia, to Robert Garlick Hill Kean and Jane Nicholas Randolph Kean. He was the great-grandson of Thomas Jefferson. Kean obtained his M.D. from the University of Virginia in 1883, where he was a member of the Phi Beta Kappa honor society.

== Military career ==
Kean was commissioned into the U.S. Army in 1884 as an assistant surgeon. During the first eight years of his career, Kean was stationed on the Western frontier attached to the Ninth Cavalry, eventually taking part in Ghost Dance War against the Sioux. In 1892, Kean was stationed in Florida and would remain there for the next five years.

=== Spanish–American War ===
With the outbreak of the Spanish–American War, Kean was attached to the 7th Army Corps and deployed to Cuba. He would remain in Cuba with the provisional military government until 1902. During this time, Kean served Department Chief Surgeon under General Fitzhugh Lee and later Superintendent of Department of Charities under General Leonard Wood.

=== Peacetime career ===
Upon his return from Cuba, Kean was made Assistant to the Surgeon General, position he would hold until 1906, when he was returned to Cuba as the adviser for the Department of Sanitation for the second provisional government until 1909. From 1909 to 1913, Kean was in charge of the Sanitary Division of the Surgeon General's office and developed a system for stockpiling emergency medical field supplies during his tenure. With the ample experience he gained through his roles ensuring the sanitation of public services in Cuba, Kean would later write the laws to organize the Sanitary Departments of Cuba and Puerto Rico.

He was president of the U.S. Association of Military Surgeons from 1914 to 1915.

=== First World War ===
Although the United States did not formally enter the World War I until April 1917 (see American entry into World War I), from 1916 organized the American Red Cross's Department of Military Relief and organized and equipped thirty-two base hospitals until the American entry into the war.

With the entry of the United States into World War I, Kean was deployed to France as the chief of the U.S. Ambulance Service with the French Army, for which he would receive the Distinguished Service Medal, until June 1918, when he was promoted to brigadier general and made Deputy Chief Surgeon of the American Expeditionary Force until the end of the war. Kean would return home having earned the Legion of Honor for his service in France.

The citation for his Army DSM reads:

The President of the United States of America, authorized by Act of Congress, July 9, 1918, takes pleasure in presenting the Army Distinguished Service Medal to Brigadier General Jefferson R. Kean, United States Army, for exceptionally meritorious and distinguished services to the Government of the United States, in a duty of great responsibility during World War I. As Chief of the Department of Military Relief, American Red Cross, a position of great responsibility, by his foresight, marked efficiency, and energy General Kean organized the bas hospitals, which cared for many of our wounded, and administered the United States Ambulance Service for duty with the French Army, greatly assisting our ally. He rendered services of conspicuous worth to the United States.

== Between the wars ==
Following his return from France, Kean held key positions in government commissions even after his retirement from the military in 1924. Kean was appointed member of the U.S. Commission for the construction of the National Expansion Memorial in by the President Franklin D. Roosevelt in 1934. As a direct descendant of Thomas Jefferson, he founded the Monticello Association in 1913 and was a member of the U.S. Commission to erect the Jefferson Memorial in Washington, D.C., in 1938.

He was awarded the Gorgas Medal by the Association of Military Surgeons in 1942.

== Personal life ==
Kean married Louise Hurlbut Young in 1894. Their marriage produced two children, Martha Jefferson and Robert Hill. Louise died in 1915. Kean remarried in 1919 to Cornelia Knox.

== Death ==
Kean died on September 4, 1950, aged 90, in Washington D.C. He is buried in Monticello, VA.
