= Michael Signer =

American lawyer and author

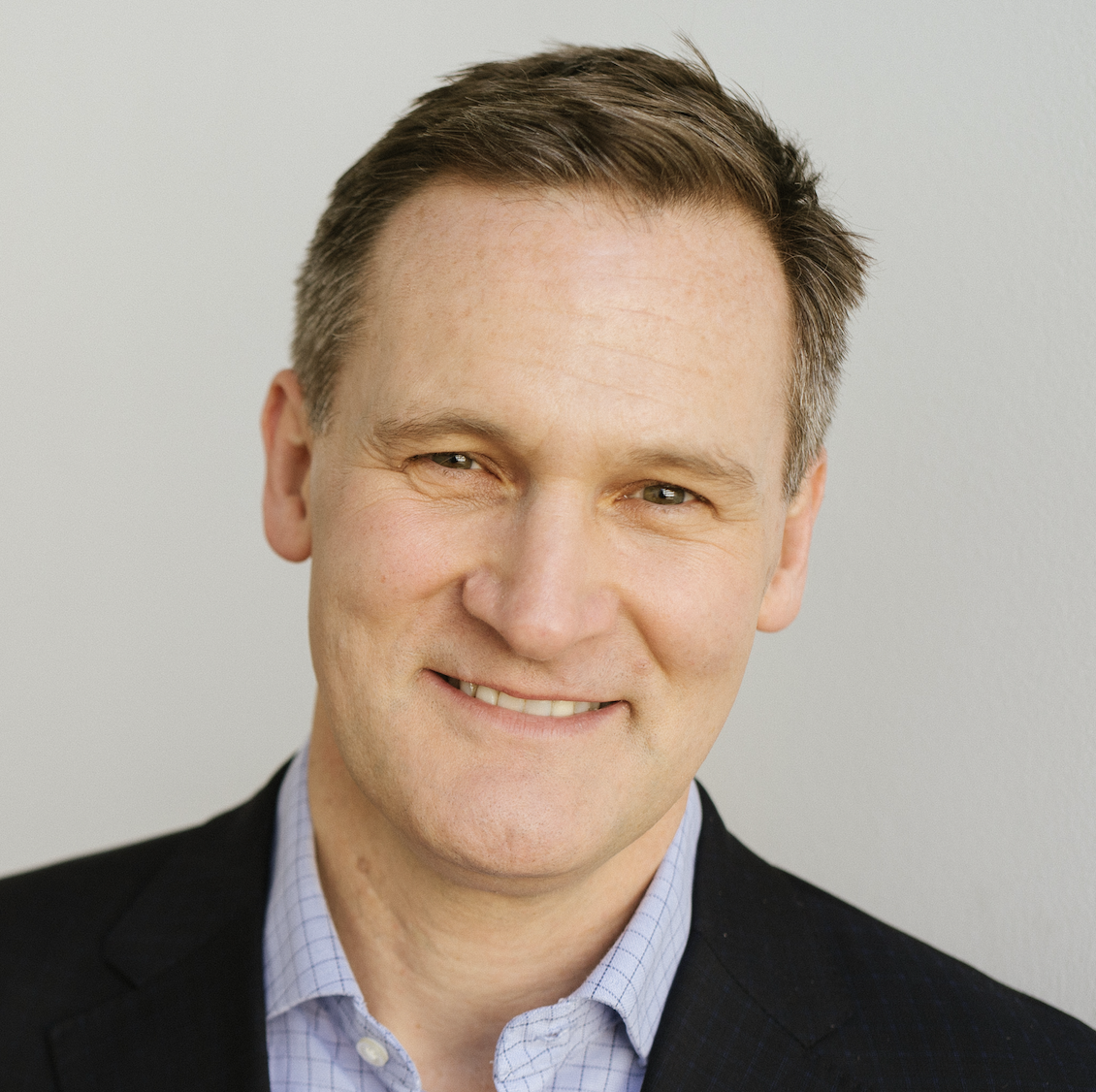
- Signer

Mayor of Charlottesville, Virginia
- In office January 4, 2016 – January 2, 2018
- Preceded by: Satyendra Huja
- Succeeded by: Nikuyah Walker

Personal details
- Party: Democratic
- Education: Princeton University (B.A.); University of California, Berkeley (Ph.D.); University of Virginia (J.D.)
- Profession: Author, attorney
- Website: michaelsigner.com

Michael Signer is an American attorney, author, and politician who served as mayor of Charlottesville, Virginia.

== Early life and education ==
Michael Signer was born to parents Marjorie B. Signer, a communications director, and Robert Signer, a newspaper assignment editor. He graduated from Washington-Lee High School in Arlington, Virginia, and magna cum laude from Princeton University, where he edited the Progressive Review.

He earned a Ph.D. in political science from the University of California, Berkeley, and a J.D. from the University of Virginia School of Law, where he was a Clerk at the Legal Aid Justice Center and Research Assistant to Professors A.E. Dick Howard and Michael Klarman. He was president of the Law Democrats, and co-founder of the UVA Chapter of the American Constitution Society. At UVA, he founded the UVA Coalition for Progress on Race, and went on to co-found the Center for the Study of Race and Law.

== Writing ==
Signer is the author of Cry Havoc: Charlottesville and American Democracy under Siege (PublicAffairs, 2020). The book is a first-person account of events before, during, and after the deadly "Unite the Right" rally in Charlottesville, Virginia in August 2017, as a microcosm of the challenges facing American democracy today. NPR's "All Things Considered" featured an interview with Signer about "Cry Havoc," where Signer said the "deepest theme of what Charlottesville is about" was "do we have the ability to have debate on the hardest issues or is one faction basically going to terrorize another into submission?" and that "the consequence of stepping out of the arena, of giving up — that's what allows societies, democracies to tilt toward authoritarianism."

Signer is the author of Becoming Madison: The Extraordinary Origins of the Least Likely Founding Father (PublicAffairs, 2015). The book is about leadership and statesmanship that is also an intellectual and psychological biography of young James Madison and his rivalry with his nemesis Patrick Henry in the ratification of the U.S. Constitution. Signer presented a public lecture on the book at the Library of Congress in 2016.

He is also the author of Demagogue: The Fight to Save Democracy from Its Worst Enemies (St. Martin's Press, 2009). The book chronicles democracy's historic struggle with the problem of demagogues, examines how political thinkers have grappled with the demagogue problem, and argues that constitutionalism, a robust culture of democratic norms and values embraced by ordinary citizens, is the best antidote to demagogues. He has written about the topic of demagoguery in connection with Donald Trump for The Washington Post, and The Atlantic. and been interviewed on the topic by NPR's Morning Edition and WNYC's On the Media.

He has published articles, essays, and book reviews in the New York Times, The Washington Post, Time Magazine, University of Richmond Law Review, The Washington Post, The New Republic, and the Daily Beast.

In 2006, he wrote an article advocating for a doctrine of "exemplarism" as a version of progressive American exceptionalism, titled "City on a Hill" in the inaugural issue of Democracy: A Journal of Ideas.

== Professional career ==
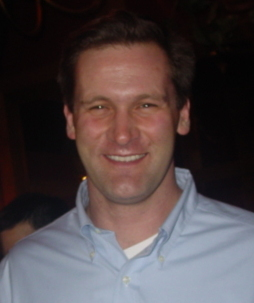
Signer in 2006

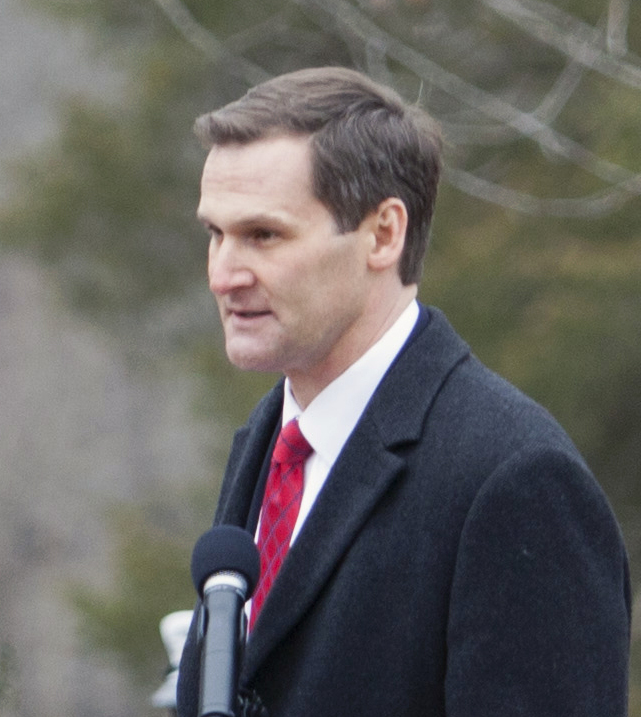
Signer in 2014

Signer has worked as a technology executive in both public and private companies, as a practicing attorney, and as a professor. In 2026 he was named Chief Policy and Legal Officer of EverDriven Technologies, the nation's largest provider of alternative transportation to children experiencing homelessness and those with disabilities. He previously was Partner and Chair of the Domestic Practice at Madison Law & Strategy Group, PLLC, a boutique law and consulting firm he founded in 2010. From 2022-2025, he served as North America Policy Director at Airbnb, the publicly-traded tourism and hospitality company, where he oversaw a team of 50 professionals. From 2017-2022, he was Partner, VP and General Counsel of WillowTree, Inc., a digital design firm with 1,000 employees. He served as counsel to then-Governor Mark Warner of Virginia. He previously served as co-chair of the Business Law Section of the Charlottesville-Albemarle Bar Association and chaired the Pro Bono Committee of the Young Lawyers Conference of the Virginia State Bar.

He has been a professor at the University of Virginia's Politics Department and Batten School of Leadership and Public Policy, Virginia Tech's School of Public and International Affairs, and Reichman University in Herzilya, Israel.

A voting rights attorney, he was statewide director for the 2004 election protection program directed by the Democratic National Committee. In 2010, he traveled to Panjshir Province, Afghanistan, as a member of a USAID-sponsored mission to monitor Afghanistan's parliamentary elections. He founded and co-chaired the New Electoral Reform Alliance for Virginia.

== Public service ==
In 2018, Signer founded Communities Overcoming Extremism, a project designed to increase capacity among both public and private sectors leaders for confronting extremism.

Signer has served as chair of the Emergency Food Network, president of the Fifeville Neighborhood Association, and a member of the steering committee of the West Main Street Redevelopment Project in Charlottesville. He is a former member of the Board of Directors of the Center for National Policy. He is a principal and former board member of the Truman National Security Project.

In the 2008 elections, Signer was foreign policy advisor to the John Edwards for President campaign. He was later senior strategist on the 2008 Congressional campaign of Tom Perriello. Signer was senior policy advisor at the Center for American Progress, and later that year worked with John Podesta on President-Elect Barack Obama's State Department Transition Team.

In 2009, Signer was a candidate for the Democratic nomination for Lieutenant Governor of Virginia, receiving 21% of the vote.

From 2009 to 2013, Signer was an appointee by Governor Tim Kaine to Virginia's Board of Medicine. He was a member of the finance committee for Terry McAuliffe for governor, and later served as chair of Governor-elect McAuliffe's Transition Council on Homeland Security. Earlier in his career, he was legislative aide to then-Delegate Creigh Deeds. Governor Terry McAuliffe appointed him to the Council on Virginia's Future.

== Mayor of Charlottesville ==
On January 4, 2016, Charlottesville City Council elected Signer as the city's new mayor, succeeding outgoing mayor Satyendra Huja. Signer took office the same evening.

As mayor, Signer's four main priorities were innovation, infrastructure, governance, and equity. He led the city to rehabilitate the historic African-American Daughters of Zion cemetery with a special allocation of $80,000 from Council's Strategic Fund.

He worked with the city council to create a Blue Ribbon Commission on Race, Memorials, and Public Spaces to address controversies over Confederate statues in Charlottesville. Charlottesville also hired the city's first African-American police chief during Signer's tenure.

In the wake of President Donald Trump's first announcement of the "Muslim Ban", Signer declared Charlottesville a "capital of the resistance" to Trump's administration. He held a rally bringing together leaders including Khizr Khan, as well as local faith and University leaders, to declare opposition to religious intolerance and to propose support for immigrants and refugees. Signer helped create Welcoming Greater Charlottesville, and Council later enacted Signer's proposal to allocate $10,000 to the Legal Aid Justice Center to represent immigrants and helped create Welcoming Greater Charlottesville.

Signer created a Mayor's Advisory Council on Innovation and Technology to link stakeholders in the Charlottesville technology sector. The Council enacted Signer's proposal to double Charlottesville's spending on affordable housing, expanded the technology tax credit from five to seven years, increased public school investment by $2 million, and enacted protections for historic neighborhoods.

During Signer's tenure, the city council also created an Open Data policy, and required agencies to register voters to vote online.

In the wake of the violent "Unite the Right" event of August 2017, the city, under Signer's tenure, collaborated with Georgetown University's Institute for Constitutional Advocacy and Protection to successfully sue over a dozen paramilitary groups under a provision of the Virginia Constitution to prevent them from entering the city again.

During Signer's tenure as mayor, Charlottesville was named by Entrepreneur as the #4 City in the U.S. for entrepreneurship.

== Awards and recognitions ==
Signer received the annual Levenson Family Defender of Democracy Award from the Anti-Defamation League in 2017. He is a member of the 2017 Class of Aspen Institute Rodel Fellows. He was recognized by Forward Magazine in its "Forward 50" 2017 list of the 50 most influential Jewish leaders in America. In 2018, he received the annual "Distinguished Alumnus" Award from the University of California Alumni Club of Washington, D.C. In 2019, he was given the Courage in Political Leadership Award by the American Society for Yad Vashem, the Rob DeBree and David O'Malley Award for Community Response to Hatred Award from the Matthew Shepard Foundation, and the Jerold L. Solovy Freedom Award from the Anti-Defamation League Midwest.

== Personal life ==
Signer lives in Northern Virginia with his wife and their twin sons.
