= James S. McCue =

American politician and murderer (1861–1905)

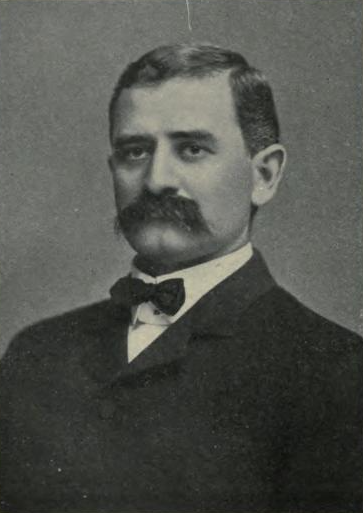
- McCue in a 1904 publication

Mayor of Charlottesville
- In office 1902 – September 1, 1904
- Preceded by: Charles W. Allen
- Succeeded by: George W. Olivier
- In office 1896–1900
- Preceded by: John Shelton Patton
- Succeeded by: Charles W. Allen

Personal details
- Born: James Samuel McCue; January 15, 1861 Albemarle County, Virginia, U.S.
- Died: February 10, 1905 (aged 44) Albemarle County Jail, Charlottesville, Virginia, U.S.
- Cause of death: Execution by hanging
- Party: Democratic
- Spouse: Fannie McNutt Crawford (m. 1886; died 1904)
- Children: 4
- Education: University of Virginia School of Law
- Occupation: Politician; lawyer

James Samuel McCue (January 15, 1861 – February 10, 1905) was an American politician and lawyer from Virginia. He served as mayor of Charlottesville from 1896 to 1900 and from 1902 to 1904. He was executed by hanging for murdering his wife.

== Early life ==
James Samuel McCue was born on January 15, 1861, in Albemarle County, Virginia, to Sallie Jane Moon and James Cyrus McCue. His father served in the Confederate Army. McCue was educated at private schools in Albemarle County and Pantops Academy in Charlottesville. He attended the University of Virginia School of Law.

== Career ==
In 1884, McCue moved to Charlottesville. McCue opened a law office in Charlottesville after graduating. He was alderman in the city of Charlottesville for seven or eight years.

McCue was a Democrat. He served as mayor of Charlottesville for three terms: two terms, from 1896 to 1900 and an additional term, from 1902 to September 1, 1904.

== Personal life ==
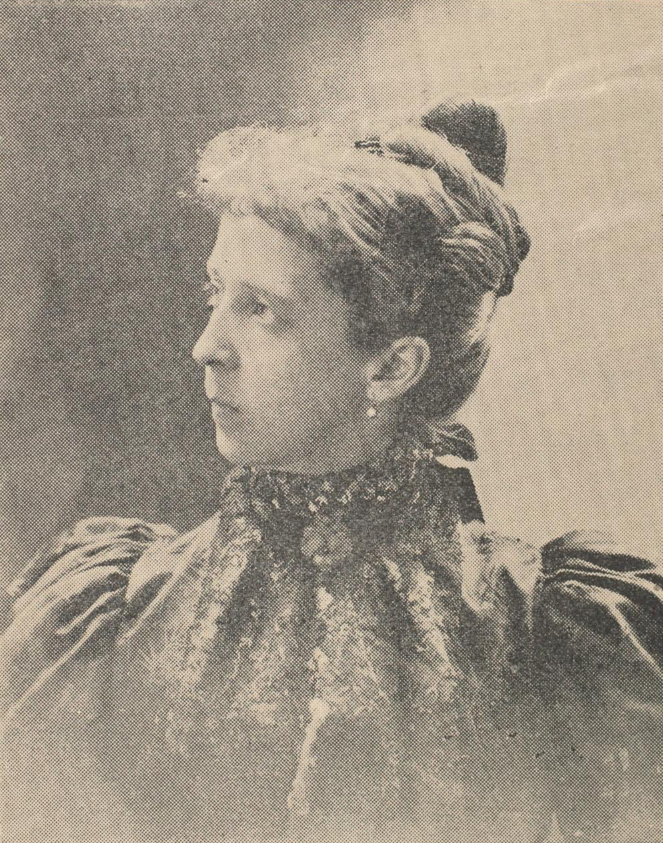
Mrs. Fannie Crawford McCue in a 1904 publication

McCue married Fannie McNutt Crawford on November 4, 1886. They had four children, James William, Samuel Overton, Ruby Grigsby and Harry Moon.

== Murder of wife and execution ==
McCue's wife was murdered with a shotgun and had been struck on the head on September 4, 1904. McCue originally had raised suspicion that a stable boy was the culprit. McCue was arrested for the murder the following day.

McCue was convicted of first degree murder and sentenced to death. His execution was scheduled for January 20, 1905, but was delayed by the governor to allow the case to pass to the Supreme Court of Appeals. The appeal was subsequently rejected. McCue was executed by hanging at the Albemarle County Jail in Charlottesville on the morning of February 10, 1905.
