= Thomas C. Elder =

American lawyer

Thomas Claybrook Elder (April 16, 1834 - November 22, 1904) was a Civil War soldier and a Virginia lawyer who served as a president of The Virginia Bar Association.

During the War, Elder served on the staffs of Roger Atkinson Pryor and Edward A. Perry. Elder's wartime correspondence with his wife, Anna Fitzhugh Elder, has been frequently cited as an original source, and a collection is kept by the Virginia Historical Society.

After the War, Elder practiced law in Staunton, Virginia. Elder served as a member of the board of visitors of the Virginia Institution for the Deaf and Dumb and the Blind at Staunton. He later served as president of the Bar Association for the year 1901-1902.
