= Alexander Hamilton (Virginia lawyer) =

American politician (1851–1916)

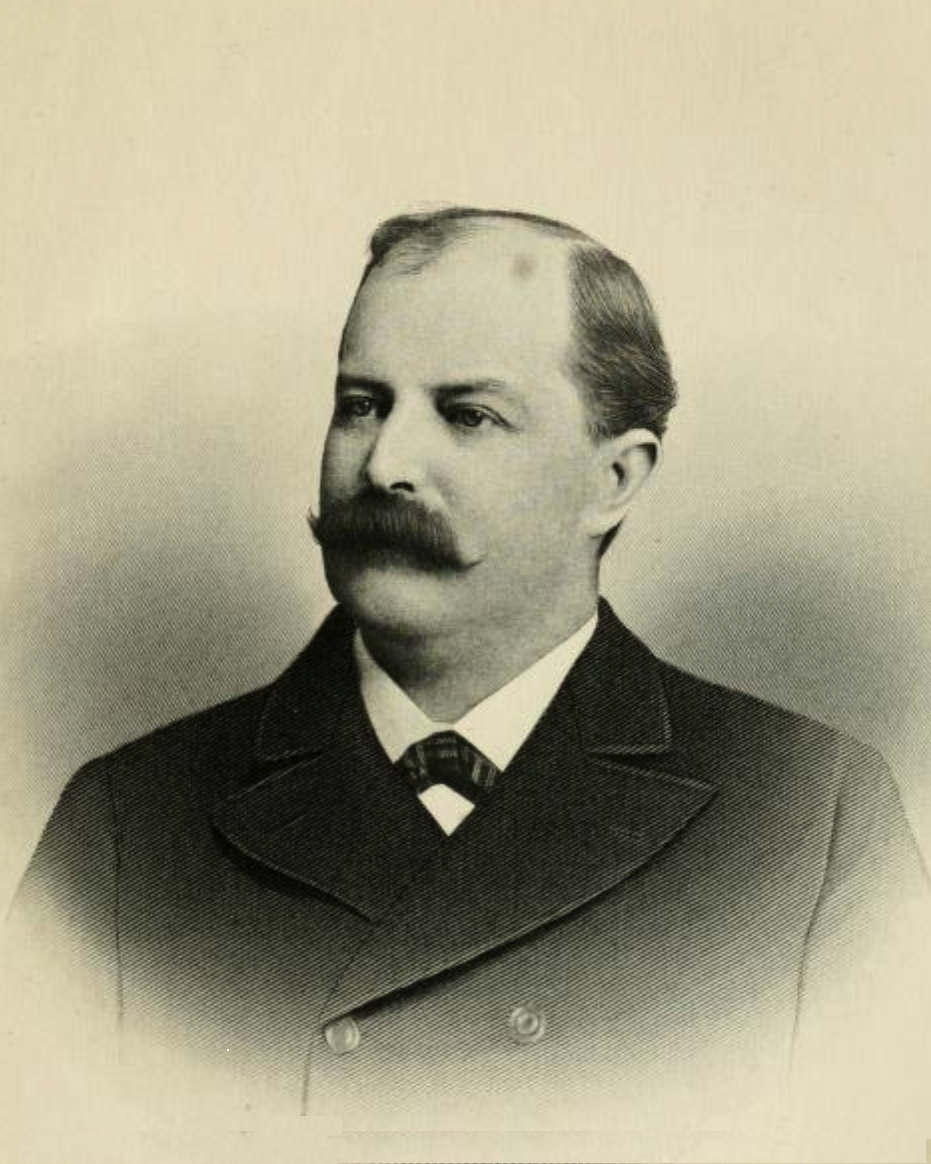
Alexander Hamilton

Alexander Hamilton (March 18, 1851 – February 4, 1916) was an American railroad lawyer and businessman, who served as a president of The Virginia Bar Association, and as a delegate to the Virginia Constitutional Convention of 1901-1902.

== Biography ==
Alexander Hamilton was born in Williamsboro, North Carolina on March 18, 1851. He graduated from the Virginia Military Institute in 1871, and was an assistant professor of Latin and tactics there for two years.

He was married three times, to Mary Stuart Donnan, Kate M. Venable, and Helen Leslie McGill.

He died at his home in Petersburg, Virginia on February 4, 1916, and was buried at Blandford Cemetery.
