= Mechums River =

Coordinates: 38°05′01″N 78°37′29″W

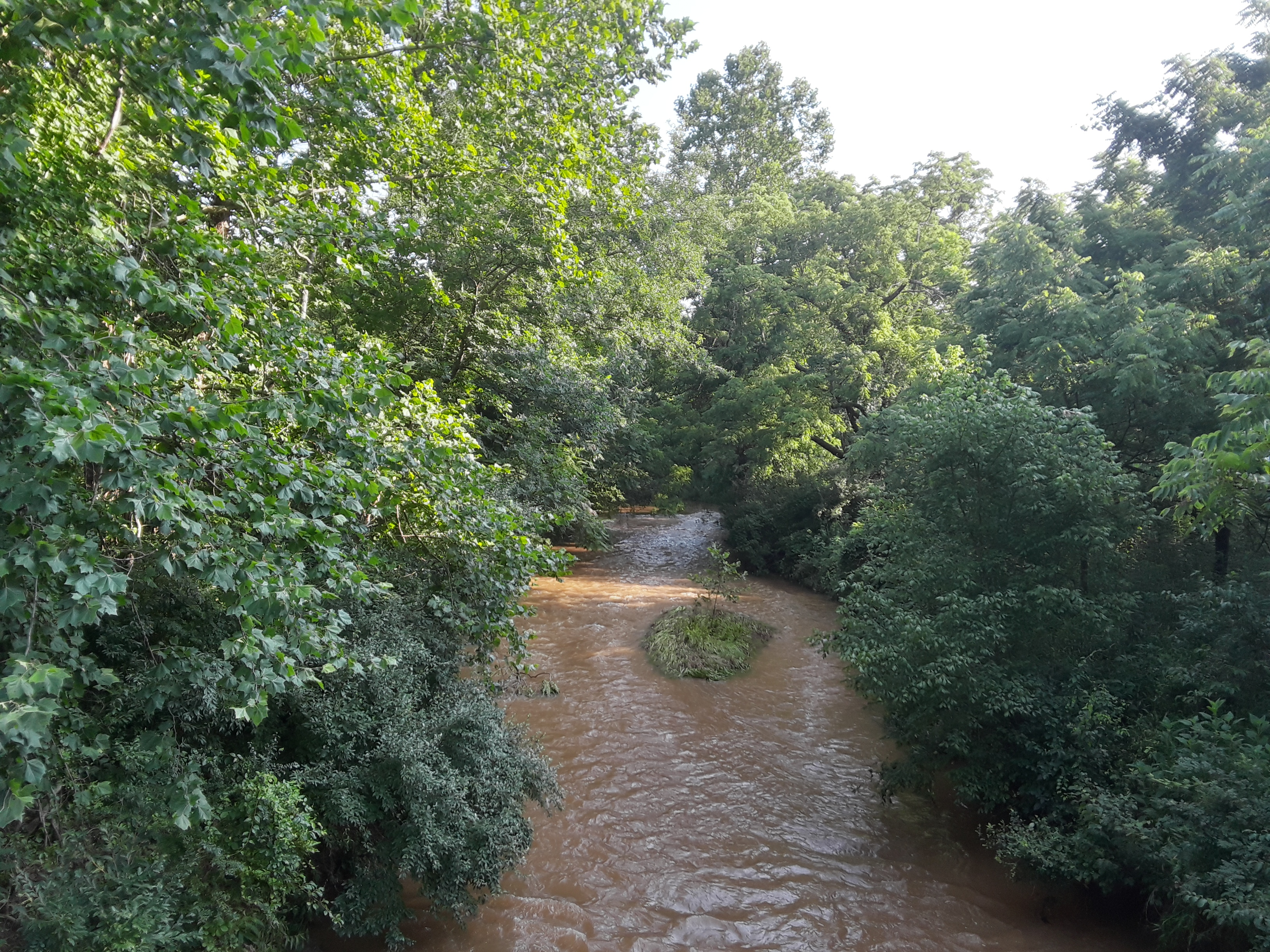
- The Mechums River near Batesville

Location
- Country: United States

Physical characteristics
- Length: 25.5 miles (41.0 km)

The Mechums River is a 25.5-mile-long (41.0 km) tributary of the South Fork of the Rivanna River in central Virginia in the United States. Via the Rivanna and James rivers, it is part of the watershed of Chesapeake Bay.

== Course ==
The Mechums River rises in northern Nelson County and flows for the remainder of its course in northwestern Albemarle County. It flows generally northeastwardly and joins the Moormans River to form the South Fork of the Rivanna River about 7 miles (11 km) northwest of Charlottesville.

== See also ==
- List of Virginia rivers

== Sources ==
- DeLorme (2005). Virginia Atlas & Gazetteer. Yarmouth, Maine: DeLorme. ISBN 0-89933-326-5.
- U.S. Geological Survey Geographic Names Information System: Mechums River
