= Robert M. Hughes =

American lawyer

Robert Morton Hughes (September 10, 1855 – January 15, 1940) was a Virginia lawyer who served as a president of The Virginia Bar Association and helped establish what became Old Dominion University in Norfolk, Virginia. He is buried in Elmwood Cemetery.

== Family ==
Hughes was born in the house of his mother's adoptive parents, Gov. John B. Floyd and Sally Preston Floyd at Abingdon, Virginia. Through his parents, Judge Robert W. Hughes and Eliza Johnston Hughes, he was related to many of Western Virginia's prominent families. Hughes spent most of his early life in Abingdon.

== Education ==
Hughes entered the College of William and Mary in 1870 at the age of 15 and graduated with an A. B. degree in 1873. His association with William and Mary continued for the rest of his life. Hughes was president of the Alumni Association for 1892-93, and served on the college's Board of Visitors from 1893 to 1918 and was rector from 1905 to 1918. In 1920, the College awarded him an honorary doctor of laws degree. In 1933, Hughes was the commencement speaker. Washington & Lee University gave him an honorary doctorate of laws degree in 1926. Hughes was a member of the Virginia State Board of Education from 1930-1935. For his part in establishing what became Old Dominion University, in 1959, the Robert M. Hughes Memorial Library was named for him.

== Law ==
Hughes also attended the University of Virginia Law School and earned a degree in 1877. After being admitted to the bar this same year, Hughes set up practice in Norfolk, Virginia, where he would continue to work until his retirement in 1920. His specialty was admiralty law. Hughes was elected president of the Virginia Bar Association in 1895. He was chairman of the Virginia Board of Bar Examiners from 1910-1923.

== Politics ==
Hughes was a lifelong Republican, following the lead of his father, but at the wrong moment in Virginia history. An unsuccessful Republican candidate for congress in 1902 and 1904, Hughes also failed in several attempts to be appointed to federal judgeships, beginning in 1897 when he sought to succeed his father as a judge in the district court at Norfolk. Hughes was a staunch conservative and the last years of his life found him ardently opposing the New Deal in general and Roosevelt's attacks on the Supreme Court in particular.

== Historian ==
Hughes's main interest outside the law was Virginia history and, in particular, the roles played by members of his own family. He felt particularly duty bound to defend the reputations of two close relatives: Gov. Floyd, his adoptive maternal grandfather, and Gen. Joseph E. Johnston, his maternal great uncle. Johnston asked Hughes to write his official biography. In the dedication to Hughes's volume on Johnston, he wrote: "I take pride in dedicating to the Army of Tennessee, as a tribute to its constancy and valor, this sketch of the Great Captain, who led it in its palmy days, and with whose renown it is inseparably associated."

== Social ==
Hughes was the fourth president of The Poetry Society of Virginia. Most of his poetry remained unpublished, as per his wishes. Following is one of his poems:

January 1st, 1915

Come, fill your cups, the dying year
Shall promptly be forgotten
With such a brew why need we care
For falling price of cotton?

Here's to the New Year's natal day!
What has it in its keeping,
Naught spared from fratricidal fray
But widow's eyes for weeping?

Or peace, and Christian love outpoured
To nurse the maimed and needy,
And plenty, lavishing her hoard
In noble succor speedy?

No matter. Friends still gather round;
Home ties are still unbroken;
Then may the new-born year abound
With blessings yet unspoken!
