= Virginia Bar Association =

US voluntary organization of lawyers

The Virginia Bar Association
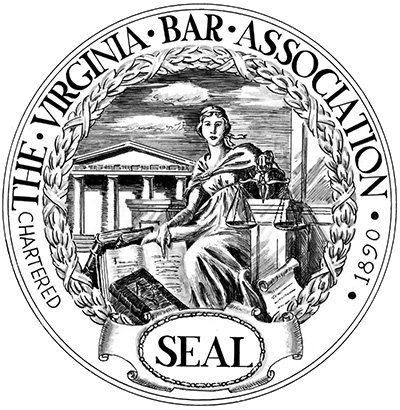
- Seal of the organization

- Logo of the organization
- Formation: July 6, 1888; 137 years ago
- Founded at: Virginia Beach, Virginia, U.S.
- Type: Voluntary bar association, 501(c)(3) organization
- Headquarters: Richmond, Virginia, U.S.
- Location: United States
- President: W. Ryan Snow
- Website: www.vba.org
- Formerly called: The Virginia State Bar Association (1888–1938)

The Virginia Bar Association (VBA) is a voluntary organization of lawyers, judges and law school faculty and students in Virginia, with offices in Richmond, Virginia. Key elements are advocacy, professionalism, service and collegiality. It provides services to its members such as assistance in law office management, promotes or opposes selected state legislation and the administration of justice, and publishes the VBA Journal. It is to be distinguished from the Virginia State Bar, which is the administrative agency of the Supreme Court of Virginia. Virginia is one of three states that has both a statewide voluntary and mandatory bar association.

== VBA Mission ==
The VBA states its mission as follows:

"The Virginia Bar Association is the independent voice of the Virginia lawyer, advancing the highest ideals of the profession through advocacy and volunteer service."

== History ==
The VBA, (originally named the Virginia State Bar Association (VSBA)), was founded in July 1888 in Virginia Beach, under the leadership of Francis H. McGuire of the Richmond Bar Association. Its first president was William J. Robertson of Charlottesville.

In 1890, the Virginia General Assembly passed an act incorporating the Virginia State Bar Association. Section 1 of the act provides: "Be it enacted by the General Assembly of Virginia, That William J. Robertson, R.G.H. Kean, Thomas Tabb, John W. Riely, James A. Walker, Holmes Conrad, Frank V. Winston, S. Ferguson Beach, John H. Fulton, Charles A. Graves, Richard B. Tunstall, James C. Lamb, Charles M. Blackford, William J. Leake, Thomas S. Martin, Alexander Hamilton, James E. Heath, Micajah Woods, George M. Harrison, F.H. McGuire, and such other persons as are now associated with them in the unincorporated society known as the Virginia State Bar Association, or as may be hereafter associated with them under this charter, be, and they are hereby, incorporated under the corporate name of 'The Virginia State Bar Association,' for the purpose of cultivating and advancing the science of jurisprudence, facilitating the administration of justice in this State, and upholding and elevating the standard of honor, integrity, and courtesy in the legal profession."

In 1938, after the Virginia State Bar was created as a state-controlled regulatory association, the name of the older, voluntary membership organization was changed to the current Virginia Bar Association.

== VBA on Main ==
In 2017, the VBA moved offices to the Bank of America Center, 1111 E. Main St., Suite 905, and opened a member center for association business and for attorney use. Called VBA on Main, its combination of work/study carrels, four conference rooms, printer/scanner access, private phone room, and refreshment and relaxation areas are unique among bar groups in the commonwealth.

== See also ==
- Virginia State Bar
- List of presidents of the Virginia Bar Association
