= R. Walton Moore =

American politician (1859–1941)

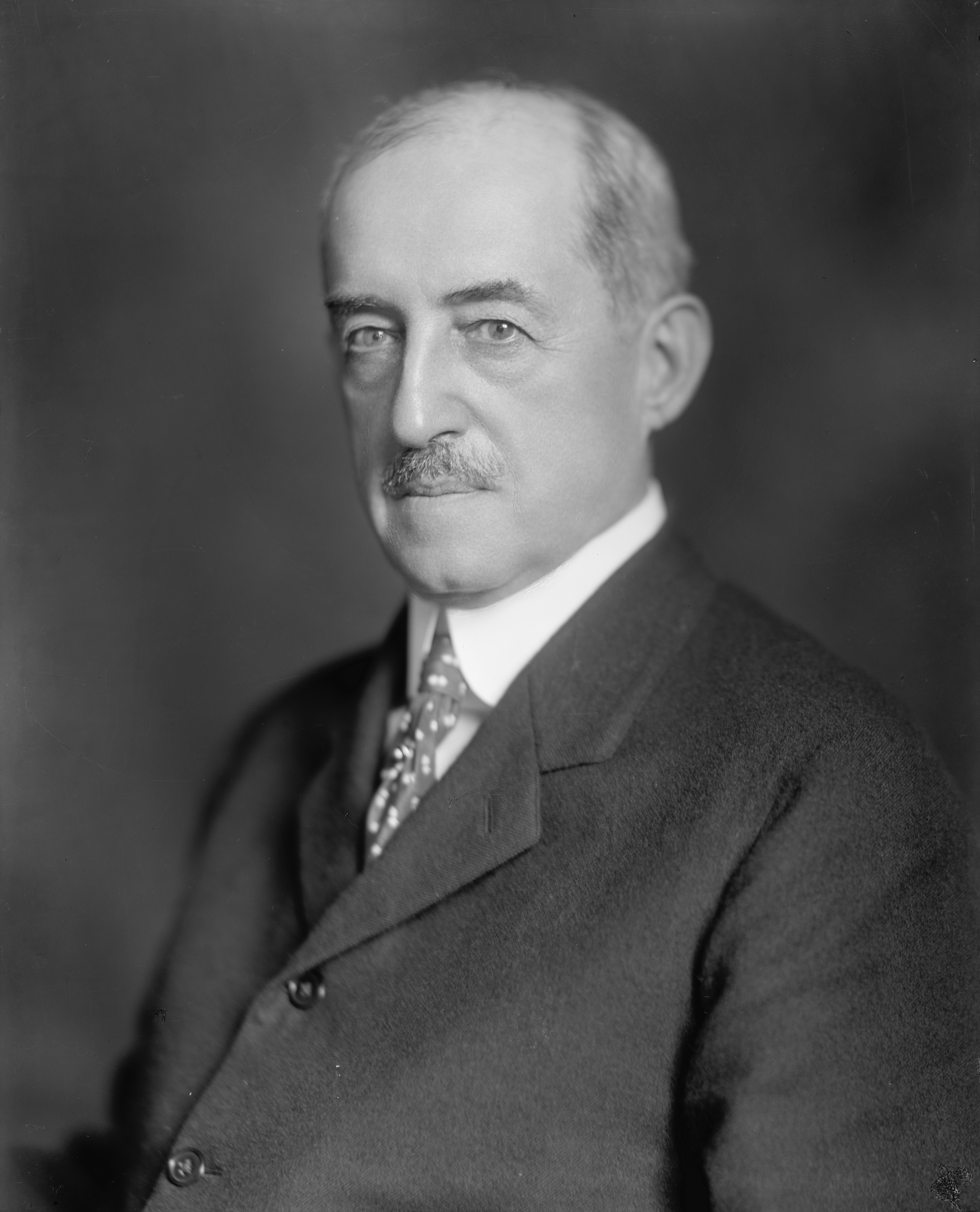

5th Counselor of the United States Department of State
- In office May 21, 1937 – February 8, 1941
- President: Franklin D. Roosevelt
- Preceded by: Frank Polk
- Succeeded by: Benjamin V. Cohen

Member of the U.S. House of Representatives from Virginia's 8th district
- In office April 27, 1919 – March 3, 1931
- Preceded by: Charles C. Carlin
- Succeeded by: Howard W. Smith

Member of the Virginia Senate from the 14th district
- In office December 7, 1887 – December 2, 1891
- Preceded by: Elisha E. Meredith
- Succeeded by: George A. Mushbach

Personal details
- Born: Robert Walton Moore; February 6, 1859 Fairfax, Virginia, U.S.
- Died: February 8, 1941 (aged 82) Fairfax, Virginia, U.S.
- Resting place: Fairfax City Cemetery
- Party: Democratic
- Education: University of Virginia
- Profession: Lawyer

Robert Walton Moore (February 6, 1859 – February 8, 1941) was an American politician. A lifelong resident of Fairfax, Virginia, he served as a state senator, member of the Virginia Constitutional Convention of 1902, with the Interstate Commerce Commission and in the United States House of Representatives from 8th Congressional District. One of few Virginia politicians to embrace the New Deal, Moore interrupted his retirement to serve as Assistant Secretary of State until his death.

== Early and family life ==
Born in Fairfax, Virginia to lawyer Thomas Moore (1819-1899) of Fairfax and his wife (the former Hannah Morris (1835-1912) of Gilbertsville, New York), Moore had five younger sisters who survived to adulthood: Susan Lindsay Moore Donohoe (1862-1888) (wife of S. R. Donohoe, state senator and editor of the Fairfax Herald), Jennie Morris Moore (1868-1940), Helen Stuyvesant Moore (1868-1954; her twin Billie among the siblings dying as infants), Edith M. Keith (who married her brother's law partner Thomas R. Keith) and Margaret Lindsay Moore (1873-1953).

Moore later took pride that his ancestors included the Lindsays on the paternal side and Lewis Morris (signer of the Declaration of Independence) and his son General Jacob Morris (brother of Gouverneur Morris) on the maternal side. His paternal great grandfather Jeremiah Moore, an early Baptist minister who had been imprisoned for his religious dissent, married Lydia Renno and moved from Stafford County to Fairfax County, where descendants continued to farm. His grandfather served in the War of 1812 and married Susan Lindsay. His father Thomas Moore served as a soldier in the Mexican War and in the Confederate States Army during American Civil War, then as deputy clerk of Court. While continuing his legal practice, Thomas Moore also served as the first Superintendent of the Fairfax County Public Schools beginning in 1870.

Young Robert Moore attended the private schools, then Episcopal High School in Alexandria. He then studied at the University of Virginia at Charlottesville, where he was a member of Chi Phi fraternity. The College of William and Mary later awarded him a Phi Beta Kappa key and honorary LLD, and he was active in the Phi Beta Kappa society in Washington, D.C. A lifetime bachelor, Moore lived with his unmarried sisters in Fairfax City (or later Washington when a Congressman and Congress was in session) and served on the vestry of Truro Episcopal Church.

== Career ==
Moore taught in the Fairfax schools while studying for the bar under the supervision of a local judge. He was admitted to the bar in 1880 and practiced in Virginia and Washington, D.C., initially with his father, then with Mr. Keith as Moore & Keith and later as senior partner at Moore, Barbour & Keith.

From 1907 until World War I Moore was special counsel for Southern carriers in cases before the Interstate Commerce Commission, the United States Commerce Court, and the United States Supreme Court, which limited his private legal practice. Active in the Virginia Bar Association, Moore served as its president in 1911. He was assistant general counsel of the United States Railroad Administration in 1918 and 1919.

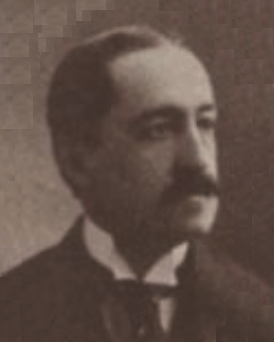
Moore as a delegate to the 1901–1902 state constitutional convention

=== Virginia politics ===
Voters in Alexandria, Fairfax and Prince William Counties elected Moore to the Virginia State Senate, where he served one term (1887-1890) in the part-time position, succeeding Elisha E. Meredith. Active in Democratic Party politics, Moore was a presidential elector for Grover Cleveland in 1892. In 1896 Moore was mentioned as a candidate for the U.S. Congress, but did not receive the party's nomination (fellow Democrat John Franklin Rixey being elected instead). Although later known as a maverick within the state party, Moore declined to run for U.S. Senate against incumbent Democratic Senator Thomas S. Martin in 1898.

Fairfax County voters elected Moore to the State constitutional convention in 1901 and 1902, in which his young law partner John S. Barbour represented Culpeper County. As chairman of the committee on the legislative department and member of the finance and revision committees, Moore promoted better highways and funding for public schools. That convention would become known for creating the State Corporation Commission, as well as for disenfranchising African American and poor white voters, contributing to the growth of Senator Martin's political organization that later became the Byrd Organization. Moore, had personal misgivings about the proclamation method to put it into effect. Rather than submit it to voters as had the 1869 document it would supersede, he proposed that it would become effective when approved by the General Assembly, as eventually happened. Nonetheless, Moore and state senator C. O'Conor Goolrick (of Fredericksburg, Virginia and first elected in 1908) were considered mavericks, beyond organization control.

Moore served on the boards of visitors of both the College of William and Mary and the University of Virginia. On December 7, 1922, he was appointed a member of the Board of Regents of the Smithsonian Institution. He also served as vice-president of the Virginia Historical Society and as a board member of the Library of Virginia.

=== U.S. Representative ===
Voters of Virginia's 8th congressional district elected Moore as a Democrat to the Sixty-sixth Congress in a special election to fill the vacancy caused by the resignation of Charles Creighton Carlin, who had succeeded Rixey for the seat that Moore had wanted in 1896. Moore was re-elected five times, serving from April 27, 1919, to March 3, 1931. He was a ranking member of the Foreign Affairs Committee although a member of the minority party. He declined re-election in 1930, as he was beyond normal retirement age. He nonetheless served two years as a member of the State Board of Education after his retirement. His successor was Howard W. Smith, a lieutenant in the Byrd Organization during Massive Resistance.

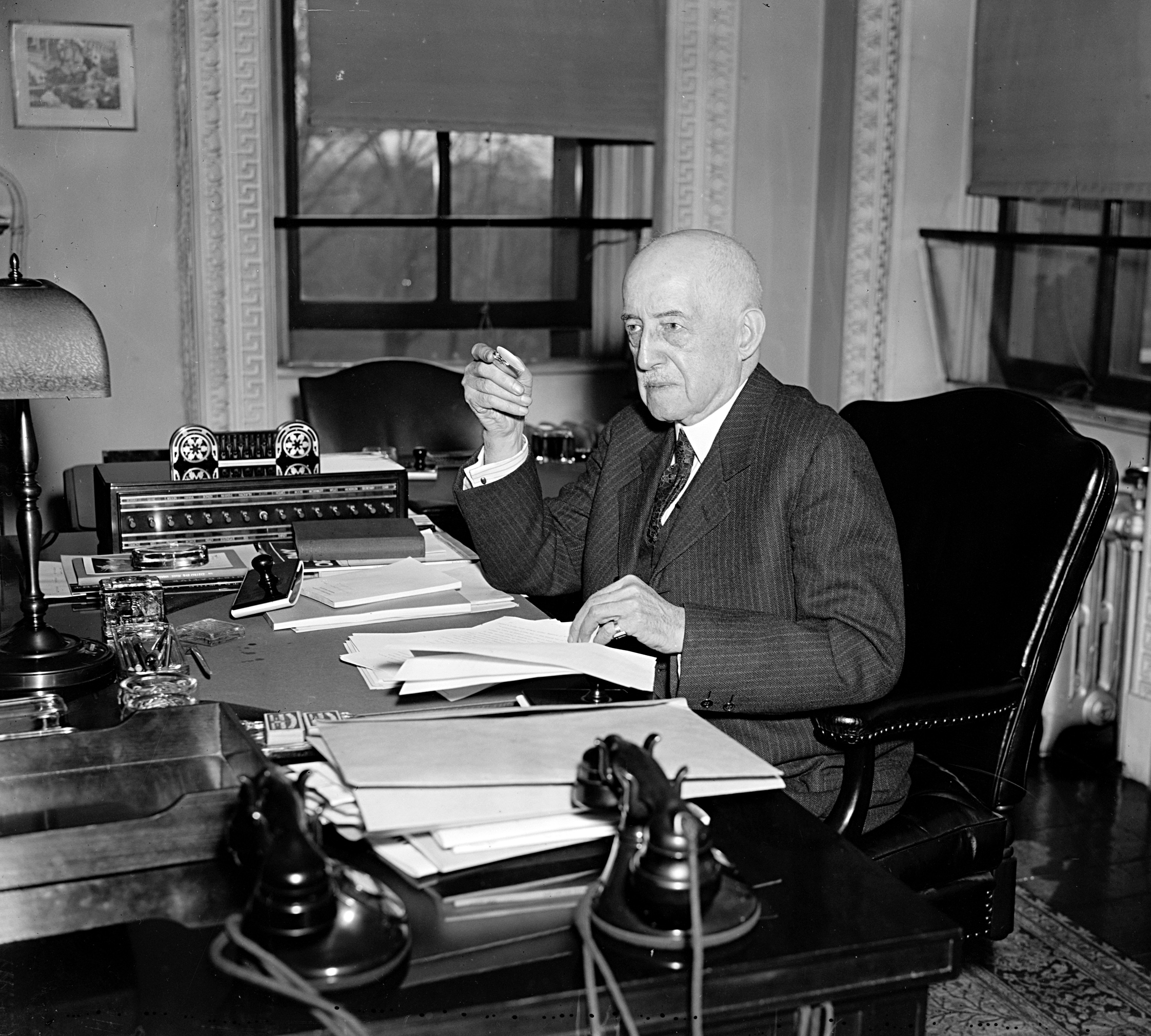
Moore in his office at the State Department in 1937

=== New Dealer ===
His close friend and political ally, Secretary of State Cordell Hull convinced Moore to join the "Brain Trust" of President Franklin D. Roosevelt, succeeding Professor Raymond Moley. He became an Assistant Secretary of State, where he worked under Secretary of State Hull beginning September 19, 1933, and took Hull's place during travels. Many other Virginia Democrats followed the lead of Senator Harry F. Byrd and opposed the New Deal. Moore handled some patronage in the state, and advised Roosevelt to help Governor James Hubert Price as well as Judge Floyd H. Roberts of Bristol, Virginia, whom Byrd's ally Senator Carter Glass found "personally offensive."

In 1937, Hull needed to fill the most important position in the Department, Under Secretary of State. His two principal candidates were Moore and Sumner Welles, Assistant Secretary of State for Latin American Affairs (a close ally and favorite of the President). Hull promised Moore the post, but never forced the issue with President Roosevelt. Eventually, Welles won the position, but Moore's appointment as the Department Counselor was announced at the same time. Though both Moore and Welles gained new titles, Welles took the position they both wanted. Moore served as Chairman of the Board of Trustees of the Import-Export Banks, as well as on the Central Committee of the American Red Cross, among other committees. In subsequent years (until his death in 1941), Moore worked on issues including legal questions, aviation, and arms control.

In late 1940, when Welles made homosexual propositions to two railroad porters, the matter was initially hushed up. Moore learned of the incident from his friend Ernest Norris, president of the Southern Railway. Norris gave Moore affidavits from the men involved, and just before his death, Moore passed them to former ambassador William C. Bullitt, who eventually forced Welles' resignation in 1943.

== Death and legacy ==
Moore died in Fairfax, Virginia on February 8, 1941, after an illness of two months. Virginia Theological Seminary Dean Alexander C. Zabriskie and Rev. Gray Temple officiated at his funeral at Truro church, which was attended by Secretary of State Hull, Virginia's governor Price, White House representatives, four U.S. Congressmen (S. Otis Bland, Thomas G. Burch, Colgate Darden, Howard W. Smith), many diplomats and neighbors (including pallbearers Francis Pickens Miller and state senator John W. Rust) as well as at least two of his sisters. Moore was then interred in the Fairfax City Cemetery beside his parents.

The Liberty ship SS R. Walton Moore was named in his honor in 1944. His papers, including an unpublished autobiography, are at the Franklin D. Roosevelt Library in Hyde Park, New York.

U.S. House of Representatives
Preceded by Charles C. Carlin	Member of the U.S. House of Representatives from Virginia's 8th congressional district 1919–1931	Succeeded by Howard W. Smith
