= William H. Fowle =

American politician (1838–1903)

Member of the Virginia House of Delegates for Alexandria City and Alexandria
- In office December 1, 1875 – March 29, 1876 Serving with George L. Simpson
- Preceded by: J. C. O'Neal and John B. Syphax
- Succeeded by: M. D. Ball

Personal details
- Born: 1838 Alexandria, Virginia, U.S.
- Died: December 6, 1903 (aged 64–65) Washington, D.C., U.S.
- Resting place: Ivy Hill Cemetery; Alexandria, Virginia, U.S.
- Spouse: Maima Happer
- Children: 5
- Occupation: Politician

Military service
- Rank: Captain
- Unit: 17th Virginia Infantry
- Battles/wars: American Civil War

William H. Fowle (1838 – December 6, 1903) was an American politician from Virginia. He served as a member of the Virginia House of Delegates for Alexandria City and Alexandria from 1875 to 1876.

== Early life ==
William H. Fowle was born in 1838 in Alexandria, Virginia, to William H. Fowle. He was being trained in business up until the outbreak of the Civil War.

== Career ==
At the outbreak of the war, Fowle joined Company H of the 17th Virginia Infantry Regiment as a lieutenant. He attained the rank of captain. After the war, Fowle traveled abroad and then worked in the mercantile business with his brother-in-law.

Fowle was a member of the city council of Alexandria. He was elected as a "conservative" for the Virginia House of Delegates. He represented Alexandria City and Alexandria from December 1, 1875, to March 29, 1876, in the House, serving alongside Mayor George L. Simpson.

During President Grover Cleveland's first term, Fowle served as deputy collector of internal revenue in Alexandria. Fowle moved to Staunton and was appointed first assistant under Ham Shepherd, the internal revenue collector for the western district of Virginia. He then moved to Lynchburg and Shepherd later appointed Fowle during Cleveland's second term as his first assistant. Fowle then succeeded Fitzhugh Lee as acting collector, but was not appointed to the role. He was succeeded by the appointment of Park Agnew in April 1897.

== Personal life ==
Fowle married Maima Happer of Halifax, North Carolina. They had one daughter and four sons, Nela, W. Holmes, Willis Happer, A. Herbert and James H.

Fowle died on December 6, 1903, at his home, 2401 Pennsylvania Avenue NW in Washington, D.C. He was buried in Ivy Hill Cemetery in Alexandria.
