= Hannah v. Commonwealth =

Supreme Court of Virginia case in 1929

- Court: Supreme Court of Virginia
- Full case name: Harris Hannah v. Commonwealth.
- Decided: September 19, 1929
- Citations: 149 S.E. 419; 153 Va. 863

Court membership
- Judges sitting: Robert R. Prentis, Jesse F. West, Preston White Campbell, Richard Henry Lee Chichester, Henry W. Holt

Hannah v. Commonwealth, 153 Va. 863, 149 S.E. 419 (1929) is a Supreme Court of Virginia case that is often cited for distinguishing the "heat of passion" from malice as the motive in a crime. The formulation is:

'Malice aforethought' implies a mind under the sway of reason, whereas 'passion' whilst it does not imply a dethronement of reason, yet it is the furor brevis, which renders a man deaf to the voice of reason so that, although the act was intentional to death, it was not the result of malignity of heart, but imputable to human infirmity. Passion and malice are, therefore, inconsistent motive powers, and hence an act which proceeds from the one, cannot also proceed from the other.
