= George L. Simpson =

American politician (died 1907)

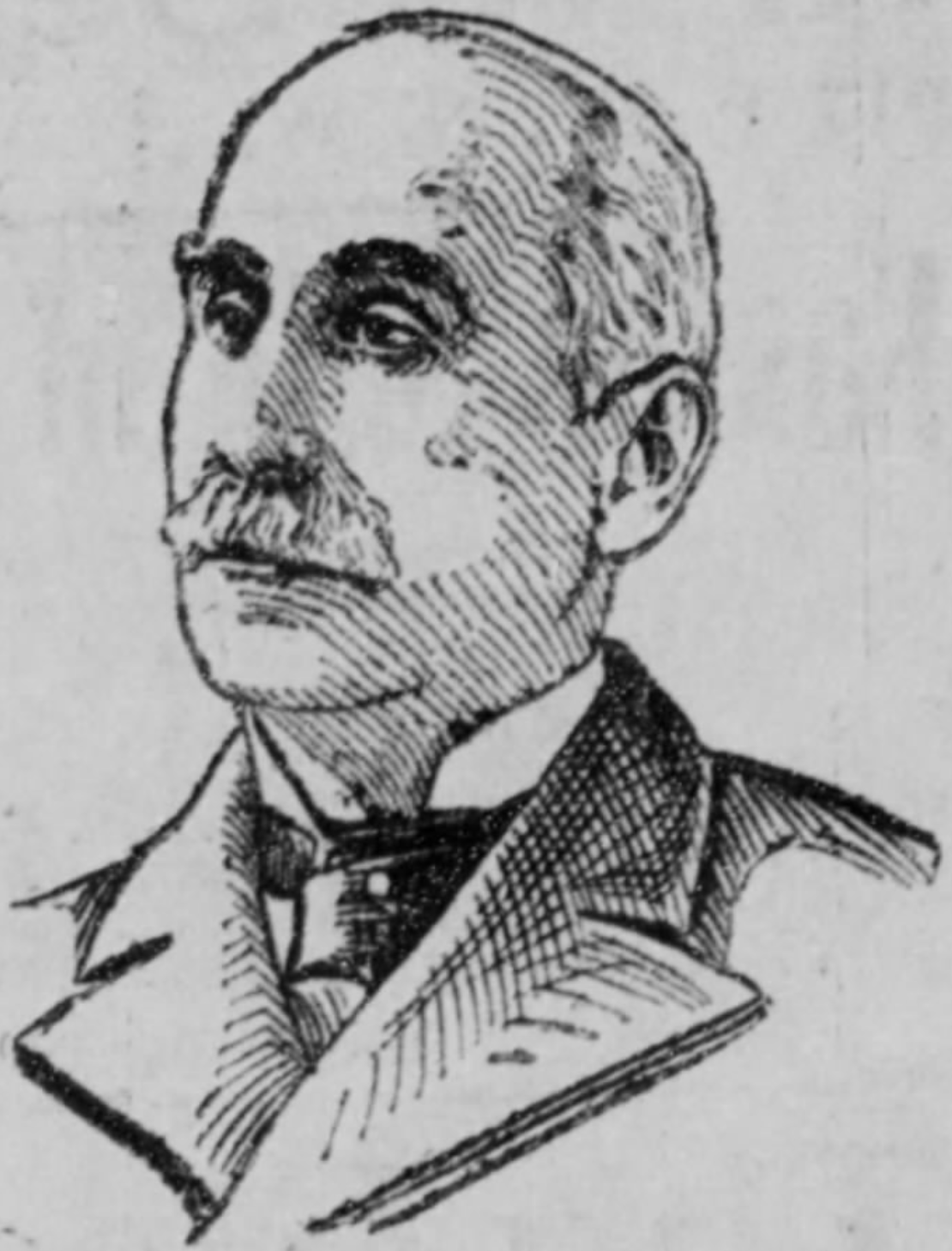
- Sketch of Simpson in 1907 newspaper

Member of the Virginia House of Delegates for Alexandria City and Alexandria
- In office December 1, 1875 – March 29, 1876 Serving with William H. Fowle
- Preceded by: J. C. O'Neal and John B. Syphax
- Succeeded by: M. D. Ball

Personal details
- Born: Alexandria, Virginia, U.S.
- Died: April 20, 1907 (aged 64) Alexandria, Virginia, U.S.
- Resting place: Methodist Protestant Cemetery
- Children: 2
- Occupation: Politician

George L. Simpson (died April 20, 1907) was an American politician from Virginia. He served as a member of the Virginia House of Delegates from 1875 to 1876. He was the mayor of Alexandria from 1897 to 1904.

== Early life ==
George L. Simpson was born in Alexandria, Virginia, to Henry L. Simpson. He worked with his father in a boot and shoe business on Royal Street in Alexandria.

== Career ==
Simpson served as a member of the common council of Alexandria, representing the second ward. He was a member of the Virginia House of Delegates, representing Alexandria and Alexandria County, from December 1, 1875, to March 29, 1876, alongside William H. Fowle.

In 1897, Simpson was elected mayor of Alexandria. He served until 1904, when he lost a re-election campaign. He worked as alderman of the third ward following the resignation of S. P. Fisher. He served in that role until his death. He owned a store at 104 North Royal Street in Alexandria.

== Personal life ==
Simpson was married and had two sons, Robbins and French. He lived at the southwest corner of Cameron and Columbus streets in Alexandria. He was a member of the Methodist Episcopal Church South.

Simpson died on April 20, 1907, aged 64, at his store in Alexandria. He was buried at Methodist Protestant Cemetery.
