= William Duval =

William Duval may refer to:

- William Pope Duval, first civilian governor of Florida Territory
  - SS William P. Duval, a Liberty ship
- William Duval (ice hockey) (1877–1905), Canadian ice hockey player

== See also ==
- William DuVall (born 1967), American singer, guitarist and songwriter
- William P. Duvall (1847–1920), officer in the United States Army
