= SS Royal S. Copeland =

Liberty ship of WWII

History

United States
- Name: Royal S. Copeland
- Namesake: Royal S. Copeland
- Owner: War Shipping Administration (WSA)
- Operator: Parry Navigation Co.
- Ordered: as type (EC2-S-C1) hull, MC hull 1219
- Builder: St. Johns River Shipbuilding Company, Jacksonville, Florida
- Cost: $1,350,960
- Yard number: 27
- Way number: 3
- Laid down: 24 November 1943
- Launched: 11 January 1944
- Completed: 22 January 1944
- Identification: Call sign: KVMS
- Fate: Sold to France, 8 November 1946, removed from fleet, 13 December 1946

France
- Name: Les Glieres
- Owner: France
- Operator: Cie. Messageries Maritimes
- Fate: Sold, 1959

Lebanon
- Name: Nictric
- Owner: Cia. Estrella Blanc Lda.
- Operator: Wigham Richardson and Co.
- Fate: Scrapped, 1968 following Cargo fire, 14 June 1967

General characteristics
- Class & type: Liberty ship; type EC2-S-C1, standard
- Tonnage: 10,865 LT DWT; 7,176 GRT
- Displacement: 3,380 long tons (3,434 t) (light); 14,245 long tons (14,474 t) (max)
- Length: 441 feet 6 inches (135 m) oa; 416 feet (127 m) pp; 427 feet (130 m) lwl
- Beam: 57 feet (17 m)
- Draft: 27 ft 9.25 in (8.4646 m)
- Installed power: 2 × Oil fired 450 °F (232 °C) boilers, operating at 220 psi (1,500 kPa); 2,500 hp (1,900 kW)
- Propulsion: 1 × triple-expansion steam engine, (manufactured by General Machinery Corp., Hamilton, Ohio); 1 × screw propeller
- Speed: 11.5 knots (21.3 km/h; 13.2 mph)
- Capacity: 562,608 cubic feet (15,931 m^{3}) (grain); 499,573 cubic feet (14,146 m^{3}) (bale)
- Complement: 38–62 USMM; 21–40 USNAG
- Armament: Varied by ship; Bow-mounted 3-inch (76 mm)/50-caliber gun; Stern-mounted 4-inch (102 mm)/50-caliber gun; 2–8 × single 20-millimeter (0.79 in) Oerlikon anti-aircraft (AA) cannons and/or, 2–8 × 37-millimeter (1.46 in) M1 AA guns

SS Royal S. Copeland was a Liberty ship built in the United States during World War II. She was named after Royal S. Copeland, a United States senator from New York from 1923 until 1938, was an academic, homeopathic physician, and politician.

== Construction ==
Royal S. Copeland was laid down on 24 November 1943, under a Maritime Commission (MARCOM) contract, MC hull 1219, by the St. Johns River Shipbuilding Company, Jacksonville, Florida; and was launched on 11 January 1944.

== History ==
She was allocated to Parry Navigation Co., on 22 January 1944. On 7 June 1946, she was laid up in the James River Reserve Fleet, Jones Point, New York. She was sold, 8 November 1946, to France, for $544,506, for commercial use. She was removed from the fleet on 13 December 1946.

Royal S. Copeland was renamed Les Glieres in 1947. She was sold to Cia. Estrella Blanca, in 1959, reflagged in Lebanon, and renamed Nictric. On 14 June 1967, her cargo of coal caught fire in Chittagong Roads. She was scrapped in 1968 in Taiwan.

== Bibliography ==
- "St. John's River Shipbuilding, Jacksonville FL". www.ShipbuildingHistory.com. 16 October 2010.
- Maritime Administration. "Royal S. Copeland". Ship History Database Vessel Status Card. U.S. Department of Transportation, Maritime Administration.
- Davies, James (May 2004). "Specifications (As-Built)" (PDF). p. 23.
- "SS Royal S. Copeland".
