= Elisha E. Meredith =

American politician

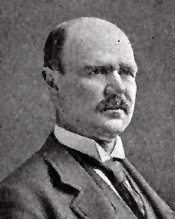

Member of the U.S. House of Representatives from Virginia's 8th district
- In office December 9, 1891 – March 3, 1897
- Preceded by: William H. F. Lee
- Succeeded by: John F. Rixey

Member of the Virginia Senate from the 14th district
- In office December 5, 1883 – December 7, 1887
- Preceded by: Francis L. Smith
- Succeeded by: R. Walton Moore

Personal details
- Born: Elisha Edward Meredith; December 26, 1848 Sumter, Alabama, U.S.
- Died: July 29, 1900 (aged 51) Manassas, Virginia, U.S.
- Resting place: Manassas Cemetery
- Party: Democratic
- Education: Hampden–Sydney College
- Profession: lawyer

Elisha Edward Meredith (December 26, 1848 – July 29, 1900) was a U.S. representative from Virginia.

== Biography ==
Born in Sumter County, Alabama, Meredith attended Hampden–Sydney College, Virginia. He studied law. He was admitted to the bar in 1869 and commenced practice in Prince William County. He served as prosecuting attorney for Prince William County 1876-1883. He served as member of the Senate of Virginia in 1883–1887.

In 1891 E. E. Meredith and Robert R. Campbell were the court appointed attorneys for Joseph Dye and Lee R. Heflin, white farm workers, who were tried for the murder of a white Fauquier County, Virginia, family (a widow and her three young children) during a robbery. The killers attempted to cover up their crime by burning the house. After the two killers were convicted and sentenced to death they were taken from sheriff’s deputies transporting them to another jail and lynched in Prince William County, Virginia.

Meredith was elected as a Democrat to the Fifty-second Congress to fill the vacancy caused by the death of William H.F. Lee. He was reelected to the Fifty-third and Fifty-fourth Congresses and served from December 9, 1891, to March 3, 1897. He resumed the practice of his profession. He died in Manassas, Virginia, on July 29, 1900. He was interred in Manassas Cemetery.

== Sources ==
- United States Congress. "Elisha E. Meredith (id: M000647)". Biographical Directory of the United States Congress.

U.S. House of Representatives
Preceded by William H. F. Lee	Member of the U.S. House of Representatives from Virginia's 8th congressional district 1891–1897	Succeeded by John F. Rixey
