= 11th Virginia Cavalry Regiment =

- Flag of Virginia, 1861
- Active: June 1862 – April 1865
- Disbanded: April 1865
- Country: Confederate States of America
- Allegiance: Virginia
- Branch: Confederate States Army
- Role: Cavalry
- Engagements: Battle of Antietam; Battle of Fredericksburg; Battle of Chancellorsville; Battle of Brandy Station; Battle of Gettysburg; Bristoe Campaign; Overland Campaign; Siege of Petersburg; Valley Campaigns of 1864; Appomattox Campaign; Battle of Five Forks

Commanders
- Notable commanders: Colonel Lunsford L. Lomax

The 11th Virginia Cavalry Regiment was a cavalry regiment raised in Virginia for service in the Confederate States Army during the American Civil War. It fought mostly with the Army of Northern Virginia.

The men were primarily recruited from Hardy, Hampshire, Pocahontas and Berkeley counties in what would become West Virginia, and the Virginia counties of Bath, Fairfax, Frederick, Shenandoah, Rockingham, Rockbridge, Loudoun, and Clarke.

Virginia's 11th Cavalry Regiment was organized in February, 1863, by consolidating the 17th Battalion, Virginia Cavalry, one company from the 24th Battalion Virginia Cavalry, and two companies of the 5th Virginia Cavalry Regiment.

The unit served in W.R. Jones', Lomax's, Rosser's, and J. Dearing's Brigade, Army of Northern Virginia. It was active in the conflicts at Upperville, Fairfield, Bristoe, and Mine Run. Later the regiment participated in The Wilderness Campaign, the defense of Richmond, and Early's Shenandoah Valley operations. It then disbanded as there were no members of the 11th at Appomattox.

The field officers were Colonels Oliver R. Funsten (a former state senator) and Lunsford L. Lomax, Lieutenant Colonel M.D. Ball, and Majors William H. Harness and Edward H. McDonald.

The 17th Cavalry Battalion (also called 1st Battalion) was organized in June, 1862, with seven companies. The unit fought in western Virginia and in the Maryland Campaign. Lieutenant Colonel Oliver R. Funsten and Major William Patrick were in command.

== See also ==
- List of Virginia Civil War units
- List of West Virginia Civil War Confederate units
