= Virginia Constitutional Convention of 1901–02 =

- Virginia Convention
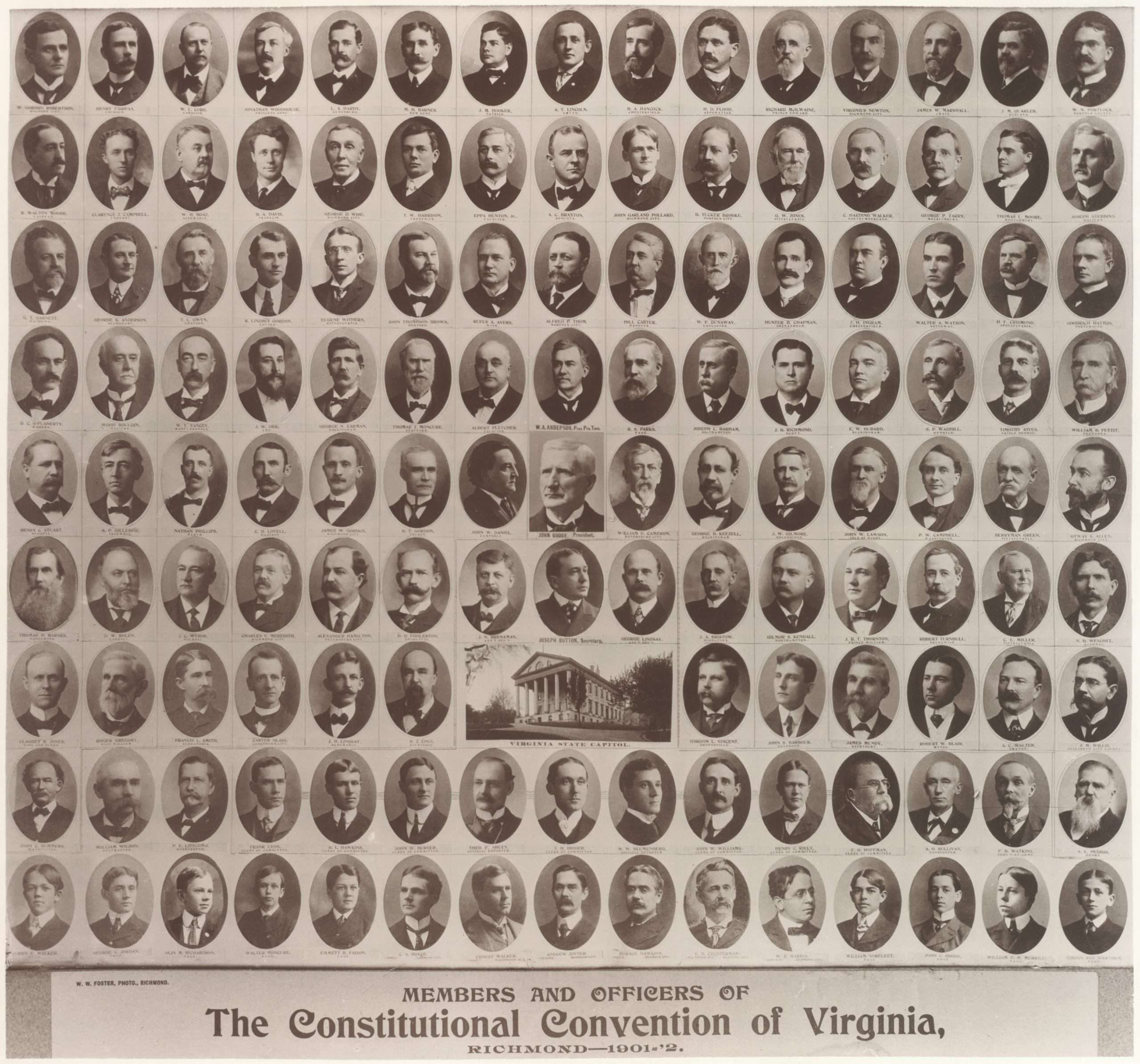
- Composite photograph of members and staff

Type
- Type: Unicameral constitutional convention

History
- Established: June 12, 1901
- Disbanded: June 26, 1902
- Preceded by: Virginia Constitutional Convention of 1868

Leadership
- President: John Goode Jr.

Structure
- Seats: 100
- Political groups: Majority (88): Democratic (88); Minority (12): Republican (11); Independent (1)

Elections
- First general election: May 23, 1901

Meeting place
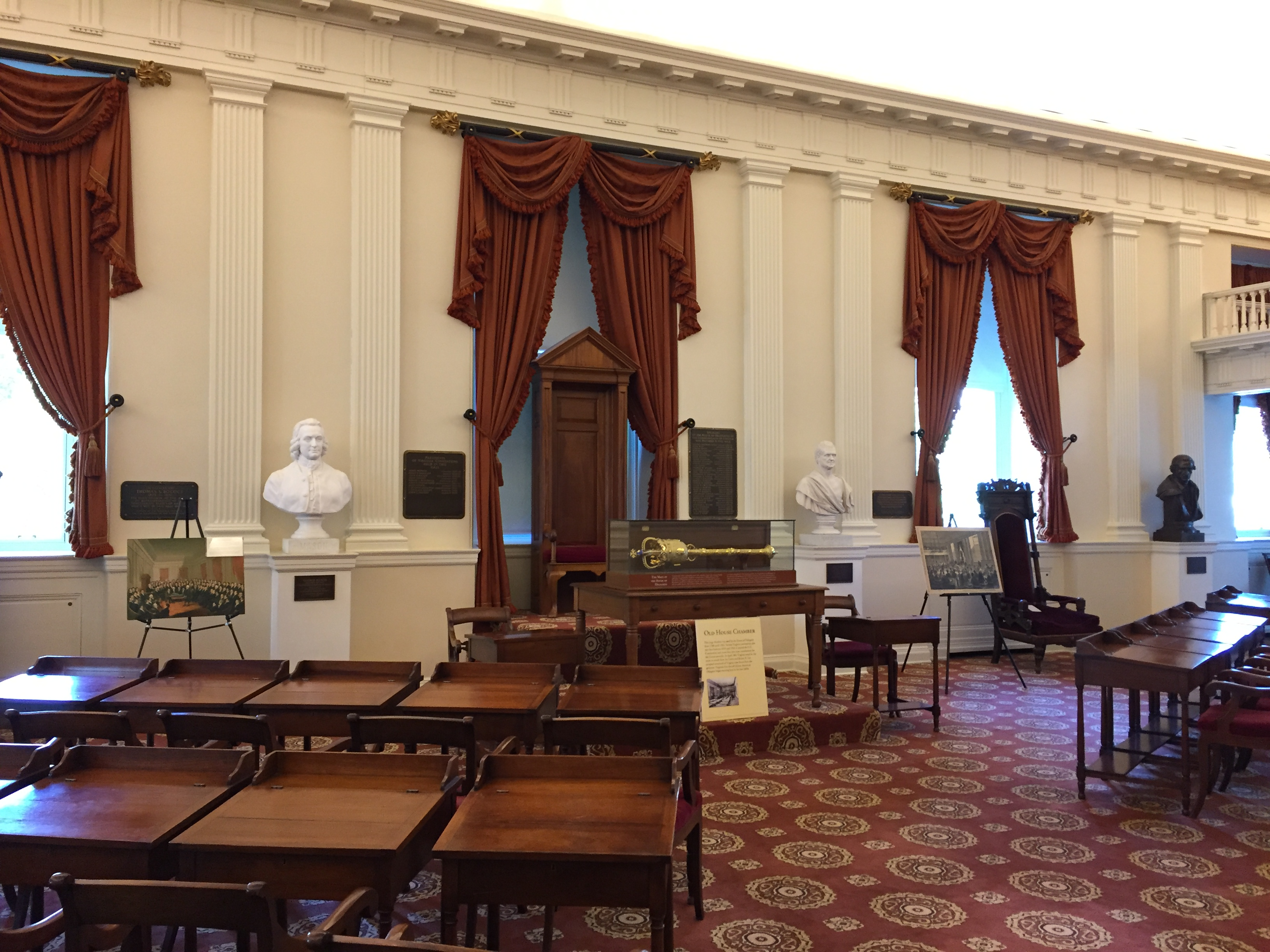
- Old House Chamber, Virginia State Capitol, Richmond, Virginia

Constitution
- Virginia Constitution of 1902

The Virginia Constitutional Convention of 1901–02 was an assembly of delegates elected by the voters to write the fundamental law of Virginia.

== Background and composition ==
In May 1900, the increasing public dismay over the electoral fraud and corruption of the Democratic machine under U.S. Senator Thomas S. Martin led to a narrow victory over the entrenched "court house crowd" in a referendum to call a constitutional convention.

Reformers seeking to expand the influence of the "better sort" of voters gained a majority by appealing to the electorate to overthrow the 1868 Underwood Constitution, that the Richmond Dispatch characterized as "that miserable apology to organic law which was forced upon Virginians by carpetbaggers, scalawags and Negroes supported by Federal bayonets".

The tone was set by the Progressive editor of the Lynchburg News, Carter Glass, who would later hold a U.S. Senate seat for 26 years, believed that the purpose of the convention was "the elimination of every Negro who can be gotten rid of, legally, without materially impairing the strength of the white electorate." Progressives also had a deep distrust of the influence railroads had over state legislatures, and Convention delegate A. Caperton Braxton of Staunton, while agreeing that "negroes should be excluded from the right to hold office in this state", was also concerned that the state regulate railroads, that the Convention had to decide whether "the people or the railroads would control the government of the Commonwealth."

== Meeting and debate ==
The Convention met from June 12, 1901 - June 26, 1902, at Richmond in the Capitol Building and elected John Goode, Jr. its presiding officer. Progressives sought to reform corrupt political practices of the Martin political machine and to regulate railroads and big corporations. Martin delegates agreed to restrict suffrage of African-Americans and illiterate whites, and a State Corporation Commission was established, but the Martin machine persisted in controlling Virginia politics until his death. The Convention's president, John Goode of Bedford City, had been a secessionist voting in Richmond's 1861 Secession Convention. He opened the Convention in 1901 explaining that voting was not a natural right, it was a "social right an must necessarily be regulated by society…", though any regulation could not violate the Constitution of the United States. While there was "no prejudice, no animosity against the members of the colored race", the wisest of Virginia's leaders had counseled against universal negro suffrage as "a crime against civilization and Christianity."

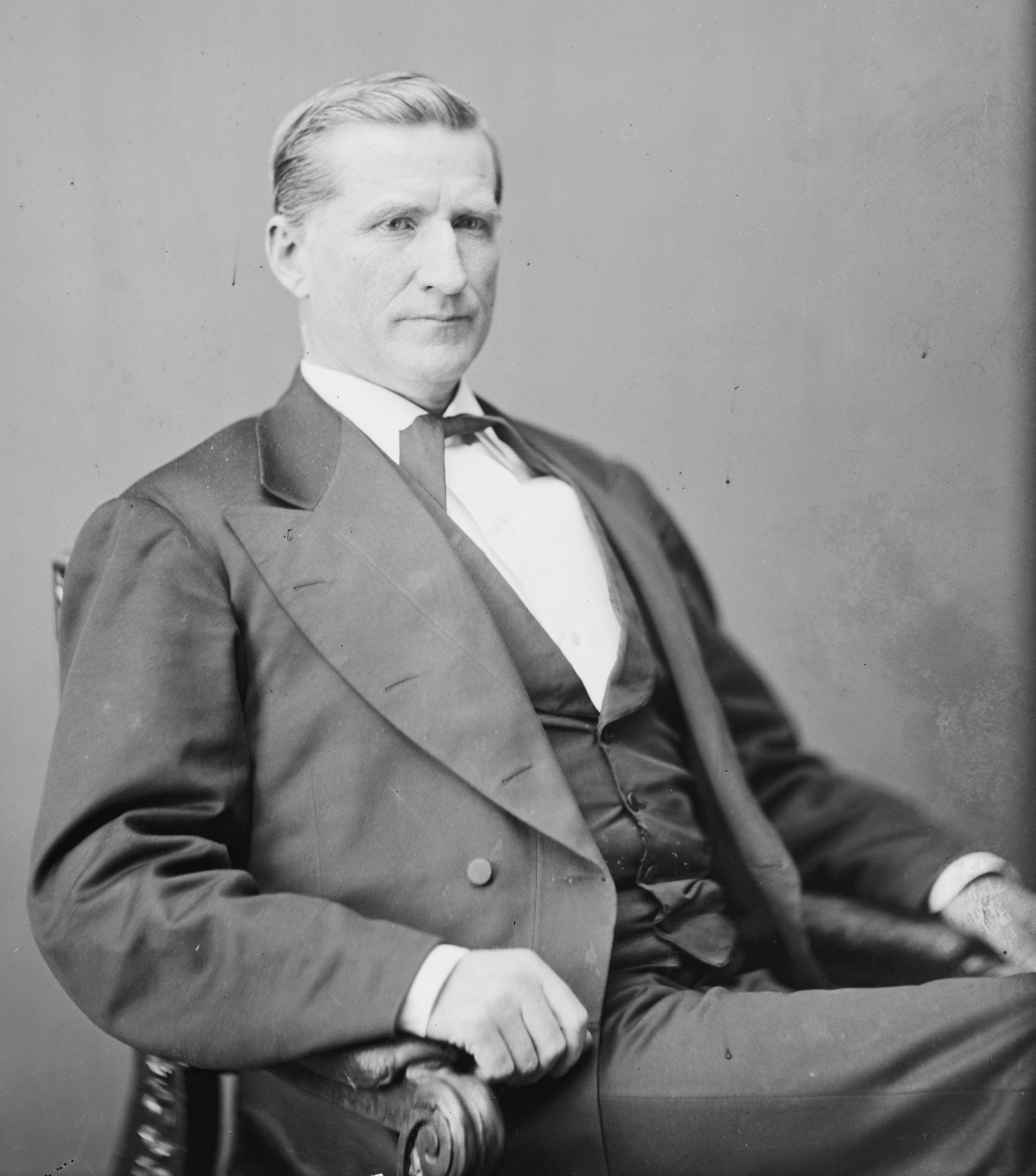
John Goode Jr.
Presiding officer

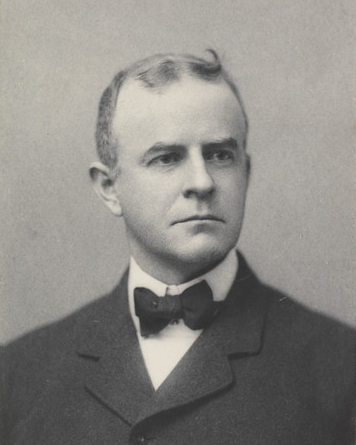
A. Caperton Braxton
Progressive

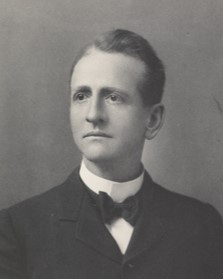
Carter Glass
newspaper editor

Walter Allen Watson of Nottoway County, was the sitting Commonwealth's Attorney and a member of the Martin machine's Democratic State Committee; he would later serve at a Virginia Circuit Court Judge. Watson held that the purpose of the Convention movement in Virginia as endorsed in popular referendum was "the elimination of the negro from the politics of this state." The majority of the Convention quickly followed his lead by adopting a two-stage restriction of the electorate. First, for one year, property qualifications were reinstated, this time allowing any male citizen paying one dollar in property tax to vote, along with any Civil War veteran, or the son of a veteran, blue or grey, white or black. The second step was imposition of a poll tax to be paid for three consecutive years annually prior to voting.

More controversial was the proposal for an "understanding" clause requiring each applicant to demonstrate an understanding of the Constitution to a county registrar. Alfred P. Thom, a railroad lawyer from Norfolk, explained "I would not expect an impartial administration of the clause." There would be no "friendship by the white man to the suffrage of the black man", but on the other hand, Thom did not expect a rigid examination for a white man, "this clause will not exclude any worthy white citizen of this Commonwealth from the suffrage…he will find a friendly examiner." Robert William Blair of Southwest Wythe County objected to the provisions proposed by Carter Glass which were the same methods used to bring disenfranchisement other Southern states. The understanding clause would give too much power to the "caprice and corruption of a dishonest election officer." In western Virginia, hundreds would be unable to meet the new requirements, without enough property, unable to pay the poll tax for three consecutive years, or who would fail the registrar's examination on Constitutional understanding.

== Outcomes ==
Capitol at Richmond VA, where the convention met

The Convention imposed a system of poll taxes along with literacy and understanding requirements to vote that had the effect of restricting the electorate. The outcome was almost immediate disenfranchising of blacks and half the previous number of whites voting. The Convention instituted a State Corporation Commission to regulate railroads, and it was upheld in the Virginia Supreme Court of Appeals. But it had no independence from the Martin political machine because the Governor appointed all three commissioners. Two years later the father of the State Corporation Commission became a corporate attorney for the Richmond, Fredericksburg and Potomac Railroad.

== Chart of delegates ==
The delegates to the Virginia Convention of June 12, 1901 to June 26, 1902 were elected the fourth Thursday in May, 1901. (One hundred members, from House of Delegates districts.)

Sortable table
Delegate	District	Proclamation
Otway S. Allen	Richmond City	against
George K. Anderson	Alleghany, Bath, Highland	against
W. A. Anderson	Rockbridge	against
Rufus A. Ayers	Buchanan, Dickensen, Wise	for
John S. Barbour	Culpeper	for
Joseph L. Barham	Southampton	for
Manly H. Barnes	New Kent, Charles City, James City, Warwick, York, Williamsburg, Newport News	against
Thomas H. Barnes	Nansemond	for
Robert W. Blair	Wythe	against
William H. Boaz	Albemarle, Charlottesville	for
D. W. Bolen	Carroll	against
Wood Bouldin	Halifax	for
Allen Caperton Braxton	Augusta, Staunton	for
Joseph A. Bristow	Essex and Middlesex	against
David Tucker Brooke	Norfolk City	against
John Thompson Brown	Bedford	for
William E. Cameron	Petersburg City	against
Clarence J. Campbell	Amherst	for
Preston W. Campbell	Washington	for
Hill Carter	Hanover	for
Hunter B. Chapman	Shenandoah	against
William L. Cobb	Caroline	for
H. F. Crismond	Spotsylvania, Fredericksburg	against
John Warwick Daniel	Campbell	against
B. A. Davis	Franklin	against
Wayland F. Dunaway	Lancaster, Richmond County	for
George N. Earman	Rockingham	against
David Q. Eggleston	Charlotte	for
Branch J. Epes	Dinwiddie	against
Henry Fairfax	Loudoun	for
Albert Fletcher	Loudoun, Fauquier	for
Henry D. Flood	Campbell, Appomattox	against
G. Taylor Garnett	Gloucester, Mathews	for
James W. Gilmore	Rockbridge	against
Albert P. Gillespie	Tazewell	against
Carter Glass	Lynchburg	not recorded
John Goode	Bedford	for
Bennett T. Gordon	Nelson	for
James Waddell Gordon	Richmond City	for
R. Lindsey Gordon	Louisa	for
Berryman Green	Pittsylvania, Danville	for
Roger Gregory	King William, Hanover	for
T. L. Gwyn	Grayson	against
Alexander Hamilton	Petersburg	against
Beverley A. Hancock	Chesterfield, Powhatan, Manchester	against
L. A. Hardy	Lunenburg	for
Thomas W. Harrison	Frederick, Winchester	against
Goodrich Hatton	Portsmouth	for
James M. Hooker	Patrick	against
E. W. Hubard	Buckingham, Cumberland	not recorded
Eppa Hunton Jr.	Fauquier	for
J. Henry Ingram	Chesterfield, Manchester, Powhatan	for
Clagget B. Jones	King and Queen	for
George W. Jones	Pittsylvania, Danville	for
George B. Keezell	Rockingham	against
Gilmer S. Kendall	Northampton, Accommac	for
John W. Lawson	Isle of Wight	for
Alanson T. Lincoln	Smyth, Bland	against
James H. Lindsay	Albemarle, Charlottesville	for
E. H. Lovell	Greene, Madison	for
James W. Marshall	Craig, Roanoke, Roanoke City	against
Richard McIlwaine	Prince Edward	for
Charles V. Meredith	Richmond	for
Charles E. Miller	Pittsylvania, Danville	for
Thomas Jefferson Moncure	Stafford, King George	against
Robert Walton Moore	Fairfax	against
Thomas Lee Moore	Fairfax	against
James Mundy	Botetourt	for
Virginius Newton	Richmond	resigned
Daniel C. O'Flaherty	Clarke, Warren	against
J.W. Orr	Lee	for
R. S. Parks	Page, Rappahannock	for
Abraham L. Pedigo	Henry	against
William B. Pettit	Fluvanna, Goochland	against
Nathan Phillips	Floyd	against
John Garland Pollard	Richmond	for
William Nathaniel Portlock	Norfolk	against
Julian Minor Quarles	Augusta, Staunton	for
James B. Richmond	Scott	for
Timothy Rives	Prince George, Surry	against
William Gordon Robertson	Roanoke City, Roanoke County, Craig	against
Francis Lee Smith	Alexandria City, Alexandria County	against
Joseph Stebbins	Halifax	for
Henry Carter Stuart	Russell	for
John C. Summers	Washington	against
George Patrick Tarry	Mecklenburg	for
Alfred P. Thom	Norfolk	against
James B. T. Thornton	Prince William	for
Robert Turnbull	Brunswick	for
Gordon L. Vincent	Greensville	not recorded
Samuel P. Waddill	Henrico	against
Cyrus Harding Walker	Northumberland, Westmoreland	for
A. C. Walter	Orange	for
Walter A. Watson	Nottoway, Amelia	against
Nathaniel B. Wescott	Accomac	for
J. M. Willis	Elizabeth City, Accomac	for
George Douglas Wise	Richmond	against
Eugene Withers	Danville, Pittsylania	for
Jonathan Woodhouse	Princess Anne	for
J. C. Wysor	Pulaski, Giles	against
W. T. Yancey	Rappahannock	for

== See also ==
- Virginia Conventions

== Bibliography ==
- Dabney, Virginius (1989). Virginia: the New Dominion, a history from 1607 to the present. University of Virginia Press. ISBN 9780813910154.
- Dinan, John (2014). The Virginia State Constitution: a reference guide. Oxford University Press. ISBN 9780199355747.
- Heinemann, Ronald L. (2008). Old Dominion, New Commonwealth: a history of Virginia, 1607-2007. University of Virginia Press. ISBN 978-0-8139-2769-5.
- Wallenstein, Peter (2007). Cradle of America: a history of Virginia. University Press of Kansas. ISBN 978-0-7006-1994-8.
