= M. D. Ball =

American politician (1835–1887)

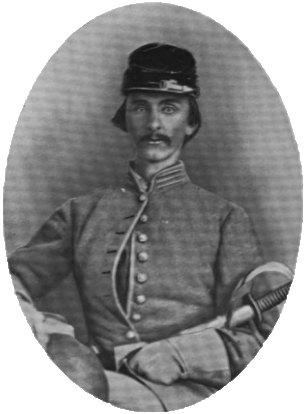

United States Attorney for the District of Alaska
- In office July 1885 – September 13, 1887
- President: Grover Cleveland
- Preceded by: Edward W. Haskett
- Succeeded by: Whitaker M. Grant

Member of the Virginia House of Delegates for Alexandria City and Alexandria
- In office December 6, 1876 – December 5, 1877
- Preceded by: William H. Fowle and George L. Simpson
- Succeeded by: George A. Mushbach

Personal details
- Born: Mottrom Dulany Ball; June 23, 1835 Falls Church, Virginia, U.S.
- Died: September 13, 1887 (aged 52) Sitka, Alaska, U.S.
- Resting place: Falls Church, Virginia, U.S.
- Party: Democratic; Republican
- Spouse: Sallie Lewis Wright (m. 1860)
- Education: College of William and Mary (BA, LLB)
- Occupation: Politician; lawyer; newspaper publisher

Military service
- Allegiance: Confederate States
- Branch/service: Confederate States Army
- Years of service: 1861–1865
- Rank: Lieutenant Colonel
- Unit: 5th Virginia Cavalry Regiment; 11th Virginia Cavalry Regiment
- Battles/wars: American Civil War

Mottrom Dulany Ball (Note: Also spelled Mottram, Motrom, Mottrone; sources differ greatly) (June 23, 1835 – September 13, 1887) was an American lawyer, newspaper publisher, Confederate Army officer and collector of customs for the United States Department of the Treasury. From March 27, 1878, to June 13, 1879, he was the highest-ranking federal official in the Department of Alaska, making him the de facto governor of the territory.

== Early life ==
Mottrom Dulany Ball was born in 1835 at Oak Mount in Falls Church, Fairfax County, Virginia, to Mary (née Dulany) and Spencer Mottrom Ball. Ball was educated at Episcopal High School in Alexandria. He graduated from the College of William and Mary with a Bachelor of Arts on July 4, 1854. He was a member of Theta Delta Chi. After serving in the Civil War, he graduated with a Bachelor of Laws from the College of William and Mary on July 4, 1867.

== Career ==
Ball served as lieutenant colonel of the 11th Virginia Cavalry Regiment in the Confederate States Army during the American Civil War.

Ball moved to Alexandria and practiced law with his uncle William Heath Dulany. For a time, he also practiced law in Baltimore. Around 1871, Ball became the editor of the Virginia Sentinel (also called the Standard and Sentinel) of Alexandria for about six years. He was also the owner.

Ball was a Democrat. In 1876, Ball was elected as an Independent, defeating H. W. Freebry, to serve as a member of the Virginia House of Delegates, representing Alexandria and Alexandria County. He later joined the Republican Party. President Rutherford B. Hayes appointed Ball as collector of customs for the Territory of Alaska on March 27, 1878. He served in that role officially until June 13, 1879. During this period, he was the highest ranking federal official in Alaska, and de facto governor. He continued to serve as collector of customs, but was not re-appointed by President James Garfield in July 1881, despite a petition from citizens in Sitka, Alaska.

On September 5, 1881, he won an election to be Alaska's first territorial delegate in the United States House of Representatives, but the United States House Committee on Elections did not recognize the results, and he was not seated. In November 1885, Ball founded the Alaskan, a newspaper in Sitka. He worked as the paper's first editor.

Ball was confirmed as district attorney of the Territory of Alaska on July 9, 1886, though some sources suggest he started the role in 1885. He served in that role until his death. He also ran a private law practice while district attorney in Alaska. In August 1887, he became a founding member of the Alaska Bar Association.

== Personal life ==
Ball married Sallie Lewis Wright on October 17, 1860. They had nine children, including Sallie L. and Mary.

Ball died on September 13, 1887, in Sitka while traveling from Alaska to Seattle on the steamer Ancon. He was buried in Falls Church.

== Legacy ==
Mottrom Drive in McLean, Virginia, is named for Ball.
