= Henry Fairfax (politician) =

American politician

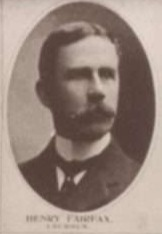
Photographic portrait of Henry Fairfax, taken for the Virginia Constitutional Convention1901–1902

Henry Fairfax (May 4, 1850 – July 11, 1916) was a Virginia horse breeder, planter and politician. He served as a member of Virginia Senate, a delegate to the Virginia Constitutional Convention of 1901–02, and as one of the first appointees to the Virginia State Corporation Commission.

== Political career ==
Fairfax entered politics in 1890, when he won election to represent Fauquier and Loudoun Counties in the Virginia Senate. He served in that position from 1891 to 1900, after which he was succeeded by George T. Ford. Fairfax next served as the Loudoun County delegate to the 1901 Constitutional Convention, where he joined the majority in supporting provisions that restricted the voting rights of black and poor white Virginians. In 1902, he was nominated and appointed to the newly created State Corporation Commission, where he served until 1905.
