= Charles Creighton Carlin =

American politician (1866–1938)

Charles C. Carlin
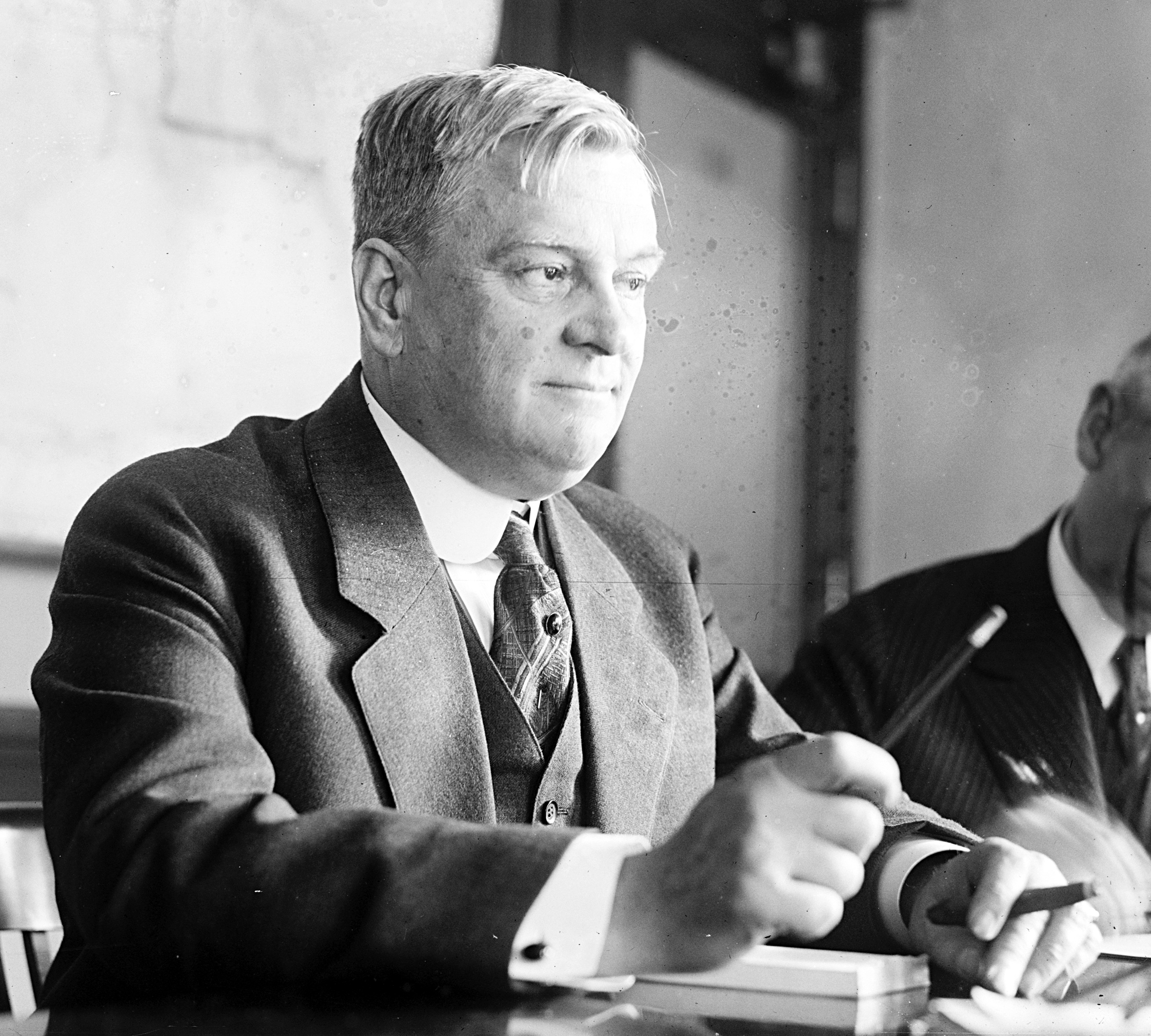
- Carlin in 1920

Member of the U.S. House of Representatives from Virginia's 8th district
- In office November 5, 1907 – March 3, 1919
- Preceded by: John Franklin Rixey
- Succeeded by: R. Walton Moore

Personal details
- Born: Charles Creighton Carlin; April 8, 1866 Alexandria, Virginia, U.S.
- Died: October 14, 1938 (aged 72) Washington, D.C., U.S.
- Resting place: Ivy Hill Cemetery
- Party: Democratic
- Spouse: Lilian E. Broders (m. 1891)
- Children: 2
- Education: National University Law School
- Occupation: Lawyer

Charles Creighton Carlin (April 8, 1866 – October 14, 1938) was an American lawyer, newspaper publisher and Democratic politician who served 6 terms in the United States House of Representatives representing Virginia's 8th congressional district from 1907 to 1919.

== Early and family life ==
Born in Alexandria, Virginia shortly after the American Civil War to railroad worker William Henry Carlin (1828–1870) and his wife Frances Elizabeth Eskridge (1826–1891), Carlin lost his father as a boy. However, his mother took in boarders and later worked as a teacher to support the family, and Charles was able to attended local public schools and Alexandria Academy. Seven of his mother's family had served in the Continental Army during the American Revolution, and one (lawyer George Eskridge) had served on the vestry of Alexandria's Christ Church and as the guardian of Mary Ball, who later became George Washington's mother. His parents had married in Fauquier County, Virginia in 1852, and William H. Carlin had served as a Confederate private in the 3rd Virginia Infantry. Before his early death, the young family also included daughters Mary (b. 1858) and Fannie (b. 1868) and another son Franklin (1862–1917) (son W. B. Carlin died as an infant in 1859).

Charles Carlin worked as a clerk (as did his elder brother Franklin) to support the family, and then attended the National University Law School, across the Potomac River in Washington, D.C. (now part of George Washington University School of Law).

=== Marriage and children ===
He married Lilian E. Broders (1867–1945) of Alexandria on October 28, 1891, and they had two sons: Charles Keith Carlin (1892–1965, who likewise became a lawyer after serving in the Army Air Force during both World Wars but moved to California) and Charles Creighton Carlin (1900–1966, who succeeded his father at the newspaper).

== Career ==
Carlin graduated from law school and was admitted to the Virginia bar in 1891 and began his legal practice in Alexandria.

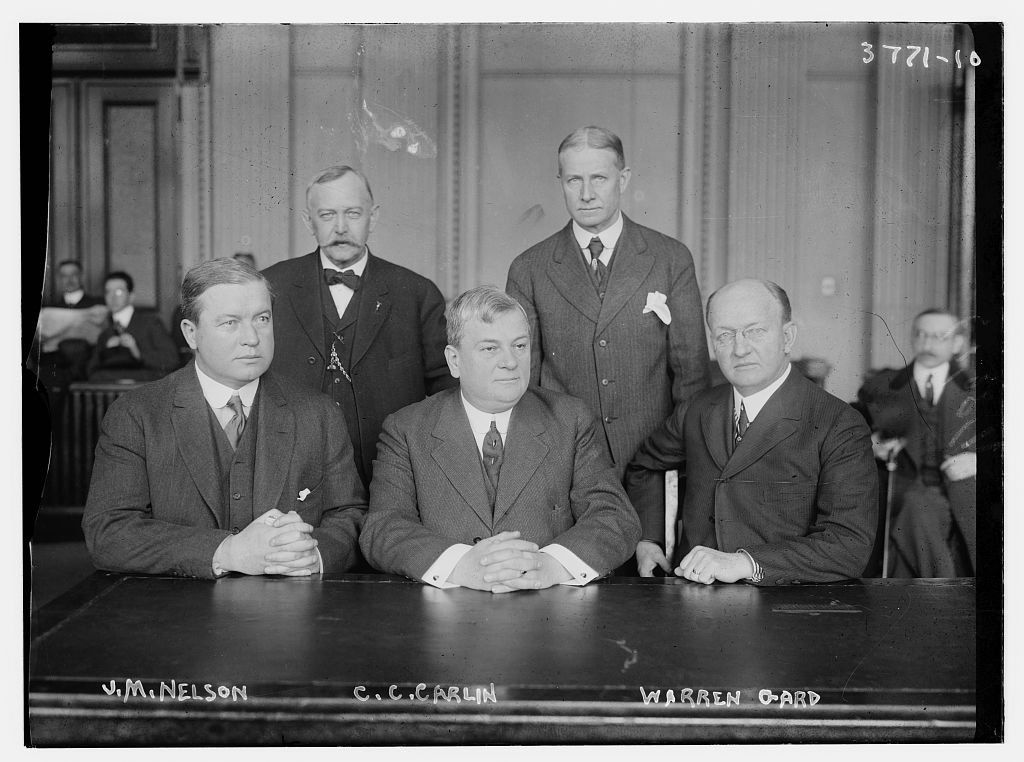
Charles Creighton Carlin on the House Committee on the Judiciary in 1916

=== Early political career ===
He was active in the local Democratic Party for over forty years, and ten times served as delegate to Democratic National Convention. He also served as Alexandria's postmaster from 1893 to 1897, during the administration of Democratic president Grover Cleveland. Carlin published the Alexandria Gazette newspaper in his home town, and in 1895 helped start the Celina Democrat in Celina, Mercer County, Ohio, which ceased publication in 1921.

=== Congress ===
With the support of Claude Swanson, Carlin was elected as a Democrat to the Sixtieth Congress to fill the vacancy caused by the unexpected death of John F. Rixey. He had faced a hotly contested Democratic primary, then handily defeated Republican Ernest Howard in the general election.

Carlin was re-elected to the Sixty-first and to five succeeding Congresses, serving from November 5, 1907, to March 3, 1919, when he resigned before the Sixty-sixth Congress, despite having been reelected without opposition. He had also faced no opponent in 1910, and had won lopsided victories in the contested elections: 79.68% of the vote against Republican J. W. Gregg in 1908, 90.7% of the vote against socialist F.T. Evans and independent Milton Fling in 1912, 75.3% of the vote against Republican Joseph L. Crupper, independent James E. Johnston and socialist Milton Fling in 1914, and 71.82% of the vote against Republican Joseph L. Crupper and independents Frank E. Manning and William H. Hamilton in 1916. In 1913, Carlin had succeeded in passing a bill to study creating a national park from the Manassas Battlefield, which his predecessor Rixey had introduced, but Congress failed to enact the appropriation the investigative committee recommended, due to the start of World War I.

Carlin was originally an opponent of women's suffrage, helping to keep the Nineteenth Amendment from leaving its subcommittee for years. However, by early 1920 he had changed his mind and saying, “I am now convinced that they [women] do want the right to vote...and am further convinced that they ought to have it.”

Fellow Democrat "Judge" Moore of Fairfax, Virginia succeeded Carlin in the U.S. House.

=== Later career ===
Carlin resigned from Congress in order to manage the unsuccessful presidential campaign of President Wilson's Attorney General (and former Pennsylvania Congressman) A. Mitchell Palmer for the 1920 Presidential nomination. He later managed the unsuccessful 1924 Presidential campaign of Alabama Senator Oscar Underwood (who lived in Alexandria and opposed the Ku Klux Klan). Carlin also testified before Congress in 1920 concerning Presidential campaign expenses.

Carlin also resumed his legal practice in Alexandria and Washington, D.C. Carlin moved to Washington, D.C. in 1936 and worked in both jurisdictions until his death.

== Death and legacy ==
Carlin died in Washington on October 14, 1938. Two wills were presented for probate, together with a revocation of one will and a trust document in favor of his granddaughter Sara (daughter of his son Charles C. Carlin Jr., who continued to publish the Alexandria Gazette). Despite an early settlement of the congressman's estate, a long legal battle later ensued over control of the newspaper, since another grandson (Keith) had become mentally ill while attending the University of California and had subsequently been confined to state mental hospitals in California and eventually Williamsburg, Virginia. Congressman Carlin's son, Major Charles Keith Carlin, and another grandson were later buried in Arlington National Cemetery, and the Alexandria Gazette continues to publish.

U.S. House of Representatives
Preceded by John F. Rixey	Member of the U.S. House of Representatives from Virginia's 8th congressional district 1907–1919	Succeeded by R. Walton Moore
