= George A. Mushbach =

American politician (1850–1901)

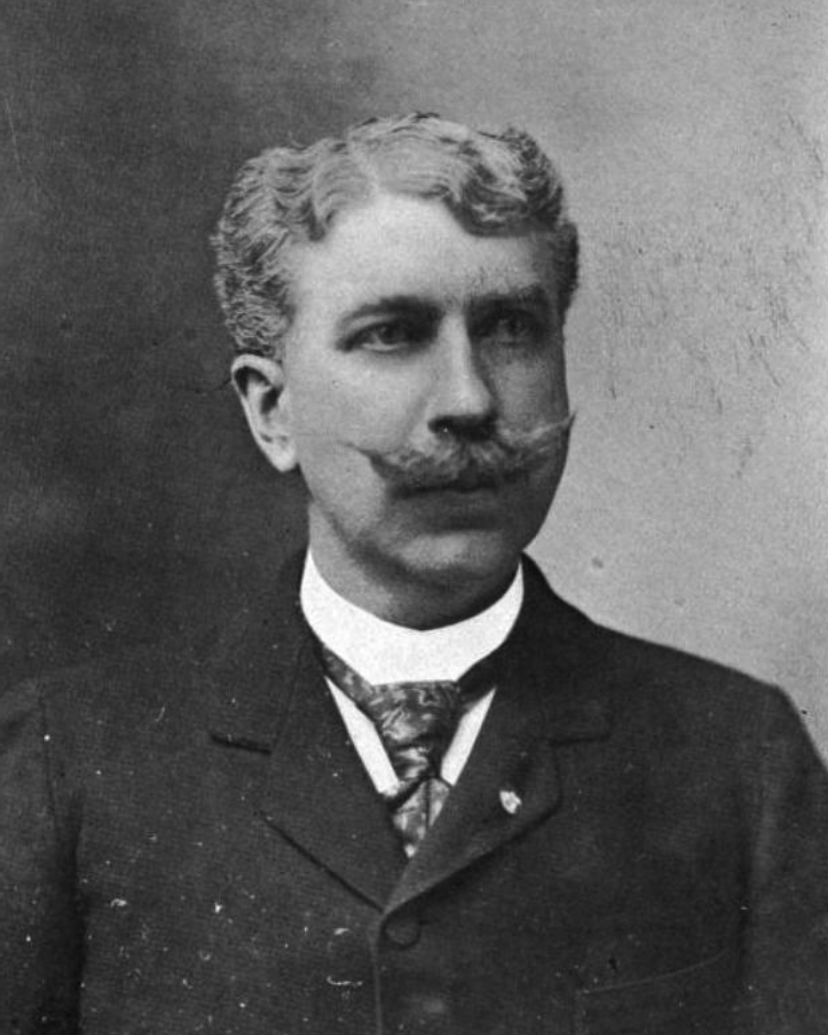
- Mushbach, c. 1901

Member of the Virginia Senate from the 14th district
- In office December 2, 1891 – December 6, 1899
- Preceded by: R. Walton Moore
- Succeeded by: Stephen R. Donohoe

Member of the Virginia House of Delegates for Alexandria City and Alexandria
- In office December 5, 1877 – December 7, 1881
- Preceded by: M. D. Ball
- Succeeded by: Charles E. Stuart

Personal details
- Born: George Augustus Mushbach; January 6, 1850 Hamburg, New Jersey, U.S.
- Died: December 27, 1901 (aged 51) Alexandria, Virginia, U.S.
- Party: Democratic
- Spouse: Eva B. Gwynn (m. 1886)
- Relatives: Joseph E. Edsall (grandfather)
- Education: Rutgers College

George Augustus Mushbach (January 6, 1850 – December 27, 1901) was an American lawyer and politician who served in the Virginia House of Delegates representing Alexandria and Alexandria County. He also served in the Virginia Senate, representing Alexandria, Fairfax County and Prince William County, from 1891 to 1898.

== Early life ==
George Augustus Mushback was born in January 1850, in Sussex County, New Jersey. He was the grandson of Joseph E. Edsall, a senator from New Jersey. He attended Rutgers College. He was related to U.S. Army general Heintzleman. He studied law in the office of Francis L. Smith. He was admitted to the bar in Virginia.

== Career ==
Mushbach had a law practice with M. D. Ball. He later had a practice with C. W. Wattles. After Wattles died, he practiced law alone.

Mushbach was a Democrat. In the 1870s, Mushbach served as a member of the city council of Alexandria. Mushbach served as a member of the Virginia House of Delegates, representing Alexandria and Alexandria County from 1877 to 1881. He then served in the Virginia Senate, representing the 14th district, including Alexandria, Fairfax County and Prince William County, 1891 to 1899.

Mushbach was elected as captain of the Alexandria Light Infantry in 1882 or 1883. He served as captain for ten years.

== Personal life ==
Mushbach married Eva B. Gwynn, daughter of Bennett F. Gwynn, in December 1886. He lived at North Washington Street in Alexandria.

Mushbach died on December 27, 1901, at his home in Alexandria.
