= SS Johan Printz =

World War II Liberty ship of the United States

History

United States
- Name: Johan Printz
- Namesake: Johan Printz
- Ordered: as type (EC2-S-C1) hull, MC hull 2375
- Builder: J.A. Jones Construction, Brunswick, Georgia
- Cost: $1,026,749
- Yard number: 160
- Way number: 2
- Laid down: 7 August 1944
- Launched: 18 September 1944
- Sponsored by: Mrs. Glenn Fite
- Completed: 29 September 1944
- Identification: Call Signal: KSMZ
- Fate: Laid up in National Defense Reserve Fleet, Wilmington, North Carolina, 24 October 1947; Laid up in National Defense Reserve Fleet, James River Group, Lee Hall, Virginia, 25 March 1958; Sold for scrapping, 10 July 1970

General characteristics
- Class & type: Liberty ship; type EC2-S-C1, standard
- Tonnage: 10,865 LT DWT; 7,176 GRT
- Displacement: 3,380 long tons (3,434 t) (light); 14,245 long tons (14,474 t) (max)
- Length: 441 feet 6 inches (135 m) oa; 416 feet (127 m) pp; 427 feet (130 m) lwl
- Beam: 57 feet (17 m)
- Draft: 27 ft 9.25 in (8.4646 m)
- Installed power: 2 × Oil fired 450 °F (232 °C) boilers, operating at 220 psi (1,500 kPa); 2,500 hp (1,900 kW)
- Propulsion: 1 × triple-expansion steam engine, (manufactured by General Machinery Corp., Hamilton, Ohio); 1 × screw propeller
- Speed: 11.5 knots (21.3 km/h; 13.2 mph)
- Capacity: 562,608 cubic feet (15,931 m^{3}) (grain); 499,573 cubic feet (14,146 m^{3}) (bale)
- Complement: 38–62 USMM; 21–40 USNAG
- Armament: Varied by ship; Bow-mounted 3-inch (76 mm)/50-caliber gun; Stern-mounted 4-inch (102 mm)/50-caliber gun; 2–8 × single 20-millimeter (0.79 in) Oerlikon anti-aircraft (AA) cannons and/or, 2–8 × 37-millimeter (1.46 in) M1 AA guns

SS Johan Printz was a Liberty ship built in the United States during World War II. She was named after Johan Printz, the governor from 1643 until 1653, of the Swedish colony of New Sweden, in North America.

== Construction ==
Johan Printz was laid down on 7 August 1944, under a United States Maritime Commission (MARCOM) contract, MC hull 2375, by J.A. Jones Construction, Brunswick, Georgia; she was sponsored by Mrs. Glenn Fite, and launched on 18 September 1944.

== History ==
She was allocated to the Parry Navigation Company, on 29 September 1944. On 24 October 1947, she was laid up in the National Defense Reserve Fleet in Wilmington, North Carolina. On 25 March 1958, she was laid up in the National Defense Reserve Fleet in the James River Group, Lee Hall, Virginia. On 10 July 1970, she was sold for $40,300, to Northern Metal Company, for scrapping. She was removed from the fleet on 28 July 1970.

== Bibliography ==
- "Jones Construction, Brunswick GA". ShipbuildingHistory.com. 13 October 2010.
- "Liberty Ships – World War II".
- Maritime Administration. "Johan Printz". Ship History Database Vessel Status Card. U.S. Department of Transportation, Maritime Administration. Archived from the original on 12 December 2019.
- Davies, James (May 2004). "Specifications (As-Built)" (PDF). p. 23.
- "SS Johan Printz".
