= SS R. Walton Moore =

WWII Liberty Ship

History

United States
- Name: R. Walton Moore
- Namesake: R. Walton Moore
- Ordered: as type (EC2-S-C1) hull, MC hull 2370
- Builder: J.A. Jones Construction, Brunswick, Georgia
- Cost: $1,009,493
- Yard number: 155
- Way number: 3
- Laid down: 1 July 1944
- Launched: 14 August 1944
- Sponsored by: Mrs. Charles P. Howze
- Completed: 26 August 1944
- Identification: Call Signal: WSUU
- Fate: Laid up in National Defense Reserve Fleet, Susisun Bay Group, 2 November 1948; Laid up in National Defense Reserve Fleet, Olympia, Washington, 15 June 1955; Sold for scrapping, 6 February 1961

General characteristics
- Class & type: Liberty ship; type EC2-S-C1, standard
- Tonnage: 10,865 LT DWT; 7,176 GRT
- Displacement: 3,380 long tons (3,434 t) (light); 14,245 long tons (14,474 t) (max)
- Length: 441 feet 6 inches (135 m) oa; 416 feet (127 m) pp; 427 feet (130 m) lwl
- Beam: 57 feet (17 m)
- Draft: 27 ft 9.25 in (8.4646 m)
- Installed power: 2 × Oil fired 450 °F (232 °C) boilers, operating at 220 psi (1,500 kPa); 2,500 hp (1,900 kW)
- Propulsion: 1 × triple-expansion steam engine, (manufactured by General Machinery Corp., Hamilton, Ohio); 1 × screw propeller
- Speed: 11.5 knots (21.3 km/h; 13.2 mph)
- Capacity: 562,608 cubic feet (15,931 m^{3}) (grain); 499,573 cubic feet (14,146 m^{3}) (bale)
- Complement: 38–62 USMM; 21–40 USNAG
- Armament: Varied by ship; Bow-mounted 3-inch (76 mm)/50-caliber gun; Stern-mounted 4-inch (102 mm)/50-caliber gun; 2–8 × single 20-millimeter (0.79 in) Oerlikon anti-aircraft (AA) cannons and/or, 2–8 × 37-millimeter (1.46 in) M1 AA guns

SS R. Walton Moore was a Liberty ship built in the United States during World War II. She was named after R. Walton Moore, a member of the Virginia Senate and United States Representative from Virginia.

== Construction ==
R. Walton Moore was laid down on 1 July 1944, under a United States Maritime Commission (MARCOM) contract, MC hull 2370, by J.A. Jones Construction, Brunswick, Georgia; she was sponsored by Mrs. Charles P. Howze, and launched on 14 August 1944.

== History ==
She was allocated to Parry Navigation Co., on 26 August 1944. On 2 November 1948, she was laid up in the National Defense Reserve Fleet in the Suisun Bay Group. On 5 June 1955, she was withdrawn from the fleet to be loaded with grain under the "Grain Program 1955", she relocated to the Olympia Group, loaded with grain on 15 June 1955. She was withdrawn from the fleet on 12 January 1958, to have the grain unloaded and returned empty on 19 January 1958. On 6 February 1961, she was sold for scrapping to Zidell Exploration, Inc., for $56,333.41. She was removed from the fleet on 23 May 1961.

== Bibliography ==
- "Jones Construction, Brunswick GA". ShipbuildingHistory.com. 13 October 2010.
- "Liberty Ships – World War II".
- Maritime Administration. "R. Walton Moore". Ship History Database Vessel Status Card. U.S. Department of Transportation, Maritime Administration. Archived from the original on 12 December 2019.
- Davies, James (May 2004). "Specifications (As-Built)" (PDF). p. 23.
- "SS R. Walton Moore".
