= Alfred P. Thom =

American politician

Alfred Pembroke Thom (15 December 1854 – 1935) was a railroad lawyer, a civic leader of Norfolk, Virginia, a delegate to the Virginia Constitutional Convention of 1901, and a president of The Virginia Bar Association.

== Biography ==
Thom was born to prominent Virginia Dr. William Taylor Thom (1820-1894) in 1854. He had a brother, W T Thom II and a sister, Marion E. Thom.

Thom graduated from the University of Virginia and began practicing law in 1876. In 1878 Thom fought a duel. He was wounded; his opponent, Major Sidney Pitts, was killed.

On 20 September 1881 Thom married Virginia W. Tunstell, the widow of Robert P. Baylor. After she died Thom married Jessie G. Thom.

== Legal career ==
In 1883 Thom formed a law partnership in Norfolk with his brother-in-law, Richard B. Tunstall. Thom and Tunstall were among the founding directors of the Norfolk Company, which developed what is now the Ghent Historic District. One of the streets in Ghent is named after Thom.

In 1901 Thom represented Norfolk at the Virginia Constitutional Convention. He created a sensation in the early stages of the Convention by proposing that the delegates should begin by taking the oath from the Underwood Constitution of 1870, which the Convention was assembled to amend. Thom's proposal was voted down, 69-14. Commenting on the legality of the Convention's purposes, Thom said: "We come here to sweep the field of expedients for the purpose of finding some constitutional method of ridding ourselves of [black enfranchisement] forever; and we have the approval of the Supreme Court of the United States in making that effort."

Thom was one of the founders in 1898 and the first president of the Norfolk and Portsmouth Bar Association. Thom also served as president of The Virginia Bar Association in 1904-1905. In 1913 Washington and Lee University conferred on Thom an honorary doctor of laws degree.

Thom was Virginia counsel to the Southern Railway, and later relocated to Washington, D.C., as he became general counsel to the Association of Railway Executives, which made him a spokesman for railroad interests before Congress and in the national press during and after World War I.
