= W. H. F. Lee =

Confederate general (1837–1891)

William Henry Fitzhugh Lee
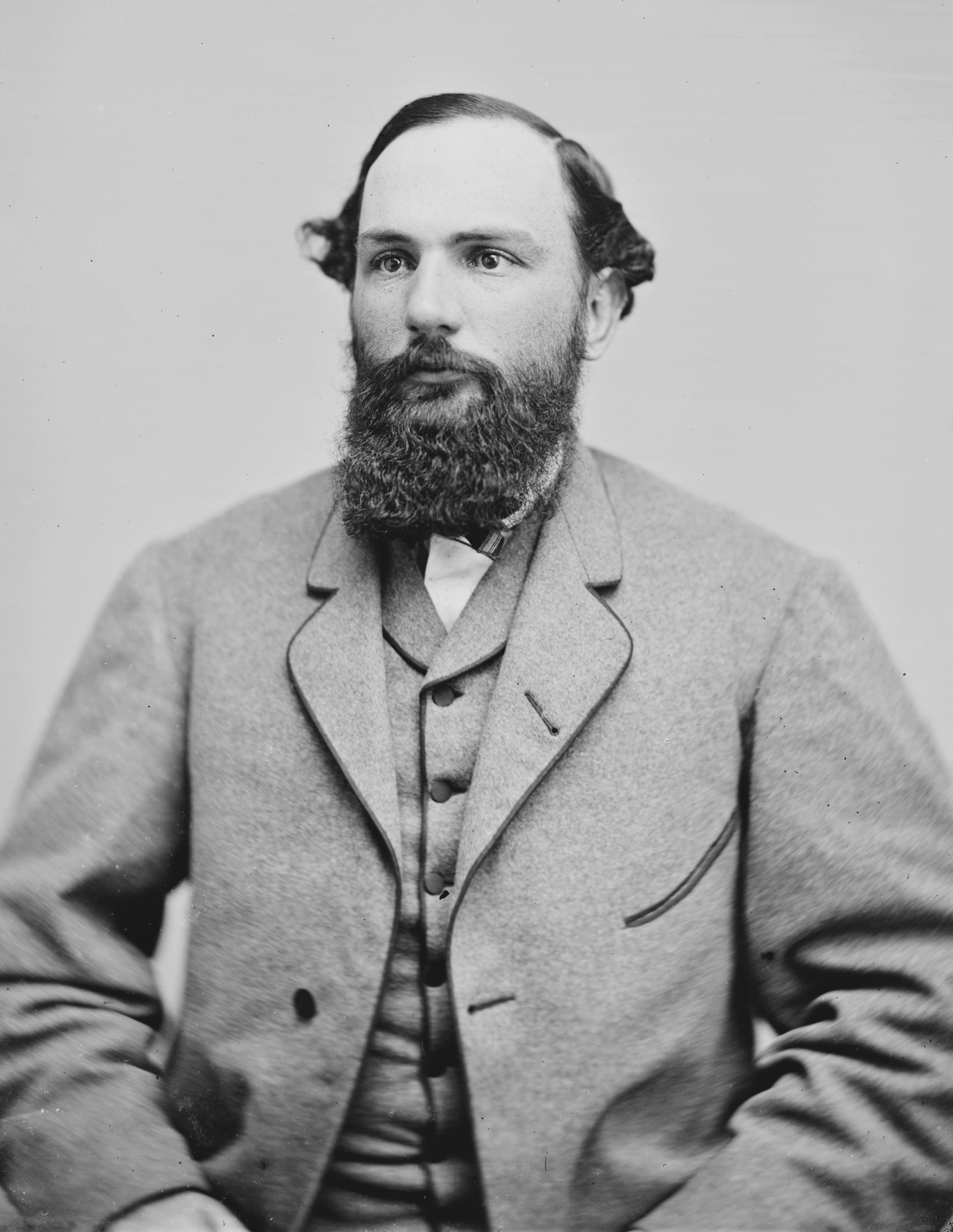

Member of the U.S. House of Representatives from Virginia's 8th district
- In office March 4, 1887 – October 15, 1891
- Preceded by: John S. Barbour Jr.
- Succeeded by: Elisha E. Meredith

Member of the Virginia Senate for Loudoun, Alexandria, Fairfax, and Prince William
- In office December 6, 1876 – December 3, 1879
- Preceded by: Hierome O. Claughton
- Succeeded by: Francis L. Smith

Personal details
- Born: May 31, 1837 Arlington House, Virginia, U.S.
- Died: October 15, 1891 (aged 54) Alexandria, Virginia, U.S.
- Resting place: University Chapel
- Spouses: Charlotte Wickham (m. 1859; died 1863) Mary Tabb Bolling (m. 1867)
- Children: Robert; Charlotte; Robert III; George
- Parent(s): Robert E. Lee (father); Mary Anna Custis (mother)
- Education: Harvard University

Military service
- Allegiance: United States; Confederate States
- Branch/service: United States Army; Confederate States Army
- Years of service: 1857–1859 (USA); 1861–1865 (CSA)
- Rank: Second Lieutenant (USA); Major General (CSA)
- Commands: 9th Virginia Cavalry
- Battles/wars: American Civil War

William Henry Fitzhugh Lee (May 31, 1837 – October 15, 1891), known as Rooney Lee (often spelled "Roony" among friends and family) or W. H. F. Lee, was the second son of General Robert E. Lee, of the Lee Family of Virginia, and Mary Anna Custis. He was a planter, a Confederate cavalry general in the American Civil War, and later a Democratic Congressman from Virginia.

== Early life ==
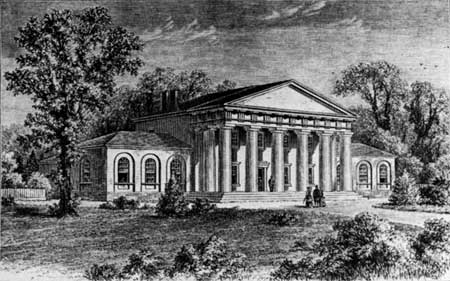
Arlington House, Lee's birthplace

Lee was born at Arlington House in Arlington, Virginia, and named for William Henry Fitzhugh (d. 1830), his mother's uncle. At an early age, his father began to call him Rooney; what prompted him to use this nickname is not known, but it stuck as a way to differentiate him from his cousin Fitzhugh Lee.

=== Harvard ===
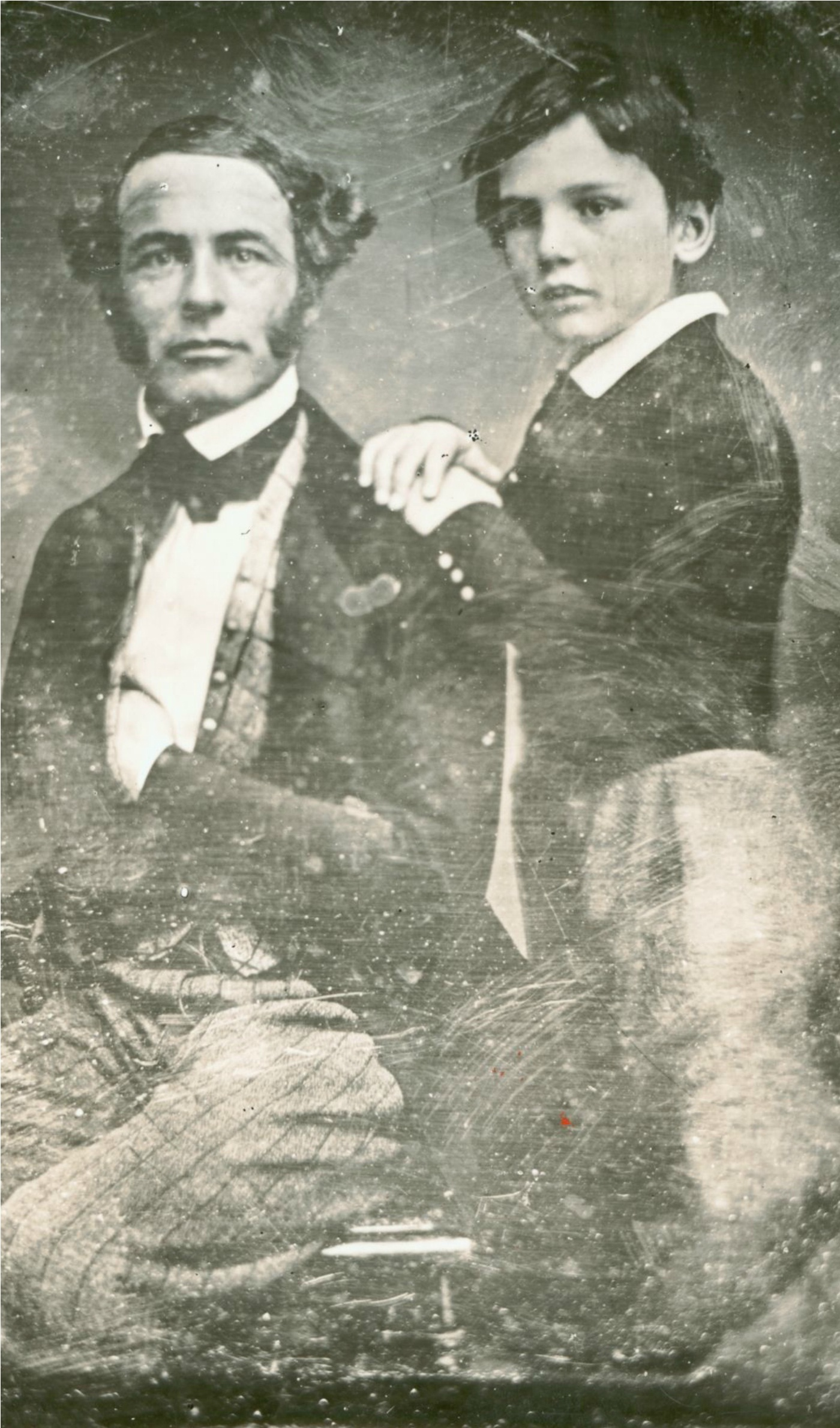
Rooney Lee, about 8 years old, with his father Robert E. Lee

Lee aspired to follow his father and older brother George Washington Custis Lee, to attend the United States Military Academy. However, probably because of an unofficial policy of not concurrently enrolling members of the same family, he was unable to, and in 1854 enrolled at Harvard College. Lee was a big and athletic young man, standing 6 ft 3 in (1.91 m), weighing about 220 pounds (100 kg), and was on Harvard's rowing team. However, he was less successful academically. Henry Adams, a classmate of Rooney Lee at Harvard College, described him thus: "Tall, largely built, handsome, genial, with liberal Virginian openness towards all he liked, he had also the Virginian habit of command and took leadership as his natural habit. No one cared to contest it. None of the New Englanders wanted command. For a year, at least, Lee was the most popular and prominent young man in his class, but then seemed slowly to drop into the background. The habit of command was not enough, and the Virginian had little else. He was simple beyond analysis; so simple that even the simple New England student could not realize him. No one knew enough to know how ignorant he was; how childlike; how helpless before the relative complexity of a school."

=== Early military career ===
A failure at Harvard, he dropped out in 1857 and "gladly seized the chance of escape by accepting a commission offered him by General Winfield Scott in the force then being organised against the Mormons. He asked Adams to write his letter of acceptance." He entered the United States Army in 1857 as a second lieutenant. He served with the 6th U.S. Infantry under Albert Sidney Johnston, and participated in the Utah War against the Mormons.

=== Planter ===
In 1859, Lee resigned from the U.S. Army to operate his White House Plantation, on the south shore of the Pamunkey River, in New Kent County, Virginia.

== Civil War ==
With the outbreak of the Civil War, Lee was commissioned as a captain in the Confederate Army cavalry and was soon promoted to major. He initially served as a cavalry commander for Brig. Gen. William Loring in the mountains of western Virginia during his father's Western Virginia Campaign. Loring's forces were transferred to the lower Shenandoah Valley and the command of Stonewall Jackson in late 1861 and occupied the town of Romney in early 1862. Lee was soon after assigned to the command of Maj. Gen. J.E.B. Stuart, who was leading the cavalry forces for Joseph E. Johnston's Army of Northern Virginia, in the Peninsula Campaign. After joining Stuart, Rooney Lee's regiment participated in Stuart's first ride around the Union army, as well as the subsequent Seven Days Battles around Richmond. During this time, Rooney's nearby White House plantation was burned to the ground, and his son Robert died of typhoid fever.

During the Northern Virginia Campaign, Rooney played a leading role in Stuart's well-crafted attack on General John Pope's supply base at Catlett's Station on August 22, 1862, capturing a paymaster's safe full of Yankee greenbacks. His cavalry regiment was assigned to the brigade of Brig. Gen. Fitzhugh Lee, his cousin, for the Maryland Campaign. Following the Battle of South Mountain, Lee was knocked unconscious after a horse fell from under him, and was unable to participate in the Battle of Antietam. Upon his recovery, he temporarily commanded Fitzhugh Lee's cavalry brigade in Stuart's Chambersburg Raid, his conduct earning him promotion to brigadier general. He then commanded the 3rd Brigade of Stuart's Cavalry Division at the Battles of Fredericksburg mere weeks after the death of his infant daughter. Lee's brigade would play a role in the December 27–29, 1862 Christmas Raids of Union supply depots in Virginia. During the Battle of Chancellorsville the following year, Lee was detached from Stuart's cavalry to defend against Stoneman's 1863 Raid.

At the beginning of the Gettysburg campaign, Lee was shot in the thigh during combat at Brandy Station. He spent the next two weeks recovering at Hickory Hill, Virginia, before being captured by Union forces. As a prisoner of war, he was sent to Fort Monroe for several months, before being shipped to New York, where he was held until returned to the Confederate Army on February 25, 1864, in exchange for Union Brig. Gen. Neal S. Dow.

In April 1864, Lee was promoted to major general and commanded a division in the Cavalry Corps during the battles of The Wilderness, Todd's Tavern, Spotsylvania Court House, and North Anna in the Overland Campaign. With the death of Jeb Stuart, Rooney Lee's role increased. Lee's cavalry division patrolled the extreme right of the Confederate lines during the Siege of Petersburg, defending against the Wilson-Kautz Raid at Staunton River Bridge, Sappony Church and First Ream's Station. His division was then sent north to briefly aid in the defense of Richmond at the Second Battle of Deep Bottom, before supporting General Wade Hampton III's Beefsteak Raid, and then returning to Petersburg for the Battle of Boydton Plank Road.

By the last year of the war, Rooney Lee had risen to second-in-command of the Confederate cavalry in Virginia, General Hampton having been transferred to South Carolina to raise troops, and Lee's cousin, Fitzhugh, promoted to overall command. Lee's cavalry division screened the Confederate evacuation of Petersburg, notably at the Battle of Namozine Church during the Appomattox Campaign. He surrendered along with his father at Appomattox Court House with only 300 officers and men, one-tenth the size of the command during the Petersburg Campaign.

== Postbellum career ==
Lee returned to White House Plantation and planting after the war. Nearby, his younger brother Rob lived at Romancoke Plantation across the river in King William County.

After their mother died in 1873, Rooney inherited Ravensworth Plantation, the old Fitzhugh family property (near present-day Springfield) in Fairfax County with 563 acres (2.28 km^{2}) of land. He moved there with his family from White House.

In 1875 Rooney was elected to the Virginia Senate, serving until 1878. He was elected as a Democrat to the United States House of Representatives in 1887. On July 7, 1890, Lee became a charter member of the newly formed Virginia Society of the Sons of the American Revolution and was appointed its first Vice President, reflecting both his public standing and his descent from multiple Revolutionary‑era patriot families. He served in the House until his death of a heart attack at Ravensworth in 1891. He is interred in the University Chapel at Washington and Lee University in Lexington, Virginia, with his parents and siblings.

== Marriage and family ==
Lee married twice, first in 1859 to Charlotte Georgiana Wickham, daughter of George and Charlotte Carter Wickham and a descendant of the attorney John Wickham and his wife. They had two children, Robert Edward Lee (March 11, 1860 – June 30, 1862) and Charlotte Carter Lee (October 19, 1862 – December 6, 1862). Charlotte Georgiana Wickham Lee died December 26, 1863.

On November 28, 1867, he married Mary Tabb Bolling. They had two sons, who both lived to adulthood: Robert Edward Lee III (February 11, 1869, at Petersburg – September 7, 1922, at Roanoke, VA) and George Bolling Lee (August 30, 1872 at Lexington – July 13, 1948, at New York, NY).

Lee's mother, Mary Anna Randolph Custis, was the only surviving child of George Washington Parke Custis and Mary Lee Fitzhugh. George was the grandson of Martha Dandridge and step-grandson of President George Washington.

Lee was also a descendant of Charles II of England through Lady Charlotte Lee (granddaughter of Barbara Villiers), who married the 4th Baron Baltimore, and possibly, a descendant of George I, through Benedict Swingate Calvert (grandson of Lady Charlotte Lee), the illegitimate son of 5th Baron Baltimore and of an unknown mother, who was supposed to be Melusina von der Schulenburg, illegitimate daughter of the King.

Ancestors of W. H. F. Lee

8. Henry Lee II
4. Henry Lee III
9. Lucy Grymes
2. Robert E. Lee
10. Charles Hill Carter
5. Anne Hill Carter
11. Ann Butler Moore
1. William Henry Fitzhugh Lee
12. John Parke Custis
6. George Washington Parke Custis
13. Eleanor Calvert
3. Mary Anna Randolph Custis
14. William Fitzhugh
7. Mary Lee Fitzhugh
15. Anne Randolph

== See also ==
- List of American Civil War generals (Confederate)
- List of members of the United States Congress who died in office (1790–1899)

U.S. House of Representatives
Preceded by John S. Barbour, Jr.	Member of the U.S. House of Representatives from Virginia's 8th congressional district 1887–1891	Succeeded by Elisha E. Meredith
