= Parry Navigation Company =

Former US Shipping Company

- Industry: Shipping
- Founded: 1942 in New York City, United States
- Key people: Alfred Walter Parry Jr.; Charles W. Perkes

Parry Navigation Company was a shipping company founded in 1942 by Alfred Walter Parry Jr. in New York City. Alfred Walter Parry Jr. first career was ship broker with Smith & Terry Inc. in New York City. He was also the office manager of the Interocean Steamship Company of New York in New Orleans. Smith & Terry Inc also were managing agents for the some United States Shipping Board ships. Alfred Walter Parry Jr. father, Alfred Walter Parry Sr., was an agent for a railroad company. Parry Navigation Company operated ships for the World War II. Alfred Walter Parry Jr. became a Colonel in the United States Army. Parry served with the US Army Transportation Corps in the South Pacific Ocean. Parry Navigation Company expanded the company and opened an office in San Francisco in 1945. Parry Navigation Company stated the Parry Line in 1947 and expanded with route to Galveston, Texas. The Parry Line had routes from the West Coast of the United States to Manila, Shanghai, Hong Kong and North China. Parry was the vice president for the Lykes Brothers Steamship Company for a few years. Parry was awarded the Legion of Merit and World War II Victory Medal for his service in the US Army Transportation Corps. Charles W. Perkes was a manager in Parry Navigation Company. Perkes, before Parry worked for the Dollar Line.

== World War II ==
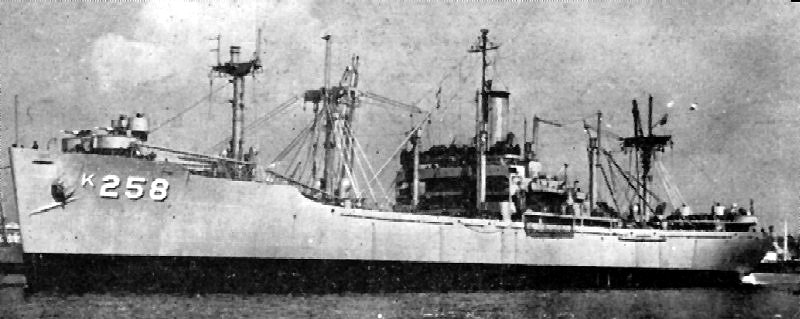
A Victory ship of World War II

Liberty ship of World War II

Parry Navigation Company fleet of ships were used to help the World War II effort. During World War II Parry Navigation Company operated Merchant navy ships for the United States Shipping Board. During World War II Parry Navigation Company was active with charter shipping with the Maritime Commission and War Shipping Administration. Parry Navigation Company operated Liberty ships and Victory ships for the merchant navy. The ship was run by its Parry Navigation Company crew and the US Navy supplied United States Navy Armed Guards to man the deck guns and radio.

== Ships ==
=== Liberty ships operated ===
- SS R. Walton Moore
- SS Royal S. Copeland
- SS Johan Printz
- John H. Eaton
- Mary Pickersgill
- Clark Howell
- L. H. McNelly
- SS Harold A. Jordan
- SS William P. Duval

=== Victory ships operated ===
- Laconia Victory
- Newberry Victory
- SS Boulder Victory

== See also ==
- World War II United States Merchant Navy
