= Lewis H. Machen =

American politician and lawyer

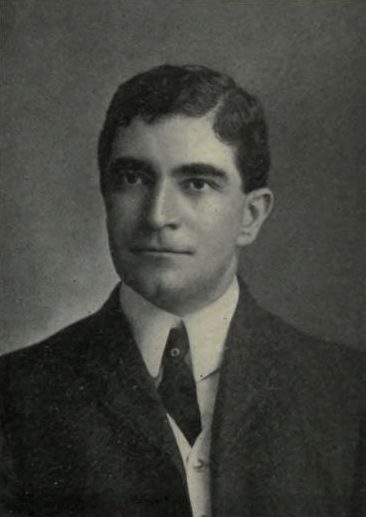
- Machen in 1904 publication

Member of the Virginia Senate from the 14th district
- In office January 13, 1904 – January 8, 1908
- Preceded by: Stephen R. Donohoe
- Succeeded by: R. Ewell Thornton

Personal details
- Born: Lewis Henry Machen; July 10, 1871 near Centreville, Virginia, U.S.
- Died: September 14, 1927 (aged 56) Richmond, Virginia, U.S.
- Resting place: Episcopal Church; Centreville, Virginia, U.S.
- Party: Democratic
- Spouse: Adine McGowan
- Children: 1
- Education: Columbian University (LLB)
- Occupation: Politician; lawyer

Lewis Henry Machen (July 10, 1871 – September 14, 1927) was an American politician and lawyer from Virginia. He served as a member of the Virginia Senate.

== Early life ==
Lewis H. Machen was born on July 10, 1871, near Centreville, Fairfax County, Virginia, to Georgie (née Chichester) and James P. Machen. Machen was named after his grandfather Lewis H. Machen, a clerk of the U.S. Senate and rescuer of records during the burning of Washington, D.C. in 1814. His uncle was Arthur W. Machen, a lawyer in Baltimore. He studied at local schools, Orange Academy, the Locust Dale Academy in Madison County and the Episcopal High School near Alexandria. He entered the University of Virginia in 1891 and studied there two years, one year studying law. He received orator's and debater's medal from the Jefferson Society at the University of Virginia. He was assistant editor of the Corks and Curls publication and editor-in-chief of College Topics and the University Magazine at the University of Virginia. He served as president of the Democratic Club at the school in 1892.

After leaving the University of Virginia, Machen taught one year at the Episcopal High School in Alexandria. He also spent a year working at a newspaper in Washington, D.C. Machen graduated from the Columbian University in 1897 with a Bachelor of Laws.

== Career ==
After graduating with his law degree, Machen practiced law at the Fairfax Court House. He was associated with the law firm Machen & Moncure. He moved to Alexandria in 1902.

Machen served as a presidential elector in 1900, representing Virginia's 8th congressional district. He represented 14th district in the Virginia Senate. He also ran for lieutenant governor of Virginia.

Machen served as assistant attorney general of Virginia until his death in 1927. After his death, he was succeeded by Edwin H. Gibson.

== Personal life ==
Machen married Adine McGowan. They had one son.

Machen died from a heart attack on September 14, 1927, at his apartment in Richmond. He was buried at the Episcopal Church in Centreville.
