= SS Harold A. Jordan =

Liberty ship of WWII

History

United States
- Name: Harold A. Jordan
- Namesake: Harold A. Jordan
- Owner: War Shipping Administration (WSA)
- Operator: Parry Navigation Co.
- Ordered: as type (EC2-S-C1) hull, MC hull 2514
- Awarded: 23 April 1943
- Builder: St. Johns River Shipbuilding Company, Jacksonville, Florida
- Cost: $995,807
- Yard number: 78
- Way number: 6
- Laid down: 30 November 1944
- Launched: 6 January 1945
- Sponsored by: Mrs. William H. Jordan
- Completed: 17 January 1945
- Identification: Call sign: ANFG
- Fate: Laid up in the National Defense Reserve Fleet, Wilmington, North Carolina, 4 March 1948; Sold for scrapping, 30 October 1964, withdrawn from fleet, 31 December 1964

General characteristics
- Class & type: Liberty ship; type EC2-S-C1, standard
- Tonnage: 10,865 LT DWT; 7,176 GRT
- Displacement: 3,380 long tons (3,434 t) (light); 14,245 long tons (14,474 t) (max)
- Length: 441 feet 6 inches (135 m) oa; 416 feet (127 m) pp; 427 feet (130 m) lwl
- Beam: 57 feet (17 m)
- Draft: 27 ft 9.25 in (8.4646 m)
- Installed power: 2 × Oil fired 450 °F (232 °C) boilers, operating at 220 psi (1,500 kPa); 2,500 hp (1,900 kW)
- Propulsion: 1 × triple-expansion steam engine, (manufactured by General Machinery Corp., Hamilton, Ohio); 1 × screw propeller
- Speed: 11.5 knots (21.3 km/h; 13.2 mph)
- Capacity: 562,608 cubic feet (15,931 m^{3}) (grain); 499,573 cubic feet (14,146 m^{3}) (bale)
- Complement: 38–62 USMM; 21–40 USNAG
- Armament: Varied by ship; Bow-mounted 3-inch (76 mm)/50-caliber gun; Stern-mounted 4-inch (102 mm)/50-caliber gun; 2–8 × single 20-millimeter (0.79 in) Oerlikon anti-aircraft (AA) cannons and/or, 2–8 × 37-millimeter (1.46 in) M1 AA guns

SS Harold A. Jordan was a Liberty ship built in the United States during World War II. She was named after Harold A. Jordan, a Merchant seaman killed on the cargo ship SS Millinocket, 17 June 1942, when she was struck and sunk by a torpedo from German submarine U-129.

== Construction ==
Harold A. Jordan was laid down on 30 November 1944, under a Maritime Commission (MARCOM) contract, MC hull 2514, by the St. Johns River Shipbuilding Company, Jacksonville, Florida; she was sponsored by Mrs. William H. Jordan, the mother of the namesake, and she was launched on 6 January 1945.

== History ==
She was allocated to the Parry Navigation Co., on 17 January 1945. On 26 September 1947, she was laid up in the National Defense Reserve Fleet, Wilmington, North Carolina. She was sold for scrapping, 30 October 1954, to Union Minerals & Alloys Corp., for $48,129.79. She was removed from the fleet, 31 December 1964.

== Bibliography ==
- "St. John's River Shipbuilding, Jacksonville FL". www.ShipbuildingHistory.com. 16 October 2010.
- Maritime Administration. "Harold A. Jordan". Ship History Database Vessel Status Card. U.S. Department of Transportation, Maritime Administration.
- Davies, James (May 2004). "Specifications (As-Built)" (PDF). p. 23.
- "SS Harold A. Jordan".
- "SS Millinocket". www.Uboat.net.
