= Francis L. Smith =

American politician

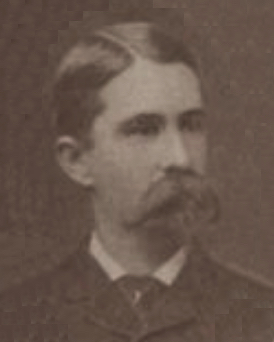

Member of the Virginia Senate from the 14th district
- In office December 3, 1879 – December 5, 1883
- Preceded by: William H. F. Lee
- Succeeded by: Elisha E. Meredith

Personal details
- Born: Francis Lee Smith Jr. October 6, 1845 Alexandria, Virginia, U.S.
- Died: August 25, 1916 (aged 70) Alexandria, Virginia, U.S.
- Party: Democratic
- Spouse: Jannie Sutherlin
- Education: Virginia Military Institute

Military service
- Allegiance: Confederate States
- Branch/service: Confederate States Army
- Battles/wars: American Civil War

Francis Lee Smith Jr. (October 6, 1845 – August 25, 1916) was an Confederate veteran, lawyer and politician who served in the Virginia Senate and as a delegate to the Virginia Constitutional Convention of 1902, representing his native Alexandria.

== Early and family life ==
Born in Alexandria in 1845, to the former Sarah Gosnell Vowell (an Alexandria native) and her lawyer husband, Francis Lee Smith Sr. His father had been born in Warrenton, Virginia in 1808 and would die in Alexandria in 1877. His middle name designates his membership through his grandfather in the Lee Family of Virginia, one of the First Families of Virginia, but other ancestors who emigrated in early colonial days included Major John Smith, Col. George Reade, Col. Miles Cary and Col. William Ball. and his mother in (nearer) Fairfax County, Virginia. His father was elected as Alexandria's representative to the Virginia House of Delegates in 1848 but only served a single term. He had an elder brother, Cliffie H. Smith, and younger brother, Courtland Smith, and sisters Margaret, Mary, Alice and Sarah, and the household also included a 45 year old white housekeeper, Nora Bell. In the 1850 federal census, the family owned four enslaved people, and a decade later Smith Sr. owned 13,000 in real estate and personal property including six enslaved people, of whom all but one were women.

Smith was educated in Alexandria preparatory schools (public schools not existing until after the Civil War), then sent to Lexington to complete his studies at the Virginia Military Institute during the American Civil War. He graduated in 1864. He then read law.

== Military service ==
Despite his youth and family's desire to educate him, Smith as a private in the Confederate Army as the VMI cadet corps fought at the Battle of New Market, during which he was wounded in the chin and shoulder. As an adult, he continued military service, serving as captain of the Alexandria Light Infantry in 1878. He rose to the rank of major of the Third Regiment of Virginia Volunteers in 1881, and the following year became the regiment's lieutenant colonel.

== Career ==
Admitted to the bar in Alexandria in 1867, Smith worked as the city's corporation attorney in 1870-1874, He also worked for the Richmond and Danville Railroad before moving back to Alexandria in 1876, where he had a private practice as the attorney for various corporations, including the Pennsylvania Railroad which operated in the city. At some time after Alexandria established (segregated) public schools in 1870, Smith served as president of the school board, and he also for a time served on the board of visitors for his alma mater. Adams also served as a member of the board of directors of the Citizen's National Bank of Alexandria.

In 1879, voters in Alexandria City and adjoining Arlington (then known as Alexandria County), Fairfax and Prince William Counties elected Smith to the Virginia Senate, the previously two-senator district that also had included Loudoun County having been split, so he effectively replaced Rooney Lee and veteran politician Charles E. Sinclair. He also served as an alderman for his home time from 1885-1887, and as a member of the Virginia Constitutional Convention of 1901 representing Alexandria City and Alexandria County.

== Personal life ==
Smith married Janie L. Sutherlin of Danville, Virginia on November 20, 1871, but she died in 1876, leaving this man to raise their daughter (also named Janie).

== Death and legacy ==
Smith is buried at Alexandria's Presbyterian Cemetery. He also survived his daughter, but before her death, she married Edward Ware Barrett of Athens, Georgia, and bore a daughter who reached adulthood.
