= Stephen R. Donohoe =

American politician (1851–1921)

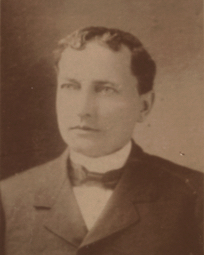

Virginia Auditor of Public Accounts
- In office December 24, 1910 – March 1, 1912
- Governor: William Hodges Mann
- Preceded by: Morton Marye
- Succeeded by: C. Lee Moore

Member of the Virginia Senate from the 14th district
- In office December 6, 1899 – January 13, 1904
- Preceded by: George A. Mushbach
- Succeeded by: Lewis H. Machen

Personal details
- Born: Stephen Roszel Donohoe; February 1, 1851 Loudoun, Virginia, U.S.
- Died: January 3, 1921 (aged 69) Richmond, Virginia, U.S.
- Party: Democratic
- Spouses: Heloise Eubank; Susan Moore

Military service
- Branch/service: United States Army
- Rank: Captain
- Battles/wars: Spanish–American War

Stephen Roszel Donohoe (February 1, 1851 – January 3, 1921) was an American politician who served in the Virginia Senate. In 1910, he was appointed by Governor William Hodges Mann as the state's Auditor of Public Accounts.
