= SS William P. Duval =

World War II Liberty ship of the United States

History

United States
- Name: William P. Duval
- Namesake: William P. Duval
- Owner: War Shipping Administration (WSA)
- Operator: Blidberg & Rothchild Co.Inc.
- Ordered: as type (EC2-S-C1) hull, MC hull 2319
- Builder: J.A. Jones Construction, Panama City, Florida
- Cost: $1,043,714
- Yard number: 60
- Way number: 4
- Laid down: 10 August 1944
- Launched: 15 September 1944
- Sponsored by: Mary Caldwell
- Completed: 29 September 1944
- Identification: Call sign: KSSQ
- Fate: Sold for commercial use, 10 January 1947, withdrawn from fleet, 13 January 1947

Italy
- Name: Vesuvio
- Namesake: Mount Vesuvius
- Owner: Società di navigazione Italia
- Fate: Scrapped, 1973

General characteristics
- Class & type: Liberty ship; type EC2-S-C1, standard
- Tonnage: 10,865 LT DWT; 7,176 GRT
- Displacement: 3,380 long tons (3,434 t) (light); 14,245 long tons (14,474 t) (max)
- Length: 441 feet 6 inches (135 m) oa; 416 feet (127 m) pp; 427 feet (130 m) lwl
- Beam: 57 feet (17 m)
- Draft: 27 ft 9.25 in (8.4646 m)
- Installed power: 2 × Oil fired 450 °F (232 °C) boilers, operating at 220 psi (1,500 kPa); 2,500 hp (1,900 kW)
- Propulsion: 1 × triple-expansion steam engine, (manufactured by General Machinery Corp., Hamilton, Ohio); 1 × screw propeller
- Speed: 11.5 knots (21.3 km/h; 13.2 mph)
- Capacity: 562,608 cubic feet (15,931 m^{3}) (grain); 499,573 cubic feet (14,146 m^{3}) (bale)
- Complement: 38–62 USMM; 21–40 USNAG
- Armament: Varied by ship; Bow-mounted 3-inch (76 mm)/50-caliber gun; Stern-mounted 4-inch (102 mm)/50-caliber gun; 2–8 × single 20-millimeter (0.79 in) Oerlikon anti-aircraft (AA) cannons and/or, 2–8 × 37-millimeter (1.46 in) M1 AA guns

SS William P. Duval was a Liberty ship built in the United States during World War II. She was named after William P. Duval, the first civilian governor of the Florida Territory.

== Construction ==
William P. Duval was laid down on 10 August 1944, under a Maritime Commission (MARCOM) contract, MC hull 2319, by J.A. Jones Construction, Panama City, Florida; sponsored by Mary Caldwell, wife of then Florida Governor-elect, Millard Caldwell, and launched on 15 September 1944.

== History ==
She was allocated to Blidberg & Rothchild Co. Inc., 29 September 1944. On 17 May 1946, she was laid up in the National Defense Reserve Fleet, Hudson River Reserve Fleet, Jones Point, New York.

She was allocated to the Parry Navigation Co., 15 November 1946.

She was sold, on 10 January 1947, to Società di navigazione Italia, for $563,117.54 and commercial use. She was flagged in Italy and renamed Vesuvio. She was withdrawn from the fleet on 13 January 1947. She was laid up in 1972 and scrapped in 1973.

== Bibliography ==
- "Jones Construction, Panama City FL". www.ShipbuildingHistory.com. 13 October 2010.
- Maritime Administration. "William P. Duval". Ship History Database Vessel Status Card. U.S. Department of Transportation, Maritime Administration. This article incorporates text from this source, which is in the public domain.
- Davies, James (May 2004). "Specifications (As-Built)" (PDF). p. 23.
- "SS William P. Duval".
