= Israel C. O'Neal =

American politician (1818-1899)

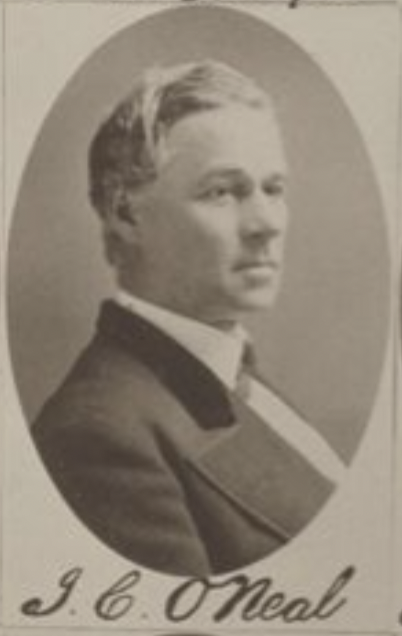

Member of the Virginia House of Delegates for Alexandria City and Alexandria
- In office January 1, 1874 – March 31, 1875

Personal details
- Born: Israel Christopher O'Neal; March 6, 1818 Frederick, Maryland, U.S.
- Died: March 2, 1899 (aged 80) Alexandria, Virginia, U.S.
- Resting place: St. Paul's Cemetery; Alexandria, Virginia, U.S.
- Party: Republican
- Spouse(s): Maria Catharine Doll (m. 1838; div. 1859) Annie Elizabeth Chandler (m. 1860; died 1862) Amanda Entwistle (m. 1863)
- Children: 9
- Occupation: Politician; sheriff; marshal

Israel Christopher O'Neal (1818 – March 2, 1899) was an American politician and law enforcement official. He was a member of the Virginia House of Delegates from 1874 to 1875. He rarely used the name Israel, instead identifying himself as "I.C." (which has often been misinterpreted in handwritten records as "J.C.").

== Early life ==
O'Neal was born in Frederick, Maryland, to John and Rebecca O'Neal. He was christened at Evangelical Lutheran Church.

== Law enforcement and other government service ==
In 1853, O'Neal was elected sheriff of Frederick County, having run as a member of the Whig Party. He served in that office until 1855.

During the Civil War, he was a sutler to a regiment of the Union Army.

In October 1867, he was appointed Assistant Superintendent of Freedman's Village, a position he held until February 1868. He served as the Collector of Taxes for the Northern District of Alexandria in 1868.

He was appointed sheriff of Arlington County, Virginia in April 1869. After a change in law required the sheriff of Arlington County to be elected instead of appointed, he was elected to that office in November 1870 and served for three years, until December 31, 1873. On August 15, 1873, he conducted the execution of William Jackson, who had been convicted of killing his wife Mary Fletcher.

In April 1874 he was appointed by C. P. Ramsdell to be a Deputy United States Marshal for the Eastern District of Virginia. He held that position into the 1880s.

== Politics ==
After the decline of the Whig Party in the late 1850s, O'Neal became involved in Radical Republican politics. He participated in Radical Republican meetings throughout the 1860s and 1870s.

In 1874 O'Neal was elected to the Virginia House of Delegates as a Republican, representing Alexandria County along with Delegate John B. Syphax. He was assigned to the Committee on Banks, Currency and Commerce and the Committee on Counties, Cities and Towns. One newspaper described him as "a sturdy Republican and a good man," and said "[h]is modest good sense and gentlemanly bearing have won him the respect of all the members of the House."

While in the House of Delegates, he introduced bills to:

- prohibit unlawful hunting, fishing, and ranging in Alexandria County;
- extend the corporate powers of the German Banking Company of Alexandria;
- incorporate the Virginia Turnpike Company;
- authorize the Hebrew Congregation of Alexandria to borrow money; and
- amend the law regarding printing records of the Court of Appeals.

He also:

- advocated against the sale of liquor on Sunday;
- voted against a resolution protesting the seizure of the Louisiana statehouse by federal officials;
- was assigned to a special committee to investigate "the whereabouts of certain bonds which should be in the State Treasurer's office but are not"; and
- presented petitions on behalf of the citizens of Alexandria seeking:
  - an investigation into the alleged monopoly of the steamer Arrow in landing passengers at Mount Vernon; and
  - discretionary powers for the School Board of Alexandria to admit children age seven and under to public schools.

In 1875 he was nominated by the Radical Republicans to be a candidate for the Virginia Senate, but he declined the nomination.

O'Neal was nominated by Alexandria's conservative Republicans to be a candidate for Congress in 1876. He lost the election to Eppa Hunton, a Democrat and former Confederate general.

In 1883 the Republicans of Alexandria again nominated him as a candidate for the Virginia legislature.

== Business interests ==
Throughout his life, O'Neal was involved in numerous businesses. The 1850 United States Census listed him in Frederick with the occupation of shoemaker.

O'Neal formed a partnership with Frank E. Corbett in 1874. They purchased a brickworks from John Tucker and Robert Lucas for $7,700 in 1875. The business, known as O'Neal & Corbett, operated where the Gunston Hall Apartments are currently located in Alexandria. As of 1883, the business was described as "making about 1,500,000 bricks per annum and employing 35 men and boys." O'Neal exited the partnership in 1889, selling his share to Charles Yohe, at which point the business was renamed Corbett & Yohe.

O'Neal also had a real estate business with Samuel H. Lunt, and he owned a steamer, the Harry Loder, which ran between Alexandria and Piscataway Creek in Maryland.

== Personal life ==
O'Neal married his first wife, Maria Catharine Doll, on March 29, 1838, at Evangelical Lutheran Church in Frederick. They had nine children, including Lewis I. They divorced in 1859 shortly after the birth of their ninth child.

O'Neal married his second wife, Annie Elizabeth Chandler, on February 18, 1860, in Baltimore. She died two years later, on July 14, 1862, of unknown causes. He married his third wife, Amanda Entwistle, on September 3, 1863, in Washington, D.C.

He died on March 2, 1899, at his home at 911 Prince Street in Alexandria. His obituary stated his cause of death as apoplexy. He is interred in the O'Neal/McBurney lot at St. Paul's Cemetery in Alexandria, Virginia. His will was admitted to probate in the Corporation Court of Alexandria, Virginia on March 9, 1899. The administration of his estate took more than 10 years, after it was determined that he was insolvent at the time of his death.

He was a member of the Sons of Temperance and a noted orator on the subject of temperance. His involvement with the Sons of Temperance dates to at least 1845, when he was named as one of the incorporators in the legislative charter for the Frederick Division No. 15 of the Sons of Temperance.
