= C. P. Ramsdell =

C. P. Ramsdell (c. 1825 to September 16, 1882) was a newspaper founder, United States Marshal, and state legislator in Pennsylvania and Virginia. A Republican, he served in the Virginia House of Delegates from 1871 to 1873. He lived in Surry County, Virginia.

He was born in Otsego County, New York.

He wrote to President Abraham Lincoln in 1861 in support of an appointment for Lloyd Jones Esq. He published and edited the Venango Citizen and served in the Pennsylvania Legislature. He was elected Assistant Clerk of the Pennsylvania Senate.

He served as United States Marshal for the eastern district of Virginia. He was a candidate for Lieutenant Governor of Virginia but lost to Robert E. Withers. He advocated for immigration to Virginia.
