= John Franklin Rixey =

American politician

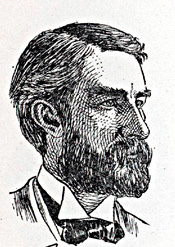

Member of the U.S. House of Representatives from Virginia's 8th district
- In office March 4, 1897 – February 8, 1907
- Preceded by: Elisha E. Meredith
- Succeeded by: Charles C. Carlin

Personal details
- Born: August 1, 1854 Culpeper County, Virginia, U.S.
- Died: February 8, 1907 (aged 52) Washington, D.C., U.S.
- Party: Democratic
- Spouse: Ella B. Barbour
- Children: 4
- Education: University of Virginia
- Occupation: Lawyer

John Franklin Rixey (August 1, 1854 – February 8, 1907) was a Democratic U.S. congressman from Virginia's 8th congressional district from 1897 to 1907.

== Early and family life ==
John Franklin Rixey was born on August 1, 1854, in the Catalpa district of Culpeper County, Virginia, to farmer Presley Morehead Rixey and his wife the former Mary Frances Jones. His older brothers included Charles J. Rixey (1849–) and Presley Marion Rixey. The son of his younger brother, the banker Eppa Rixey (1857–1917) would become a major league baseball player, Eppa Rixey Jr. This John Rixey attended local schools and Bethel Academy, then studied law at the University of Virginia.

Rixey married Ella B. Barbour (1859–1946), daughter of James Barbour and his wife Fanny Thomas Beckham and granddaughter of John S. Barbour, who had likewise been a member of the U.S. House of Representatives from Virginia's 15th congressional district. Their children included Mary Barbour Compton (b. 1884), John Strode Rixey (b. 1891), James B. Rixey (b. 1895) and Edith Presley Rixey Moore (b. 1897).

== Career ==
After admission to the Virginia bar in 1875, Rixey had a private legal practice in Culpeper, Virginia. He was elected the county's Commonwealth Attorney (prosecutor) in 1879 and served in that position until 1891.

In 1896, Democratic Congressman Elisha E. Meredith retired to his legal practice, and voters in Virginia's 8th congressional district elected Rixey to the 55th Congress. Re-elected five times, Rixey served from March 4, 1897, until his death in Washington, D.C., on February 8, 1907 (before the close of the 59th Congress). Although he had been re-elected to the 60th Congress, he died before beginning that term.

Beginning in his third Congressional term, Rixey proposed to place all Civil War veterans in the same class with respect to federal and state soldiers' homes. He also hosted President Theodore Roosevelt at Beauregard during his visit to Culpeper county and Cedar Run battlefield in 1902. Furthermore, a troop of Culpeper County veterans from the Spanish–American War marched at Roosevelt's inauguration. Rixey also introduced bills to create Manassas Battlefield Park, as advocated by constituents Edmund Berkeley and George Carr Round, although none passed until decades after his unexpectedly early death.

== Death and legacy ==
Rixey died in Washington, D.C., on February 8, 1907. His portrait was placed at the courthouse in 1917.

After a contested Democratic primary, Charles Creighton Carlin of Alexandria, Virginia, succeeded him in the U.S. House.

== See also ==
- List of members of the United States Congress who died in office (1900–1949)

U.S. House of Representatives
Preceded by Elisha E. Meredith	Member of the U.S. House of Representatives from Virginia's 8th congressional district 1897–1907	Succeeded by Charles C. Carlin
