= Preston W. Campbell =

American judge (1874–1954)

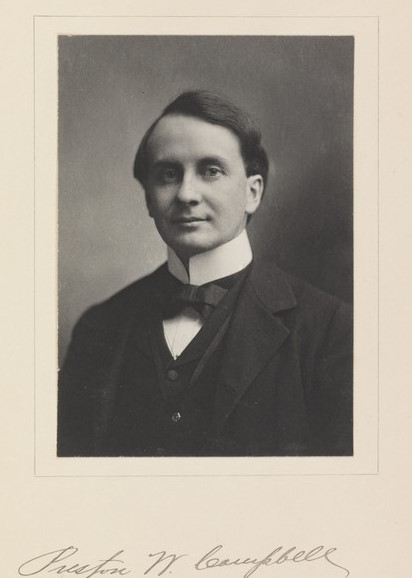
- Preston Campbell attending the Virginia Constitutional Convention of 1901-02

17th Chief Justice of Virginia
- In office November 26, 1931 – October 1, 1946
- Preceded by: Robert R. Prentis
- Succeeded by: Henry W. Holt

Justice of the Supreme Court of Virginia
- In office February 1, 1924 – October 1, 1946
- Preceded by: Joseph L. Kelly
- Succeeded by: Archibald C. Buchanan

Personal details
- Born: Preston White Campbell; January 24, 1874 Abingdon, Virginia, U.S.
- Died: July 2, 1954 (aged 80) Johnson City, Tennessee, U.S.
- Spouse: Louise Elwood Howard
- Education: University of Virginia

Preston White Campbell (January 24, 1874 – July 2, 1954) was a Virginia lawyer who served as the chief justice of the Supreme Court of Virginia. Born in Abingdon, Virginia, he was educated by tutors and at the Abingdon Male Academy. He read law in the office of Francis B. Hutton, later a circuit judge, and after being admitted to the bar, attended the University of Virginia for further study under Professor John B. Minor. He began practice in Abingdon and was the youngest member of the Constitutional Convention of 1901-02. In 1911, he became Commonwealth's Attorney of Washington County, Virginia and served until 1914 when he became judge of the Twenty-Third Circuit Court. When Judge Joseph L. Kelly retired in 1924, Judge Campbell was elected to the Supreme Court of Appeals and, in 1931, became chief justice. He retired from the court in 1946.
